= Gucui Road station =

Metro station in China

Gucui Road 古翠路
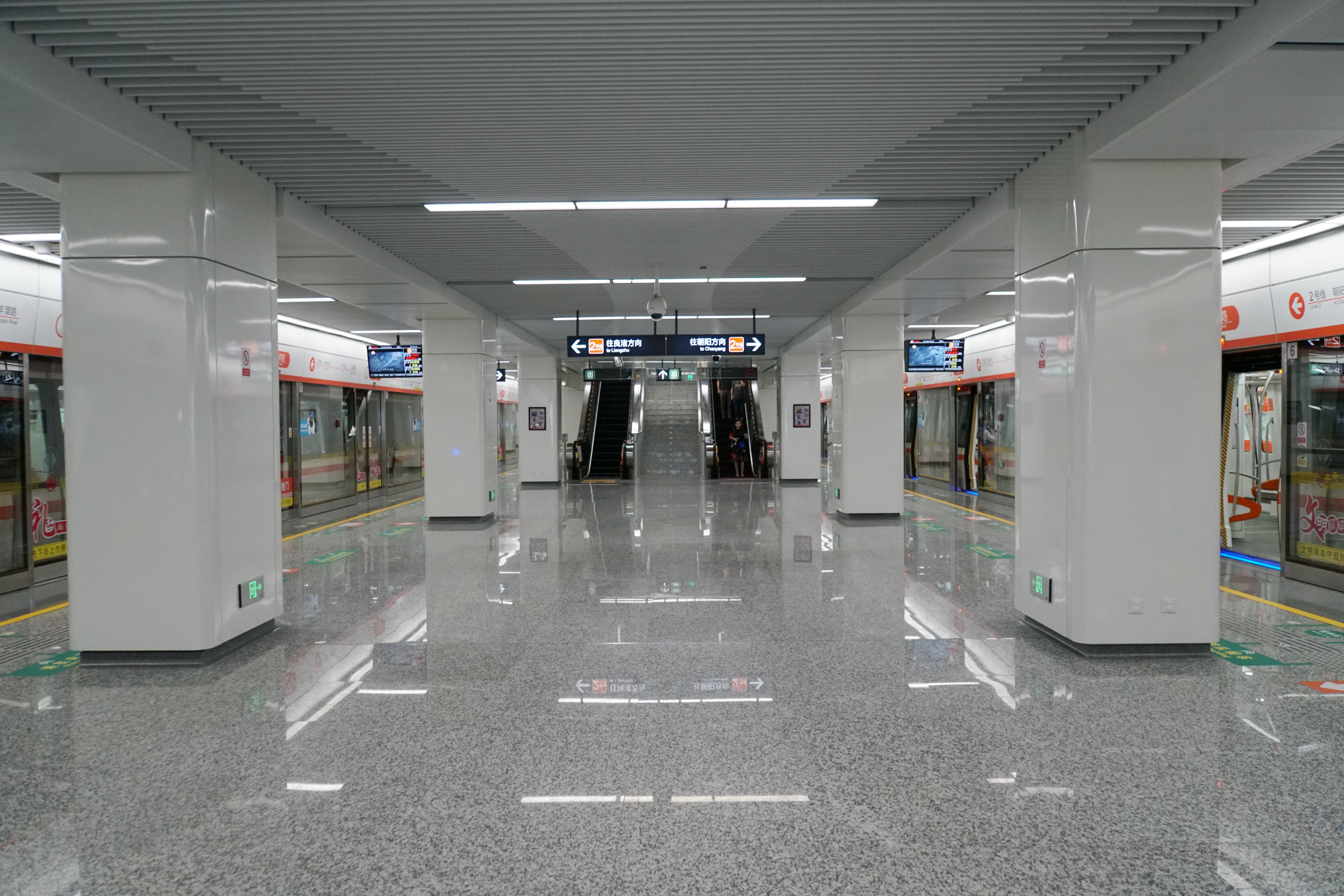

General information
- Location: Xihu District, Hangzhou, Zhejiang; China
- Coordinates: 30.2845°N 120.1129°E
- Operated by: Hangzhou Metro Corporation
- Line: Line 2
- Platforms: 2 (1 island platform)

History
- Opened: July 3, 2017

Services
Preceding station	Hangzhou Metro	Following station
Xueyuan Road towards Chaoyang	Line 2	Fengtan Road towards Liangzhu
Location

Gucui Road (Chinese: 古翠路) is a metro station on Line 2 of the Hangzhou Metro in China. It is located in the Xihu District of Hangzhou.
