= Wenxin station =

Metro station in China

Wenxin 文新
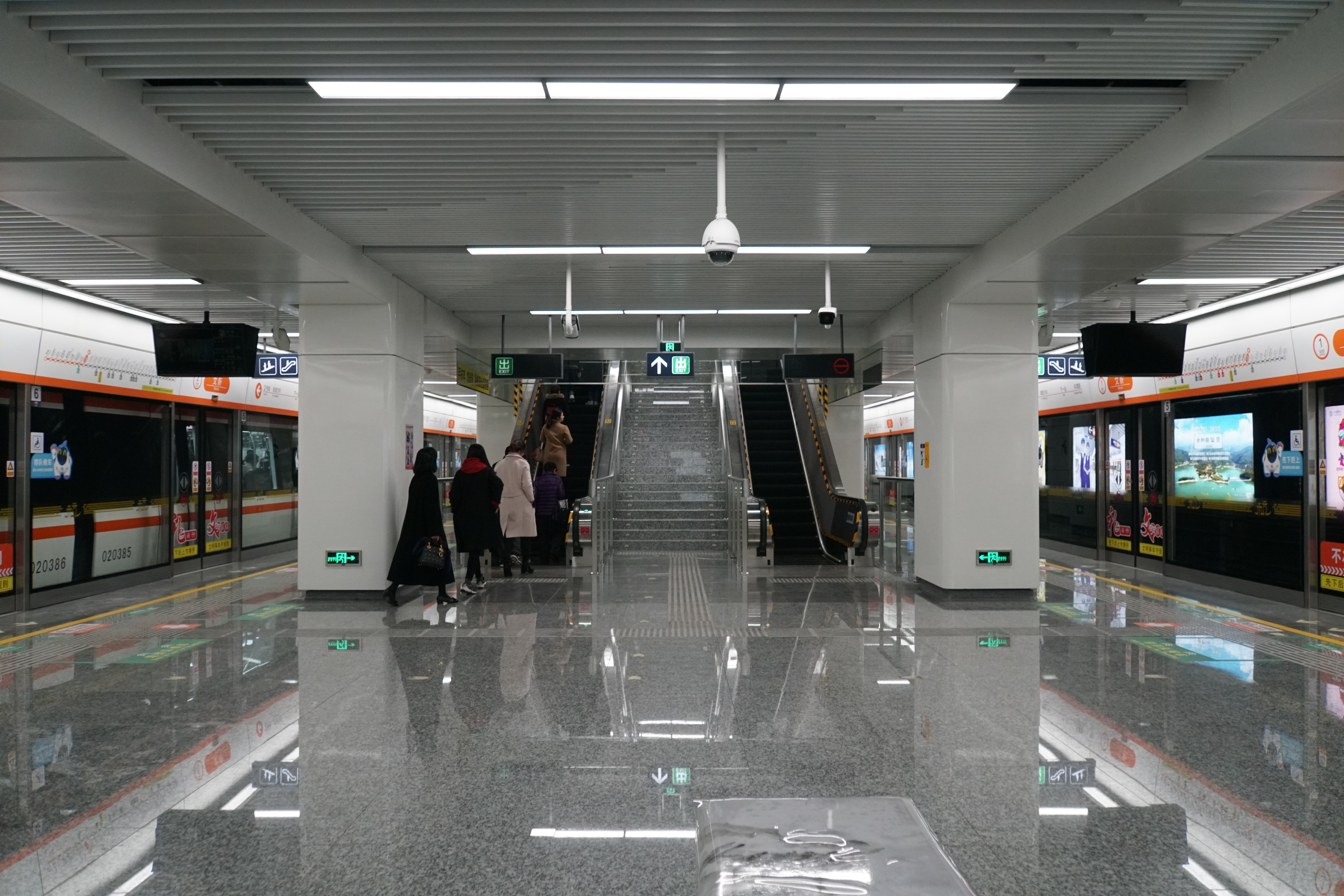

General information
- Location: Xihu District, Hangzhou, Zhejiang; China
- Operated by: Hangzhou Metro Corporation
- Line: Line 2
- Platforms: 2 (1 island platform)

History
- Opened: December 27, 2017

Services
Preceding station	Hangzhou Metro	Following station
Fengtan Road towards Chaoyang	Line 2	Sanba towards Liangzhu
Location

Wenxin (Chinese: 文新) is a metro station on Line 2 of the Hangzhou Metro in China. It is located in the Xihu District of Hangzhou.
