= Qingling Road station =

Metro station in Hangzhou, China

Qingling Road 庆菱路
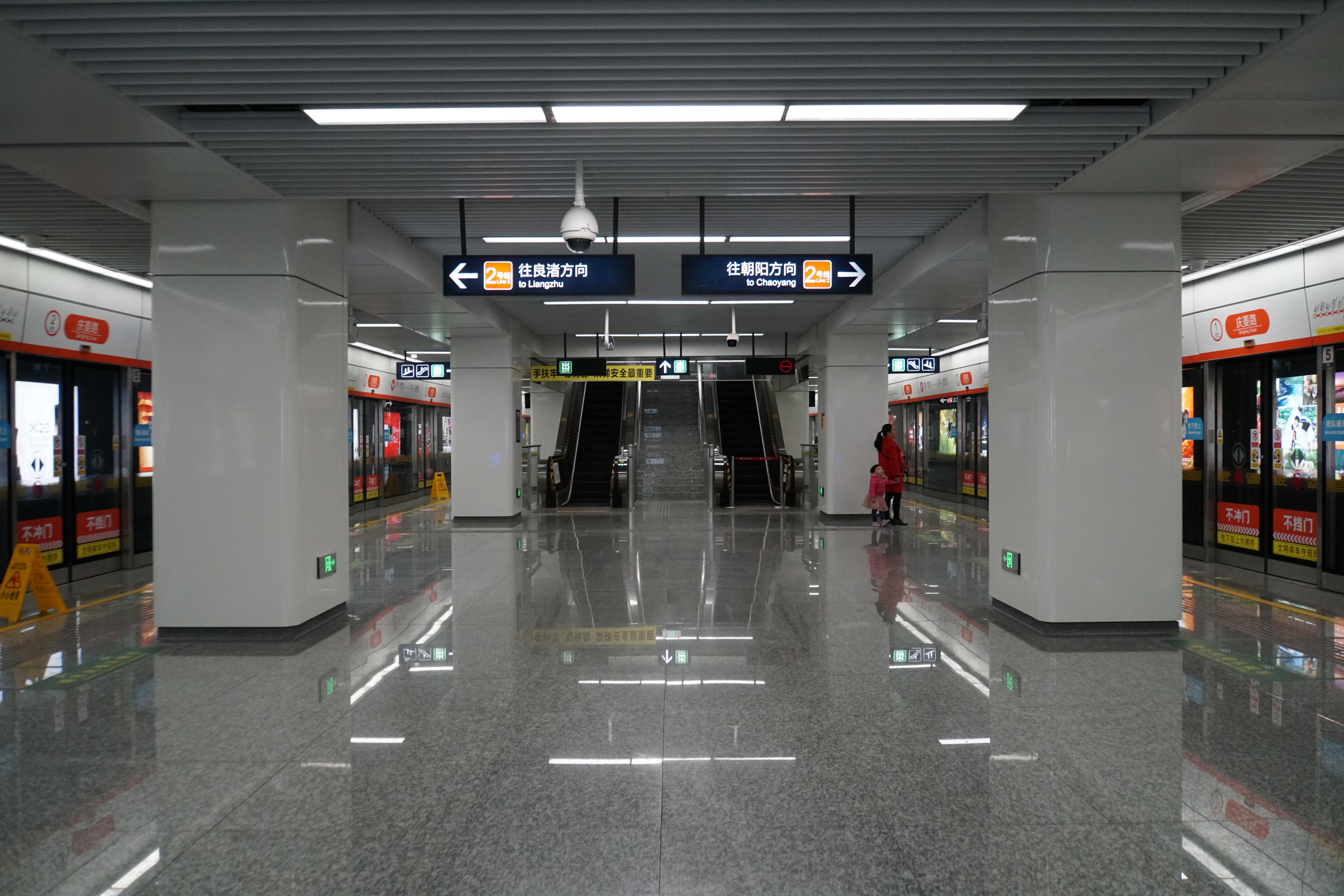
- Platforms

General information
- Location: Qingchun Rd.(E) × Qingling Rd. Shangcheng District, Hangzhou, Zhejiang; China
- Coordinates: 30.26008°N 120.18867°E
- System: Hangzhou metro station
- Operator: Hangzhou Metro Corporation
- Line: Line 2
- Platforms: 2 (1 island platform)

Construction
- Structure type: Underground
- Accessible: Yes

History
- Opened: July 3, 2017

Services
Preceding station	Hangzhou Metro	Following station
Qingchun Square towards Chaoyang	Line 2	North Jianguo Road towards Liangzhu
Location

Qingling Road (simplified Chinese: 庆菱路; traditional Chinese: 慶菱路) is a metro station on Line 2 of the Hangzhou Metro in China. It is located in the Shangcheng District of Hangzhou.

== Station layout ==
Qingling Road has two levels: a concourse, and an island platform with two tracks for line 2.

== Entrances/exits ==
- A1 & A2: north side of Qingchun Rd. (E)
- B: north side of Qingchun Rd. (E)
- C: Qingchun Yufu Community
