= Jinjiadu station =

Metro station in Hangzhou, China

Jinjiadu 金家渡
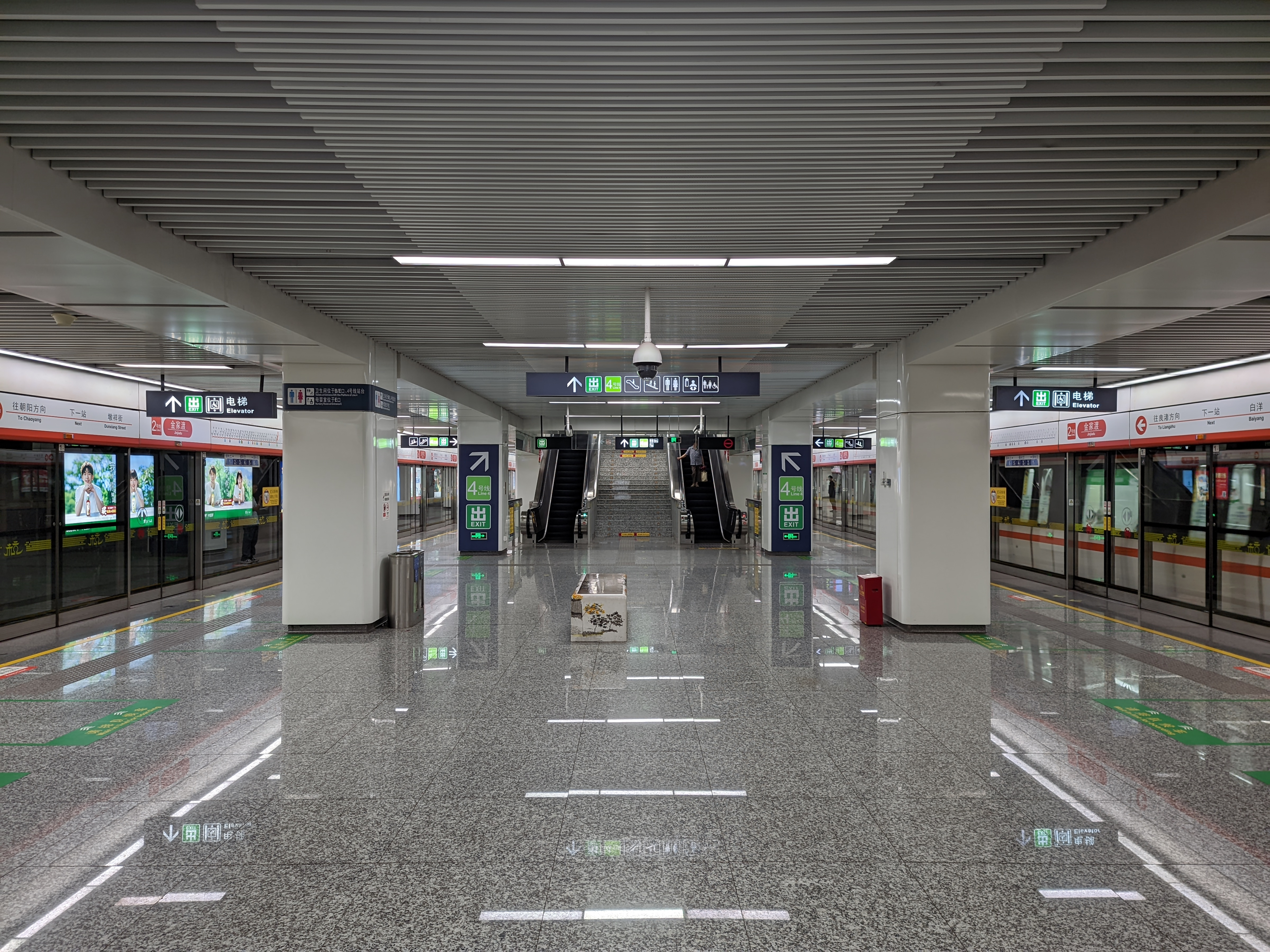
- Platforms of Line 2

General information
- Location: Gudun Road × Chihua Street & Jinchang Road; Yuhang District, Hangzhou, Zhejiang; China
- Coordinates: 30°20′29″N 120°04′45″E
- System: Hangzhou metro station
- Operator: Hangzhou Metro Corporation
- Lines: Line 2; Line 4
- Platforms: 4 (2 island platforms)

Construction
- Structure type: Underground
- Accessible: Yes

History
- Opened: 27 December 2017 (Line 2); 21 February 2022 (Line 4)

Services
Preceding station	Hangzhou Metro	Following station
Dunxiang Street towards Chaoyang	Line 2	Baiyang towards Liangzhu
Haoyun Street towards Puyan	Line 4	Chihua Street Terminus
Location

Jinjiadu (Chinese: 金家渡) is a metro station on Line 2 and Line 4 of the Hangzhou Metro in China. It is located in the Yuhang District of Hangzhou. Line 2 began its service on 27 December 2017, and Line 4 began on 21 February 2022.

== Station layout ==
Jinjiadu has three levels: a concourse, and separate levels for lines 2 and 4. Each of these consists of an island platform with two tracks.

== Entrances/exits ==
- A: Xie'an Lanjun community
- B: Gemdale Plaza
- C: Mingyayuan community (west zone)
- D: Mingyayuan community (east zone)
- E: Gemdale Plaza
- F: Zhonghai Jinxiyuan community
