= People's Square station (Hangzhou Metro) =

Metro station in Hangzhou, China

People's Square 人民广场
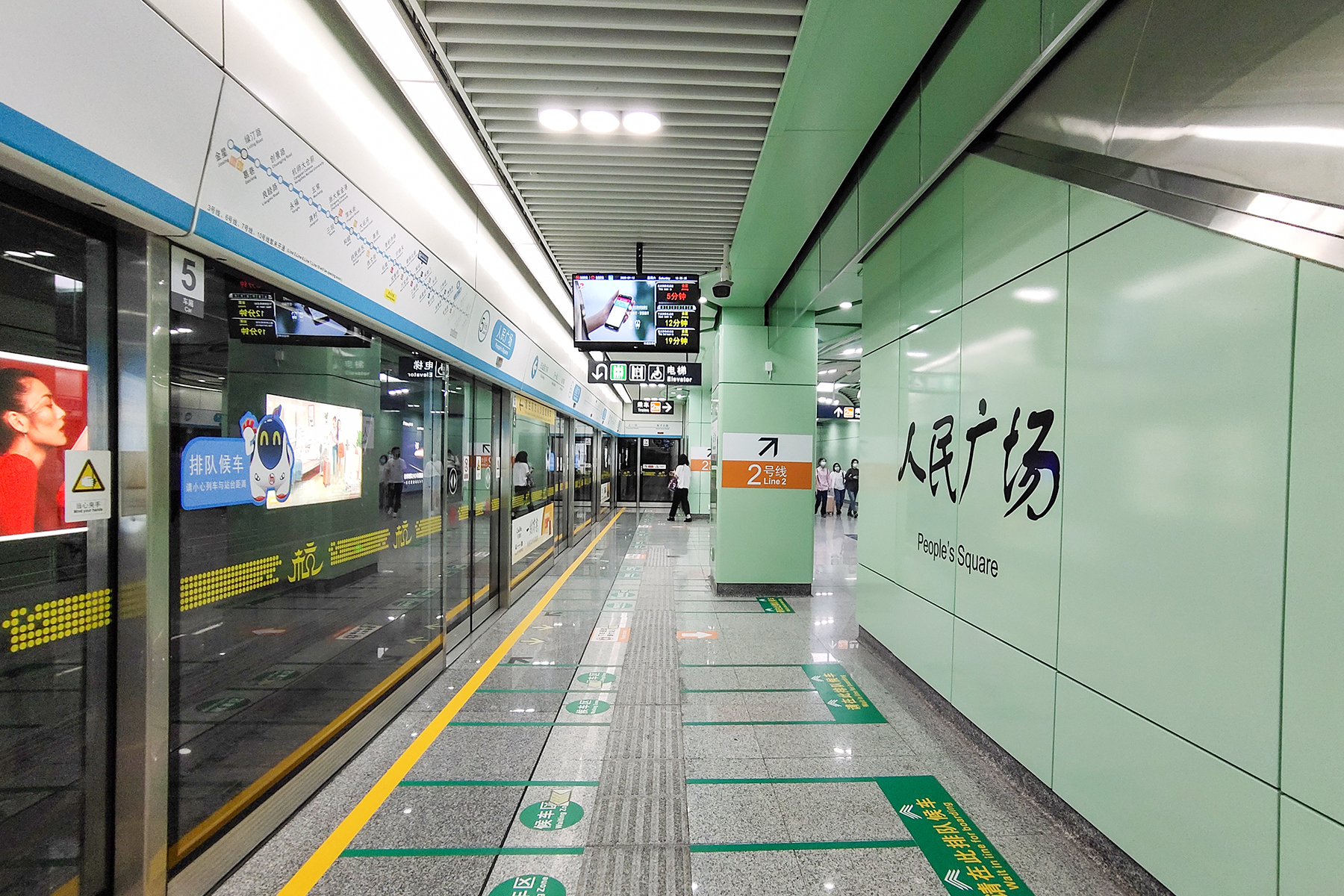
- Platforms of Line 5

General information
- Location: Shixin Road (M) × Jincheng Road; Xiaoshan District, Hangzhou, Zhejiang; China
- Coordinates: 30°11′01″N 120°15′45″E
- System: Hangzhou metro station
- Operator: Hangzhou Metro Corporation; Hangzhou MTR Line 5 Corporation
- Lines: Line 2 Line 5
- Platforms: 4 (2 island platforms)

Construction
- Structure type: Underground
- Accessible: Yes

History
- Opened: November 24, 2014 (Line 2); April 23, 2020 (Line 5)

Services
Preceding station	Hangzhou Metro	Following station
Hangfachang towards Chaoyang	Line 2	Jiansheyi Road towards Liangzhu
Jinji Road towards East Nanhu	Line 5	North Yucai Road towards Guniangqiao
Location

People's Square (Chinese: 人民广场) is a metro station on Line 2 and Line 5 in China. It is located in the Xiaoshan District of Hangzhou. The initial name of the station was People Square and it was changed to People's Square in 2015. The station of Line 2 was opened on 24 November 2014, and become a transfer station since the opening of Line 5 on 23 April 2020.

== Station layout ==
People's Square has three levels: a concourse, and separate levels for lines 2 and 5. Each of these consists of an island platform with two tracks.

== Entrances/exits ==
- A1: Mixc One Hangzhou
- A2: east side of Shixin Rd.(N)
- B: People's Square
- C2: New Century Grand Hotel Hangzhou
- C3: Shidai Guangchang Community
- C4: Jindi Hi-tech Plaza
- C5: Jindi Hi-tech Plaza
- C6: Shidai Guangchang Community
- D: New Century Grand Hotel Hangzhou
- E: Lvdu Shimao Plaza
