= Shentangqiao station =

Metro station in China

Coordinates: 30°16′55.09″N 120°8′44.34″E

Shentangqiao 沈塘桥
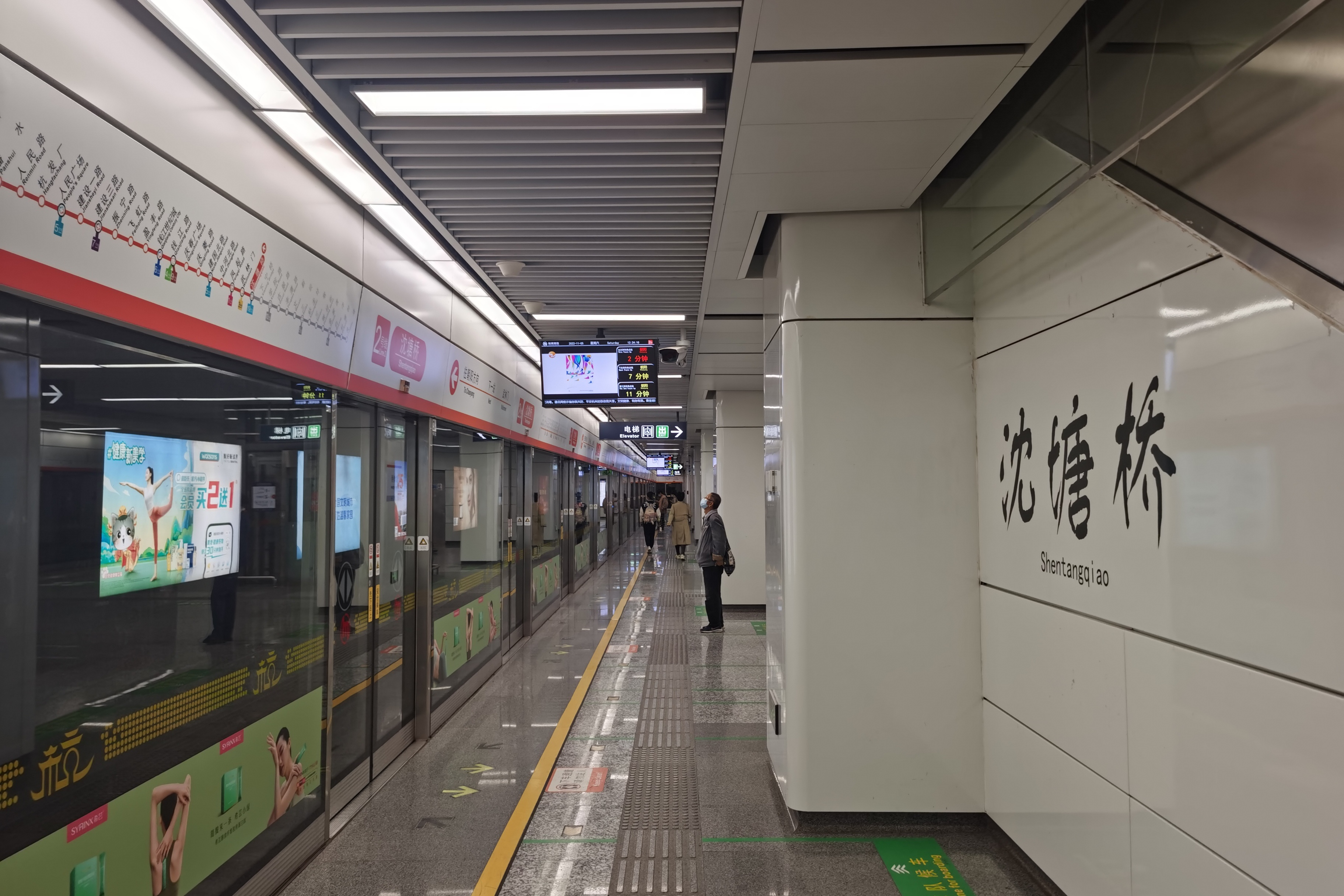
- Platforms of Line 2

General information
- Location: Gongshu District, Hangzhou, Zhejiang; China
- Operated by: Hangzhou Metro Corporation
- Lines: Line 2 Line 19
- Platforms: 4 (2 island platforms)

History
- Opened: July 3, 2017 (Line 2); September 22, 2022 (Line 19)

Services
| Preceding station | Hangzhou Metro | Following station |
|---|---|---|
| Wulinmen towards Chaoyang | Line 2 | Xianing Bridge towards Liangzhu |
| Wensan Road towards Tiaoxi | Line 19 | West Lake Cultural Square towards Yongsheng Road |
Location

Shentangqiao (Chinese: 沈塘桥) is a metro station on Line 2 and Line 19 of the Hangzhou Metro in China. It is located in the Gongshu District of Hangzhou. The transfer corridor between Line 2 and Line 19 was opened on November 1, 2022.

== Gallery ==
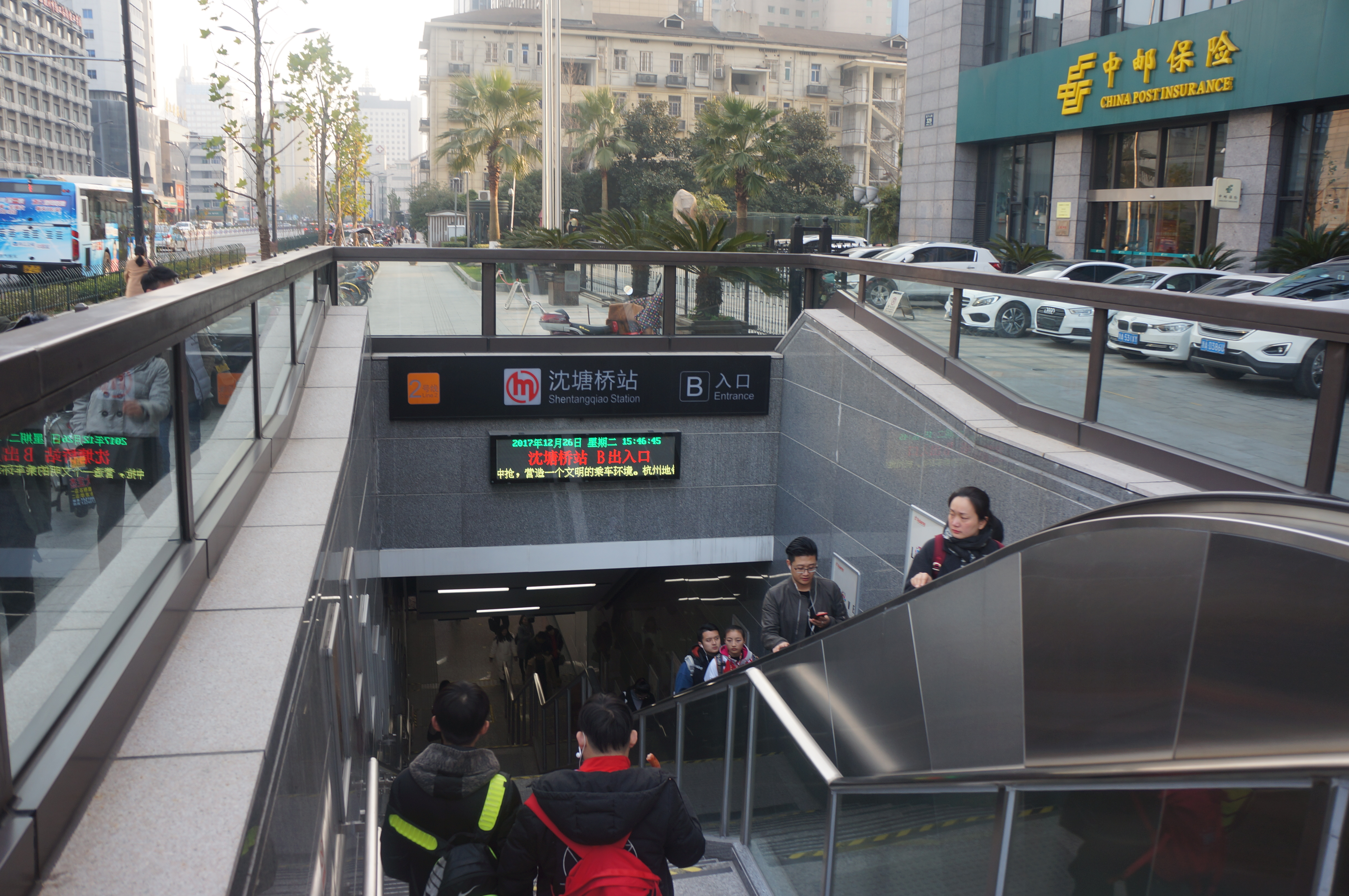
Entrance B

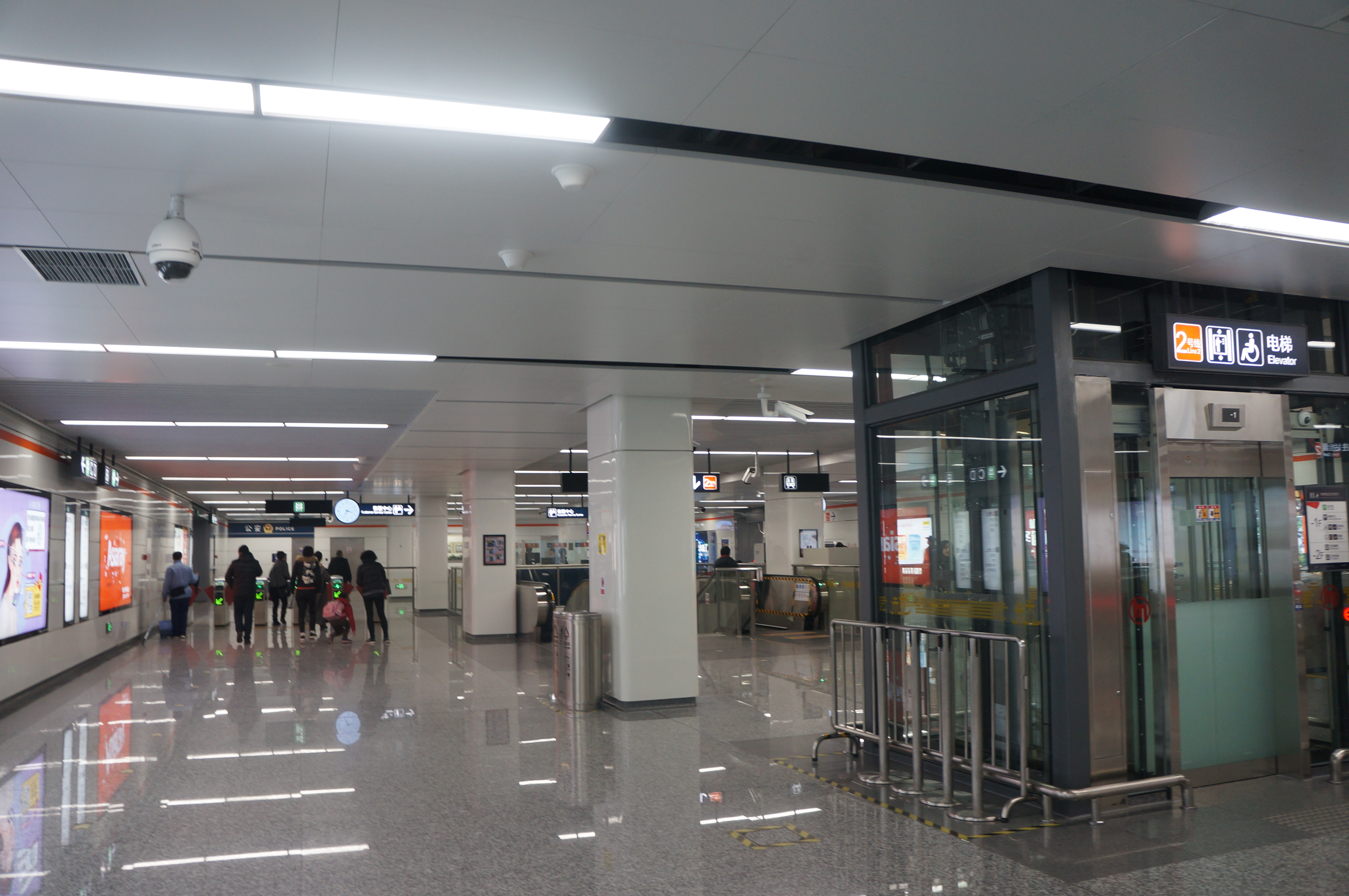
Concourse of Line 2

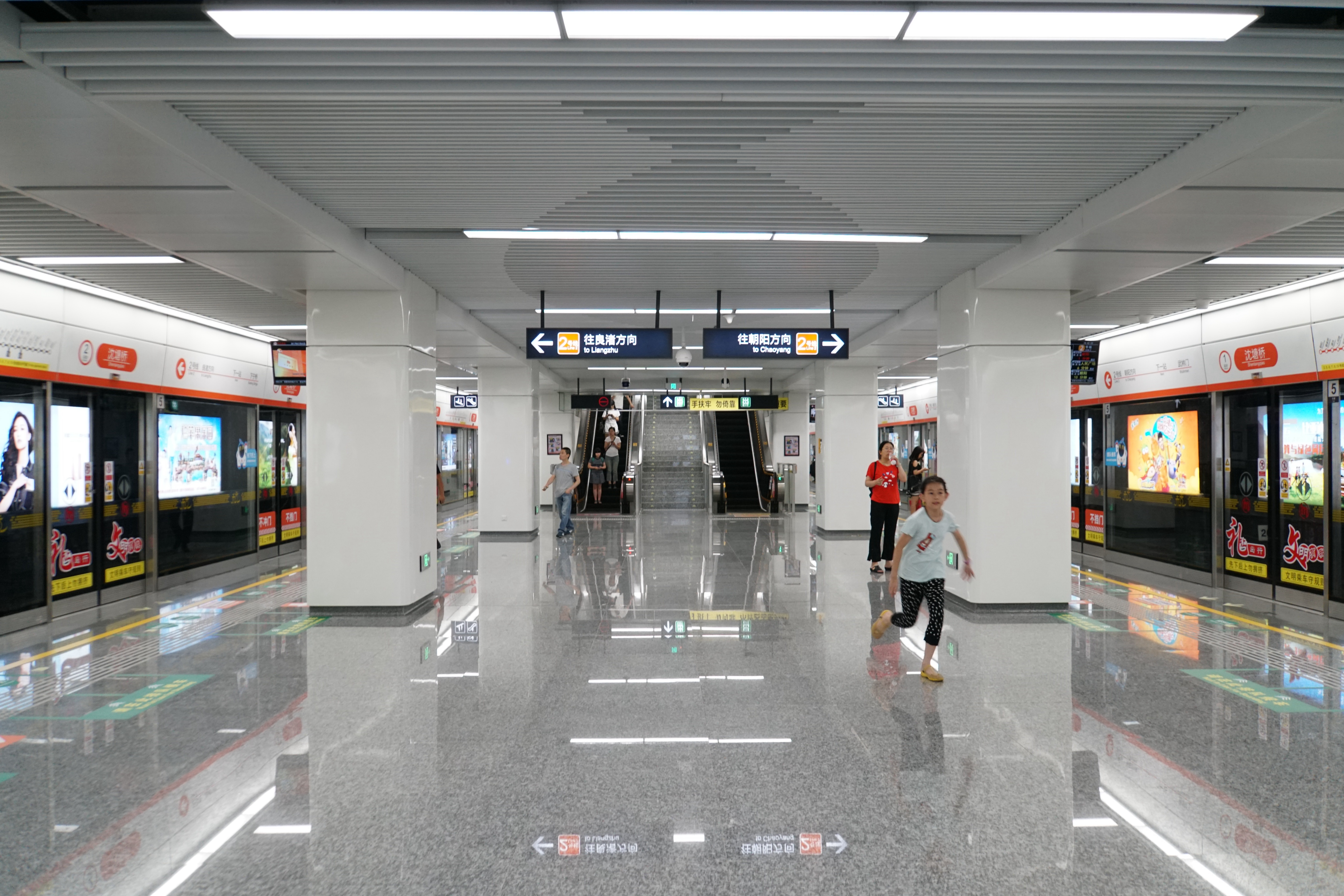
Platforms of Line 2
