= Jiansheyi Road station =

Hangzhou Metro station

Coordinates: 30°11′47″N 120°15′43″E

Jiansheyi Road 建设一路
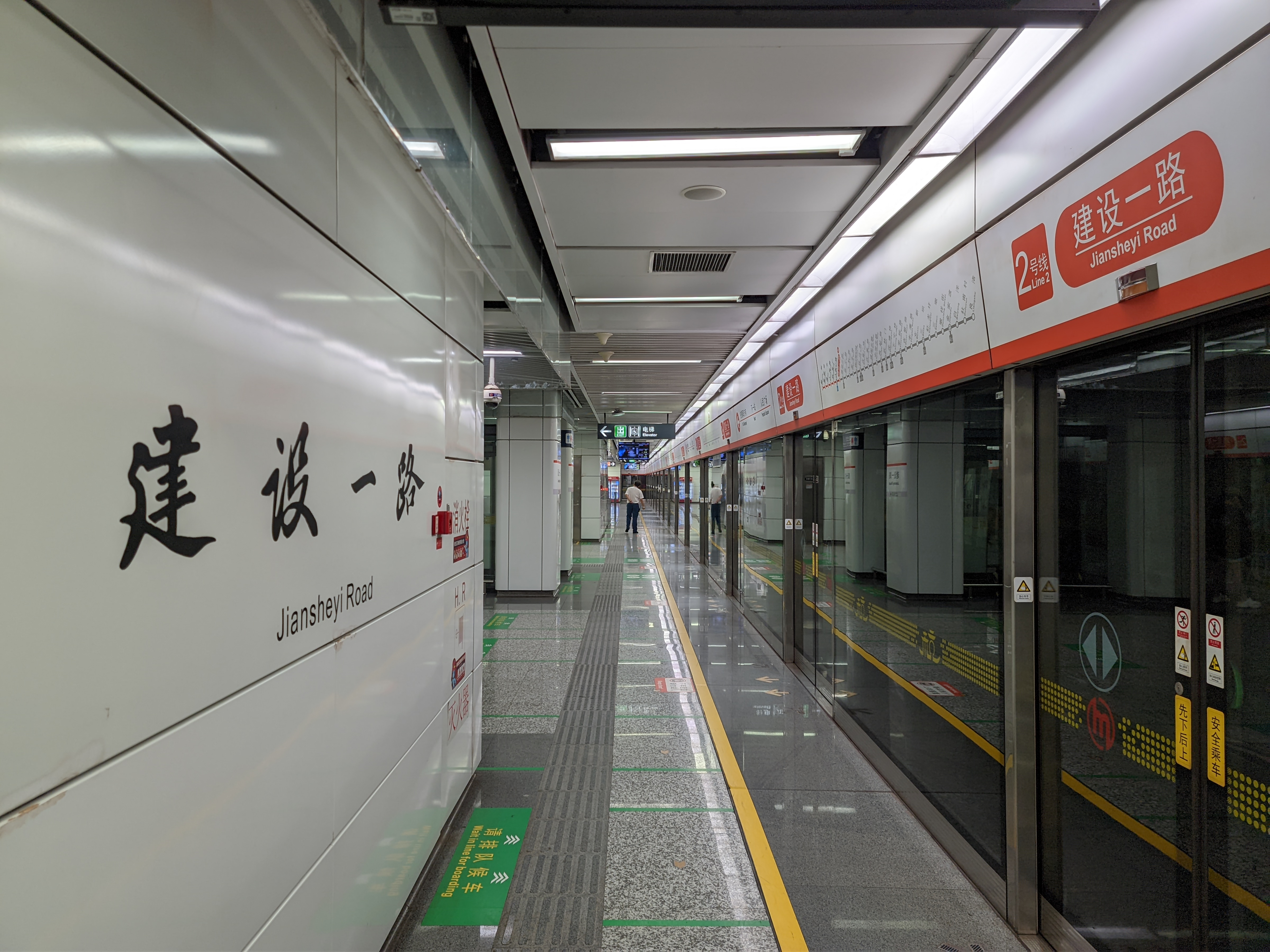
- Platform

General information
- Location: Xiaoshan District, Hangzhou, Zhejiang; China
- Operated by: Hangzhou Metro Corporation
- Line: Line 2
- Platforms: 2 (1 island platforms)

History
- Opened: November 24, 2014

Services
Preceding station	Hangzhou Metro	Following station
People's Square towards Chaoyang	Line 2	Jianshesan Road towards Liangzhu
Location

Jiansheyi Road (Chinese: 建设一路) is a metro station on Line 2 of the Hangzhou Metro in China. It is located in the Xiaoshan District of Hangzhou. This station has four exits.
