= Fengtan Road station =

Metro station in China

Fengtan Road 丰潭路
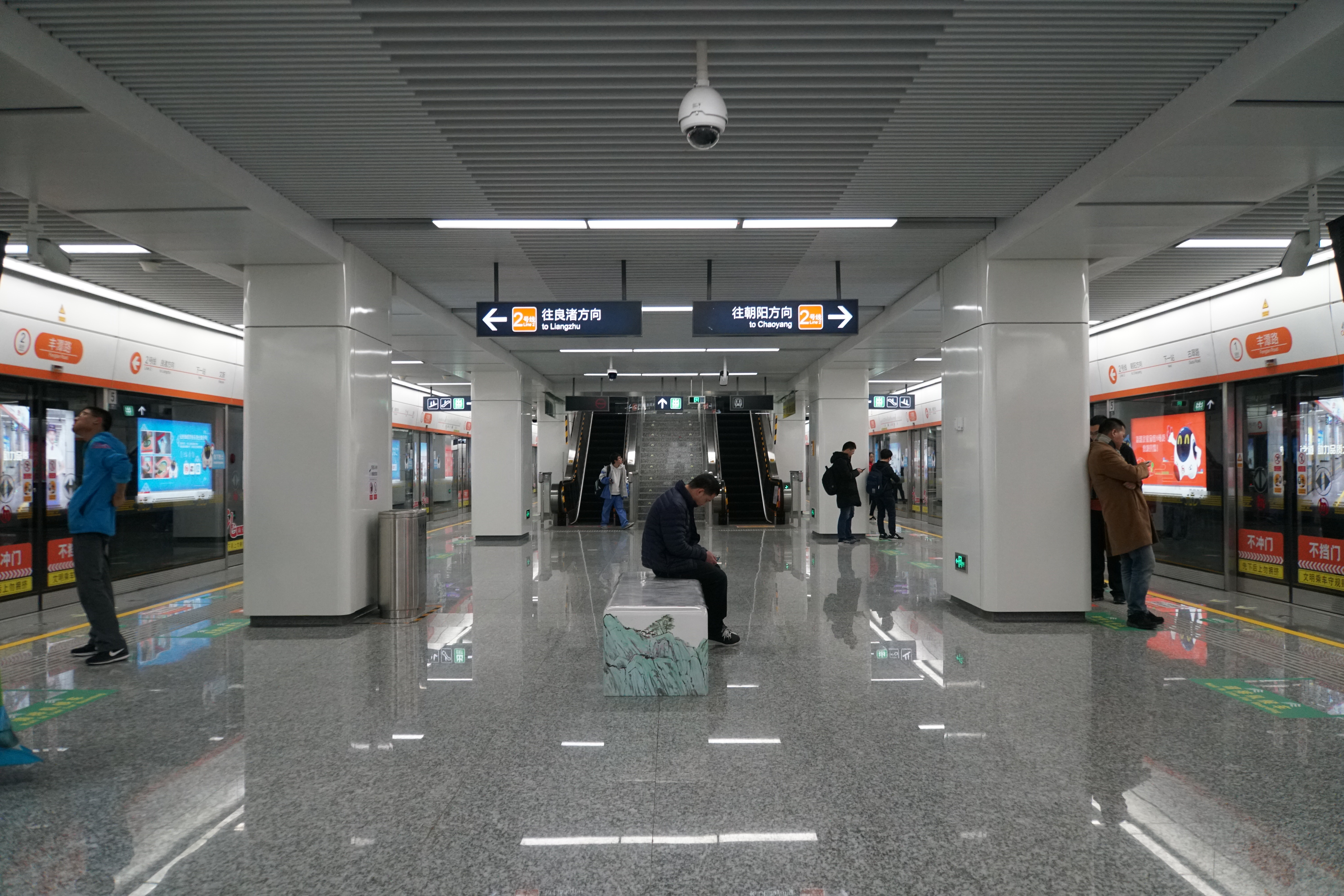

General information
- Location: Xihu District, Hangzhou, Zhejiang; China
- Operated by: Hangzhou Metro Corporation
- Line: Line 2
- Platforms: 2 (1 island platform)

History
- Opened: December 27, 2017

Services
| Preceding station | Hangzhou Metro | Following station |
|---|---|---|
| Gucui Road towards Chaoyang | Line 2 | Wenxin towards Liangzhu |
Location

Fengtan Road (Chinese: 丰潭路) is a metro station on Line 2 of the Hangzhou Metro in China. It is located in the Xihu District of Hangzhou.
