= Sanba station =

Metro station in Hangzhou, China

Sanba 三坝
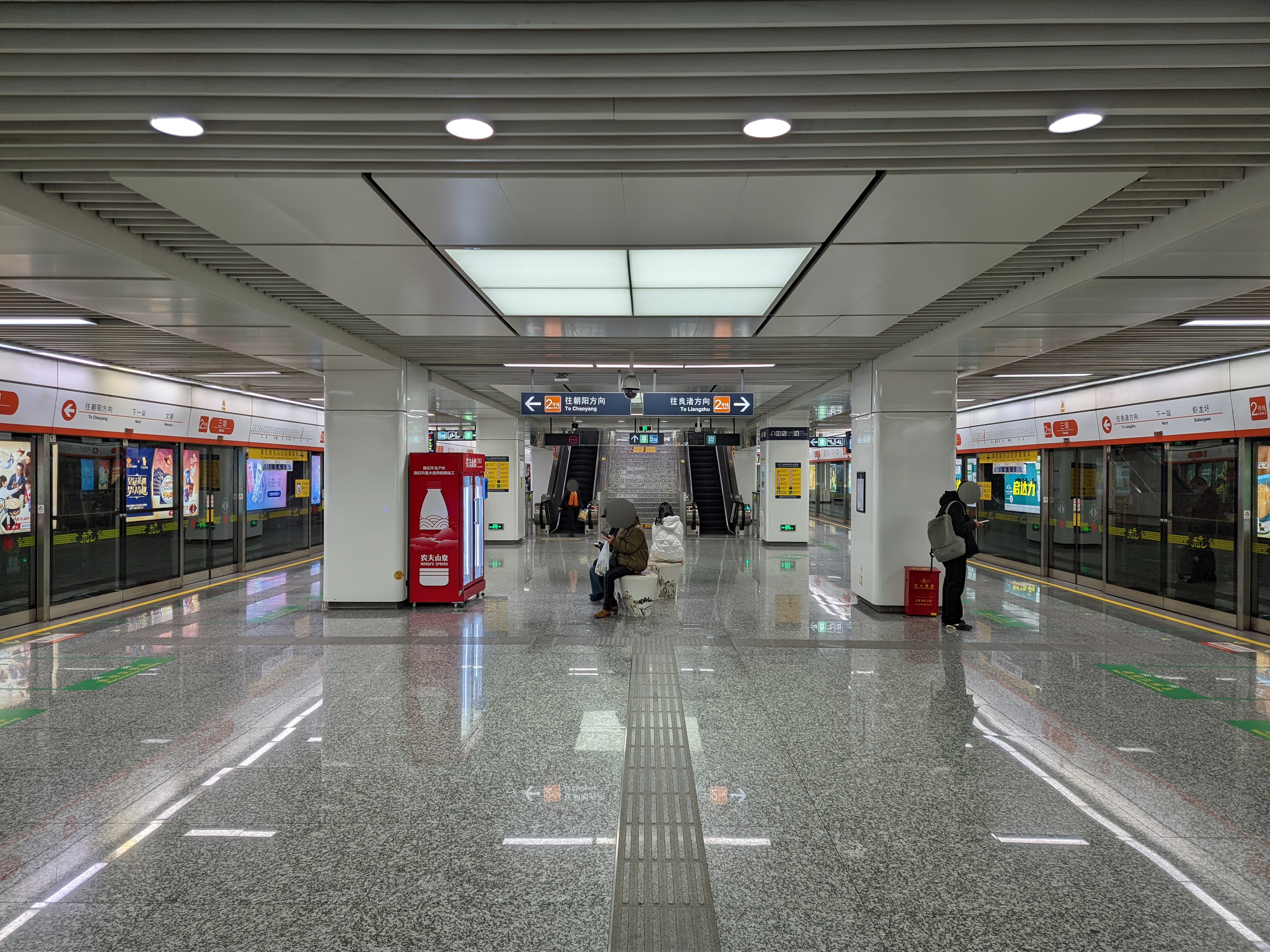
- Platforms of Line 2

General information
- Location: Gudun Road × Pingshui Street; Xihu District, Hangzhou, Zhejiang; China
- Coordinates: 30°18′09″N 120°05′35″E
- System: Hangzhou metro station
- Operator: Hangzhou Metro Corporation; Hangzhou MTR Line 5 Corporation
- Lines: Line 2 Line 5
- Platforms: 4 (2 island platforms)

Construction
- Structure type: Underground
- Accessible: Yes

History
- Opened: December 27, 2017

Services
| Preceding station | Hangzhou Metro | Following station |
|---|---|---|
| Wenxin towards Chaoyang | Line 2 | Xialongwei towards Liangzhu |
| Zijingang Campus, Zhejiang University towards East Nanhu | Line 5 | Pingshui Street towards Guniangqiao |
Location

Sanba (simplified Chinese: 三坝; traditional Chinese: 三壩) is a metro station on Line 2 and Line 5 of the Hangzhou Metro in China. It is located in the Xihu District of Hangzhou.

== Station layout ==
Sanba has three levels: a concourse, and separate levels for lines 2 and 5. Each of these consists of an island platform with two tracks.

== Entrances/exits ==
- A: east side of Gudun Road
- B1: Tongren Jinghua Building
- B2: Tongren Jinghua Building
- B3: Ruibo International
- B4: Grand Palace
- C: west side of Gudun Road, Shengxue Alley
- D: Yaojiang Wending International
- F: Tongren Plaza
- G1: Tongren Plaza
