= Qingchun Square station =

Metro station in Hangzhou, China

Qingchun Square 庆春广场
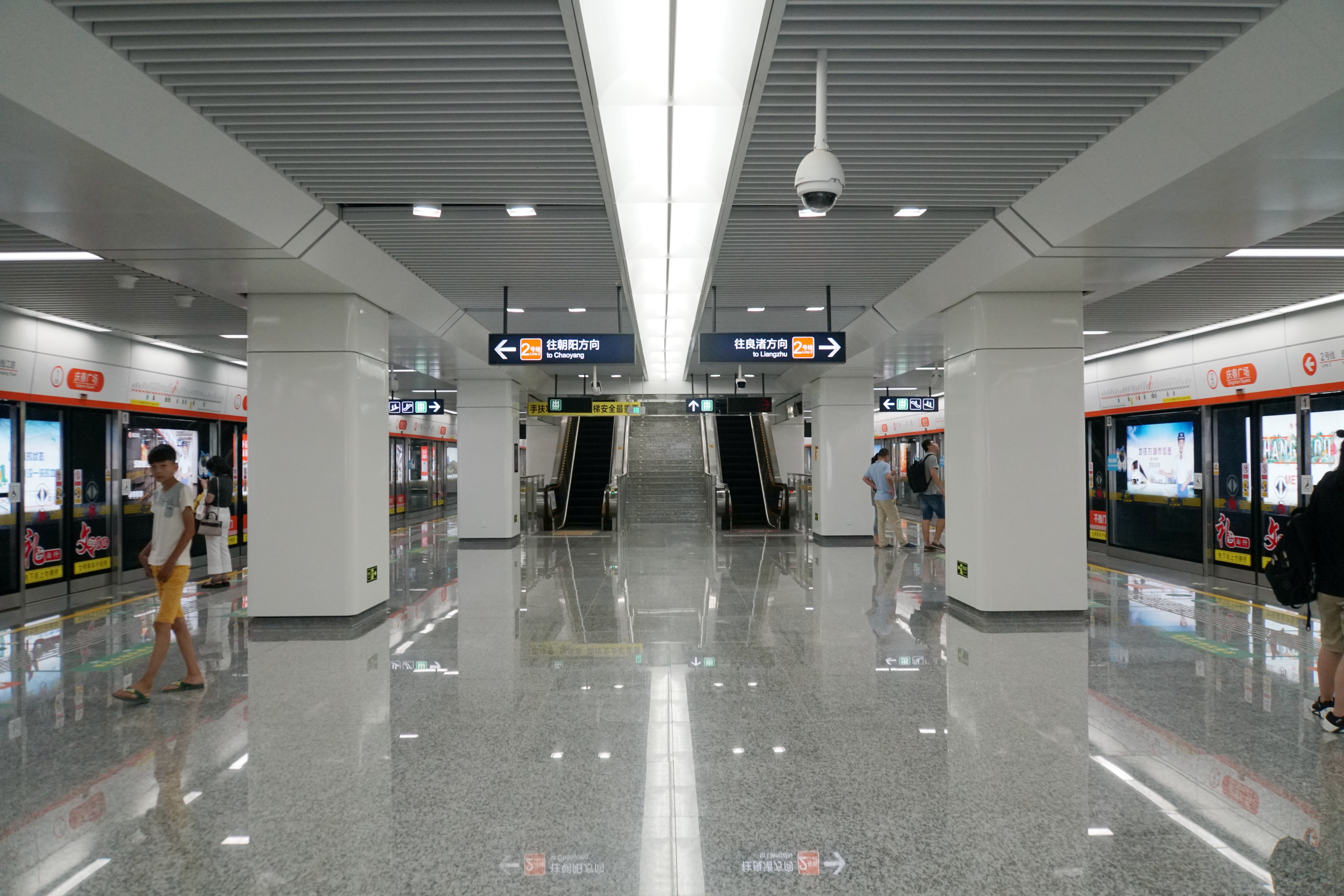

General information
- Location: Jianggan District, Hangzhou, Zhejiang; China
- Coordinates: 30.25999°N 120.20012°E
- Operated by: Hangzhou Metro Corporation
- Line: Line 2
- Platforms: 2 (1 island platform)

History
- Opened: July 3, 2017

Services
Preceding station	Hangzhou Metro	Following station
Qianjiang Road towards Chaoyang	Line 2	Qingling Road towards Liangzhu
Location

Qingchun Square (Chinese: 庆春广场) is a metro station on Line 2 of the Hangzhou Metro in China. It is located in the Jianggan District of Hangzhou and serves the Qingchun Square, its namesake.
