= Dunxiang Street station =

Metro station in China

Coordinates: 30.334°N 120.0828°E

Dunxiang Street 墩祥街
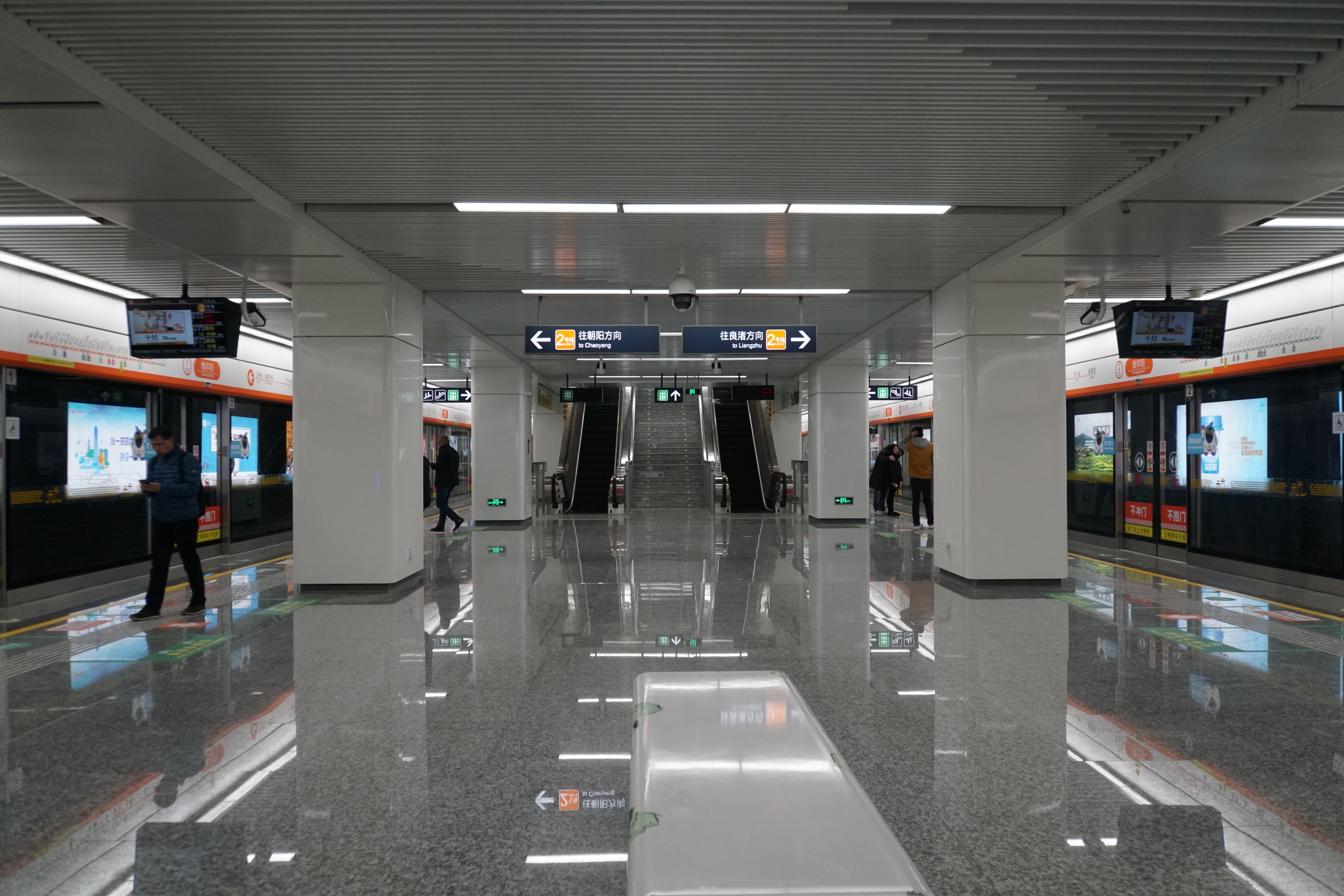

General information
- Location: Gongshu District, Hangzhou, Zhejiang; China
- Operated by: Hangzhou Metro Corporation
- Line(s): Line 2
- Platforms: 2 (1 island platform)

History
- Opened: December 27, 2017

Services
Preceding station	Hangzhou Metro	Following station
Sandun towards Chaoyang	Line 2	Jinjiadu towards Liangzhu

Dunxiang Street (Chinese: 墩祥街) is a metro station on Line 2 of the Hangzhou Metro in China. It is located in the Gongshu District of Hangzhou.
