= Xialongwei station =

Metro station in China

Xialongwei 虾龙圩
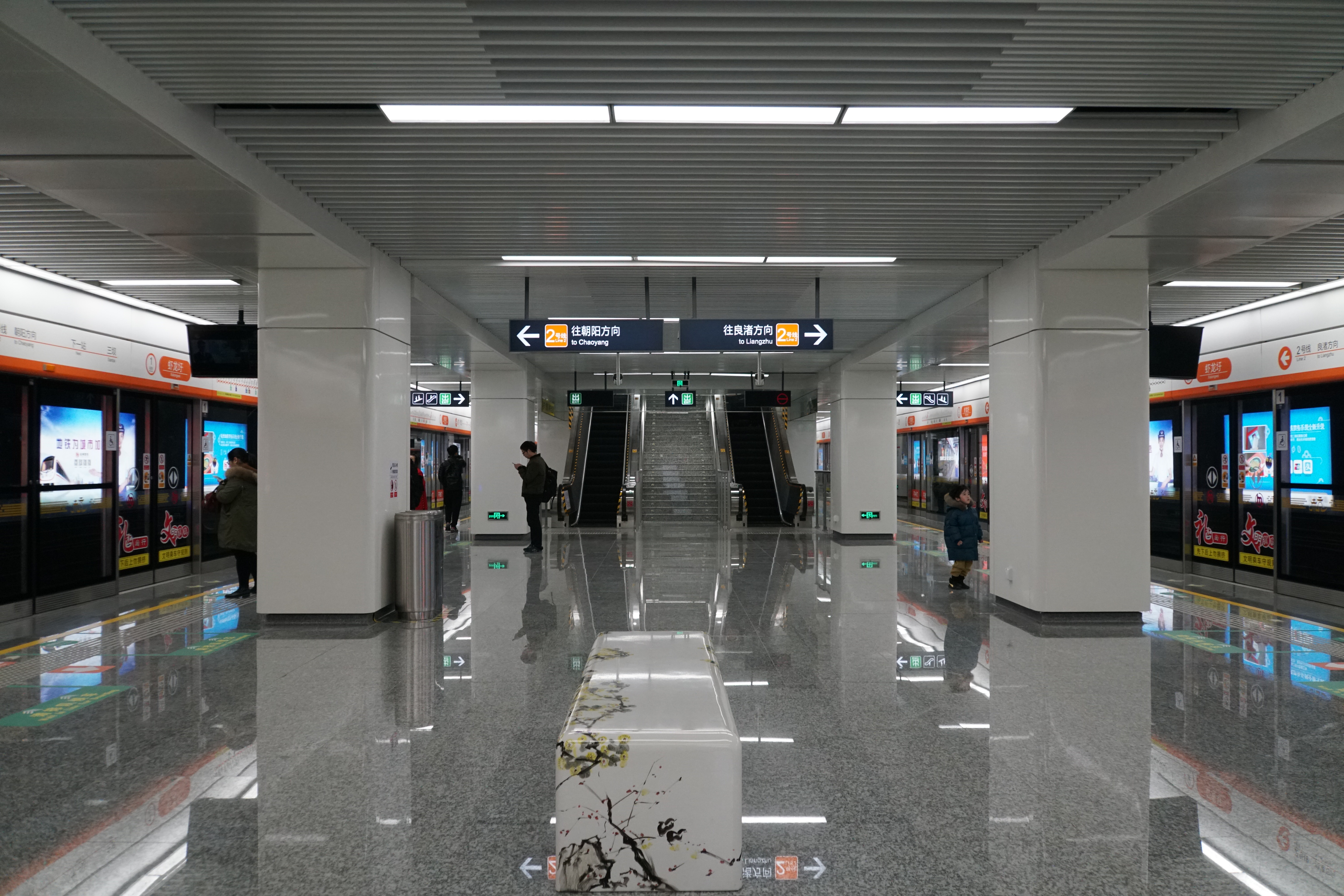

General information
- Location: Xihu District, Hangzhou, Zhejiang; China
- Coordinates: 30.31158°N 120.09156°E
- Operated by: Hangzhou Metro Corporation
- Line(s): Line 2
- Platforms: 2 (1 island platform)

History
- Opened: December 27, 2017

Services
Preceding station	Hangzhou Metro	Following station
Sanba towards Chaoyang	Line 2	Sandun towards Liangzhu

Xialongwei (Chinese: 虾龙圩) is a metro station on Line 2 of the Hangzhou Metro in China. It is located in the Xihu District of Hangzhou.
