= North Zhonghe Road station =

Metro station in Hangzhou, China

North Zhonghe Road 中河北路
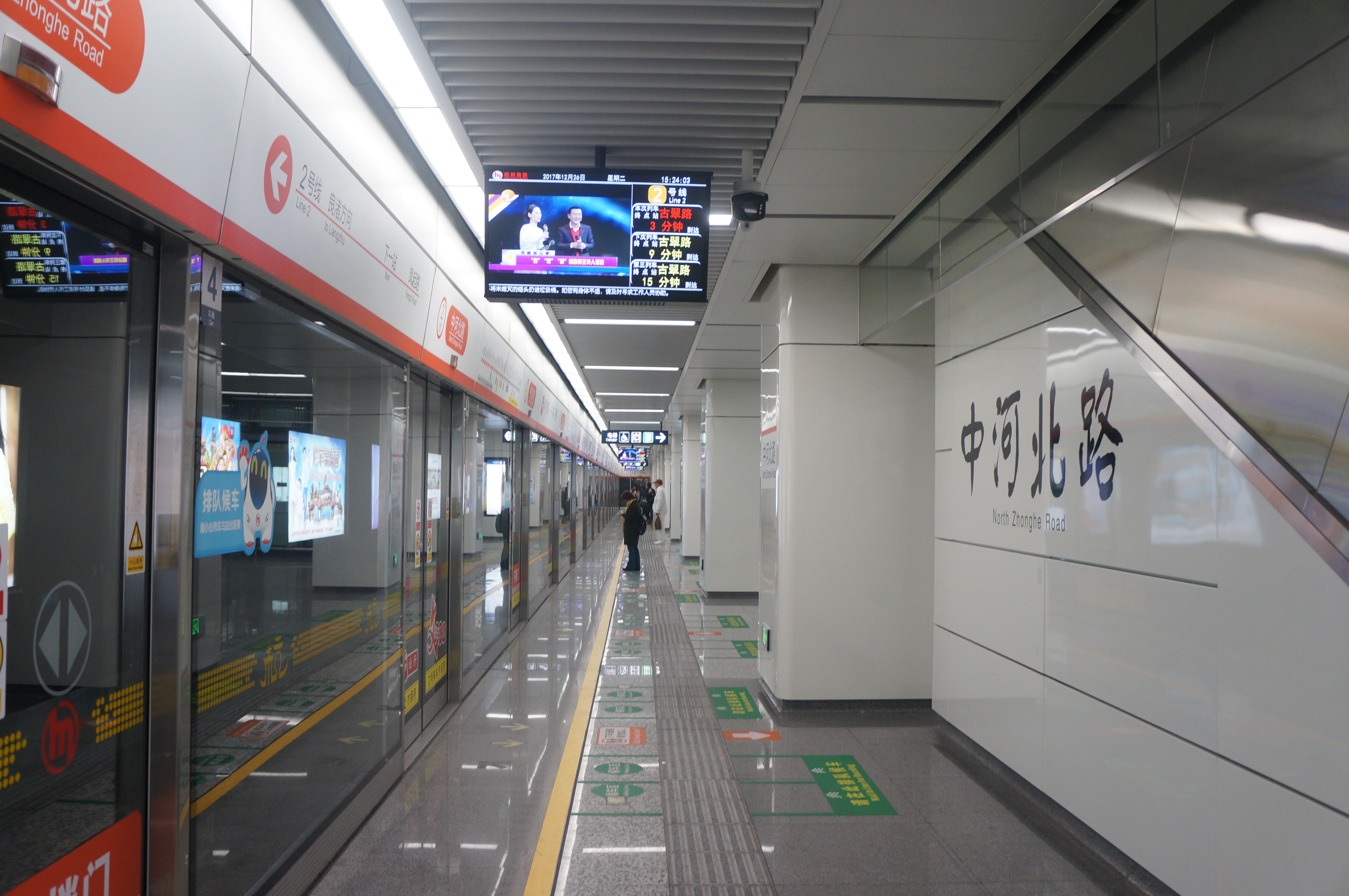

General information
- Location: Xiacheng District, Hangzhou, Zhejiang; China
- Operated by: Hangzhou Metro Corporation
- Line: Line 2
- Platforms: 2 (1 island platform)

History
- Opened: July 3, 2017

Services
Preceding station	Hangzhou Metro	Following station
North Jianguo Road towards Chaoyang	Line 2	Fengqi Road towards Liangzhu
Location

North Zhonghe Road (Chinese: 中河北路) is a metro station on Line 2 of the Hangzhou Metro in China. It is located in the Xiacheng District of Hangzhou.

== Gallery ==
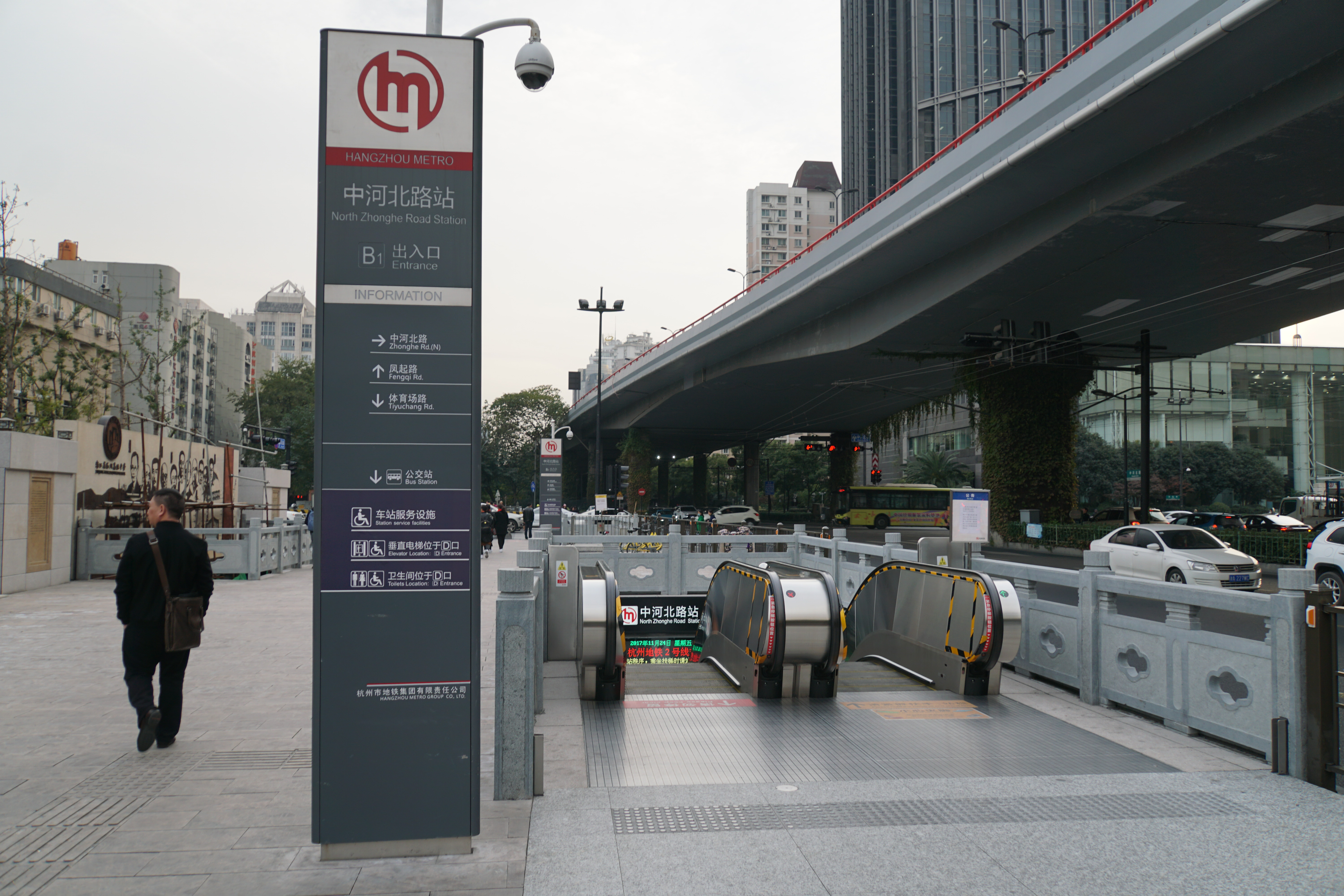
Entrance B1

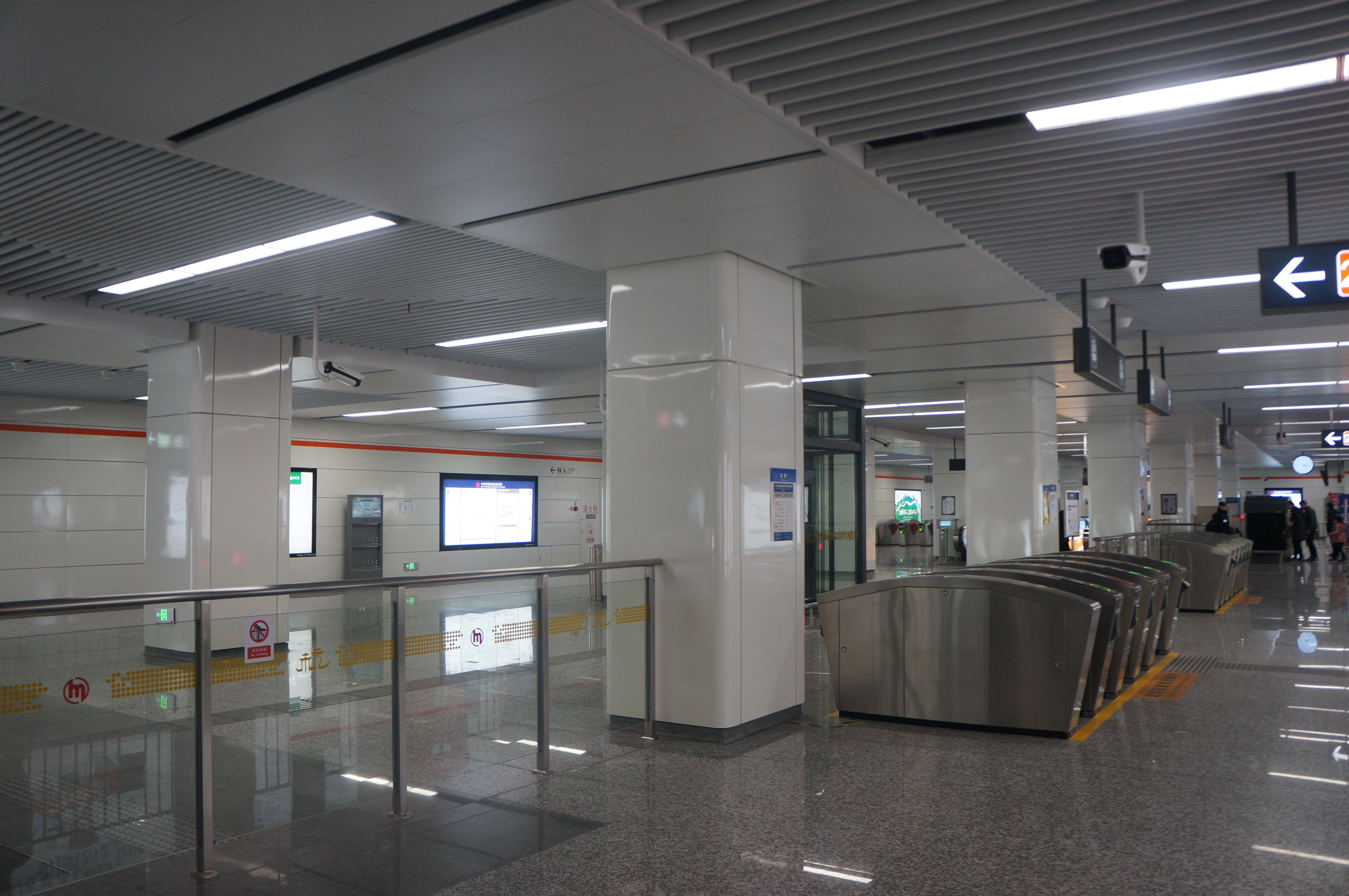
Concourse

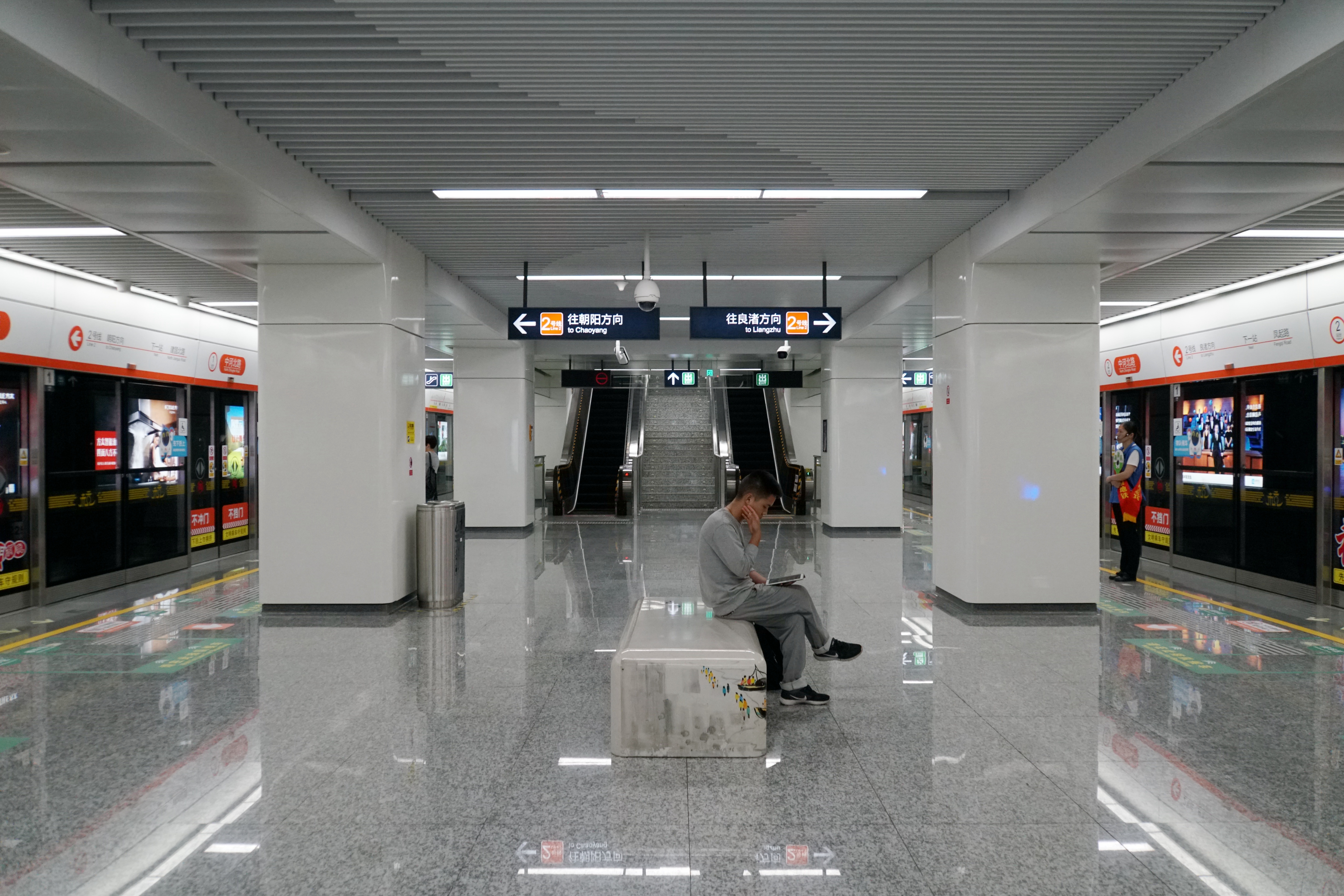
Platforms
