= Baiyang station =

Metro station in China

Coordinates: 30.3535°N 120.068°E

Baiyang 白洋
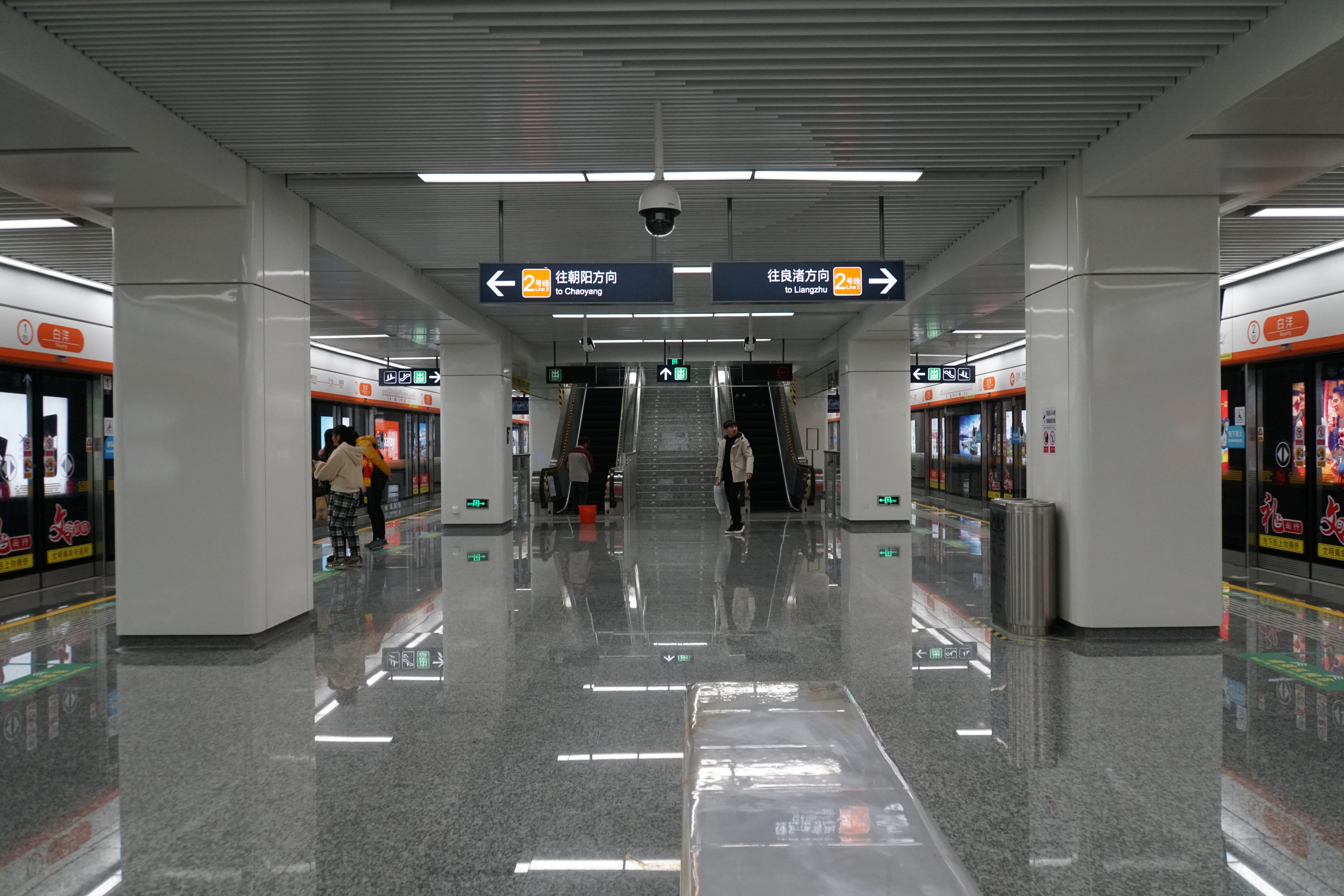

General information
- Location: Yuhang District, Hangzhou, Zhejiang; China
- Operated by: Hangzhou Metro Corporation
- Line(s): Line 2
- Platforms: 2 (1 island platform)

History
- Opened: December 27, 2017

Services
Preceding station	Hangzhou Metro	Following station
Jinjiadu towards Chaoyang	Line 2	Dufucun towards Liangzhu

Baiyang (Chinese: 白洋) is a metro station on Line 2 of the Hangzhou Metro in China. It is located in the Yuhang District of Hangzhou.
