= North Jianguo Road station =

Metro station in Hangzhou, China

North Jianguo Road 建国北路
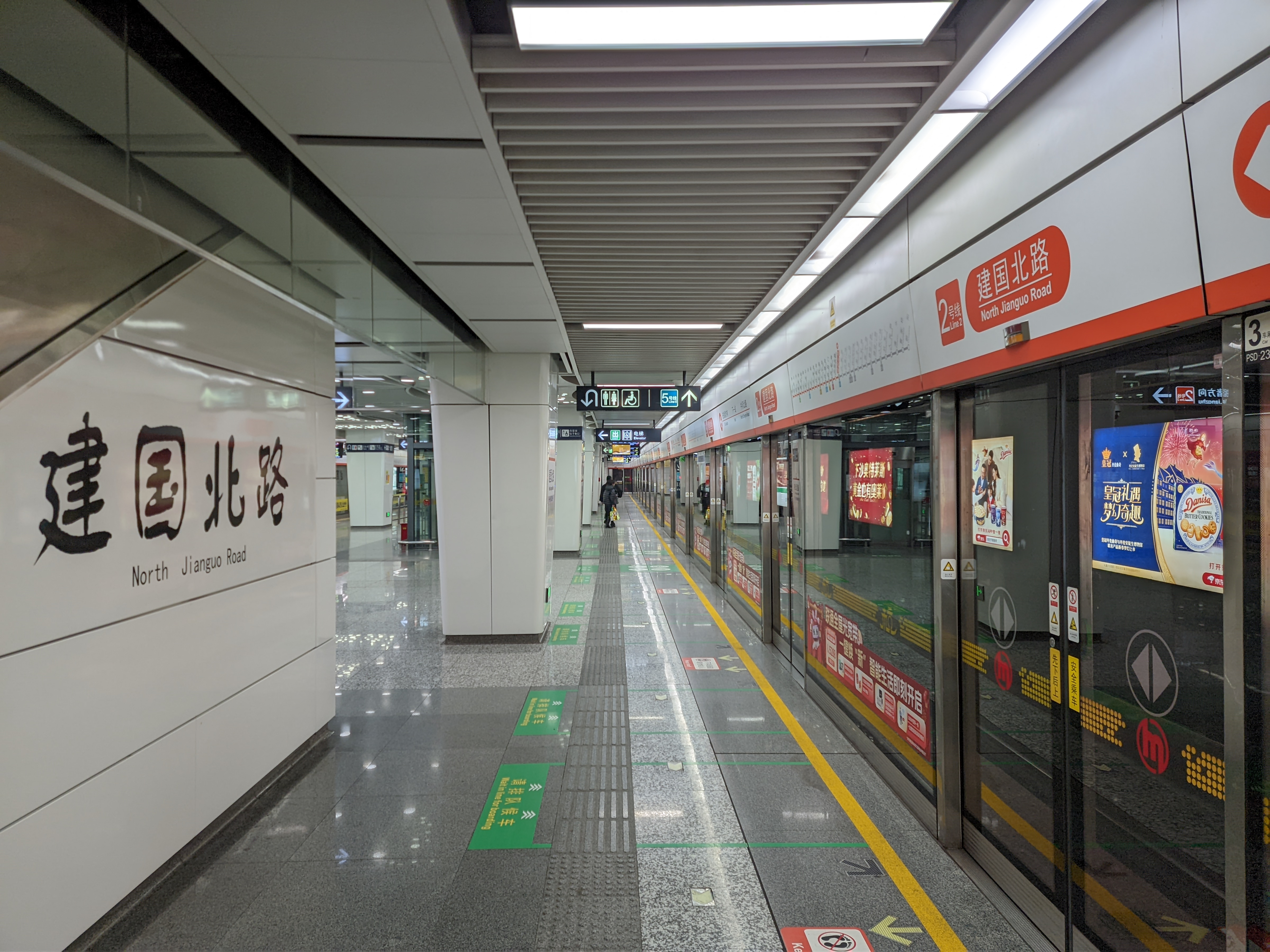
- Line 2 Platforms

General information
- Location: Fengqi Road × Jianguo Road(N); Gongshu District, Hangzhou, Zhejiang; China
- Coordinates: 30.2668°N 120.1769°E
- System: Hangzhou metro station
- Operator: Hangzhou Metro Corporation; Hangzhou MTR Line 5 Corporation
- Lines: Line 2 Line 5
- Platforms: 4 (2 island platforms)

History
- Opened: July 3, 2017 (Line 2); April 23, 2020 (Line 5)

Services
| Preceding station | Hangzhou Metro | Following station |
|---|---|---|
| Qingling Road towards Chaoyang | Line 2 | North Zhonghe Road towards Liangzhu |
| Baoshan Bridge towards East Nanhu | Line 5 | Wan'an Bridge towards Guniangqiao |
Location

North Jianguo Road (simplified Chinese: 建国北路; traditional Chinese: 建國北路) is a transfer station on Line 2 and Line 5 of the Hangzhou Metro in China. It is located in the Gongshu District of Hangzhou.

== Station layout ==
North Jianguo Road has three levels: a concourse, and separate levels for lines 2 and 5. Basement 2 is for line 2, and basement 3 is for line 5. Each of these consists of an island platform with two tracks.

== Entrances/exits ==
- A: Dashu Rd.
- B: east side of Jianguo Road (N)
- C: north side of Fengqi Rd.
- D: south side of Fengqi Rd.
- E1: east side of Jianguo Road (N), south side of Fengqi Road
- E2: west side of Jianguo Road (N), south side of Fengqi Road
- F: south side of Fengqi Rd.

== Gallery ==
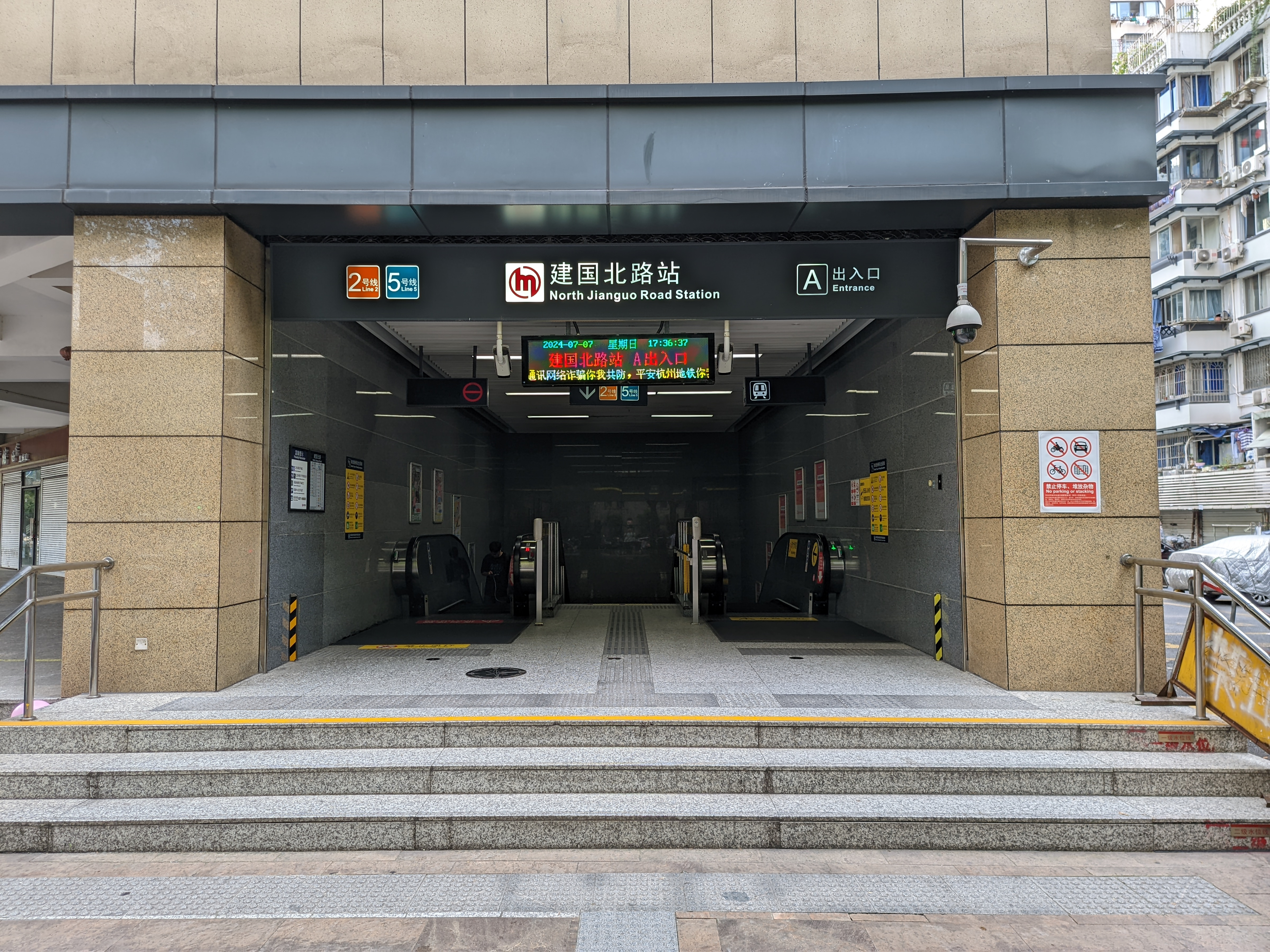
Entrance A

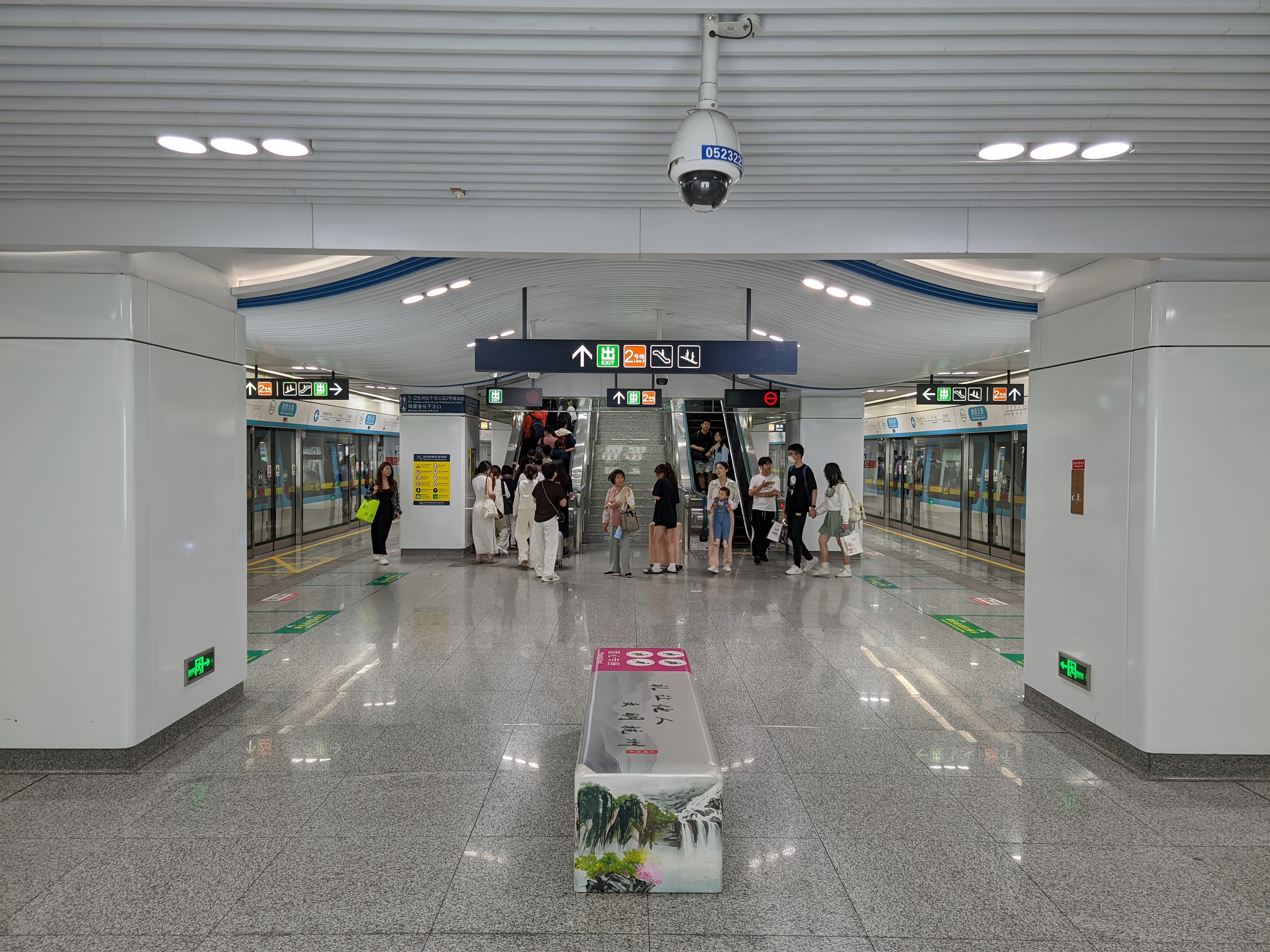
Line 5 platforms
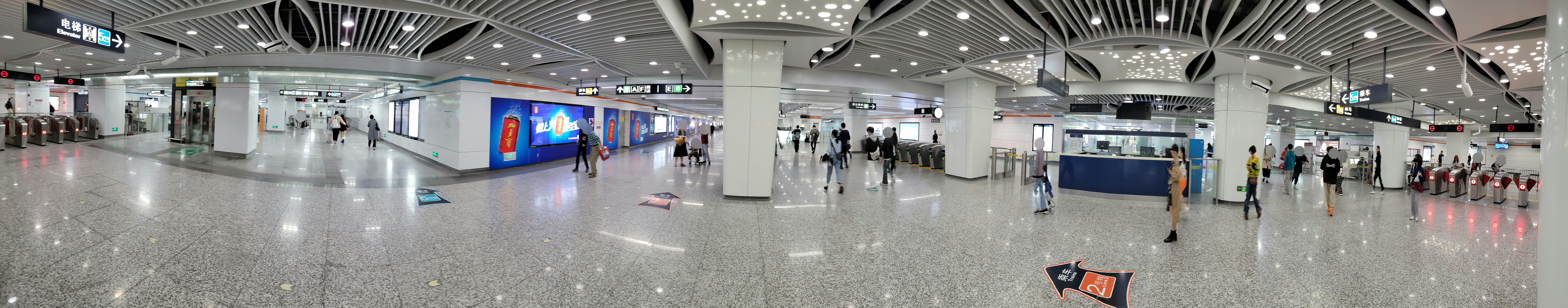
Concourse Panorama
