= Xianing Bridge station =

Metro station in China

Xianing Bridge 下宁桥
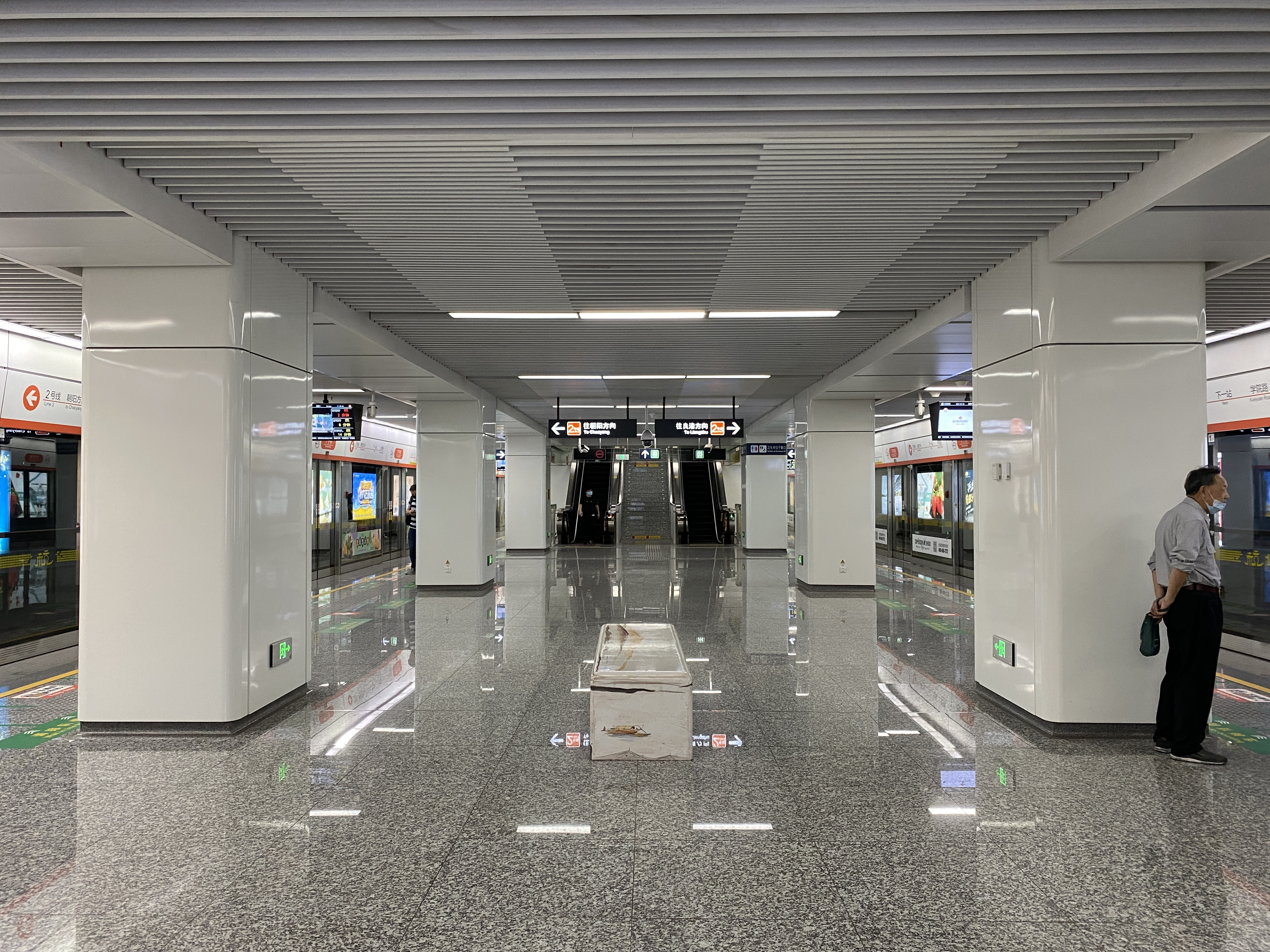
- Platforms

General information
- Location: Wen'er Rd. × Baochu Rd.(N); Xihu District, Hangzhou, Zhejiang; China
- Coordinates: 30.28562°N 120.13513°E
- Operator: Hangzhou Metro Corporation
- Line: Line 2
- Platforms: 2 (1 island platform)

History
- Opened: June 30, 2020

Services
Preceding station	Hangzhou Metro	Following station
Shentangqiao towards Chaoyang	Line 2	Xueyuan Road towards Liangzhu
Route map
Location

Xianing Bridge (Chinese: 下宁桥) is a metro station on Line 2 of the Hangzhou Metro in China. It is located in the Xihu District of Hangzhou.

== Station layout ==
Xianing Bridge has two levels: a concourse, and an island platform with two tracks for line 2.

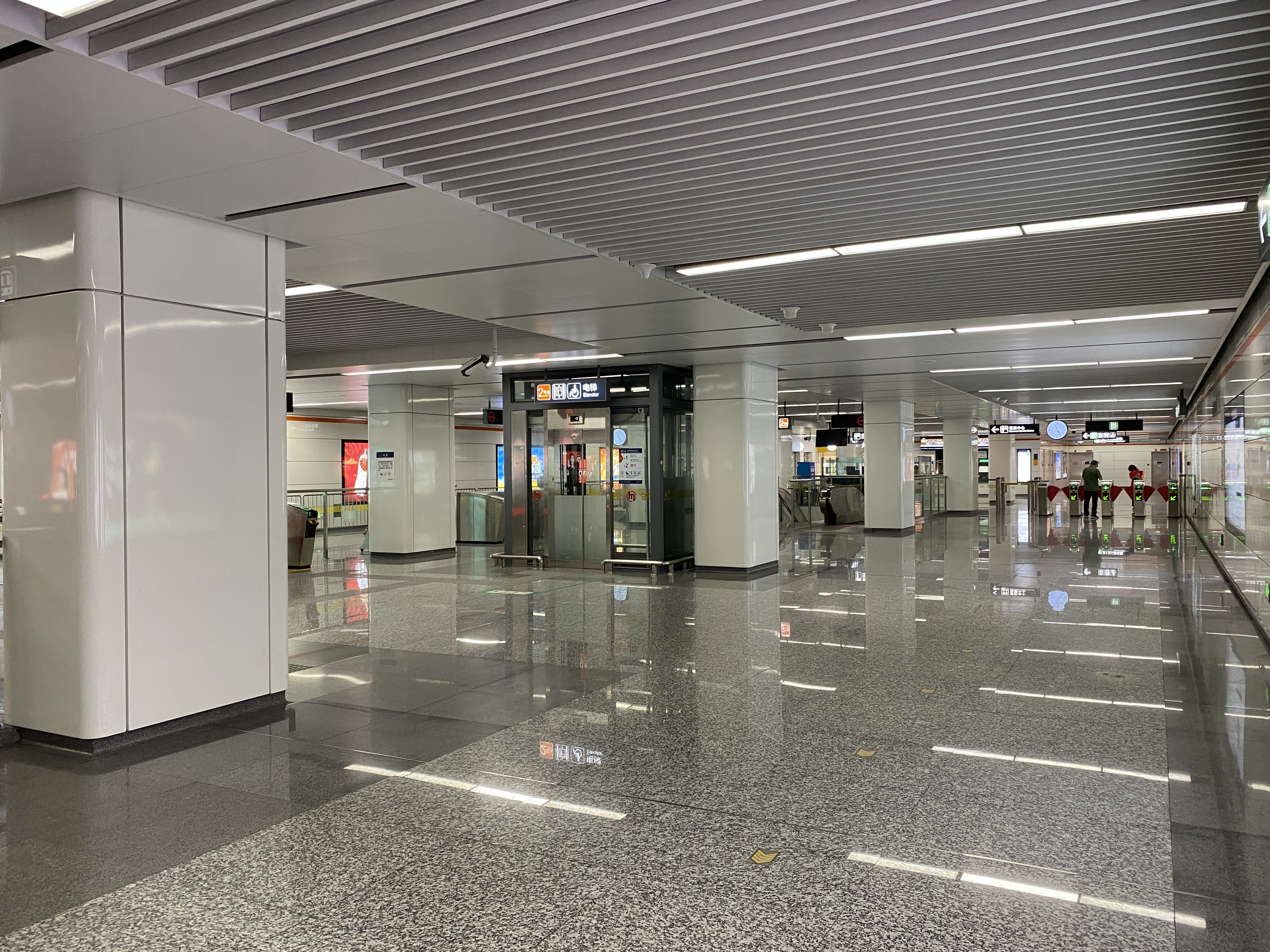
Concourse

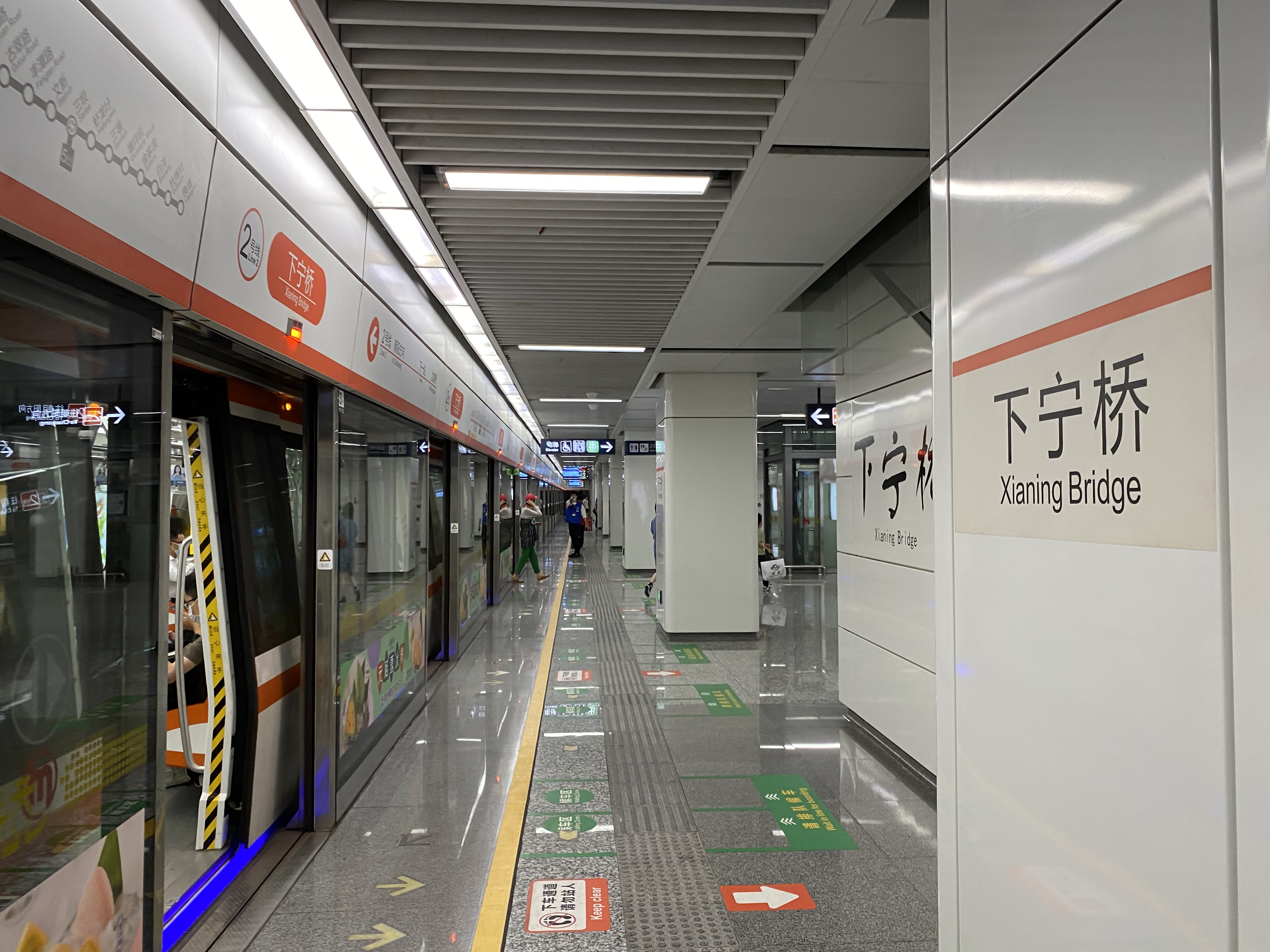
Platforms

== Entrances/exits ==
- A: north side of Wen'er Rd.
- B: south side of Wen'er Rd.
- C: Baochu Rd. (N)
