= Caojiaqiao station =

Hangzhou Metro station

Coordinates: 30°08′13″N 120°15′47″E

Caojiaqiao 曹家桥
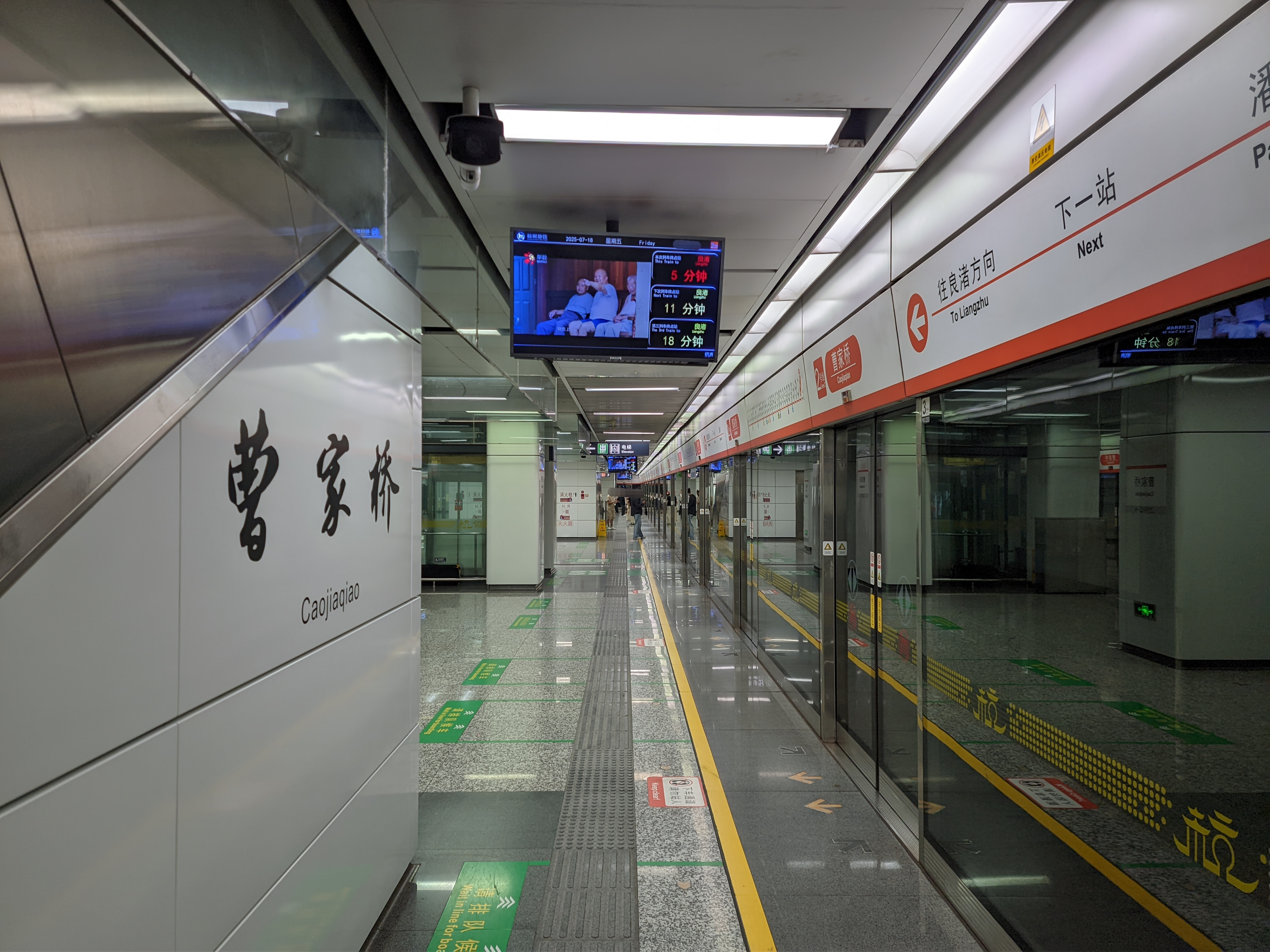
- Platform

General information
- Location: Xiaoshan District, Hangzhou, Zhejiang; China
- Operated by: Hangzhou Metro Corporation
- Line: Line 2

History
- Opened: November 24, 2014

Services
Preceding station	Hangzhou Metro	Following station
Chaoyang Terminus	Line 2	Panshui towards Liangzhu
Location

Caojiaqiao (Chinese: 曹家桥) is a metro station on Line 2 of the Hangzhou Metro in China. It is located in the Xiaoshan District of Hangzhou. This station has four exits.
