= Dufucun station =

Metro station in China

Dufucun 杜甫村
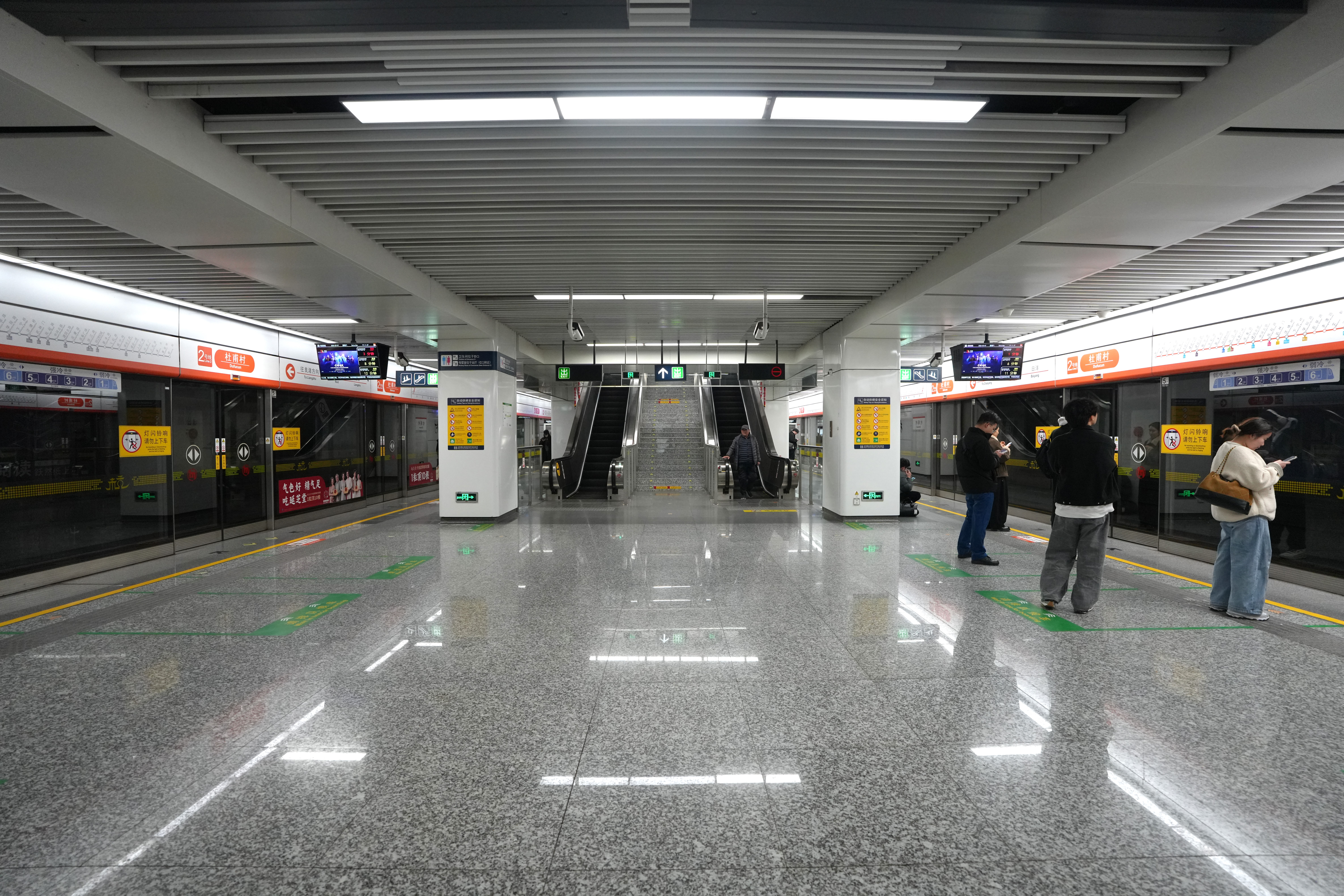

General information
- Location: Yuhang District, Hangzhou, Zhejiang; China
- Coordinates: 30.3613°N 120.0516°E
- Operated by: Hangzhou Metro Corporation
- Line: Line 2
- Platforms: 2 (1 island platform)

History
- Opened: December 27, 2017

Services
Preceding station	Hangzhou Metro	Following station
Baiyang towards Chaoyang	Line 2	Liangzhu Terminus
Location

Dufucun (Chinese: 杜甫村) is a metro station on Line 2 of the Hangzhou Metro in China. It is located in the Yuhang District of Hangzhou.
