= Haoyun Street station =

Metro station in Hangzhou, China

Haoyun Street 好运街
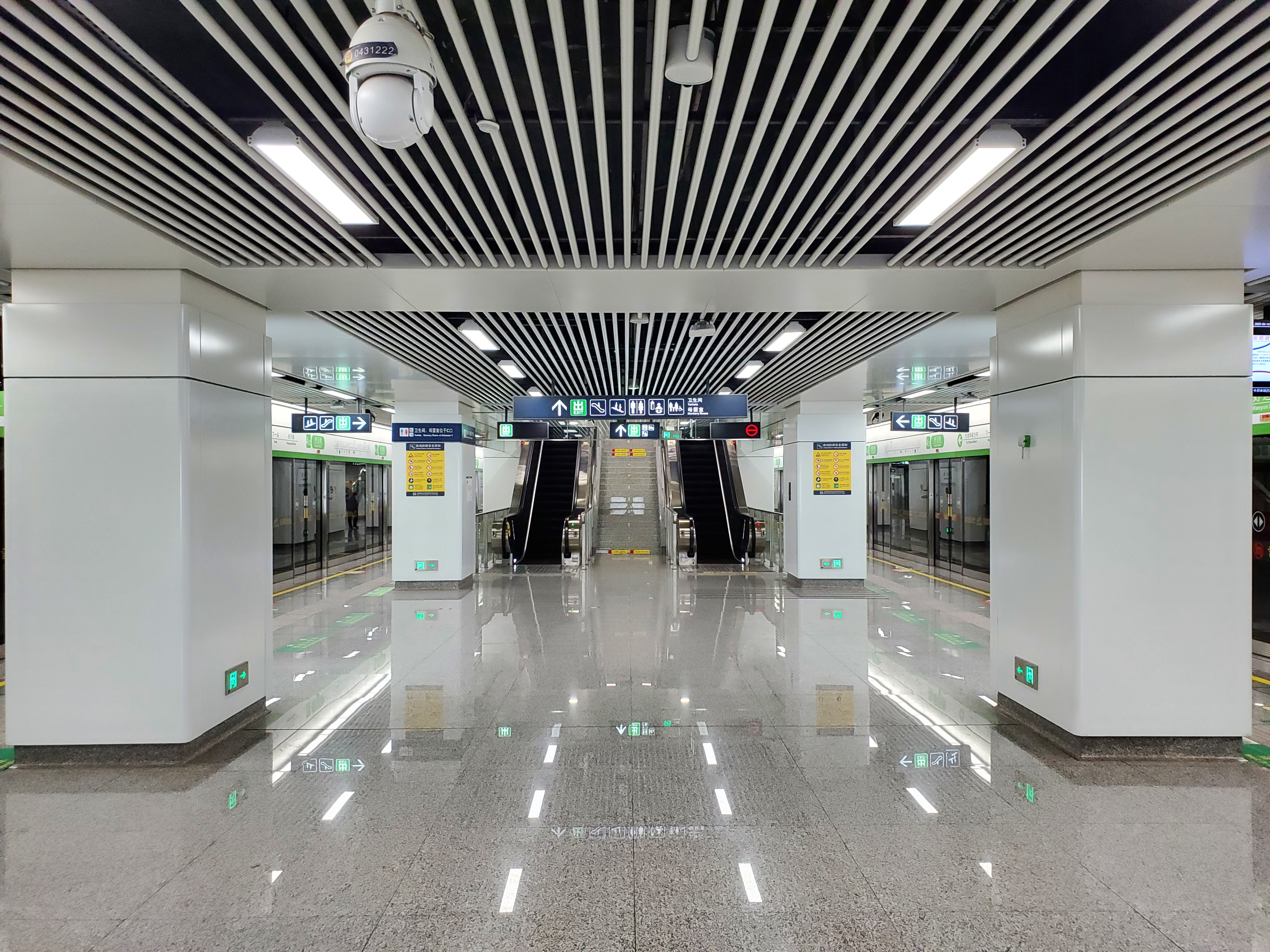
- Platforms

General information
- Location: Yuanzhuang Alley; Yuhang District, Hangzhou, Zhejiang; China
- Coordinates: 30°21′07″N 120°05′41″E
- System: Hangzhou Metro
- Operated by: Hangzhou Metro Corporation
- Line: Line 4
- Platforms: 2 (1 island platform)

Construction
- Structure type: Underground

Other information
- Station code: Yes

History
- Opened: 21 February 2022

Services
Preceding station	Hangzhou Metro	Following station
Hangxing Road towards Puyan	Line 4	Jinjiadu towards Chihua Street
Location

Haoyun Street (simplified Chinese: 好运街; traditional Chinese: 好運街; lit. 'Good Luck Street') is a metro station of Line 4 of the Hangzhou Metro in China. It is located in Gongshu District of Hangzhou. The station was opened on 21 February 2022.

== Station layout ==
Haoyun Street has two levels: a concourse, and an island platform with two tracks for line 4.

== Design ==
The station design integrates multiple elements, drawing inspiration from the traditional courtyard concept of "harmony between man and nature, with water flowing inward." (Chinese: “天人合一，四水归堂”) The four-sloped roof is shaped to resemble this courtyard form, creating a spacious and deep visual effect. It also incorporates the design concept of an urban living room, evoking the scene of the city awakening in the early morning.

== Entrances/exits ==
- A: Yuanzhuang Alley
- C: Yuanzhuang Alley, Dayangba Road
- D1a: east side of Dayangba Road
- D1b: Haoyun Street, west side of Dayangba Road
- D2: Haoyun Street
