= Line 2 (Hangzhou Metro) =

Line of the Hangzhou Metro

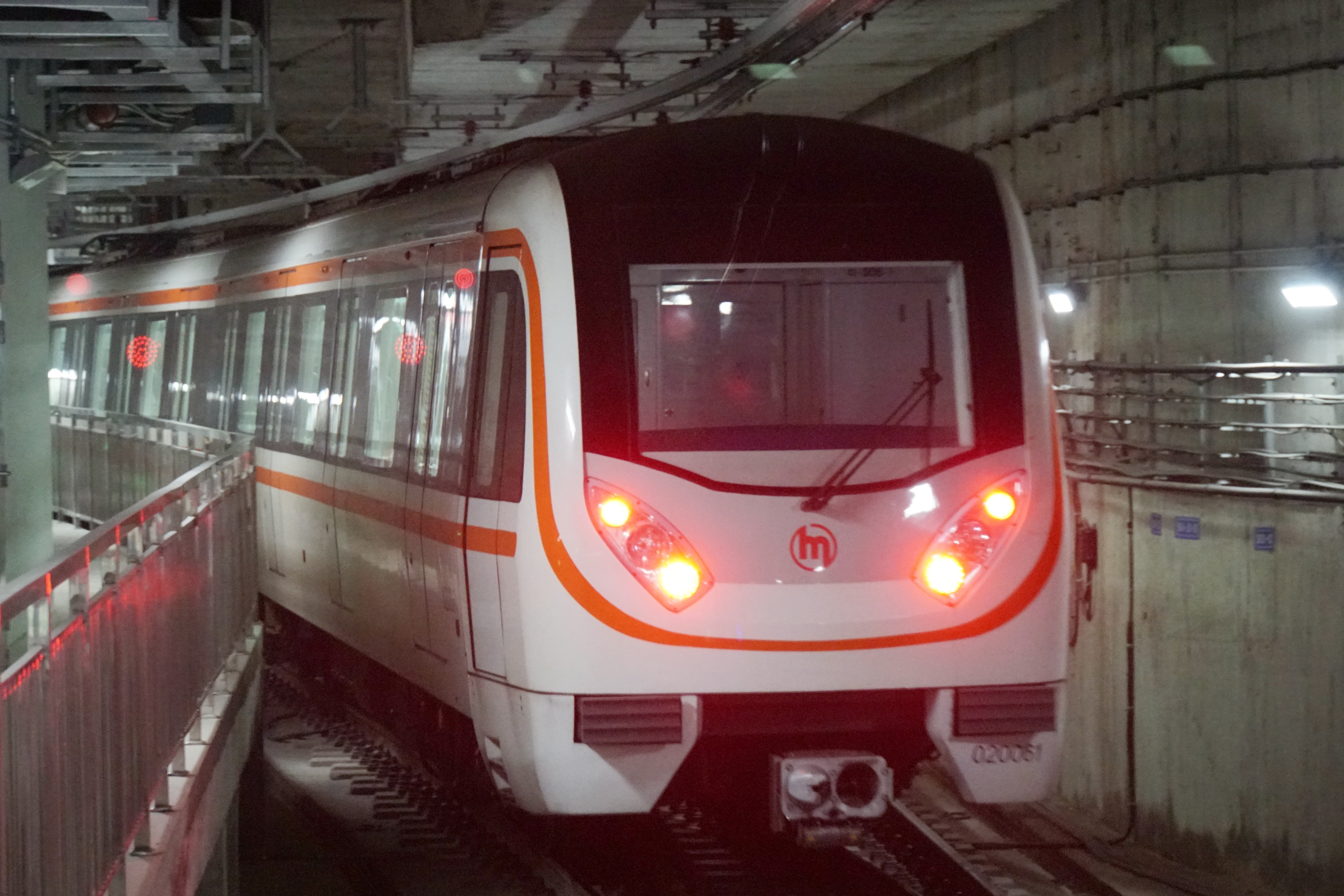
- A train of Hangzhou Metro Line 2

Overview
- Status: Operational
- Owner: City of Hangzhou
- Locale: Hangzhou, Zhejiang, China
- Termini: Chaoyang; Liangzhu
- Stations: 33

Service
- Type: Rapid transit
- System: Hangzhou Metro
- Operator(s): Hangzhou Metro Corporation
- Depot(s): Shushan Depot; Shuangqiao Stabling Yard
- Rolling stock: PM066; PM098; PM134; PM138
- Daily ridership: 747,800 (2020 peak)

History
- Opened: 24 November 2014; 11 years ago

Technical
- Line length: 42.85 km (26.63 mi)
- Number of tracks: 2
- Character: Underground
- Track gauge: 1,435 mm (4 ft 8 1/2 in)
- Electrification: Overhead, 1500 V DC
- Operating speed: 80 km/h (50 mph)
- Signalling: Ansaldo STS CBTC

Line 2 of the Hangzhou Metro (Chinese: 杭州地铁二号线; pinyin: Hángzhōu Dìtiě Èr Hào Xiàn) is a north-south rapid transit line, connecting the downtown with the districts of Xiaoshan and Yuhang in Hangzhou.

The first phase of the line, between Qianjiang Road and Chaoyang stations, entered operation on 24 November 2014 after six years of construction. It was extended to Gucui Road on 3 July 2017, and then to Liangzhu on 27 December in the same year.

During the day, Automatic Train Operation (ATO) is used on the line, which does not require train operators to control the speed of the train manually, however, every night between the hours of 20:30 and 22:30, operators are required to drive the train manually to ensure they still have the ability to drive the train manually in case of exceptional circumstances when ATO is not functional.

== Opening timeline ==
Segment	Commencement	Length	Station(s)	Name
Chaoyang — Qianjiang Road	24 November 2014	18.3 km (11.37 mi)	12	Phase 1 (southeastern section)
Qianjiang Century City	28 April 2016	Infill station	1	
Qianjiang Road — Gucui Road	3 July 2017	11.3 km (7.02 mi)	9	Phase 1 (northwestern section)
Gucui Road — Liangzhu	27 December 2017	13.32 km (8.28 mi)	10	Phase 2 & 3
Xianing Bridge	30 June 2020	Infill station	1	

== Stations ==
Station name		Connections	Location
English	Chinese	Connections	Location
Chaoyang	朝阳		Xiaoshan
Caojiaqiao	曹家桥		Xiaoshan
Panshui	潘水		Xiaoshan
Renmin Road	人民路		Xiaoshan
Hangfachang	杭发厂		Xiaoshan
People's Square	人民广场	5	Xiaoshan
Jiansheyi Road	建设一路		Xiaoshan
Jianshesan Road	建设三路	7	Xiaoshan
Zhenning Road	振宁路		Xiaoshan
Feihong Road	飞虹路		Xiaoshan
Yingfeng Road	盈丰路		Xiaoshan
Qianjiang Century City	钱江世纪城	6	Xiaoshan
Qianjiang Road	钱江路	4 9	Shangcheng
Qingchun Square	庆春广场		Shangcheng
Qingling Road	庆菱路		Shangcheng
North Jianguo Road	建国北路	5	Gongshu
North Zhonghe Road	中河北路		Gongshu
Fengqi Road	凤起路	1	Gongshu
Wulinmen	武林门	3	Gongshu / Xihu
Shentangqiao	沈塘桥	19	Gongshu / Xihu
Xianing Bridge	下宁桥		Xihu
Xueyuan Road	学院路	10	Xihu
Gucui Road	古翠路		Xihu
Fengtan Road	丰潭路		Xihu
Wenxin	文新		Xihu
Sanba	三坝	5	Xihu
Xialongwei	虾龙圩		Xihu
Sandun	三墩		Xihu
Dunxiang Street	墩祥街		Gongshu
Jinjiadu	金家渡	4	Yuhang
Baiyang	白洋		Yuhang
Dufucun	杜甫村		Yuhang
Liangzhu	良渚		Yuhang

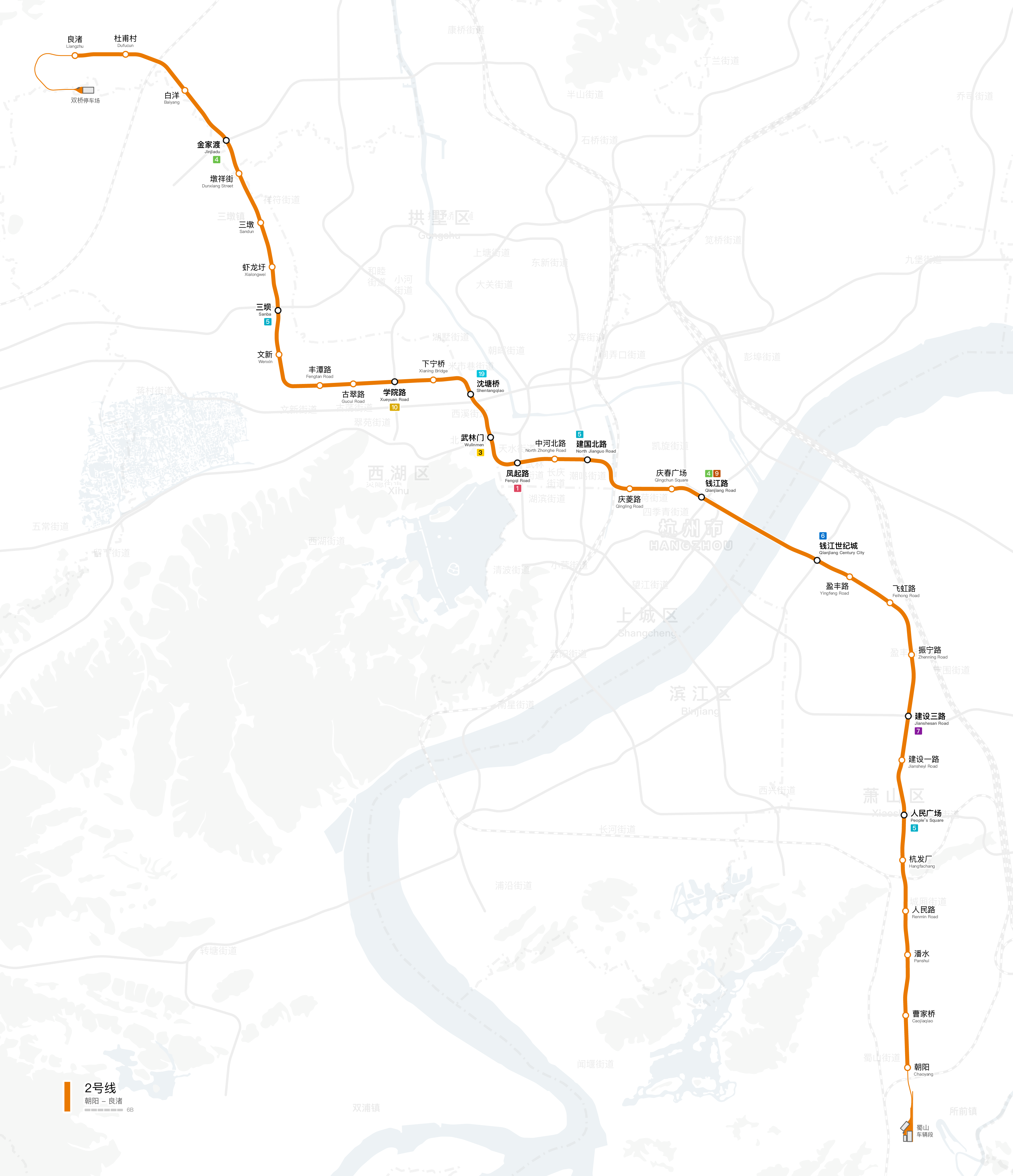
To scale map of Hangzhou Metro Line 2

== Rolling stock ==
Stock	Class	Year built	Builder	Number built	Numbers	Formation	Depots	Line assigned	Notes
PM066	B	2013-2015	CSR Nanjing Puzhen	162 (27 sets)	02 001 - 02 027 (020011-020276)	Tc+Mp+M+M+Mp+Tc	Shushan Depot; Shuangqiao Yard	2	
PM098	B	2016-2017	CRRC Nanjing Puzhen	102 (17 sets)	02 028 - 02 044 (020281-020446)	Tc+Mp+M+M+Mp+Tc	Shushan Depot; Shuangqiao Yard	2	
PM134	B	2018	CRRC Nanjing Puzhen	12 (2 sets)	02 045 - 02 046 (020451-020466)	Tc+Mp+M+M+Mp+Tc	Shushan Depot; Shuangqiao Yard	2	
PM138	B	2019-2020	CRRC Nanjing Puzhen	120 (20 sets)	02 047 - 02 066 (020471-020666)	Tc+Mp+M+M+Mp+Tc	Shushan Depot; Shuangqiao Yard	2	
