= Chaoyang station =

Chaoyang station may refer to:

- Chaoyang station (Hangzhou Metro), on Line 2 of Hangzhou Metro, China
- Chaoyang station (Ningbo Rail Transit), on Line 3 of Ningbo Rail Transit, China

== See also ==
- Chaoyang railway station (disambiguation)
