= Chaoyang station (Hangzhou Metro) =

Hangzhou Metro station

Coordinates: 30°07′30″N 120°15′49″E

Chaoyang 朝阳
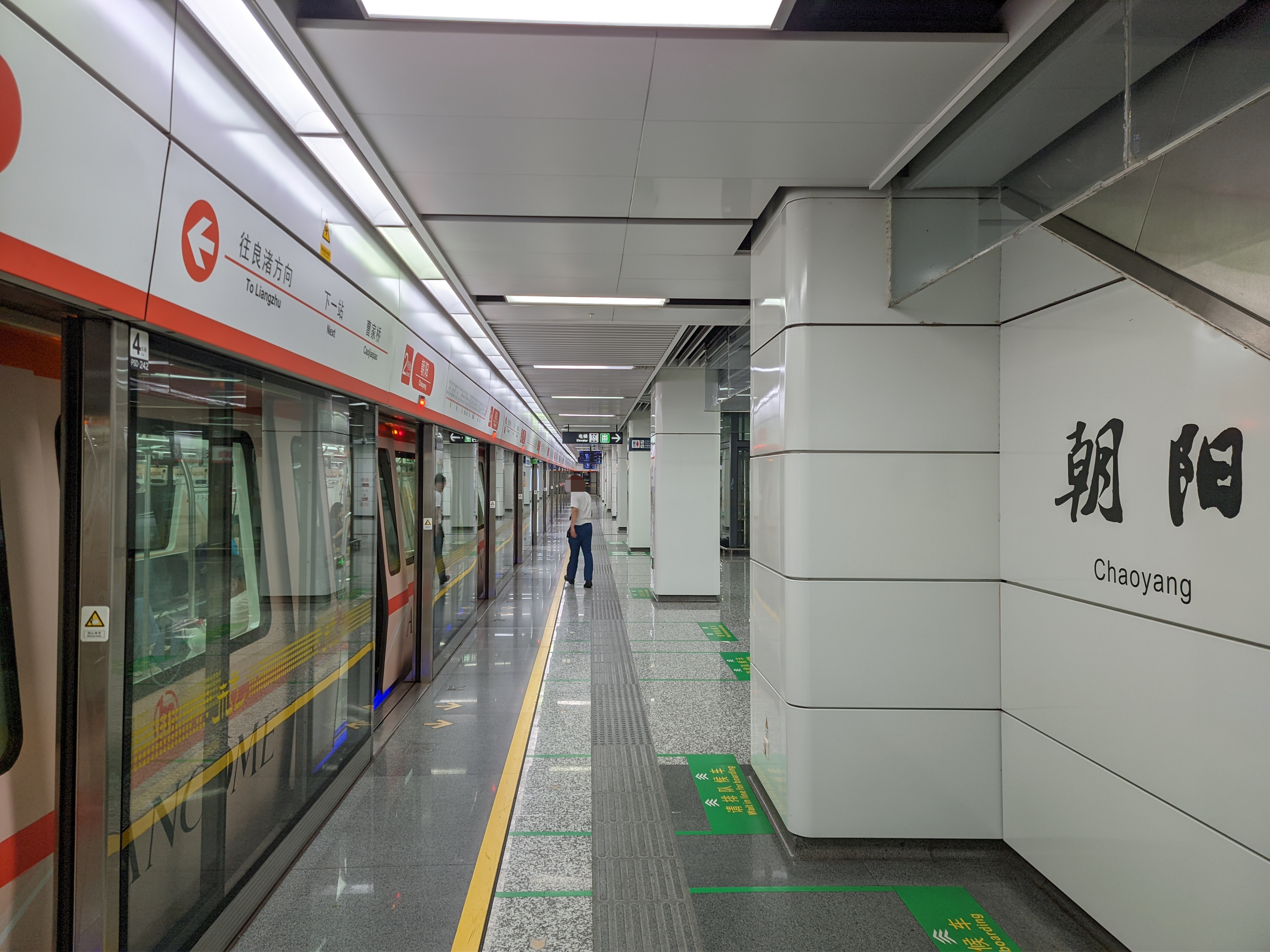
- Platform

General information
- Location: Xiaoshan District, Hangzhou, Zhejiang; China
- Operated by: Hangzhou Metro Corporation
- Line: Line 2

History
- Opened: November 24, 2014

Services
Preceding station	Hangzhou Metro	Following station
Terminus	Line 2	Caojiaqiao towards Liangzhu
Location

Chaoyang (Chinese: 朝阳) is the southern terminus on Line 2 of the Hangzhou Metro in China. It is located in the Xiaoshan District of Hangzhou. This station has three exits.
