= Liangzhu station (Hangzhou Metro) =

Metro station in China

Liangzhu 良渚
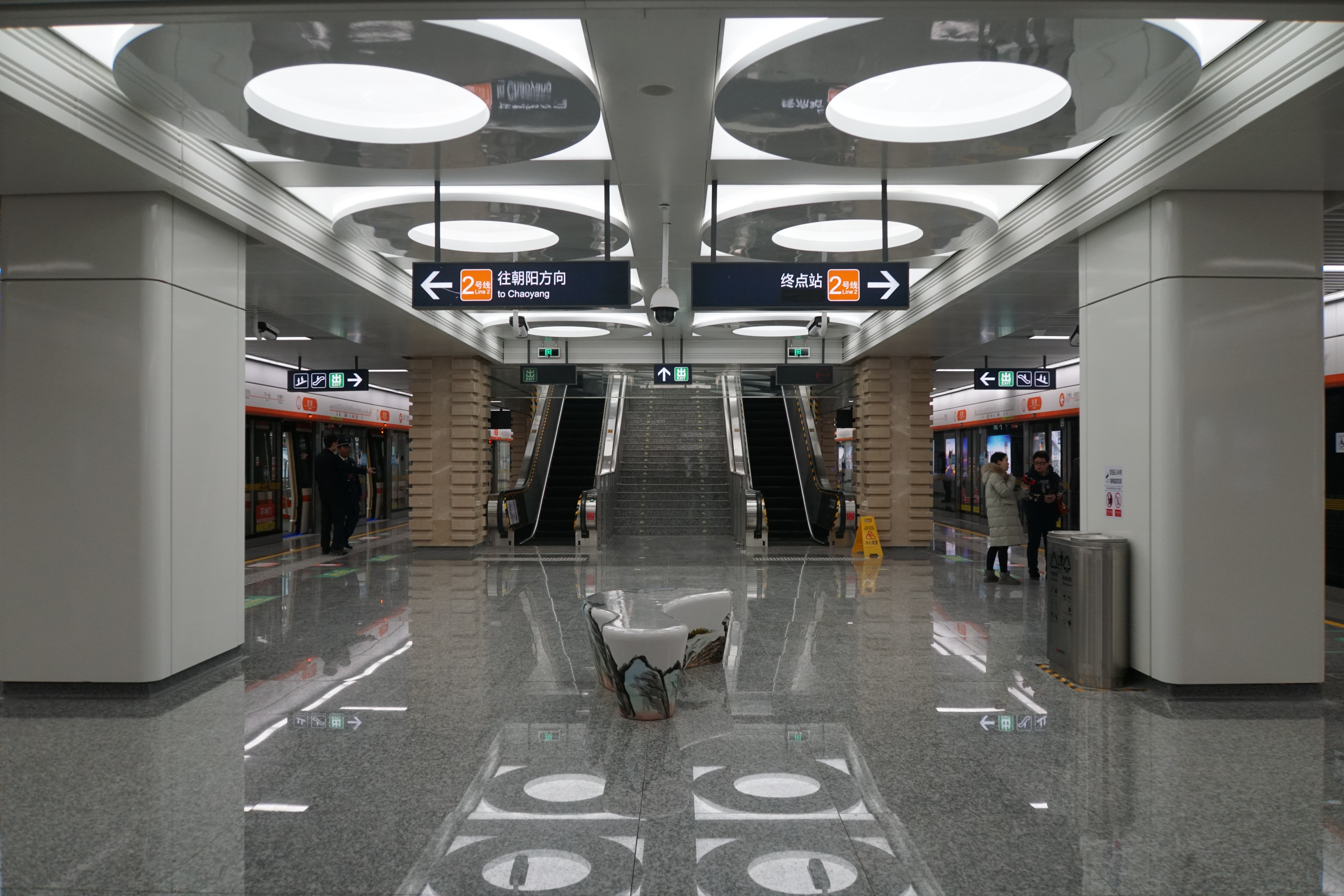

General information
- Location: Yuhang District, Hangzhou, Zhejiang; China
- Operated by: Hangzhou Metro Corporation
- Line: Line 2
- Platforms: 2 (1 island platform)

History
- Opened: December 27, 2017

Services
| Preceding station | Hangzhou Metro | Following station |
|---|---|---|
| Dufucun towards Chaoyang | Line 2 | Terminus |
Location

Liangzhu (Chinese: 良渚) is the northern terminus on Line 2 of the Hangzhou Metro in China. It is located in the Yuhang District of Hangzhou.
