= List of Hangzhou Metro stations =

Map of the Hangzhou Metro

The following is a list of stations found within the Hangzhou Metro.

== All stations ==
Station name		Line(s)			Connections	Opening time
English	Chinese				Connections	Opening time
Xianghu	湘湖	1				24 November 2012
Binkang Road	滨康路	1	5			24 November 2012
Xixing	西兴	1				24 November 2012
Binhe Road	滨和路	1				24 November 2012
Jiangling Road	江陵路	1	6			24 November 2012
Jinjiang	近江	1	4			24 November 2012
Wujiang Road	婺江路	1				24 November 2012
Chengzhan	城站	1	5		HZH	24 November 2012
Ding'an Road	定安路	1				24 November 2012
Longxiangqiao	龙翔桥	1				24 November 2012
Fengqi Road	凤起路	1	2			24 November 2012
Wulin Square	武林广场	1	3			24 November 2012
West Lake Cultural Square	西湖文化广场	1	3	19		24 November 2012
Datieguan	打铁关	1	5	15		24 November 2012
Zhalongkou	闸弄口	1	18			24 November 2012
East Railway Station	火车东站	1	4		6 19 (East Railway Station (East Square)); HGH	30 June 2013
Pengbu	彭埠	1	4			24 November 2012
Qibao	七堡	1				24 November 2012
Jiuhe Road	九和路	1				24 November 2012
Jiubao	九堡	1				24 November 2012
Coach Center	客运中心	1	9		Hangzhou Coach Center Station	24 November 2012
West Xiasha	下沙西	1				24 November 2012
Jinshahu	金沙湖	1				24 November 2012
Gaosha Road	高沙路	1				24 November 2012
Wenze Road	文泽路	1				24 November 2012
South Wenhai Road	文海南路	1	8			24 November 2015
Yunshui	云水	1				24 November 2015
Xiashajiangbin	下沙江滨	1				24 November 2015
Hangzhou Grand Convention and Exhibition Center	杭州大会展中心	1				30 December 2020
Gangcheng Avenue	港城大道	1				30 December 2020
Nanyang	南阳	1				30 December 2020
Xiangyang Road	向阳路	1				30 December 2020
Xiaoshan International Airport	萧山国际机场	1	7	19	HGH	30 December 2020
Chaoyang	朝阳	2				24 November 2014
Caojiaqiao	曹家桥	2				24 November 2014
Panshui	潘水	2				24 November 2014
Renmin Road	人民路	2				24 November 2014
Hangfachang	杭发厂	2				24 November 2014
People's Square	人民广场	2	5			24 November 2014
Jiansheyi Road	建设一路	2				24 November 2014
Jianshesan Road	建设三路	2	7			24 November 2014
Zhenning Road	振宁路	2				24 November 2014
Feihong Road	飞虹路	2				24 November 2014
Yingfeng Road	盈丰路	2	15			24 November 2014
Qianjiang Century City	钱江世纪城	2	6			28 April 2016
Qianjiang Road	钱江路	2	4	9		24 November 2014
Qingchun Square	庆春广场	2				3 July 2017
Qingling Road	庆菱路	2				3 July 2017
North Jianguo Road	建国北路	2	5			3 July 2017
North Zhonghe Road	中河北路	2				3 July 2017
Wulinmen	武林门	2	3			3 July 2017
Shentangqiao	沈塘桥	2	19			3 July 2017
Xianing Bridge	下宁桥	2				30 June 2020
Xueyuan Road	学院路	2	10			3 July 2017
Gucui Road	古翠路	2				3 July 2017
Fengtan Road	丰潭路	2				27 December 2017
Wenxin	文新	2				27 December 2017
Sanba	三坝	2	5			27 December 2017
Xialongwei	虾龙圩	2				27 December 2017
Sandun	三墩	2				27 December 2017
Dunxiang Street	墩祥街	2				27 December 2017
Jinjiadu	金家渡	2	4			27 December 2017
Baiyang	白洋	2				27 December 2017
Dufucun	杜甫村	2				27 December 2017
Liangzhu	良渚	2				27 December 2017
Wushanqiancun	吴山前村	3				22 September 2022
Tangjiacun	汤家村	3				Unopened
West Railway Station	火车西站	3	12	19	HVU	22 September 2022
North Longzhou Road	龙舟北路	3				22 September 2022
West Wenyi Road	文一西路	3				10 June 2022
Lvting Road	绿汀路	3	5	16		23 April 2022
Chuangming Road	创明路	3				Unopened
Quanfeng	全丰	3				10 June 2022
Gaojiao Road	高教路	3	12			10 June 2022
Liansheng Road	联胜路	3				10 June 2022
Hongyuan	洪园	3				10 June 2022
South Xixi Wetland	西溪湿地南	3				10 June 2022
Huawu	花坞	3				10 June 2022
Dongyue	东岳	3			Hangzhou West	10 June 2022
Gudun Road	古墩路	3				10 June 2022
Gudang Xincun	古荡新村	3				10 June 2022
Gudang	古荡	3				10 June 2022
Huanglong Sports Center	黄龙体育中心	3	10			10 June 2022
Huanglong Cave	黄龙洞	3				10 June 2022
Chaowang Road	潮王路	3				21 February 2022
Xiangji Temple	香积寺	3				21 February 2022
Daguan	大关	3				21 February 2022
Shanxian	善贤	3	5			24 June 2019
Xintiandi Street	新天地街	3	4			21 February 2022
Qilun Square	汽轮广场	3				21 February 2022
Huafeng Road	华丰路	3				21 February 2022
Tongxie Road	同协路	3				21 February 2022
Taohuahu Park	桃花湖公园	3				21 February 2022
Dingqiao	丁桥	3				21 February 2022
Huahe Street	华鹤街	3				21 February 2022
Huangheshan	黄鹤山	3				21 February 2022
Xingqiao	星桥	3				21 February 2022
Shima	石马	3				10 June 2022
Xiaoheshan	小和山	3	12			10 June 2022
Pingfeng	屏峰	3				10 June 2022
Liuxia	留下	3				10 June 2022
Puyan	浦沿	4				9 January 2018
Yangjiadun	杨家墩	4				9 January 2018
Zhejiang Chinese Medical University (Note: Was "Chinese Medical University" until 2020.)	中医药大学	4	6			9 January 2018
Lianzhuang	联庄	4				6 June 2018
Shuicheng Bridge (Note: Was "Shuichengqiao" until 2020.)	水澄桥	4				9 January 2018
Fuxing Road	复兴路	4				9 January 2018
Nanxingqiao	南星桥	4	5			9 January 2018
Yongjiang Road	甬江路	4	18			9 January 2018
Chengxing Road	城星路	4				2 February 2015
Citizen Center	市民中心	4	7			2 February 2015
Jiangjin Road	江锦路	4				2 February 2015
Jingfang	景芳	4	15			2 February 2015
Xintang	新塘	4				28 June 2015
Xinfeng	新风	4				2 February 2015
Mingshi Road	明石路	4				21 February 2022
Liming	黎明	4	18			21 February 2022
Jianqiao Old Street	笕桥老街	4				21 February 2022
South Huazhong Road	华中南路	4				21 February 2022
Gaotingba	皋亭坝	4				21 February 2022
Taoyuan Street	桃源街	4				21 February 2022
Wujiajiaogang	吴家角港	4				21 February 2022
Ducheng Ecopark	独城生态公园	4				26 July 2025
Ping'an Bridge	平安桥	4	15			26 July 2025
Chuyun Road	储运路	4				21 February 2022
Hangxing Road	杭行路	4	10			21 February 2022
Haoyun Street	好运街	4				21 February 2022
Chihua Street	池华街	4				21 February 2022
East Nanhu	南湖东	5				1 January 2025
Jinxing	金星	5				23 April 2020
Gexiang	葛巷	5				23 April 2020
Chuangjing Road	创景路	5	19			23 April 2020
Liangmu Road	良睦路	5				24 June 2019
Cangqian Campus, Hangzhou Normal University (Note: Was "Hangzhou Normal University Cangqian Campus" until April 2020.)	杭师大仓前	5				24 June 2019
Yongfu	永福	5				24 June 2019
Wuchang	五常	5				24 June 2019
Jiangcun	蒋村	5				24 June 2019
Zijingang Campus, Zhejiang University (Note: Was "Zhejiang University Zijingang Campus" until April 2020.)	浙大紫金港	5				24 June 2019
Pingshui Street	萍水街	5				24 June 2019
Hemu	和睦	5	10			24 June 2019
The Grand Canal	大运河	5				24 June 2019
East Gongchen Bridge	拱宸桥东	5				24 June 2019
Xiwen Street	西文街	5				23 April 2020
Dongxinyuan (Note: Was "Xiangjisi Road" (香积寺路) until 26 January 2022.)	东新园	5				23 April 2020
Hangyang	杭氧	5				23 April 2020
Baoshan Bridge	宝善桥	5				1 April 2022
Wan'an Bridge	万安桥	5				23 April 2020
Jiangcheng Road	江城路	5	7			23 April 2020
Houchaomen	候潮门	5				23 April 2020
Changhe	长河	5	6			23 April 2020
Jucai Road	聚才路	5				23 April 2020
Jianghui Road	江晖路	5	18			23 April 2020
Bo'ao Road	博奥路	5				23 April 2020
Jinji Road	金鸡路	5	15			23 April 2020
North Yucai Road	育才北路	5				23 April 2020
Middle Tonghui Road	通惠中路	5				23 April 2020
South Railway Station	火车南站	5			XHH	30 June 2020
Shuangqiao	双桥	5				23 April 2020
Guniangqiao	姑娘桥	5	S1			23 April 2020
West Guihua Road	桂花西路	6				30 December 2020
Gongwang Street	公望街	6				30 December 2020
Yangbeihu (Note: Was "Xinqiao" (新桥) until 30 April 2021.)	阳陂湖	6				30 December 2020
Gaoqiao	高桥	6				30 December 2020
Fuyang Coach Center	富阳客运中心	6				30 December 2020
Shouxiang	受降	6				30 December 2020
Huxiaoxing	虎啸杏	6				30 December 2020
Yinhu	银湖	6				30 December 2020
East Safari Park	野生动物园东	6				30 December 2020
Zhongcun	中村	6				30 December 2020
Zhejiang Conservatory of Music	音乐学院	6				30 December 2020
Xiangshan Campus, China Academy of Art	美院象山	6	12			30 December 2020
West Fenghua Road	枫桦西路	6				30 December 2020
Zhijiang Culture Center (Note: Was "Zhipu Road" (之浦路) until 1 February 2024.)	之江文化中心	6				29 April 2021
Xipu Road	西浦路	6				30 December 2020
Weiye Road	伟业路	6				30 December 2020
Chengye Road	诚业路	6				30 December 2020
Jianye Road	建业路	6				30 December 2020
Jianghan Road	江汉路	6	18			30 December 2020
Xingmin	星民	6				30 December 2020
Olympic Sports Center	奥体中心	6	7			30 December 2020
Expo Center	博览中心	6				30 December 2020
Fengbei	丰北	6	15			21 February 2023
Asian Games Village	亚运村	6				21 February 2023
Sanbao	三堡	6	9			6 November 2021
Tanhua'an Road	昙花庵路	6				6 November 2021
Yuanbaotang	元宝塘	6				6 November 2021
East Railway Station (East Square)	火车东站（东广场）	6	19		1 4 (East Railway Station); HGH	6 November 2021
Goujulong	枸桔弄	6				6 November 2021
Wushan Square	吴山广场	7				1 April 2022
Moyetang	莫邪塘	7				22 April 2022
Guanyintang	观音塘	7				1 April 2022
Xingyi	兴议	7				30 December 2020
Mingxing Road	明星路	7	15			30 December 2020
Xinxing Road	新兴路	7				30 December 2020
Xinhan Road	新汉路	7				30 December 2020
Xinjie	新街	7				30 December 2020
Hehuan Road	合欢路	7				30 December 2020
Yingzhong	盈中	7				30 December 2020
Kanshan	坎山	7				30 December 2020
Xingang	新港	7				30 December 2020
Yongsheng Road	永盛路	7	19			30 December 2020
Xinzhen Road	新镇路	7				30 December 2020
Yipeng	义蓬	7				30 December 2020
Tangxinxian	塘新线	7				30 December 2020
Middle Qingliu Road	青六中路	7	8			30 December 2020
Qicheng Road	启成路	7				30 December 2020
Jiangdong'er Road	江东二路	7				30 December 2020
Gongshang University Yunbin	工商大学云滨	8				28 June 2021
Qiaotoubao	桥头堡	8				28 June 2021
Hezhuang Road	河庄路	8				28 June 2021
Qingxisan Road	青西三路	8				28 June 2021
Cangbeicun	仓北村	8				28 June 2021
Fengloucun	冯娄村	8				28 June 2021
Xinwan Road	新湾路	8				28 June 2021
Xinye Road	新业路	9				1 April 2022
Jianghehui	江河汇	9	15			1 April 2022
Yudao	御道	9	19			1 April 2022
Wubao	五堡	9				14 December 2022
Liubao	六堡	9				14 December 2022
South Hongpu Road	红普南路	9				1 April 2022
Jiumu Road	九睦路	9				1 April 2022
South Qiaosi	乔司南	9				24 November 2012 (Note: As the branch of Line 1, services of Line 9 began on 10 July 2021.)
Qiaosi	乔司	9				24 November 2012
Wengmei	翁梅	9				24 November 2012
Linpingnan Railway Station (Note: Formerly "Yuhang Railway Station" and "Yuhang Hi-Railway Station" (余杭高铁（站）).)	临平南高铁站	9	HH		EVH	24 November 2012
Nanyuan	南苑	9				24 November 2012
Linping	临平	3	9			24 November 2012
Qiushan Avenue	邱山大街	9				17 September 2021
Heyu Road	荷禹路	9				17 September 2021
Wuzhou Road	五洲路	9				17 September 2021
Long'an	龙安	9				17 September 2021
Wensan Road	文三路	10	19			21 February 2023
Cuibai Road	翠柏路	10				21 February 2022
Beida Bridge	北大桥	10				21 February 2022
Huayuangang	花园岗	10				21 February 2022
Dujiaqiao	渡驾桥	10				21 February 2022
Xiangyuan Road	祥园路	10				21 February 2022
Jinde Road	金德路	10				21 February 2022
Yisheng Road	逸盛路	10				21 February 2022
Jiuzhou Street	九州街	16				23 April 2020
Lin'an Square	临安广场	16				23 April 2020
Zhejiang A&F University	农林大学	16				23 April 2020
Qingshanhu	青山湖	16				23 April 2020
Babaili	八百里	16				23 April 2020
Qingshanhu Sci-tech City	青山湖科技城	16				23 April 2020
Nanfeng	南峰	16				23 April 2020
Nanhu	南湖	16				23 April 2020
Zhongtai	中泰	16				23 April 2020
Yuhang Road	禹航路	16				23 April 2020
Fengxin Road	凤新路	16				23 April 2020
Tiaoxi	苕溪	19				Unopened
Haichuangyuan	海创园	12	19			22 September 2022
Jingchang Road	荆长路	19				30 June 2025
North Xixi Wetland	西溪湿地北	19				22 September 2022
Wulian	五联	19				30 November 2023
Yicheng Road	驿城路	18	19			22 September 2022
Pinglan Road	平澜路	19				22 September 2022
Gengwen Road	耕文路	19				22 September 2022
Zhixing Road	知行路	19				22 September 2022
