= Babaili station =

Metro station in China

Babaili 八百里
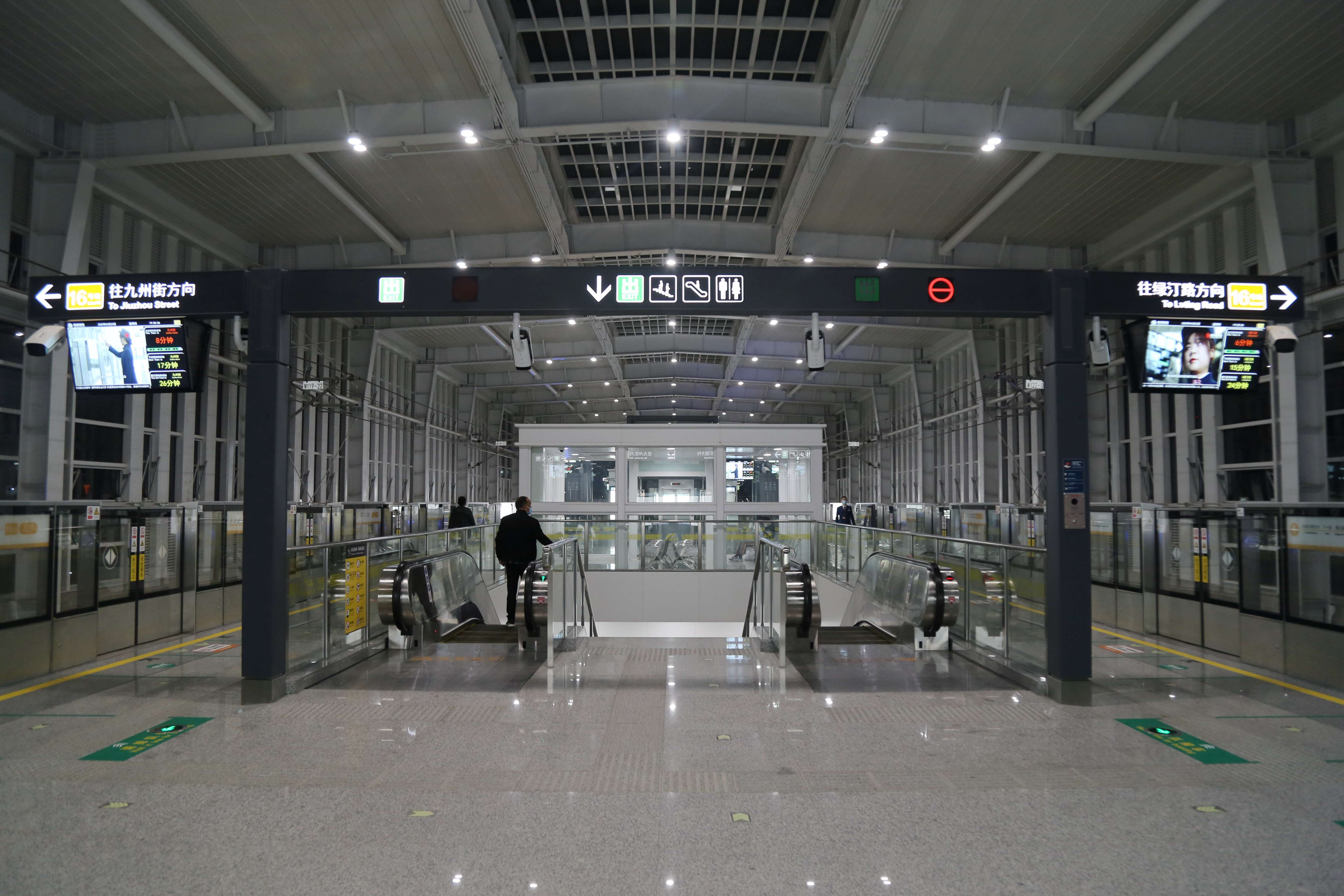

General information
- Location: Lin'an District, Hangzhou, Zhejiang; China
- Coordinates: 30.263619°N 119.773302°E
- Operator: Hangzhou Metro Corporation
- Line: Line 16
- Platforms: 2 (1 island platform)

History
- Opened: April 23, 2020

Services
Preceding station	Hangzhou Metro	Following station
Qingshanhu towards Jiuzhou Street	Line 16	Qingshanhu Sci-tech City towards Lvting Road
Location

Babaili (Chinese: 八百里) is a metro station on Line 16 of the Hangzhou Metro in China. It is located in the Lin'an District of Hangzhou.
