= Qingshanhu Sci-tech City station =

Metro station in China

Qingshanhu Sci-tech City 青山湖科技城
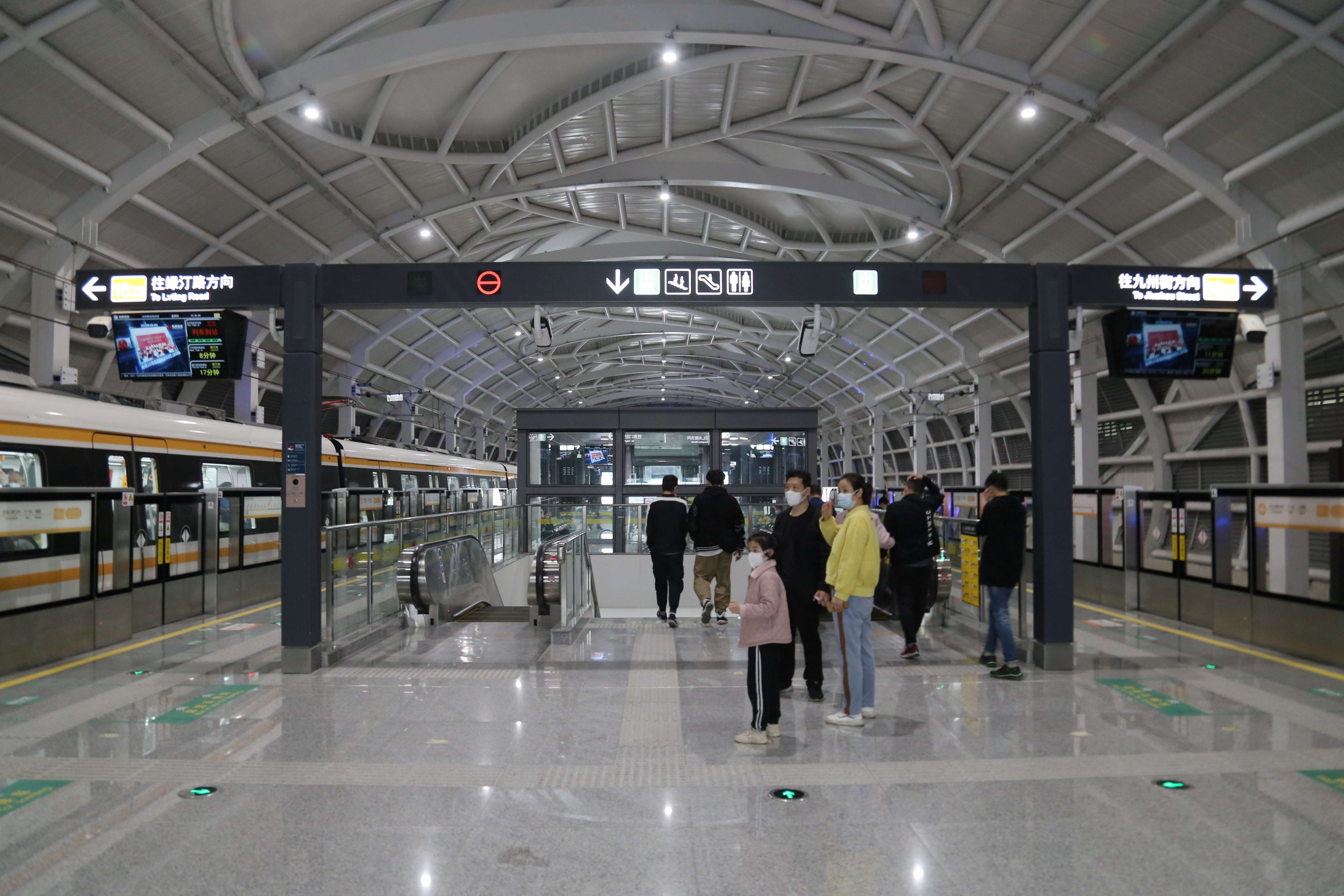

General information
- Location: Lin'an District, Hangzhou, Zhejiang; China
- Coordinates: 30.259464°N 119.821123°E
- Operator: Hangzhou Metro Corporation
- Line: Line 16
- Platforms: 2 (1 island platform)

History
- Opened: April 23, 2020

Services
Preceding station	Hangzhou Metro	Following station
Babaili towards Jiuzhou Street	Line 16	Nanfeng towards Lvting Road
Location

Qingshanhu Sci-tech City (Chinese: 青山湖科技城) is a metro station on Line 16 of the Hangzhou Metro in China. It is located in the Lin'an District of Hangzhou.
