= Qingshanhu station =

Metro station in Hangzhou, China

Qingshanhu 青山湖
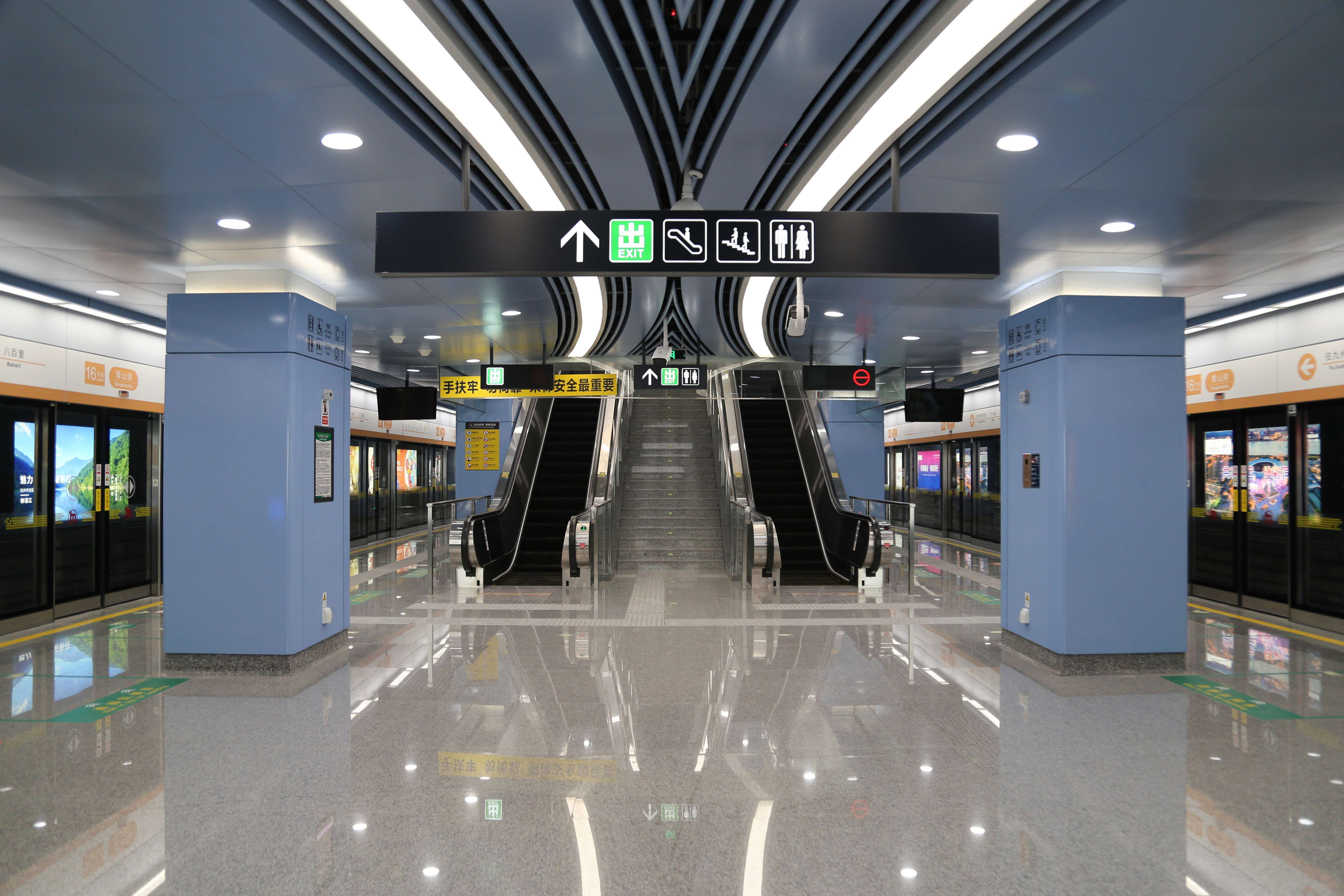
- Platforms

Chinese name
- Chinese: 青山湖站
Transcriptions
Standard Mandarin
- Hanyu Pinyin: Qīngshānhú Zhàn

General information
- Location: Keji Avenue (科技大道); Lin'an District, Hangzhou, Zhejiang; China
- Coordinates: 30°15′30″N 119°45′2″E
- System: Hangzhou Metro
- Operator: Hangzhou Metro Corporation
- Line: Line 16
- Platforms: 2 (1 island platform)
- Tracks: 2

Construction
- Structure type: Underground
- Accessible: Yes

History
- Opened: 23 April 2020

Services
Preceding station	Hangzhou Metro	Following station
Zhejiang A&F University towards Jiuzhou Street	Line 16	Babaili towards Lvting Road
Location

Qingshanhu (Chinese: 青山湖) is a metro station on Line 16 of the Hangzhou Metro in China. It is located in the Lin'an District of Hangzhou.

== Station layout ==
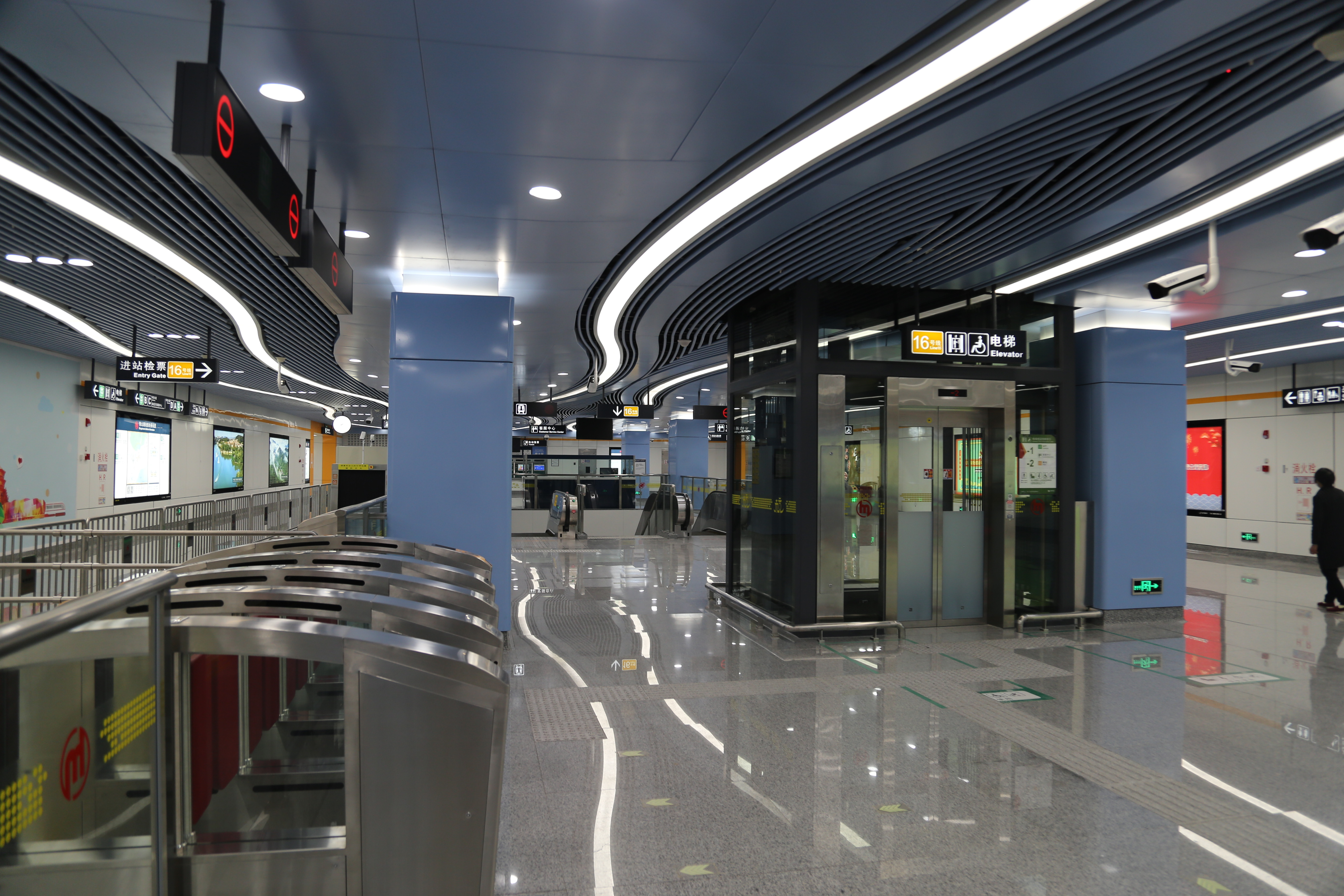
Concourse

Qingshanhu has two levels: a concourse, and an island platform with two tracks for Line 16.

== Entrances/exits ==
- A: north side of Keji Avenue, east side of Yuanqu Road
- B: north side of Keji Avenue
- C: south side of Keji Avenue, west side of Yuanqu Road
- D: south side of Keji Avenue, east side of Yuanqu Road
