= Zhejiang A&F University station =

Metro station in China

Zhejiang A&F University 农林大学
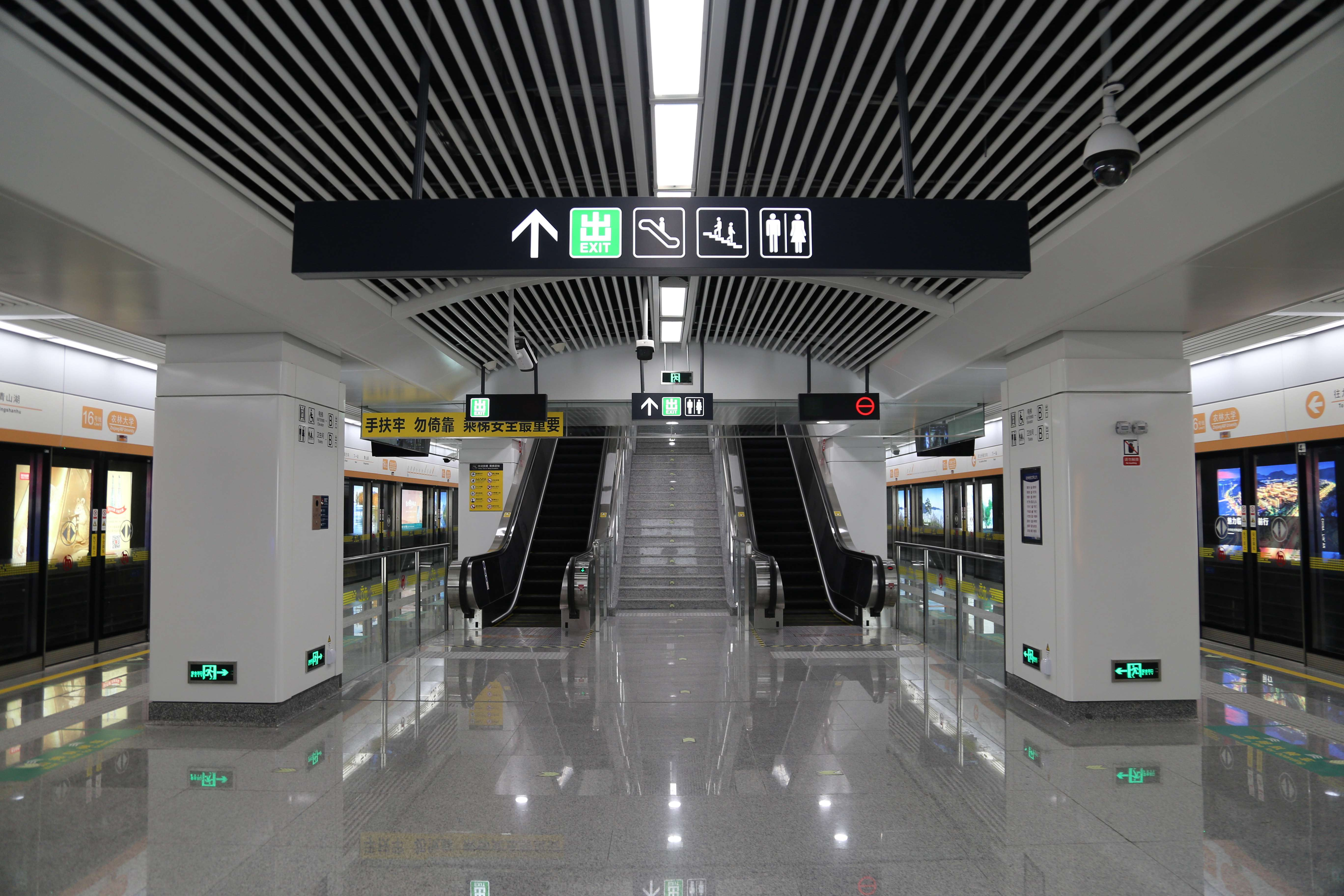

General information
- Location: Lin'an District, Hangzhou, Zhejiang; China
- Coordinates: 30.24697°N 119.7343°E
- Operator: Hangzhou Metro Corporation
- Line: Line 16
- Platforms: 2 (1 island platform)

History
- Opened: April 23, 2020

Services
Preceding station	Hangzhou Metro	Following station
Lin'an Square towards Jiuzhou Street	Line 16	Qingshanhu towards Lvting Road
Location

Zhejiang A&F University Station (Chinese: 农林大学站) is a metro station on Line 16 of the Hangzhou Metro in China. It is located in the Lin'an District of Hangzhou and it serves the nearby Zhejiang A & F University.

== Station Layout ==
1F	Ground	Entrances and Exits
-1F	Concourse	Faregates, Station Agent
-2F		← Line 16 towards Jiuzhou Street (Lin'an Square)
-2F	Island platform, doors open on the left
-2F		Line 16 towards Lvting Road (Qingshanhu) →
