= Nanhu station =

Nanhu station may refer to:

- Nanhu station (Chongqing Rail Transit), a metro station on the Loop line, Chongqing, China
- Nanhu station (Hangzhou Metro), a metro station on Line 16, Hangzhou, Zhejiang, China
- Nanhu station (Nanning Metro), a metro station on Line 1, Nanning, Guangxi, China
- Nanhu station (Nanjing Metro), a metro station on Line 7, Nanjing, Jiangsu, China
