= Yuhang Road station =

Metro station in China

Yuhang Road 禹航路
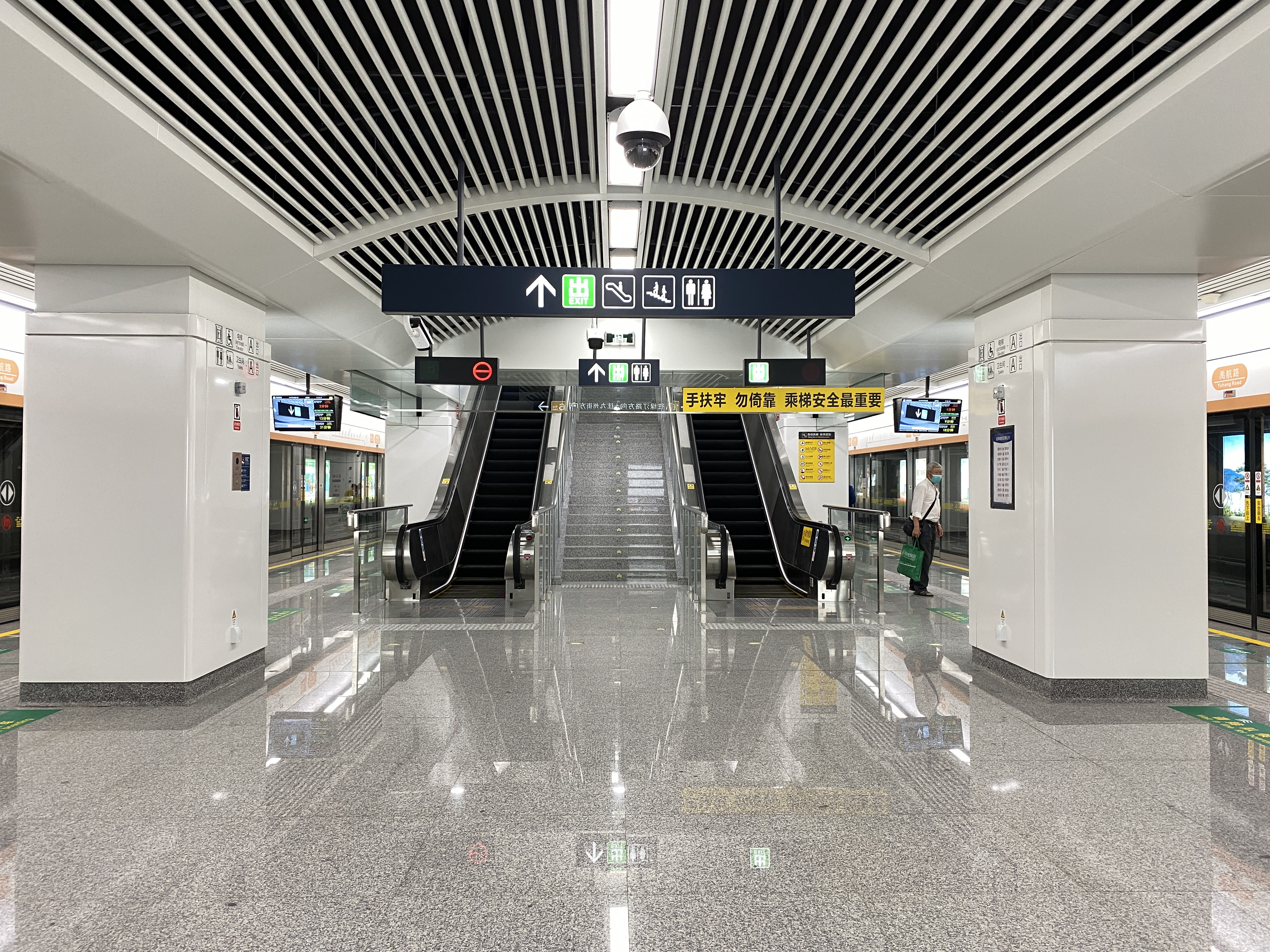

General information
- Location: Yuhang District, Hangzhou, Zhejiang; China
- Coordinates: 30.25168°N 119.95041°E
- Operator: Hangzhou Metro Corporation
- Line: Line 16
- Platforms: 2 (1 island platform)

History
- Opened: April 23, 2020

Services
Preceding station	Hangzhou Metro	Following station
Zhongtai towards Jiuzhou Street	Line 16	Fengxin Road towards Lvting Road
Location

Yuhang Road (Chinese: 禹航路) is a metro station on Line 16 of the Hangzhou Metro in China. It is located in the Yuhang District of Hangzhou.
