= Nanfeng station (Hangzhou Metro) =

Metro station in China

Nanfeng 南峰
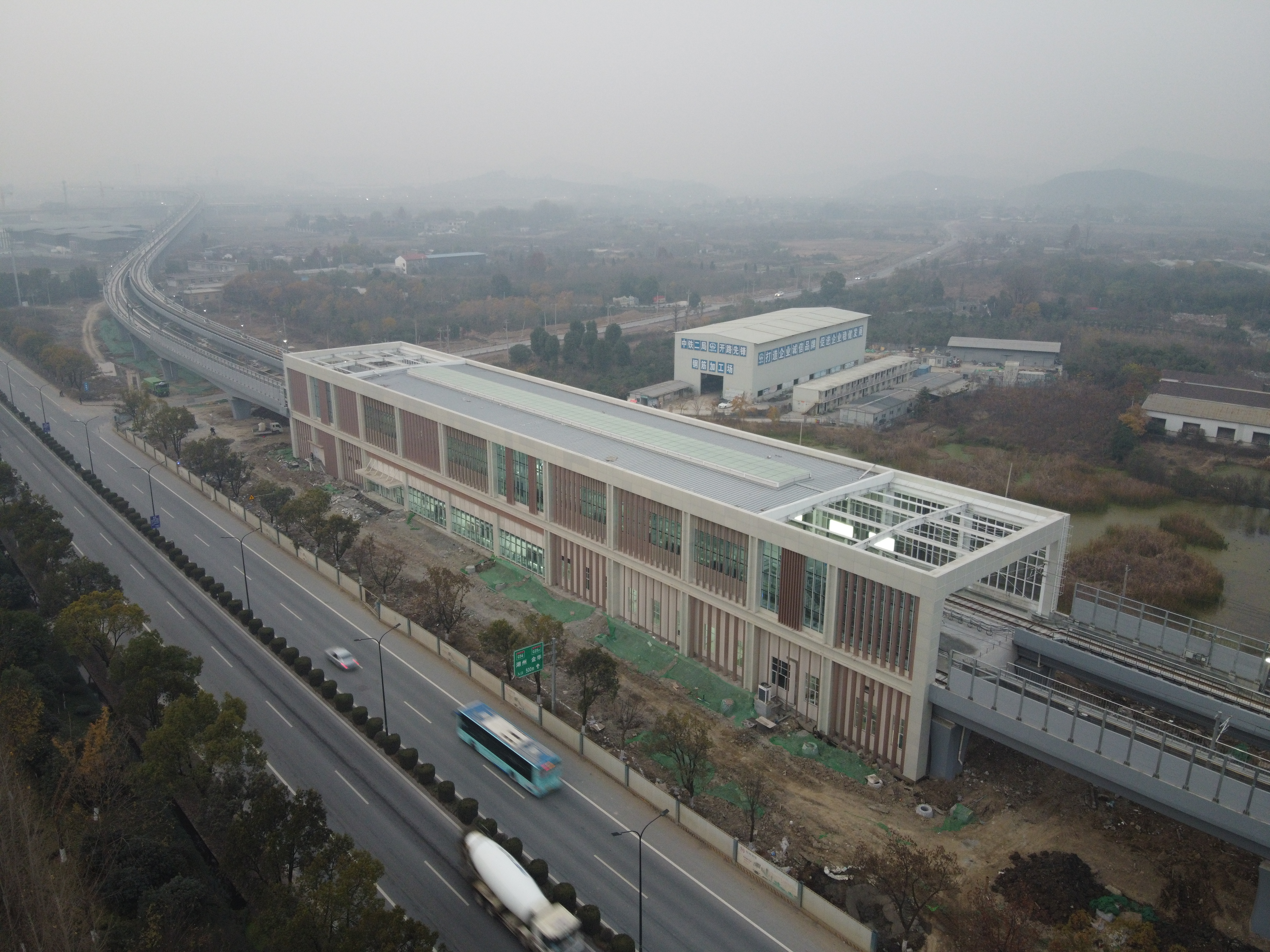

General information
- Location: Yuhang District, Hangzhou, Zhejiang; China
- Coordinates: 30.25237°N 119.873734°E
- Operator: Hangzhou Metro Corporation
- Line: Line 16
- Platforms: 2 (1 island platform)

History
- Opened: April 23, 2020

Services
Preceding station	Hangzhou Metro	Following station
Qingshanhu Sci-tech City towards Jiuzhou Street	Line 16	Nanhu towards Lvting Road
Location

Nanfeng (Chinese: 南峰) is a metro station on Line 16 of the Hangzhou Metro in China. It is located in the Yuhang District of Hangzhou.
