= Lin'an Square station =

Metro station in China

Lin'an Square 临安广场
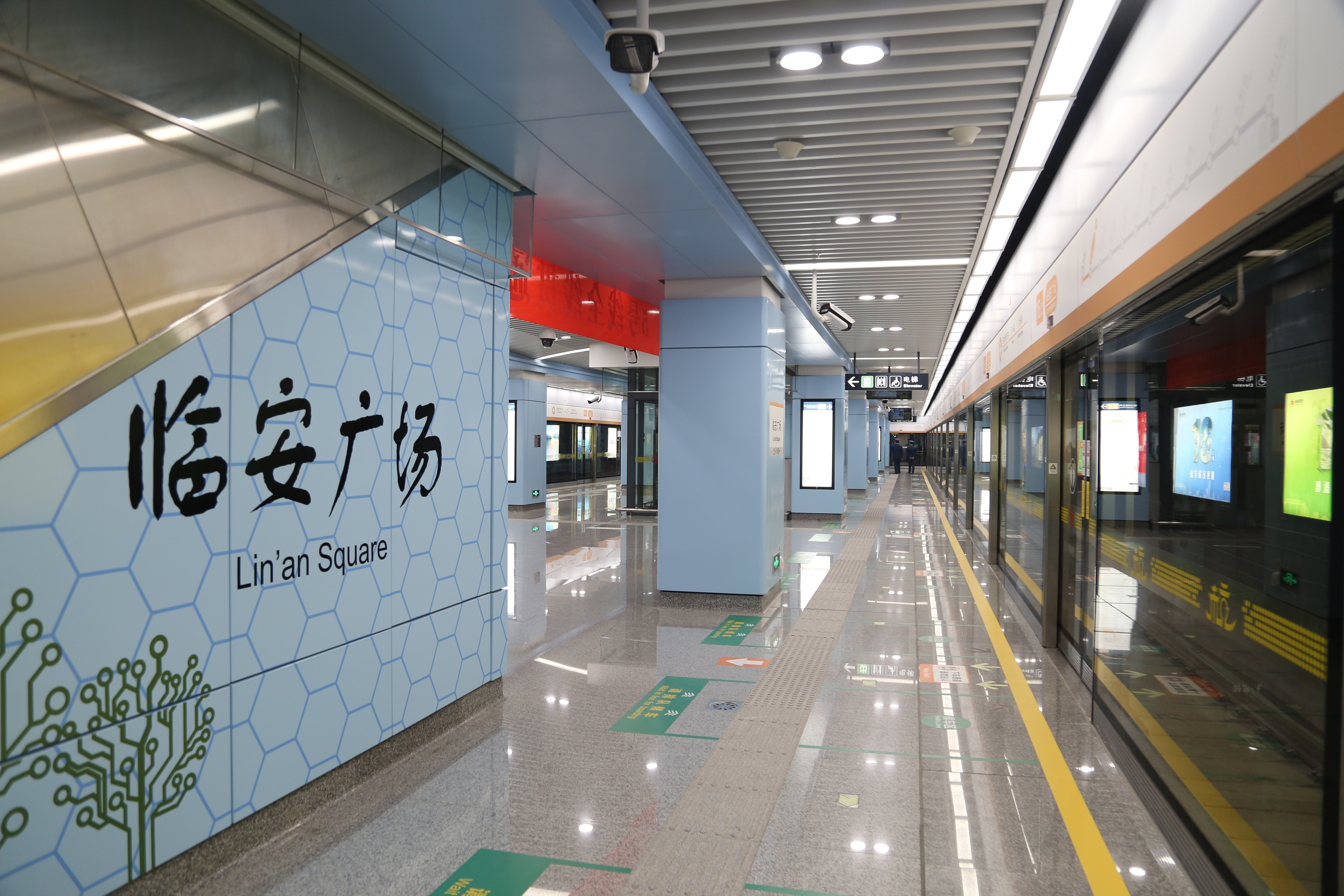

General information
- Location: Lin'an District, Hangzhou, Zhejiang; China
- Coordinates: 30.23021°N 119.701511°E
- Operator: Hangzhou Metro Corporation
- Line: Line 16
- Platforms: 2 (1 island platform)

History
- Opened: April 23, 2020

Services
Preceding station	Hangzhou Metro	Following station
Jiuzhou Street Terminus	Line 16	Zhejiang A&F University towards Lvting Road
Location

Lin'an Square (Chinese: 临安广场) is a metro station on Line 16 of the Hangzhou Metro in China. It is located in the Lin'an District of Hangzhou.
