= Chuangming Road station =

Metro station in Hangzhou, China

Chuangming Road 创明路

General information
- Location: Juncai Street (俊采街) × Chuangming Road/Chuangjing Road (创景路) (All roads are under construction); Yuhang District, Hangzhou, Zhejiang; China
- Coordinates: 30°15′47″N 119°59′51″E
- Operated by: Hangzhou Metro Corporation
- Line: Line 3
- Platforms: 2 (1 island platform)

Services
Preceding station	Hangzhou Metro	Following station
Lvting Road towards Wushanqiancun	Line 3	Quanfeng towards Xingqiao
Location

Chuangming Road (Chinese: 创明路) is a metro station of Line 3 of the Hangzhou Metro in China. It is located in Yuhang District of Hangzhou. Because of lacking external links, it is not in service right now.
