= Fengxin Road station =

Metro station in China

Fengxin Road 凤新路
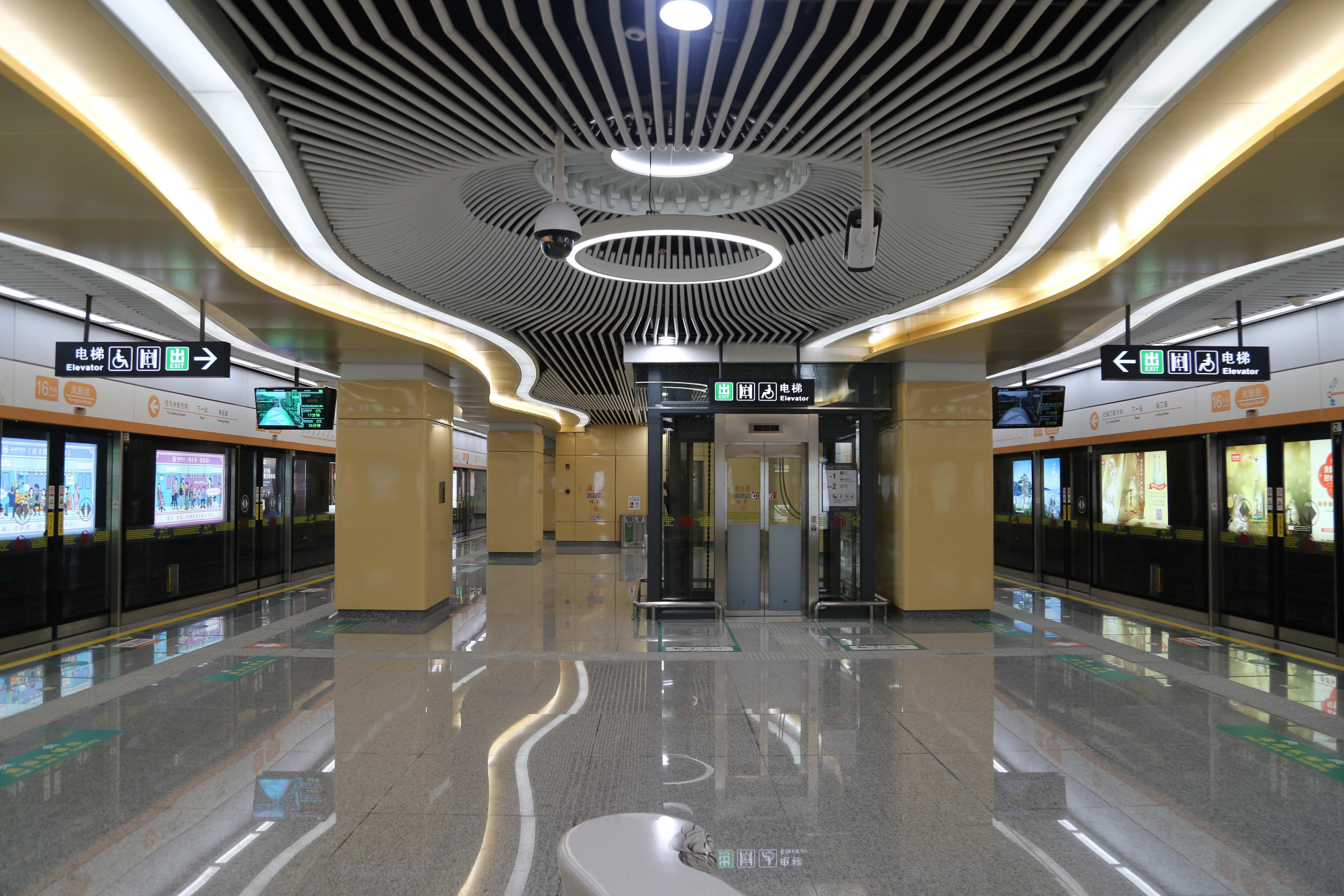

General information
- Location: Yuhang District, Hangzhou, Zhejiang; China
- Coordinates: 30.26259°N 119.96438°E
- Operator: Hangzhou Metro Corporation
- Line: Line 16
- Platforms: 2 (1 island platform)

History
- Opened: April 23, 2020

Services
Preceding station	Hangzhou Metro	Following station
Yuhang Road towards Jiuzhou Street	Line 16	Lvting Road Terminus
Location

Fengxin Road (Chinese: 凤新路) is a metro station on Line 16 of the Hangzhou Metro in China. It is located in the Yuhang District of Hangzhou.
