= Linan High School =

School in Hangzhou, Zhejiang, China

Lin'an High School (临安中学) is a secondary school in Jincheng Subdistrict (锦城街道), Lin'an District, Hangzhou, Zhejiang province, China.
