= Nanhu station (Hangzhou Metro) =

Metro station in China

Nanhu 南湖
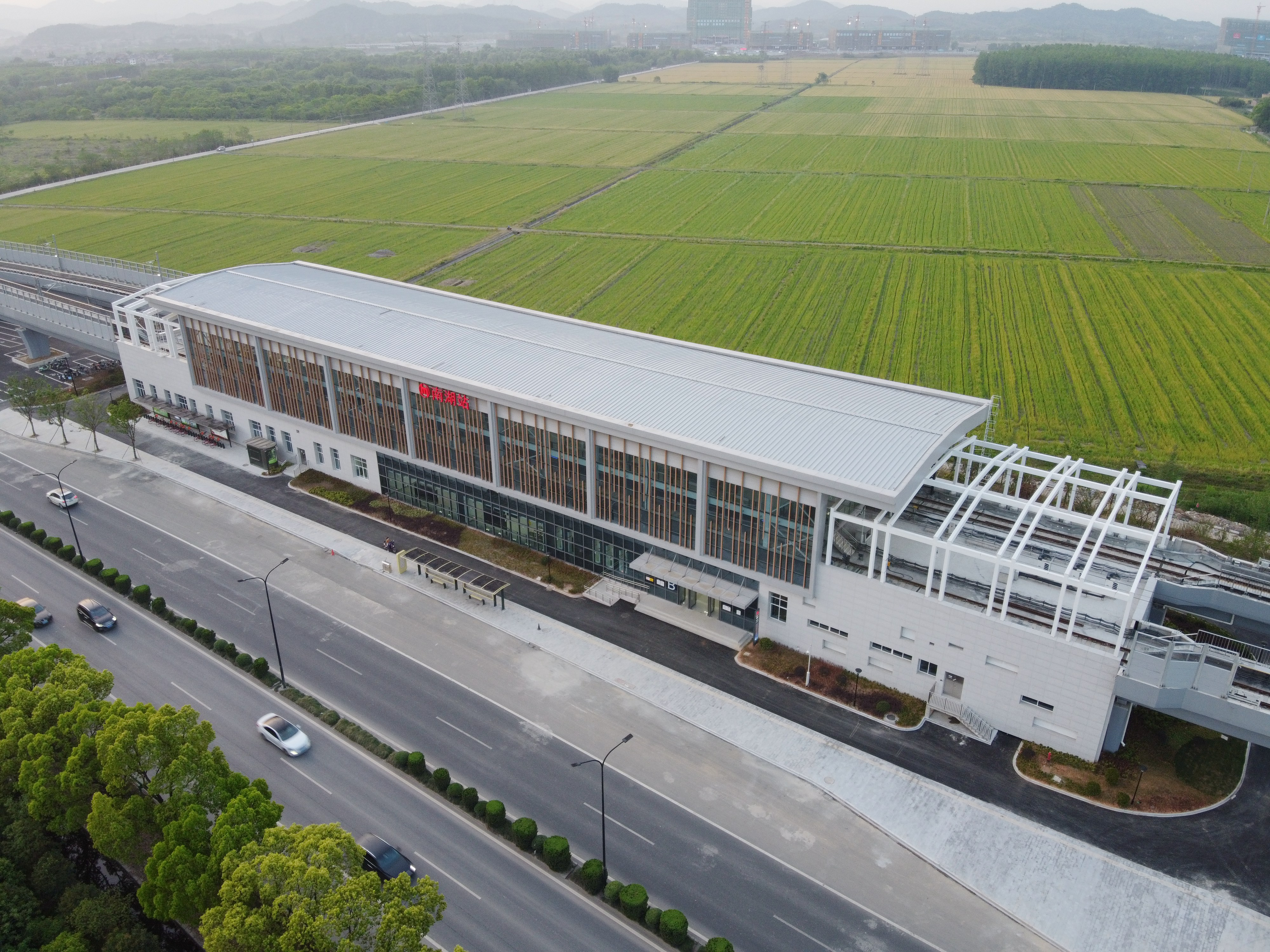

General information
- Location: Yuhang District, Hangzhou, Zhejiang; China
- Coordinates: 30.2494°N 119.89508°E
- Operator: Hangzhou Metro Corporation
- Line: Line 16
- Platforms: 2 (1 island platform)

History
- Opened: April 23, 2020

Services
| Preceding station | Hangzhou Metro | Following station |
|---|---|---|
| Nanfeng towards Jiuzhou Street | Line 16 | Zhongtai towards Lvting Road |
Location

Nanhu (Chinese: 南湖) is a metro station on Line 16 of the Hangzhou Metro in China. It is located in the Yuhang District of Hangzhou.
