= Wulian station =

Metro station in Hangzhou, China

Wulian 五联
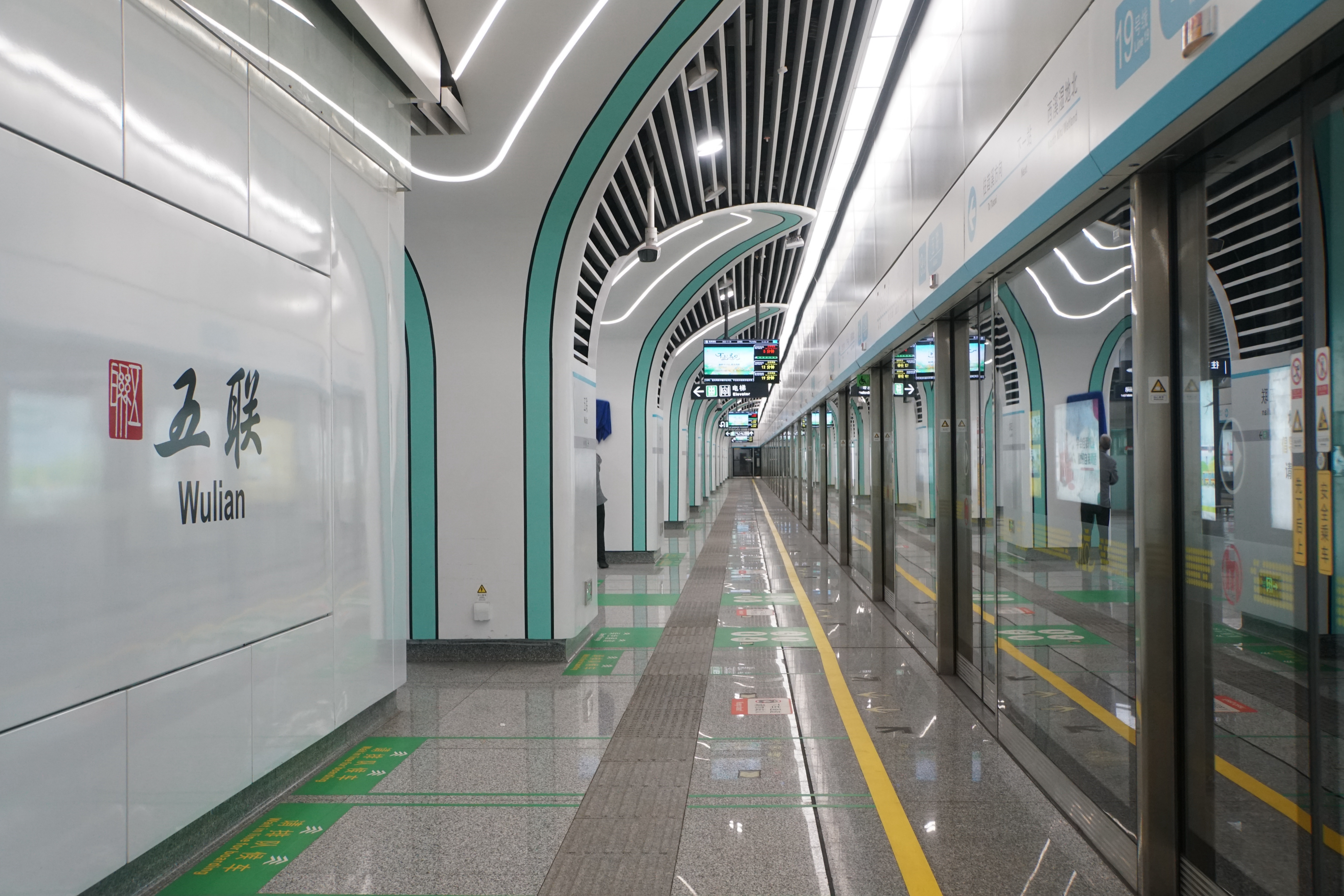
- Platform

General information
- Location: Wensan Road (W) (文三西路) × Gudun Road (古墩路); Xihu District, Hangzhou, Zhejiang; China
- Coordinates: 30°16′41″N 120°05′40″E
- Operated by: Hangzhou Metro Corporation
- Line: Line 19
- Platforms: 2 (1 island platform)

Construction
- Structure type: Underground
- Accessible: Yes

History
- Opened: 30 November 2023

Services
Preceding station	Hangzhou Metro	Following station
North Xixi Wetland towards Tiaoxi	Line 19	Wensan Road towards Yongsheng Road
Location

Wulian (simplified Chinese: 五联; traditional Chinese: 五聯) is a metro station of Line 19 of the Hangzhou Metro in China. It is located in Xihu District of Hangzhou. The station was opened on 30 November 2023.

== Station layout ==
Wulian has two levels: a concourse, and an island platform with two tracks for line 19.

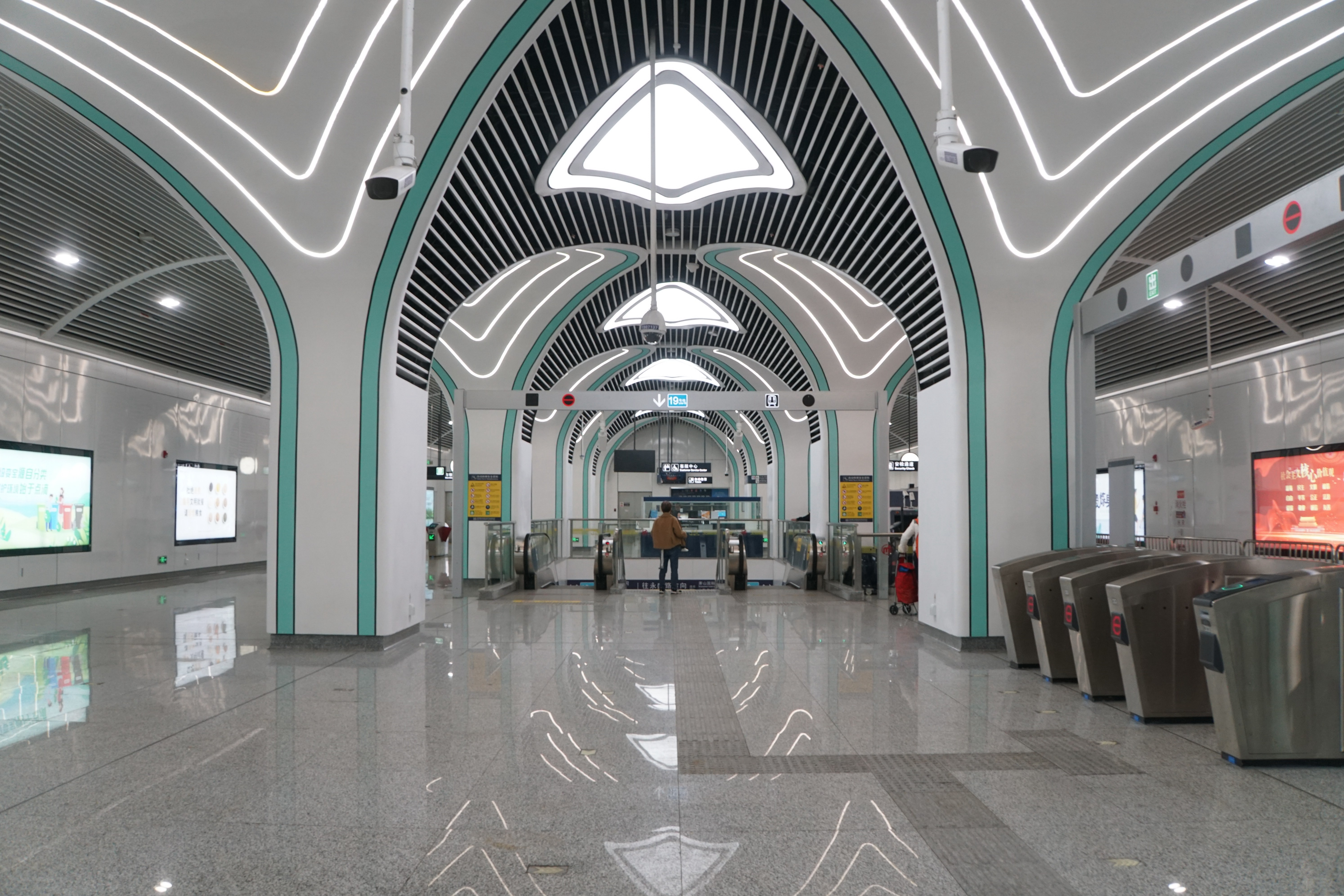
Concourse

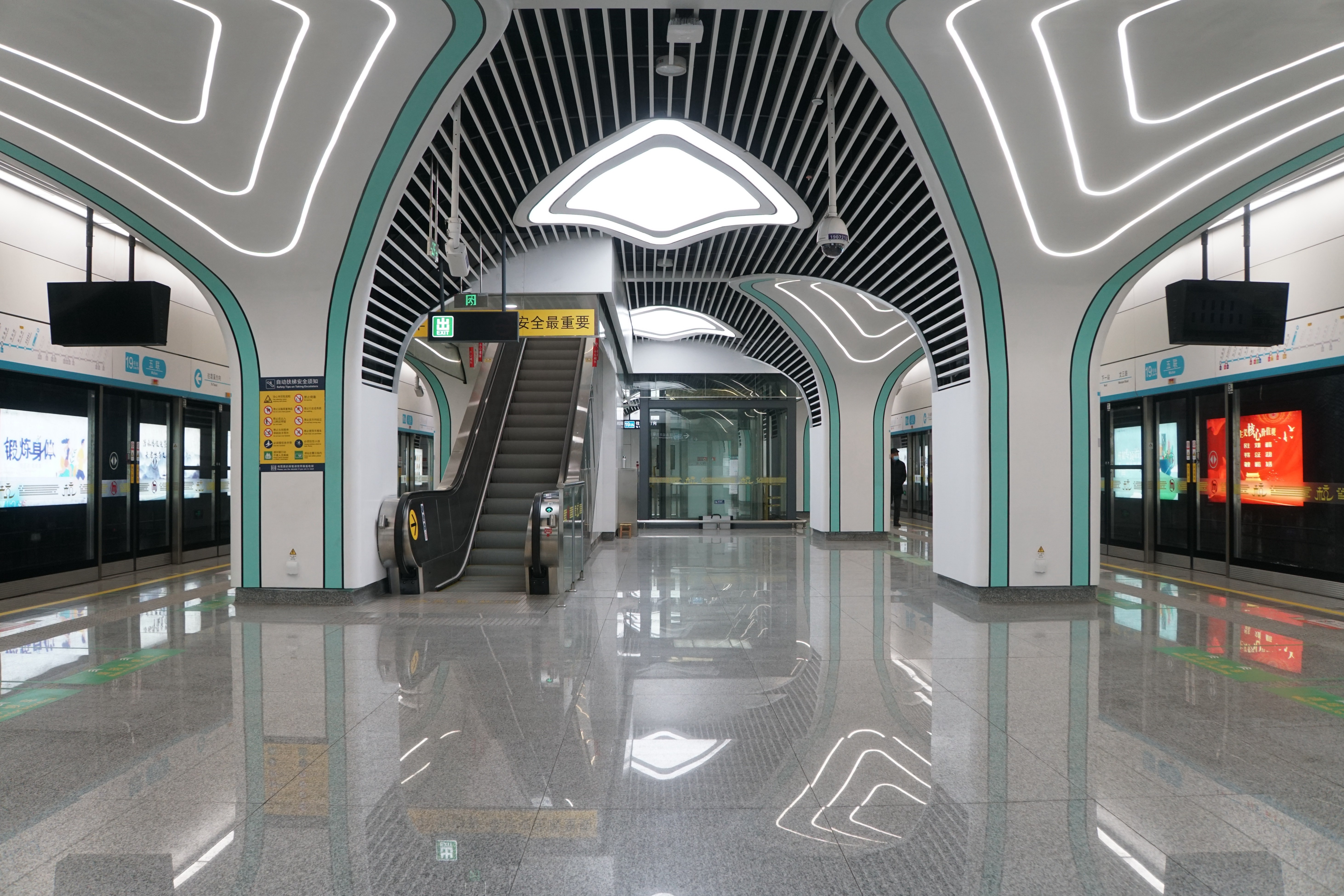
Platform

=== Entrances/exits ===
- C: north side of Wensan Road (W), Xicheng Road (西城路)
- D: south side of Wensan Road (W)
- E: south side of Wensan Road (W), Gudun Road
