= Jianqiao Old Street station =

Metro station in Hangzhou, China

Jianqiao Old Street 笕桥老街
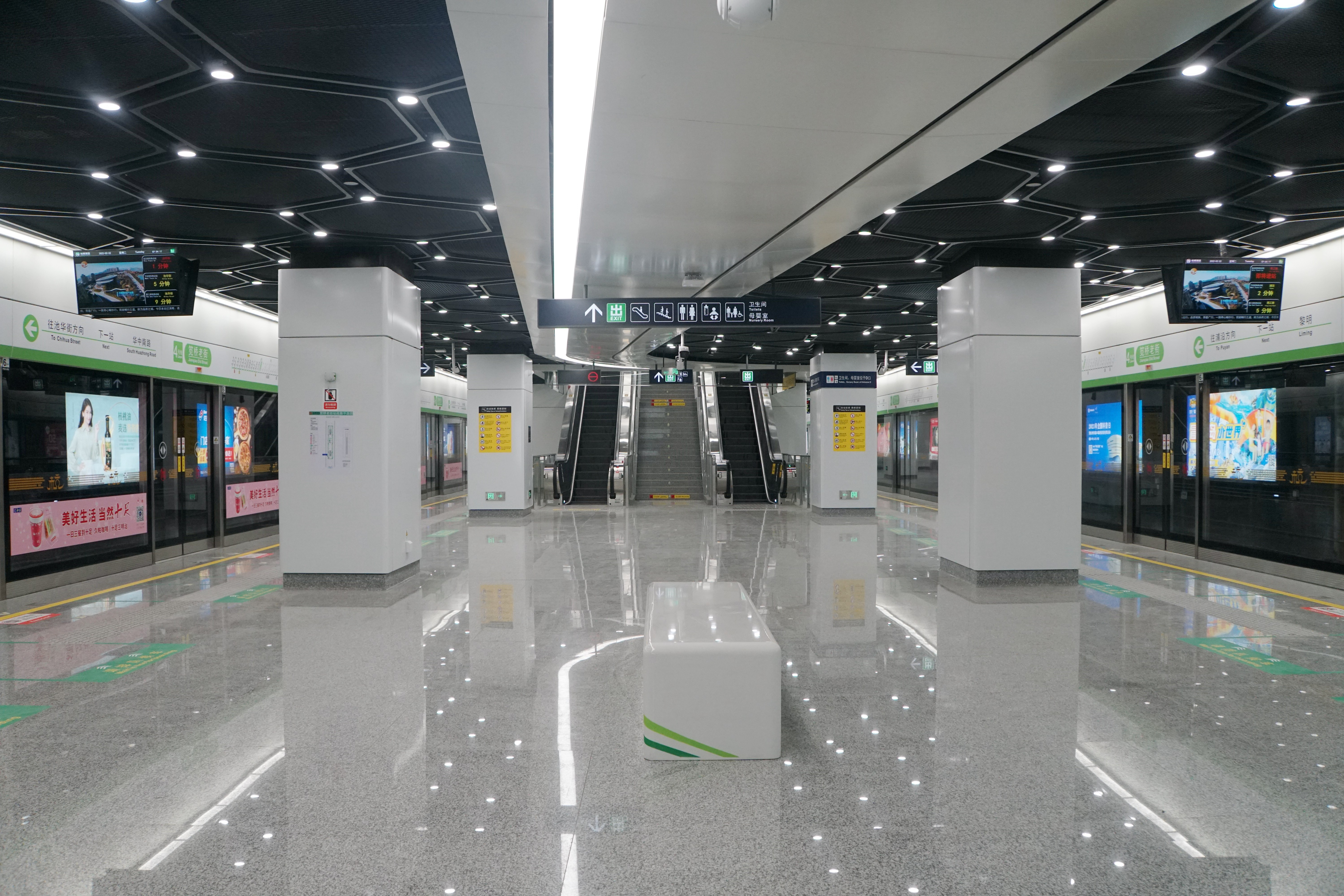
- platform

General information
- Location: Jichang Road; Shangcheng District, Hangzhou, Zhejiang; China
- Operated by: Hangzhou Metro Corporation
- Line: Line 4
- Platforms: 2 (1 island platform)

History
- Opened: 21 February 2022

Services
Preceding station	Hangzhou Metro	Following station
Liming towards Puyan	Line 4	South Huazhong Road towards Chihua Street
Location

Jianqiao Old Street (Chinese: 笕桥老街) is a metro station of Line 4 of the Hangzhou Metro in China. It is located in Shangcheng District of Hangzhou. The station was opened on 21 February 2022.

== Design ==
The station's interior design is themed "Soaring Eagle in Action" (Chinese: “飞鹰出击”), drawing inspiration from the shapes of aircraft fuselages and wings. Curved lines representing flight paths are integrated throughout the station's space, extending from the ceiling to the walls and floors, creating a cohesive artistic spatial effect.

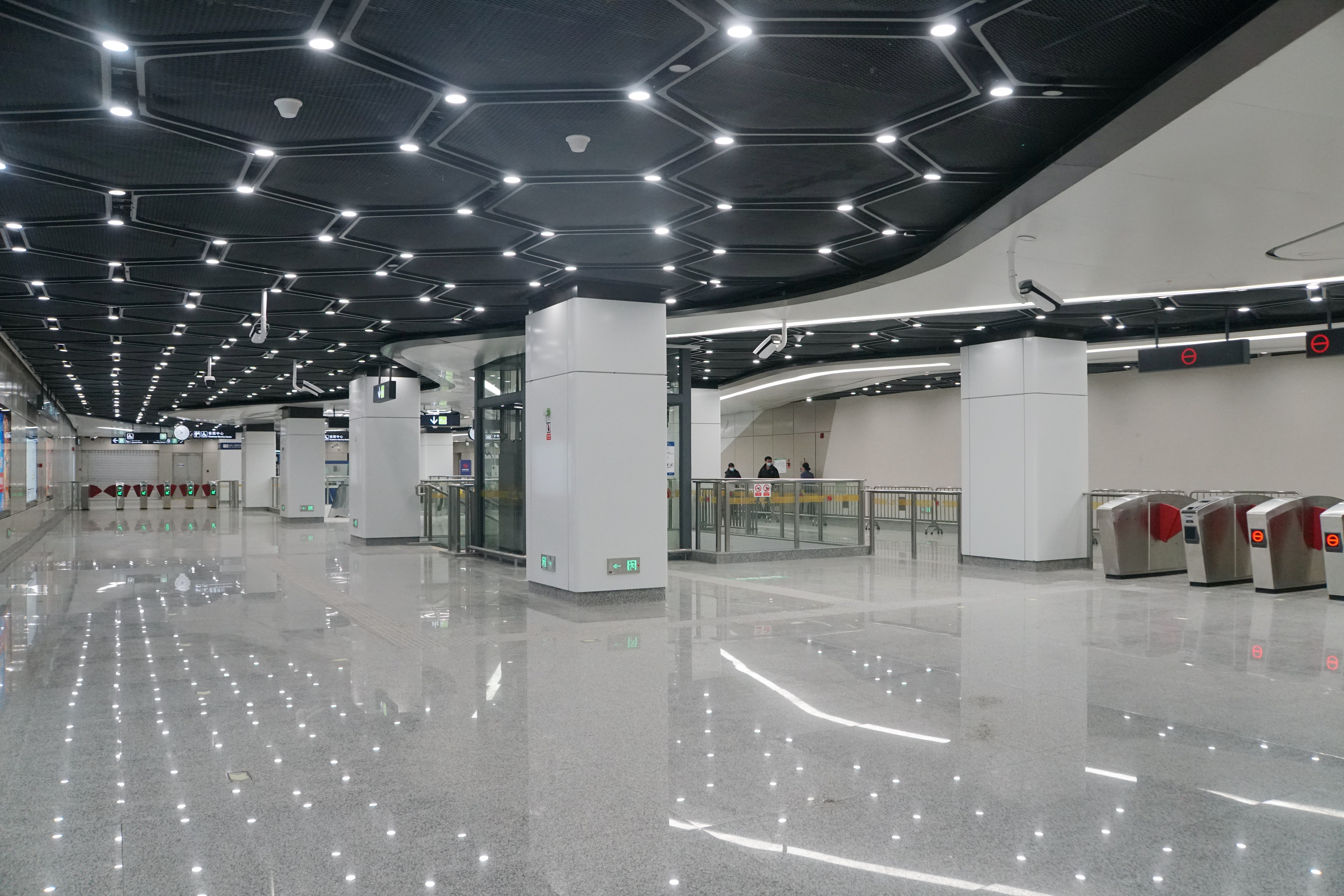
Concourse

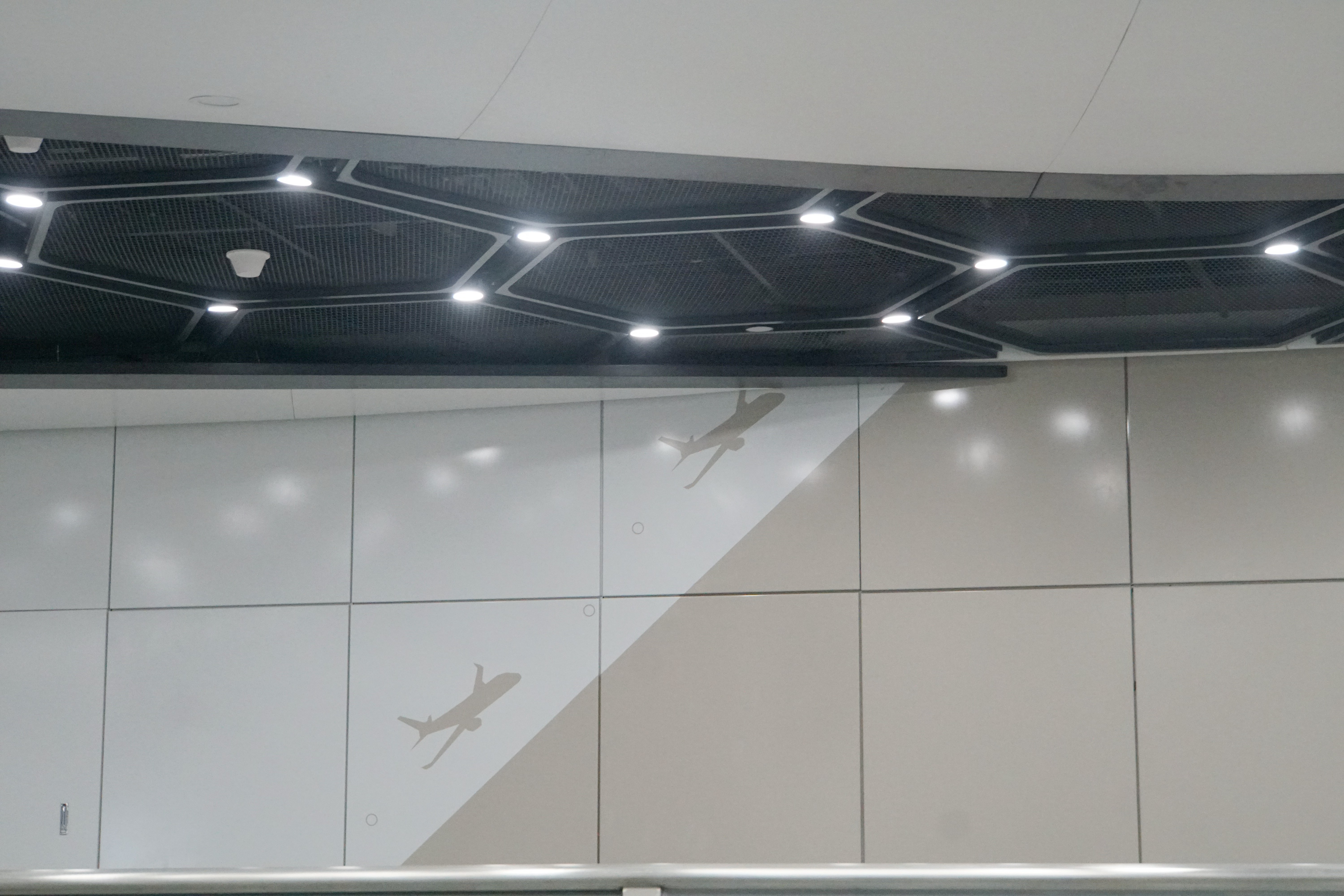
Drawing of plane in the concourse

== Entrances/exits ==
There are 4 exits.

- A: Dinglan Rd., Jianding Rd.
- B: Jianding Rd.
- C: Jianshi Rd.
- D: Dinglan Rd., Jianqiao Rd.
