= Gexiang station =

Metro station in Hangzhou, China

Gexiang 葛巷
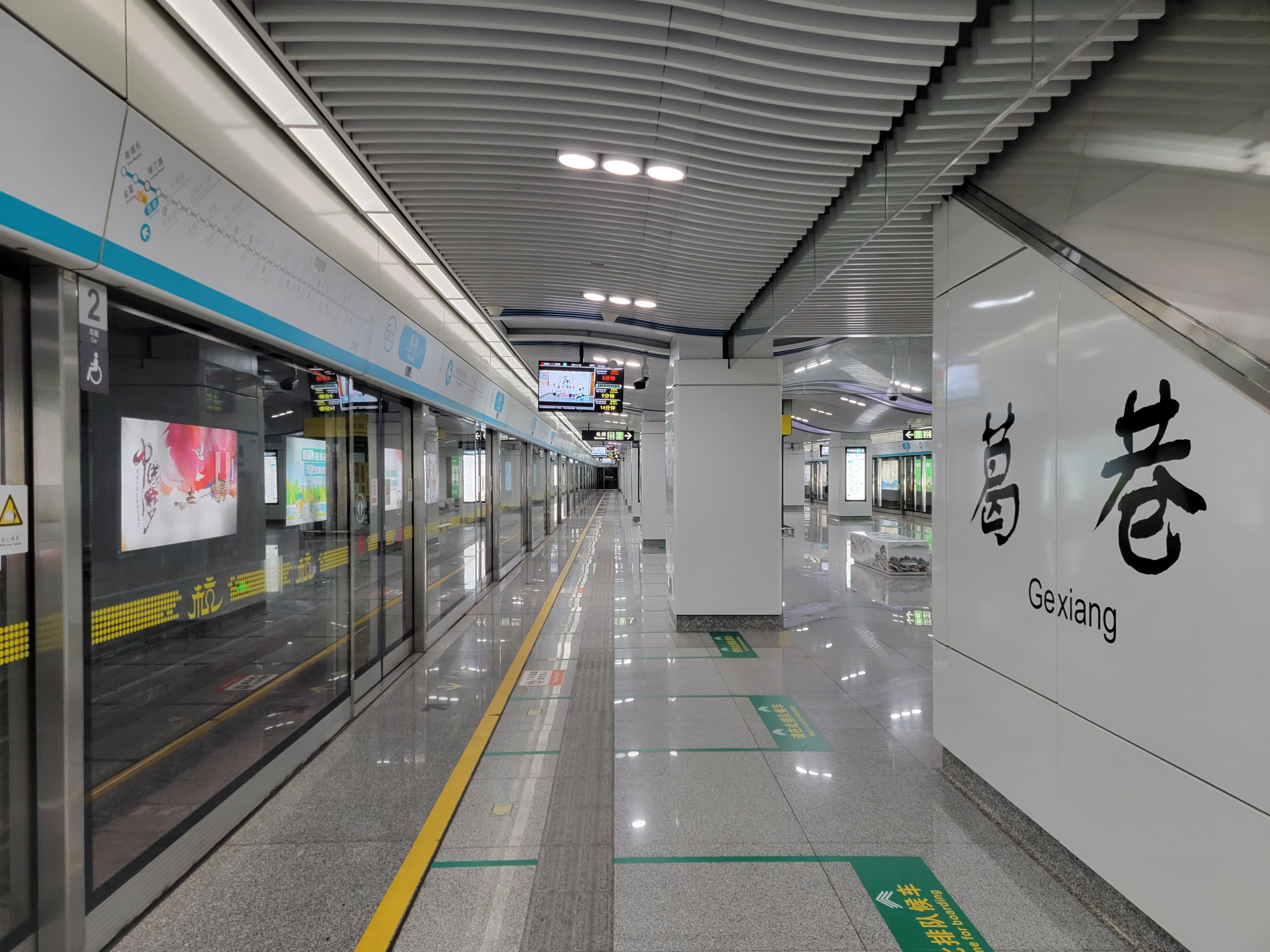
- Platform

General information
- Location: Chuangjing Road × Aicheng Street; Yuhang District, Hangzhou, Zhejiang; China
- Coordinates: 30°16′21″N 119°59′39″E
- Operator: Hangzhou MTR Line 5 Corporation
- Line: Line 5
- Platforms: 2 (1 island platform)

Construction
- Structure type: Underground
- Accessible: Yes

History
- Opened: April 23, 2020

Services
Preceding station	Hangzhou Metro	Following station
Lvting Road towards East Nanhu	Line 5	Chuangjing Road towards Guniangqiao
Location

Gexiang (Chinese: 葛巷) is a metro station on Line 5 of the Hangzhou Metro in China. It is located in the Yuhang District of Hangzhou, the capital city of Zhejiang Province.

== Station layout ==
Gexiang has two levels: a concourse, and an island platform with two tracks for line 5.

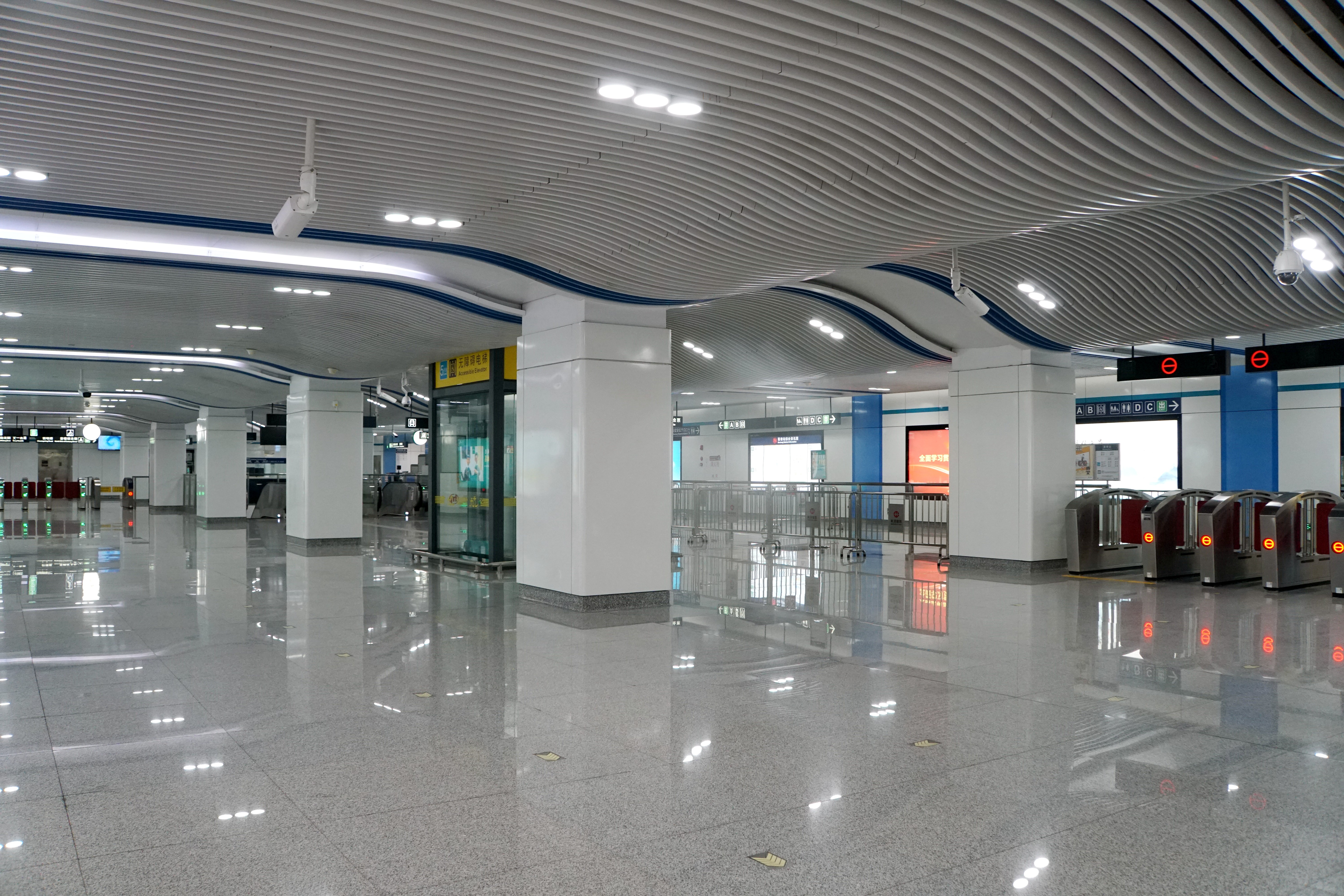
Concourse

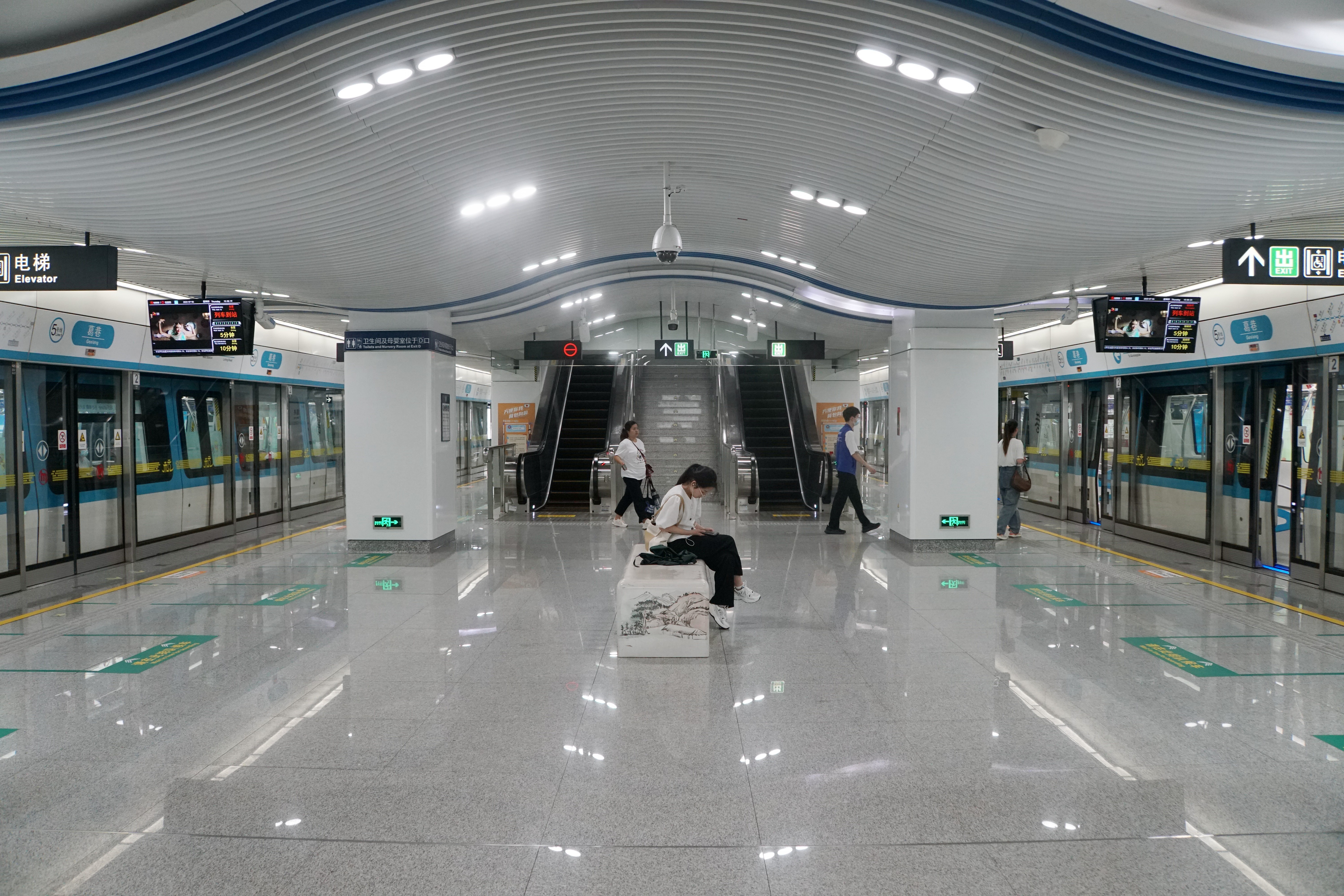
Platform

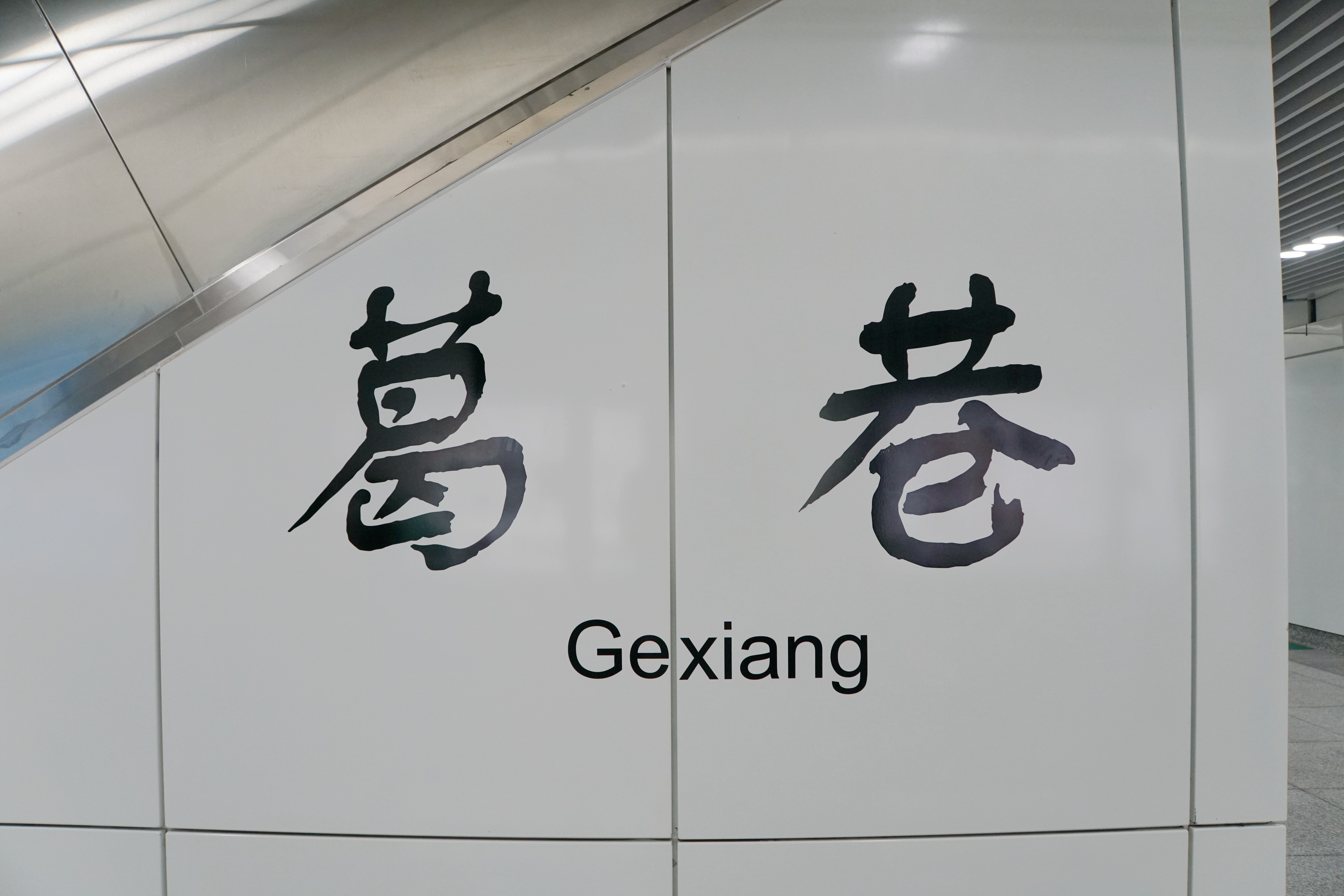
Station name in Chinese calligraphy

=== Entrances/exits ===
- A: north side of Aicheng Street, Chuangming Road
- B: north side of Aicheng Street, Wenyi Road (W)
- C: south side of Aicheng Street, Sikai Road
- D: south side of Aicheng Street, Sikai Road
