= Line 16 (Hangzhou Metro) =

Metro line of the Hangzhou Metro system in China

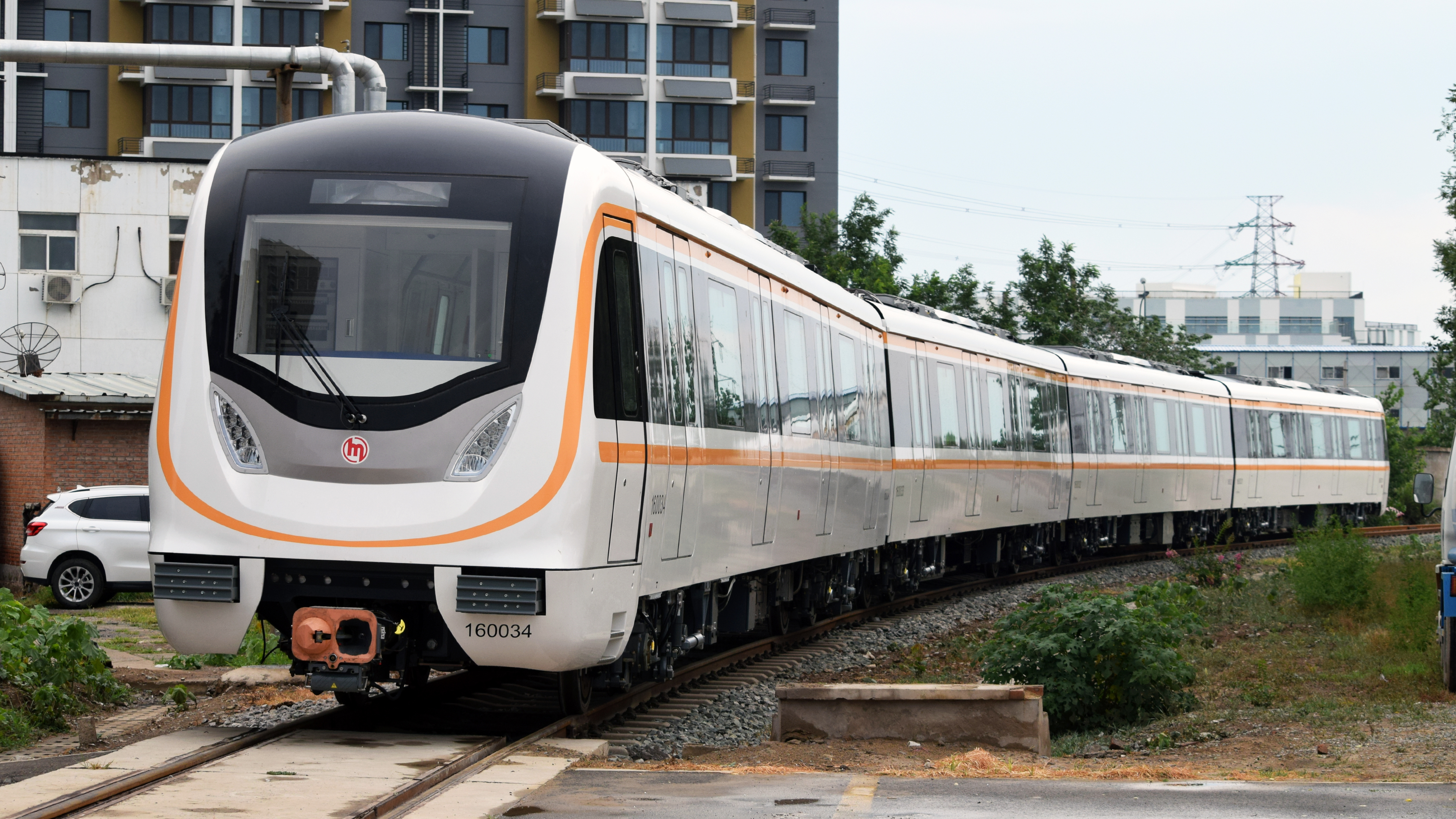
- Line 16 train

Overview
- Other name: Hangzhou–Lin'an intercity railway (杭州至临安城际铁路)
- Status: Operational
- Owner: City of Hangzhou
- Locale: Hangzhou, Zhejiang, China
- Termini: Jiuzhou Street; Lvting Road
- Stations: 12

Service
- Type: Rapid transit
- System: Hangzhou Metro
- Operator(s): Hangzhou Metro Corporation
- Depot(s): Shangquan Vehicle Base
- Rolling stock: PM133

History
- Opened: April 23, 2020; 6 years ago

Technical
- Line length: 35.12 km (21.82 mi)
- Number of tracks: 2
- Character: Underground and Elevated
- Track gauge: 1,435 mm (4 ft 8 1/2 in)
- Electrification: Overhead, 1500 V DC
- Operating speed: 120 km/h (75 mph)
- Signalling: Thales SEC Transport SelTrac CBTC

Line 16 of the Hangzhou Metro (Chinese: 杭州地铁16号线; pinyin: Hángzhōu Dìtiě shíliù hào xiàn) is a metro line running east–west from Lvting Road in Yuhang District to Jiuzhou Street in Lin'an District. The total length is 35.12 km (21.82 mi). The line is colored light orange on system maps. The line began construction in early 2016 and opened on 23 April 2020.

== Route overview ==
This line has a total length of about 35.12 km and a total of 12 stations. The average distance between stations is about 3.13 km, including 8 underground stations and 4 elevated stations. Each station usually with one staff on the platform and 4 staff on concourse for security check, two per entrance. Elevated section starts from around 500m before Nanhu, and ends at halfway after Babaili. All stations in elevated section are equipped with 2 air-conditioned waiting rooms. All washroom are outside the gates, except Lvting Road. The length of the line is 20.7 km in Lin'an District, with 6 stations (4 underground stations); in Yuhang District, the length is 14.3 km, with 6 stations (4 underground stations). The maximum operating speed of the line design is 120 km/h (75 mph), acceleration process takes around 600m to complete, and the average operating speed is 60 km/h (37 mph), about 38 minutes one way. The line trains are powered by 4 B-type cars and a 1500 V DC overhead catenary. A comprehensive vehicle base is set up in Xiaquan Village, Lin'an District, and the control center is located in the control center of Hangzhou Metro. The project uses a 35kV decentralized power supply scheme.

== Opening timeline ==
Segment	Commencement	Length	Station(s)	Name
Lvting Road — Jiuzhou Street	23 April 2020	34.41 km (21.38 mi)	12	Phase 1

== Stations ==

Station name		Connections	Distance km		Location
English	Chinese	Connections	Distance km		Location
Jiuzhou Street	九州街		0.00	0.00	Lin'an
Lin'an Square	临安广场		3.68	3.68	Lin'an
Zhejiang A&F University	农林大学		4.09	7.77	Lin'an
Qingshanhu	青山湖		1.98	9.75	Lin'an
Babaili	八百里		2.42	12.17	Lin'an
Qingshanhu Sci-tech City	青山湖科技城		4.59	16.76	Lin'an
Nanfeng	南峰		5.37	22.13	Yuhang
Nanhu	南湖		2.08	24.21	Yuhang
Zhongtai	中泰		3.06	27.27	Yuhang
Yuhang Road	禹航路		2.62	29.89	Yuhang
Fengxin Road	凤新路		2.17	32.06	Yuhang
Lvting Road	绿汀路	3 5	2.35	34.41	Yuhang

== Rolling stock ==
Stock	Class	Year built	Builder	Number built	Numbers	Formation	Depots	Line assigned	Notes
PM170	B	2019-2020	CRRC Nanjing Puzhen	84 (21 sets)	16 001 - 16 021 (160011-160214)	TMc+Mp+Mp+TMc	Shangquan Depot	16	

== See also ==
- Hangzhou Metro
