= Quanfeng station =

Metro station in Hangzhou, China

Quanfeng 全丰
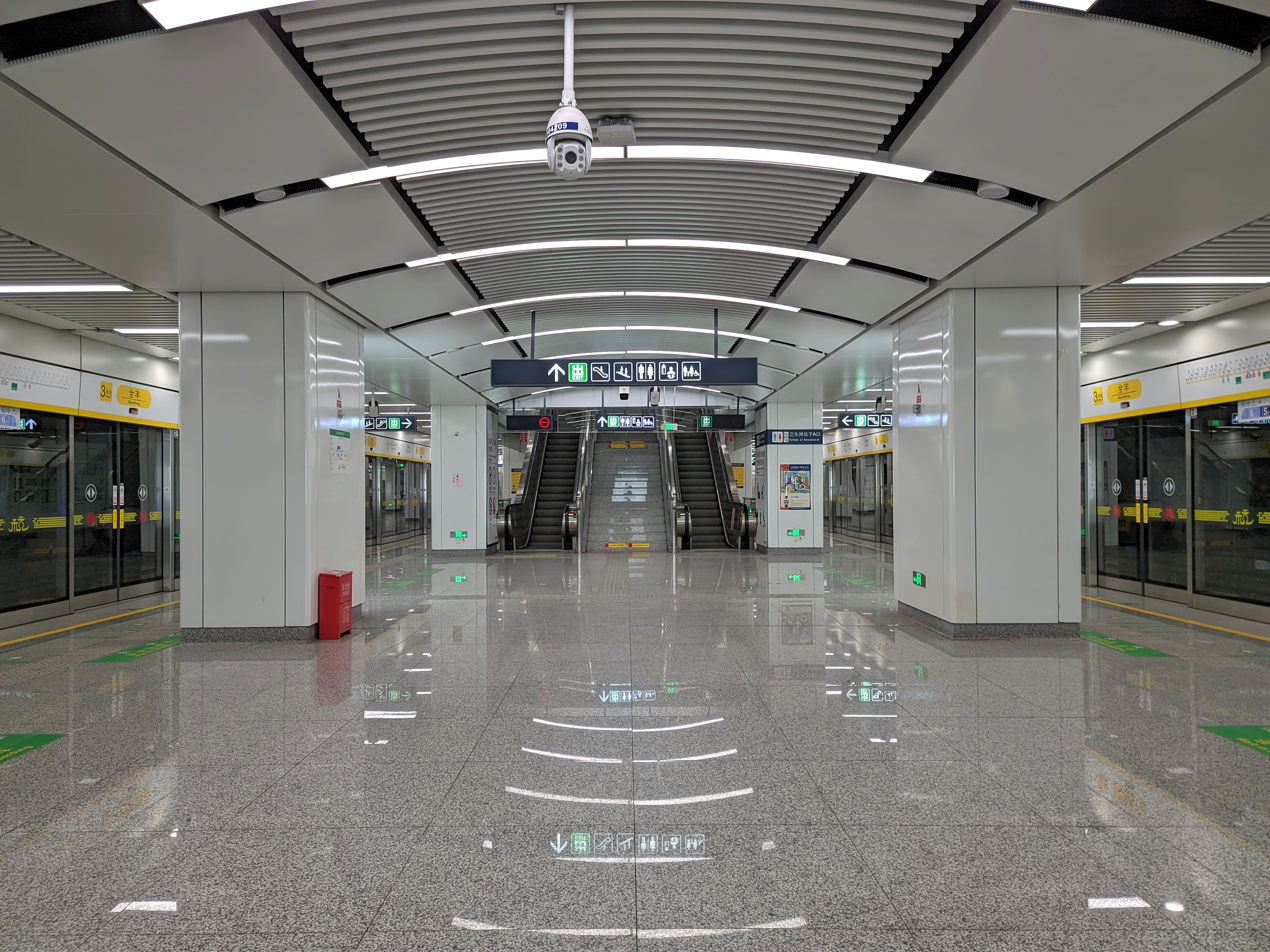

General information
- Location: Yuhang District, Hangzhou, Zhejiang; China
- Coordinates: 30°14′58″N 120°00′12″E
- Operated by: Hangzhou Metro Corporation
- Line: Line 3
- Platforms: 2 (1 island platform)

History
- Opened: 10 June 2022

Services
Preceding station	Hangzhou Metro	Following station
Chuangming Road towards Wushanqiancun	Line 3	Gaojiao Road towards Xingqiao
Location

Quanfeng (Chinese: 全丰) is a metro station of Line 3 of the Hangzhou Metro in China. It is located in Yuhang District of Hangzhou. The station was opened on 10 June 2022.
