= Lin'an, Hangzhou =

Lin'an 临安区 Linan
- District
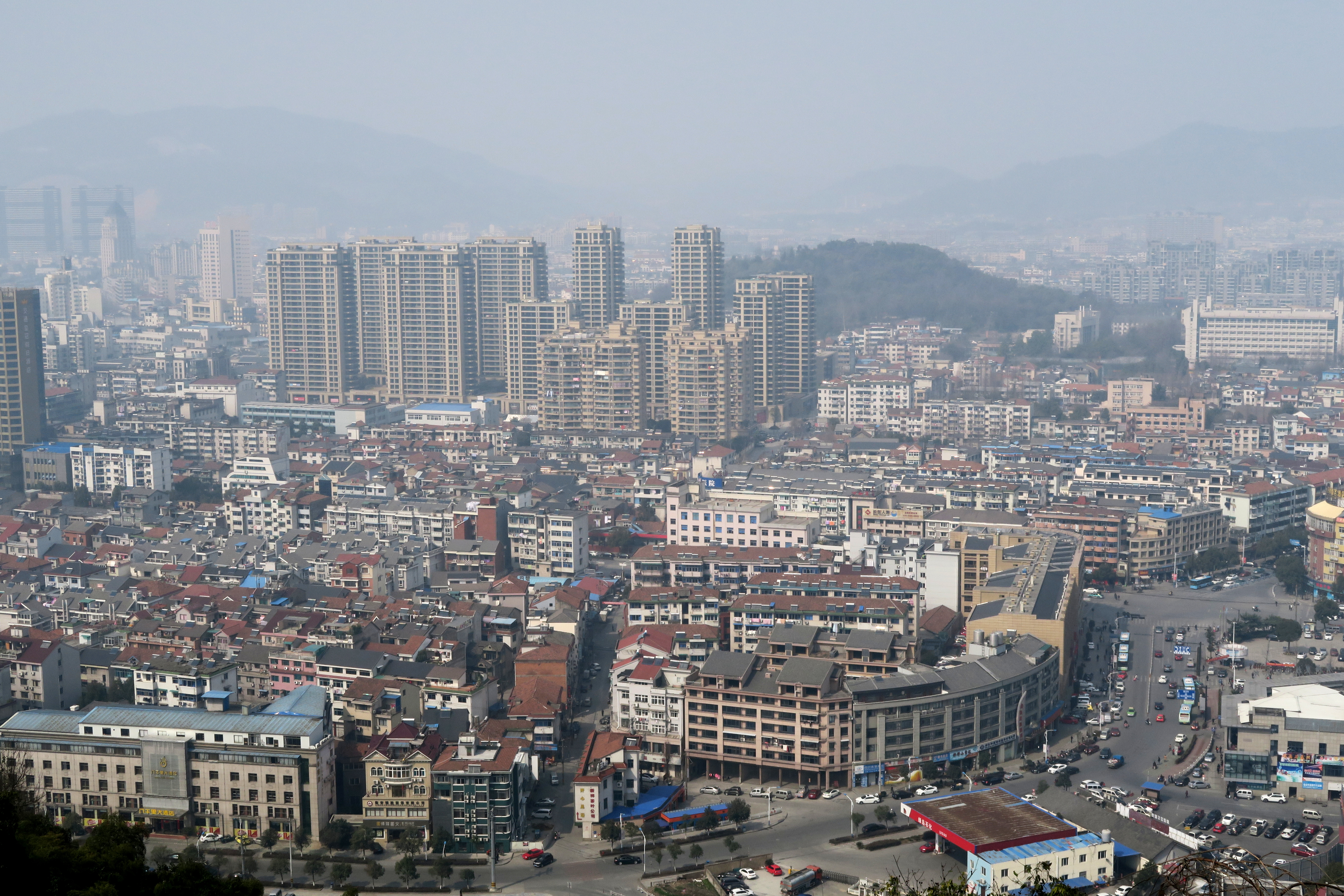

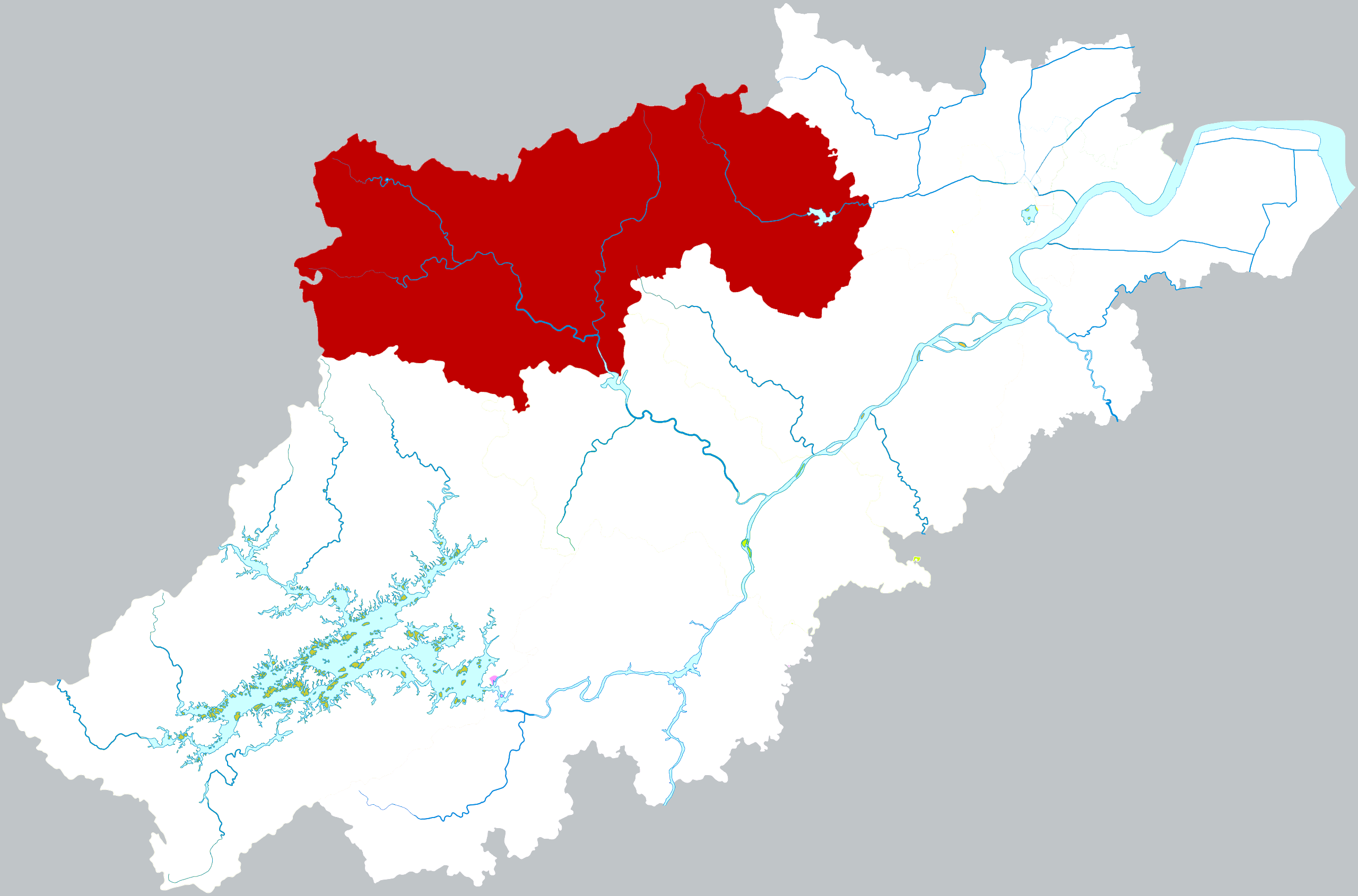
- Location of Lin'an District within Hangzhou

- Location in Zhejiang
- Coordinates: 30°14′10″N 119°42′55″E
- Country: People's Republic of China
- Province: Zhejiang
- Sub-provincial city: Hangzhou

Area
  - Total: 3,118.77 km^{2} (1,204.16 sq mi)
- Time zone: UTC+8 (China Standard)
- Website: www.linan.gov.cn

Lin'an District (Chinese: 临安区) is a suburban district of Hangzhou, Zhejiang, China. It is located in northwest Zhejiang as a separate urban area of Hangzhou, and borders Anhui province to the west and northwest. Lin'an held a population of 573,100 in 2014, over an area of 3,124 km^{2} (1,206 sq mi). The postal code is 311300, and the phone area code 0571.

In May 2015, Lin'an was listed as the Top 100 Economic Potential City/County, ranking 73. Lin'an also voted as No. 16 Innovative County. After the promotion of Fuyang District, Lin'an was converted into the 10th district of Hangzhou in August 2017. The Lin'an government is located at 398 Yijin Street.

Lin'an is rich in natural resources, abundant in rainfall, and has a warm climate. It remains heavily forested, with 71.3% tree cover. Such an ecological environment breeds more than 4,700 biological species. Mountains, lakes, forest, hot springs, caves, and other ancient remains are everywhere. The district's Daming and Tianmu Mountains are well-known attractions, and Gongchen Pagoda and the mausoleums of the Qian dynasty of Wuyue are sites of national historical importance.

== Geography and climate ==
The climate in Lin'an is temperate and humid subtropical monsoon. The annual average temperature is 16.0 °C (60.8 °F) with 1,460 mm (57 in) of precipitation.

Climate data for Lin'an, elevation 118 m (387 ft), (1991–2020 normals, extremes 1981–present)
Month	Jan	Feb	Mar	Apr	May	Jun	Jul	Aug	Sep	Oct	Nov	Dec	Year
Record high °C (°F)	23.8 (74.8)	29.4 (84.9)	34.2 (93.6)	35.9 (96.6)	36.9 (98.4)	39.7 (103.5)	42.1 (107.8)	41.8 (107.2)	40.7 (105.3)	35.1 (95.2)	32.0 (89.6)	25.7 (78.3)	42.1 (107.8)
Mean daily maximum °C (°F)	8.8 (47.8)	11.4 (52.5)	16.2 (61.2)	22.5 (72.5)	27.0 (80.6)	29.2 (84.6)	33.7 (92.7)	33.1 (91.6)	28.3 (82.9)	23.4 (74.1)	17.8 (64.0)	11.6 (52.9)	21.9 (71.5)
Daily mean °C (°F)	4.0 (39.2)	6.2 (43.2)	10.5 (50.9)	16.3 (61.3)	21.2 (70.2)	24.2 (75.6)	28.2 (82.8)	27.6 (81.7)	23.3 (73.9)	17.9 (64.2)	12.2 (54.0)	6.3 (43.3)	16.5 (61.7)
Mean daily minimum °C (°F)	0.6 (33.1)	2.4 (36.3)	6.2 (43.2)	11.5 (52.7)	16.6 (61.9)	20.6 (69.1)	24.1 (75.4)	23.8 (74.8)	19.7 (67.5)	13.8 (56.8)	8.1 (46.6)	2.5 (36.5)	12.5 (54.5)
Record low °C (°F)	−10.5 (13.1)	−8.3 (17.1)	−4.1 (24.6)	−0.9 (30.4)	7.1 (44.8)	11.5 (52.7)	18.4 (65.1)	17.5 (63.5)	8.6 (47.5)	1.5 (34.7)	−4.3 (24.3)	−13.4 (7.9)	−13.4 (7.9)
Average precipitation mm (inches)	84.9 (3.34)	89.0 (3.50)	139.6 (5.50)	126.2 (4.97)	135.4 (5.33)	264.2 (10.40)	194.4 (7.65)	190.8 (7.51)	101.1 (3.98)	63.3 (2.49)	69.9 (2.75)	58.6 (2.31)	1,517.4 (59.73)
Average precipitation days (≥ 0.1 mm)	12.3	11.8	15.0	13.9	14.1	16.2	13.4	14.7	11.8	8.6	10.4	9.7	151.9
Average snowy days	4.3	2.7	0.7	0	0	0	0	0	0	0	0.2	1.5	9.4
Average relative humidity (%)	77	76	74	72	74	81	78	79	80	77	77	74	77
Mean monthly sunshine hours	105.6	103.6	126.3	147.6	160.5	123.7	205.4	190.3	147.1	152.5	128.6	124.6	1,715.8
Percentage possible sunshine	33	33	34	38	38	29	48	47	40	43	41	39	39
Source: China Meteorological Administration

== Administrative divisions ==
Subdistricts:

- Jincheng Subdistrict (锦城街道), Linglong Subdistrict (玲珑街道), Shanggan Subdistrict (上甘街道), Qingshanhu Subdistrict (青山湖街道), Jinbei Subdistrict (锦北街道)

Towns:

- Banqiao (板桥镇), Gaohong (高虹镇), Taihu (太湖镇), Yuqian (於潜镇), Tianmushan (天目山镇), Taiyang (太阳镇), Qianchuan (潜川镇), Changhua (昌化镇), Longgang (龙岗镇), Heqiao (河桥镇), Tuankou (湍口镇), Qingliangfeng (清凉峰镇), Daoshi (岛石镇)

Townships:

- Huanshan Township (环山乡), Huyuan Township (湖源乡), Shangguan Township (上官乡), Yushan Township (渔山乡), Chunjian Township (春建乡), Xintong Township (新桐乡)

== Economy ==
=== Tourism ===
- Daming Mountain
- Tianmu Mountain
- Qingshan Lake

== Education ==
=== Higher education ===
- Zhejiang A&F University

=== Public primary and secondary education ===
- Linan High School
- Yuqian High School
- Changhua High School
- Jincheng NO.1 Middle School
- Jincheng NO.2 Middle School
- Jincheng NO.4 Middle School
- Yijin Elementary School
- Chenxi Elementary School
- Chengbei Elementary School
- Chengnan Elementary School
- Shijing Elementary School

=== Private and alternative education ===
- Hangzhou Tianmu Foreign Language School

== Transport ==
Lin'an is connected to the main urban area of Hangzhou through Line 16 of the Hangzhou Metro and the G56 Hangzhou–Ruili Expressway.

== Notable people ==
- Qian Liu (852-932), known as Qian Poliu during his childhood, was a warlord of the late Tang dynasty who founded the Wuyue kingdom.
- Dong Chang (died 896), warlord who became a short-lived emperor in modern Zhejiang.
- Qian Xuesen, ancestral home in Zhejiang.
