= Jiuzhou Street station =

Metro station in China

Jiuzhou Street 九州街
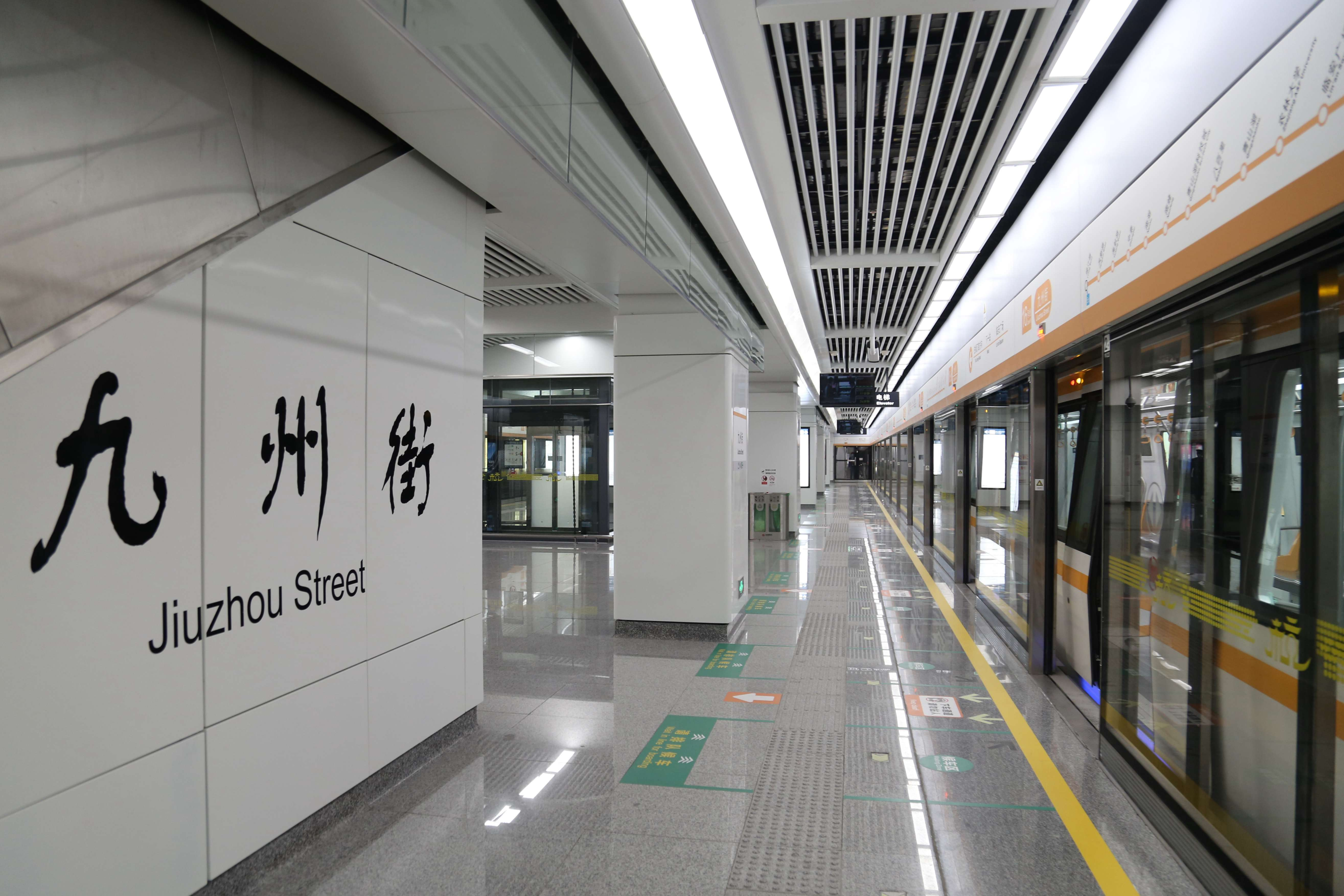

General information
- Location: Lin'an District, Hangzhou, Zhejiang; China
- Coordinates: 30.204562°N 119.691532°E
- Operator: Hangzhou Metro Corporation
- Line: Line 16
- Platforms: 2 (1 island platform)

History
- Opened: April 23, 2020

Services
Preceding station	Hangzhou Metro	Following station
Terminus	Line 16	Lin'an Square towards Lvting Road
Location

Jiuzhou Street (Chinese: 九州街) is a metro station on Line 16 of the Hangzhou Metro in China. It is located in the Lin'an District of Hangzhou and it is the western terminus of Line 16.
