= Lvting Road station =

Metro station in China

Lvting Road 绿汀路
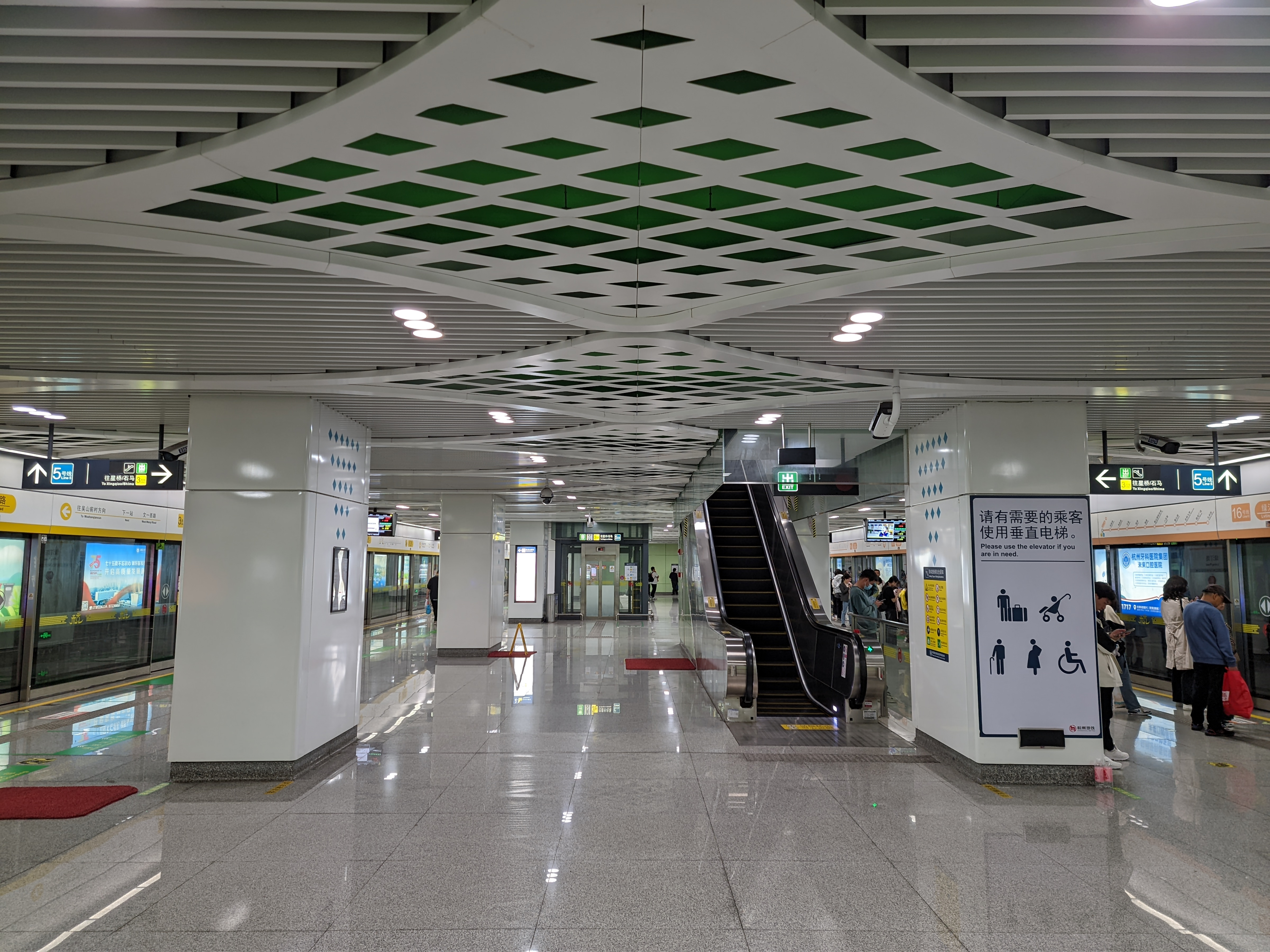

General information
- Location: Yuhang District, Hangzhou, Zhejiang; China
- Coordinates: 30.262544°N 119.986697°E
- Operator: Hangzhou Metro Corporation
- Lines: Line 3 Line 5 Line 16
- Platforms: 6 (3 island platforms)

Construction
- Structure type: Underground

History
- Opened: April 23, 2020 (Line 5 and Line 16); June 10, 2022 (Line 3)

Services
Preceding station	Hangzhou Metro	Following station
West Wenyi Road towards Wushanqiancun	Line 3	Quanfeng towards Xingqiao
Jinxing towards East Nanhu	Line 5	Gexiang towards Guniangqiao
Fengxin Road towards Jiuzhou Street	Line 16	Terminus
Location

Lvting Road (Chinese: 绿汀路), also known as Lüting Road, is an interchange station among Line 3, Line 5 and Line 16 of Hangzhou Metro in China. It is located in Yuhang District, Hangzhou.

== Station structure ==
=== Platform layout ===
There are three island platforms at this station, one for Line 5 on B2 while two for Line 3 and Line 16 on B3. Same-direction cross-platform interchange is provided between Line 3 and Line 16.

Platform on B2

To 5 Jinxing	←	←
	Island platform, doors open on the left
	→	→	To 5 Guniangqiao

Platforms on B3

To 3 Wushanqiancun	←		←
	Doors open on the left
	Doors open on the right
To 16 Jiuzhou Street	←		←
	→	Termination platform	→	To 16 Lvting Road
	Doors open on the right
	Doors open on the left
	→		→	To 3 Xingqiao

== Gallery ==
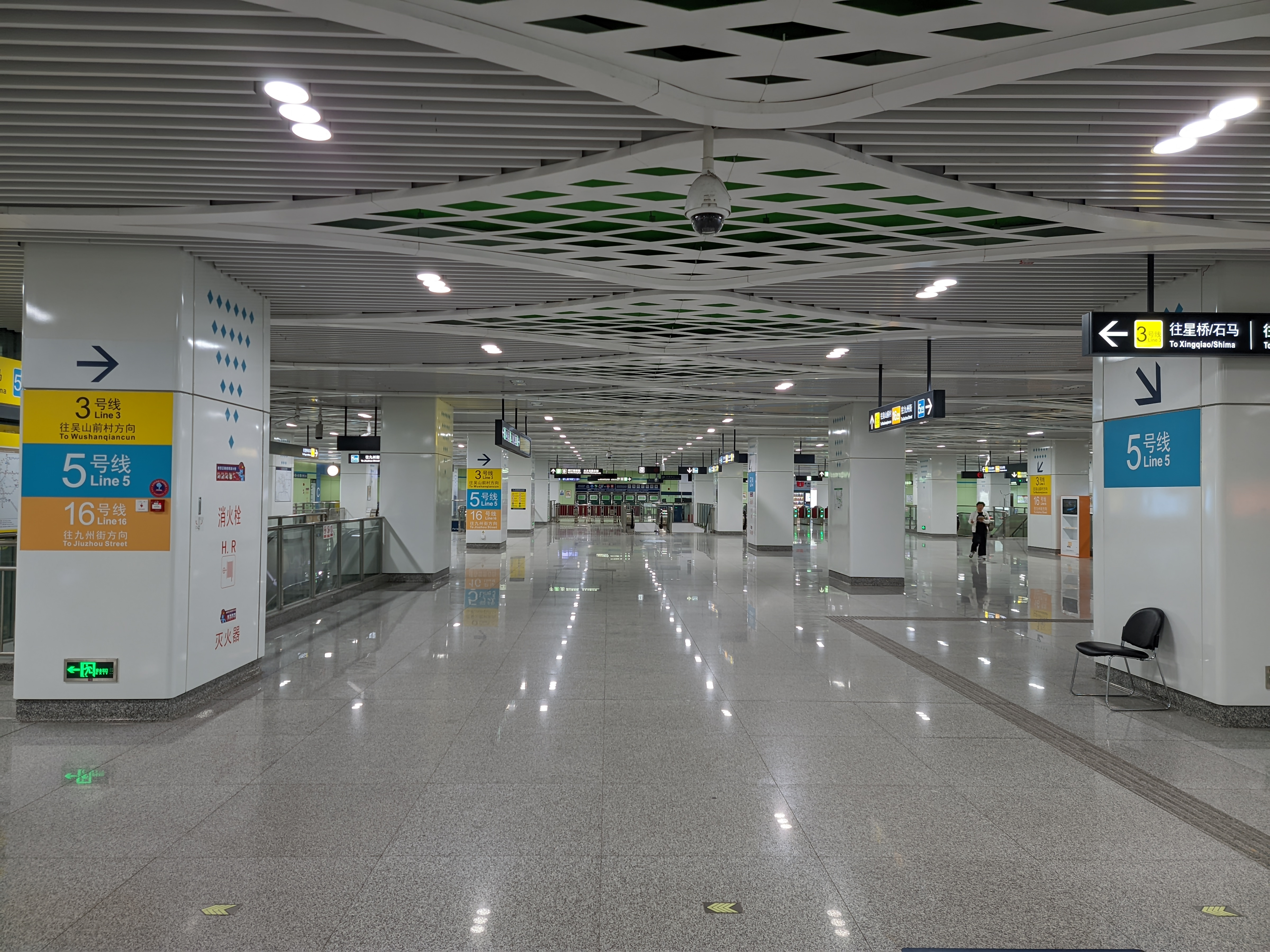
Concourse

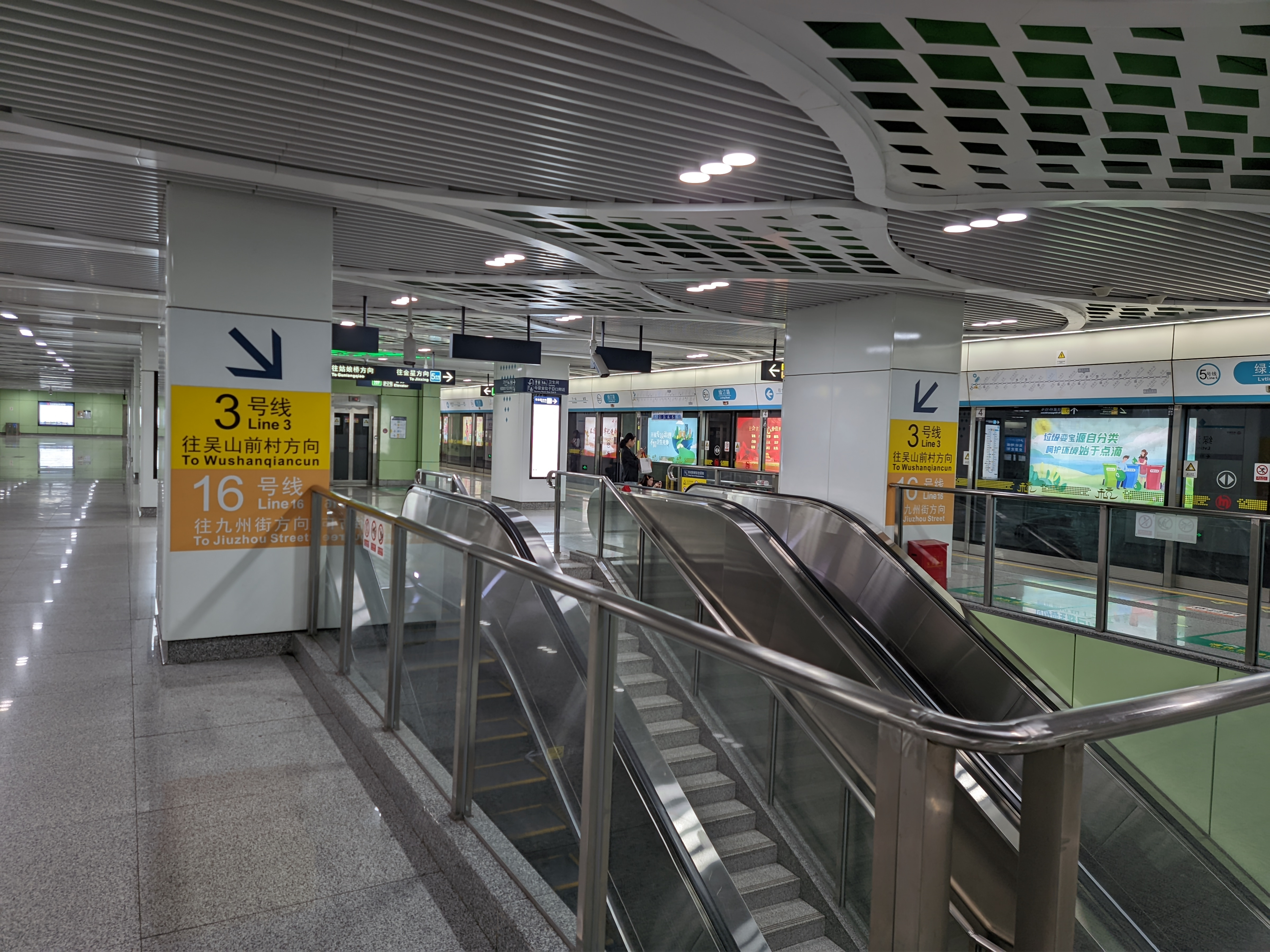
Transfer passage on Line 5 platform

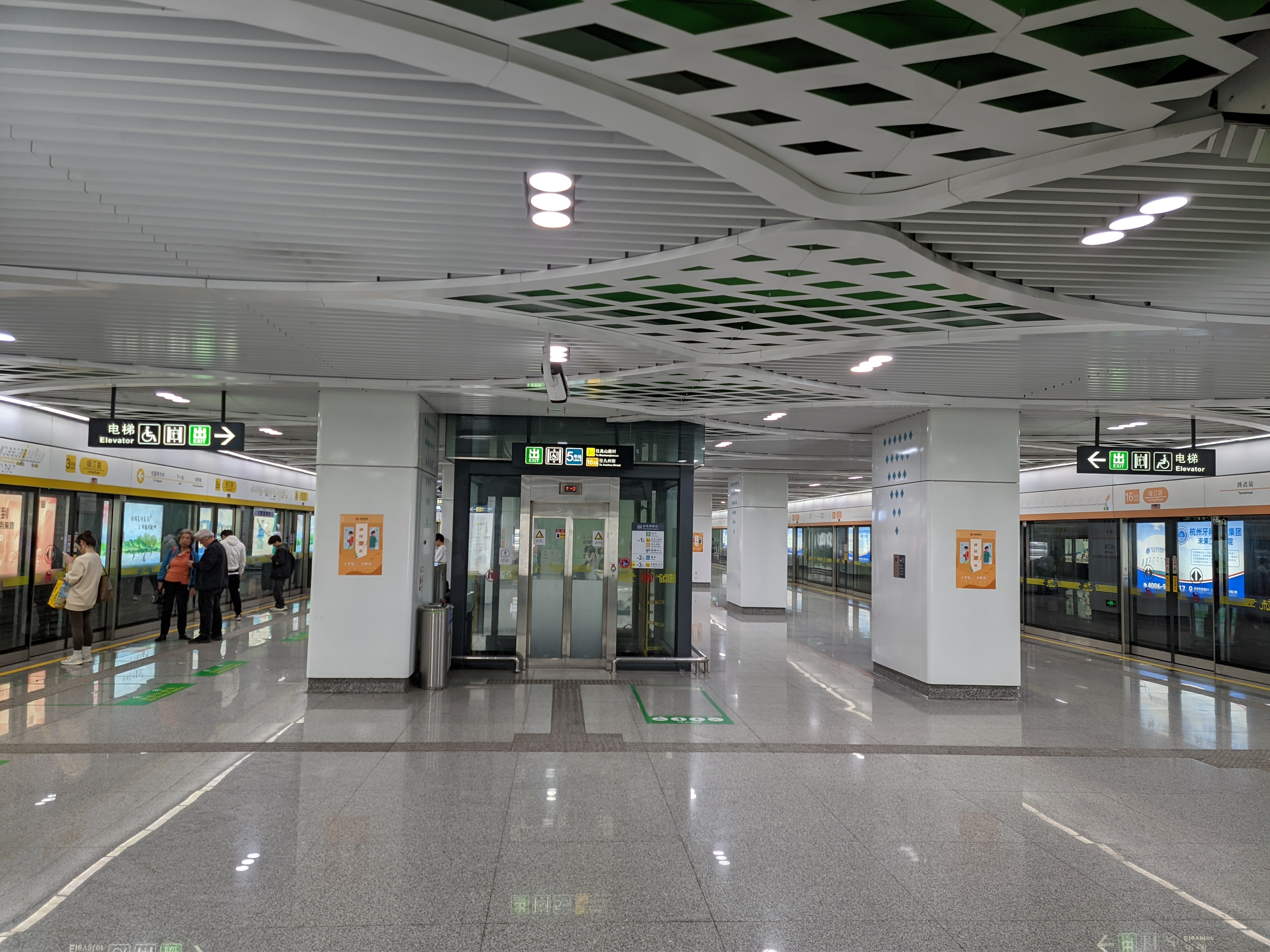
Line 3 to Xingqiao and Line 16 terminal platform
