= Jingchang Road station =

Metro station in Hangzhou, China

Jingchang Road 荆长路
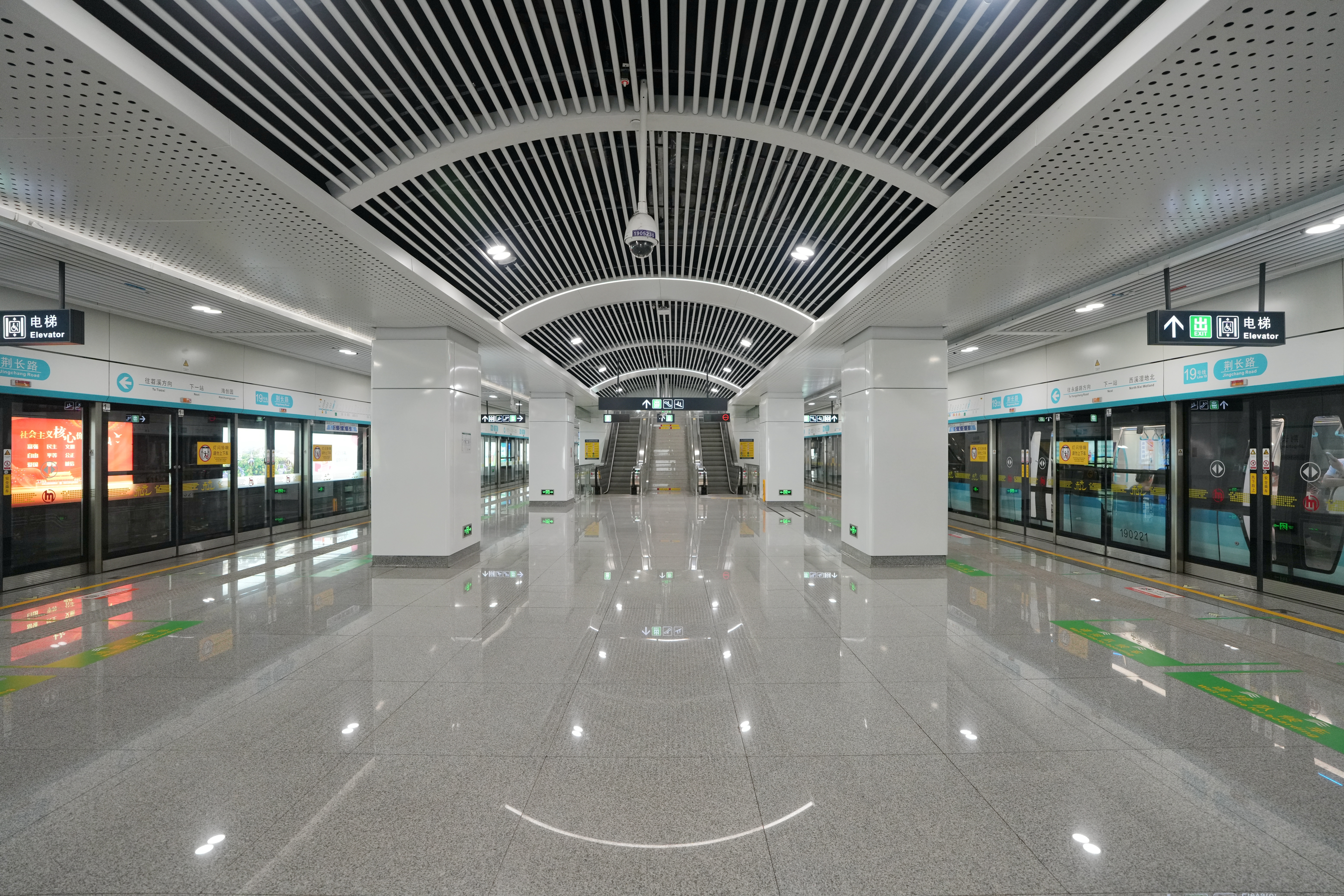
- Platforms

General information
- Location: Wenyi Road (W) × Jingchang Road; Yuhang District, Hangzhou, Zhejiang; China
- Coordinates: 30°17′20″N 120°02′19″E
- System: Hangzhou metro station
- Operator: Hangzhou Metro Corporation
- Line: Line 19
- Platforms: 2 (1 island platform)
- Tracks: 2

Construction
- Structure type: Underground
- Platform levels: 1
- Accessible: Yes

History
- Opened: 30 June 2025

Services
Preceding station	Hangzhou Metro	Following station
Haichuangyuan towards Tiaoxi	Line 19	North Xixi Wetland towards Yongsheng Road
Location

Jingchang Road (simplified Chinese: 荆长路; traditional Chinese: 荊長路) is a metro station of Line 19 of the Hangzhou Metro in China. It is located at the intersection of Wenyi Road (W) and Jingchang Road, in Yuhang District of Hangzhou. The station was opened on 30 June 2025.

== Station layout ==
Jingchang Road has two levels: a concourse, and an island platform with two tracks for line 19.

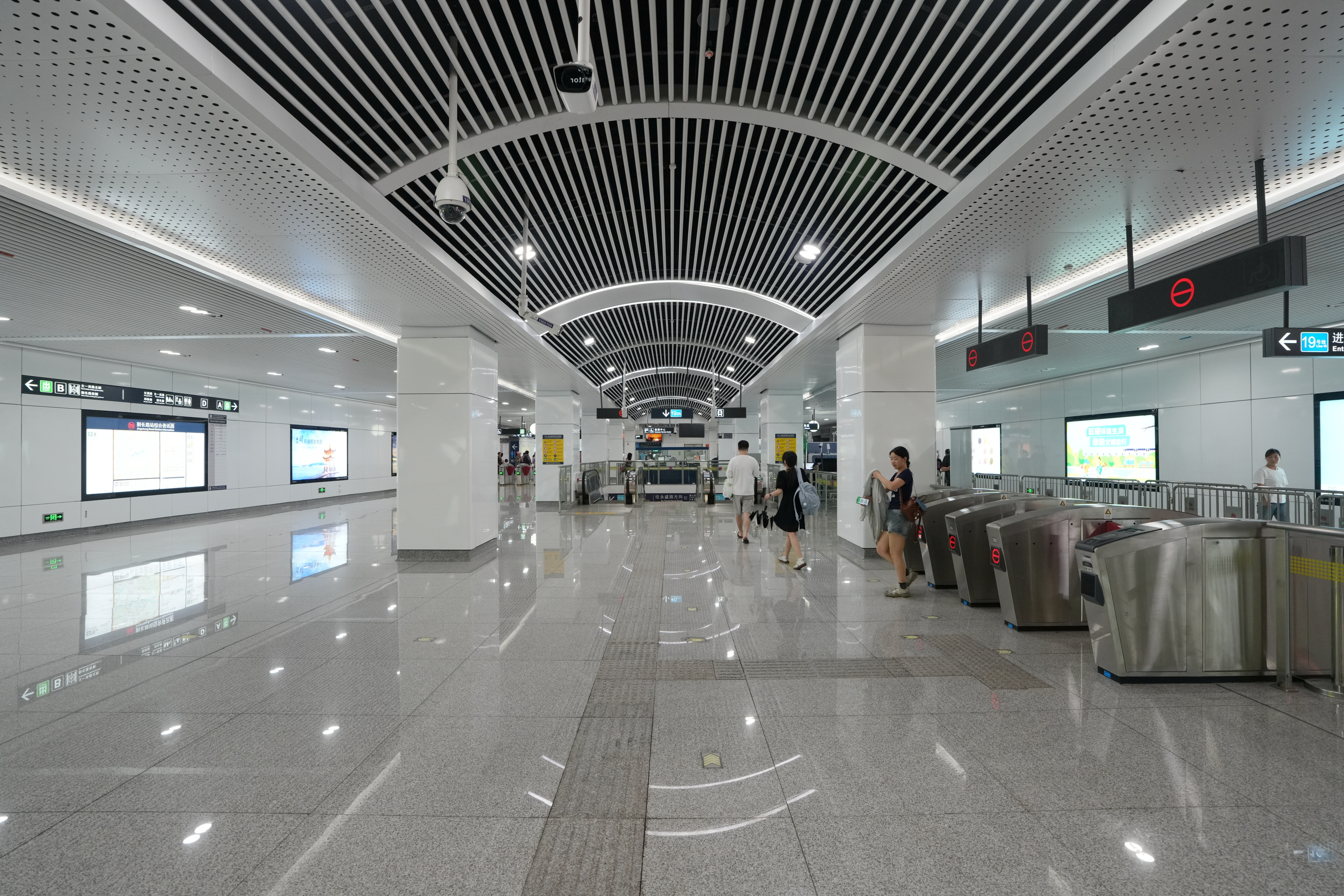
Concourse

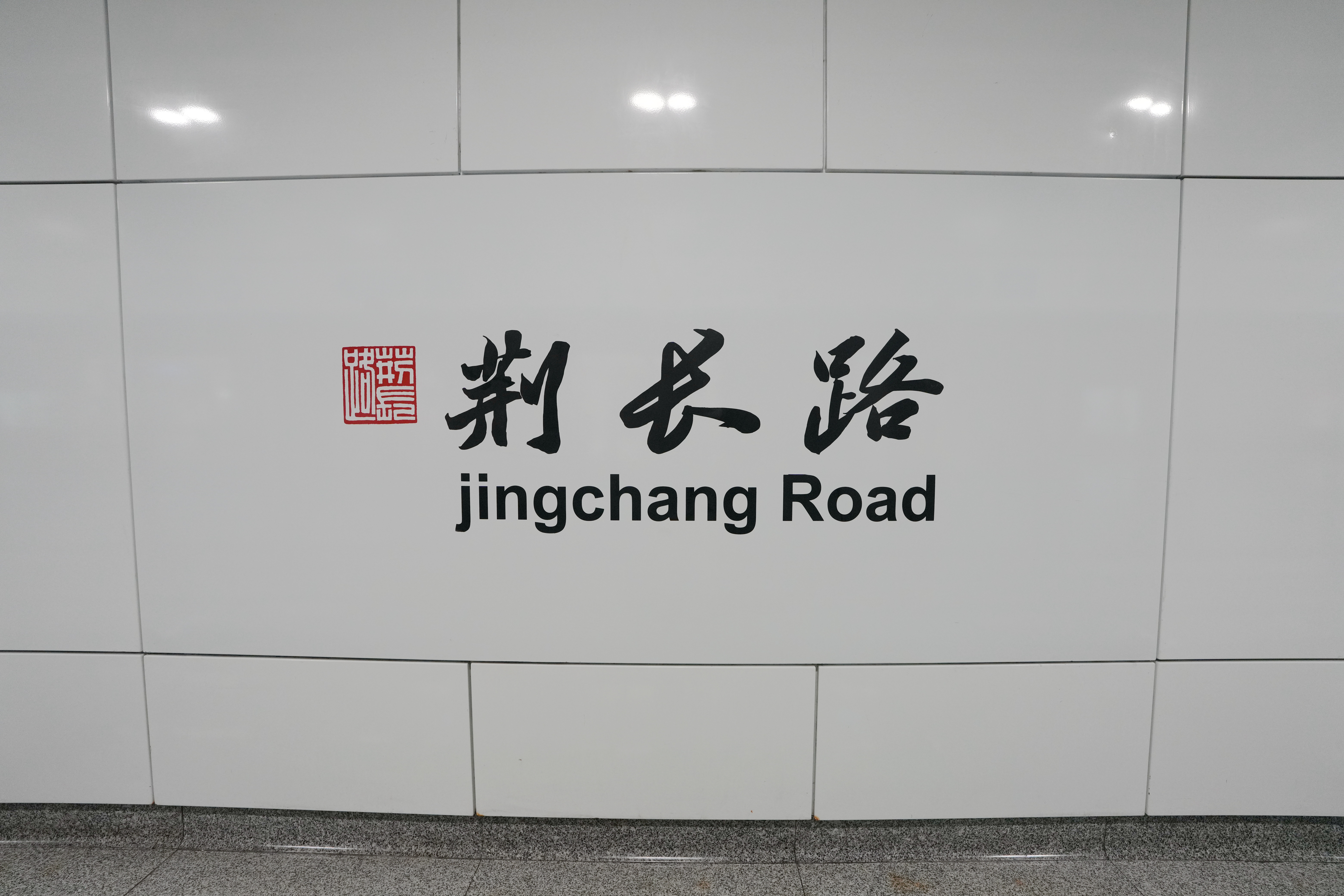
Station name in Chinese calligraphy

== Entrances/exits ==
- A: Feiniaoke Business Center
- B: Zhoujiadou community
- D1: Hongqi Road
- D2: Xixi Octagon City
