= Pinglan Road station =

Metro station in Hangzhou, China

Pinglan Road 平澜路
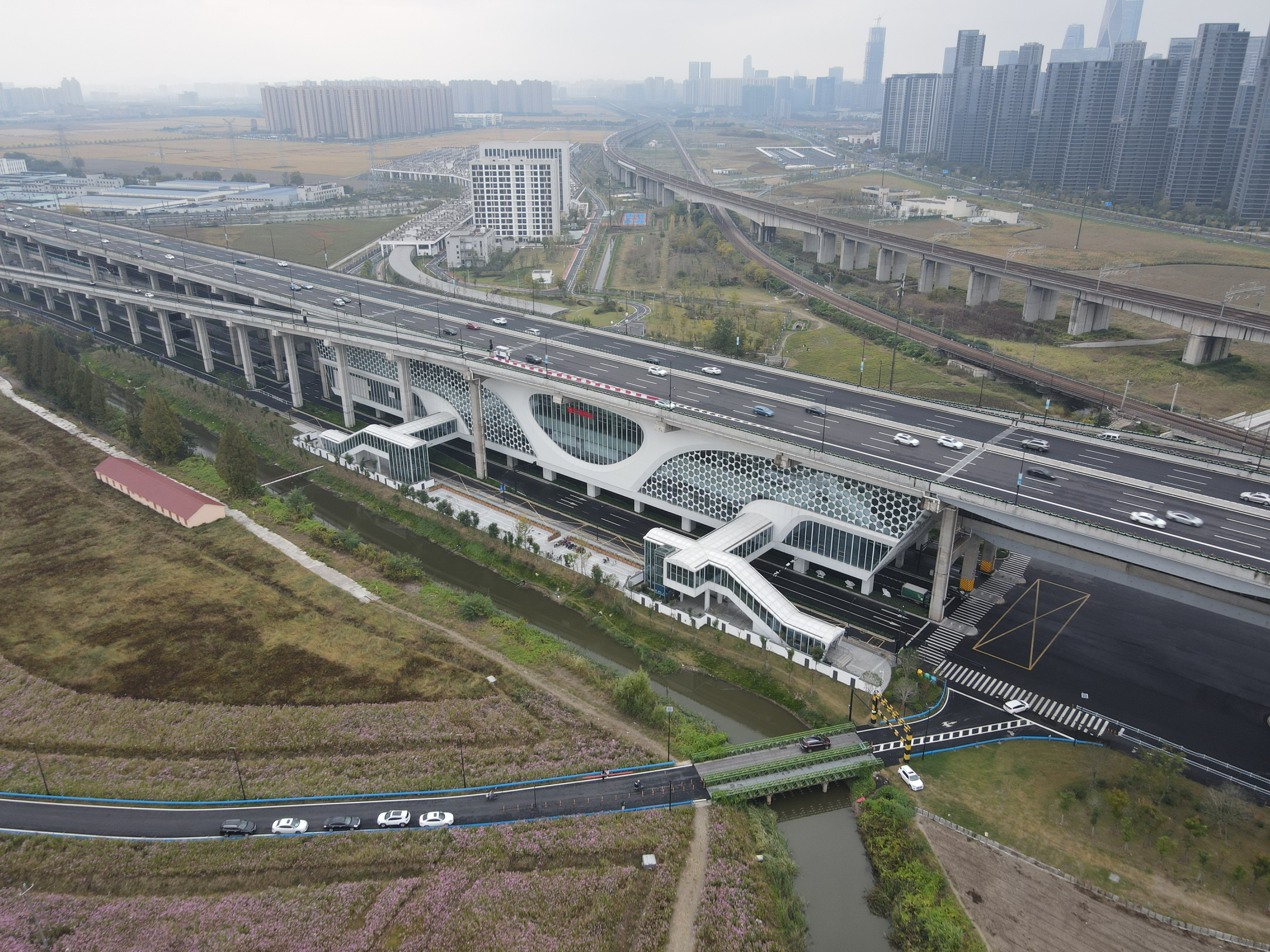
- Station building

General information
- Location: Konggang Avenue × Pinglan Road; Xiaoshan District, Hangzhou, Zhejiang; China
- Coordinates: 30°15′47″N 120°15′10″E
- System: Hangzhou metro station
- Operator: Hangzhou Metro Corporation
- Line: Line 19
- Platforms: 2 (2 side platforms)

Construction
- Structure type: Elevated
- Accessible: Yes

History
- Opened: 22 September 2022

Services
Preceding station	Hangzhou Metro	Following station
Yudao towards Tiaoxi	Line 19	Gengwen Road towards Yongsheng Road
Location

Pinglan Road (simplified Chinese: 平澜路; traditional Chinese: 平瀾路) is a metro station of Line 19 of the Hangzhou Metro in China. It is located in Xiaoshan District of Hangzhou. The station was opened on 22 September 2022.

== Station layout ==
Pinglan Road has two levels: a concourse, and two side platforms with two tracks for line 19.

== Entrances/exits ==
- A1 & A2: north side of Konggang Avenue
- B1 & B2: north side of Konggang Avenue, Pinglan Road
- C1 & C2: south side of Konggang Avenue, Pinglan Road
- D1 & D2: south side of Konggang Avenue
