= Yicheng Road station =

Metro station in Hangzhou, China

Yicheng Road 驿城路
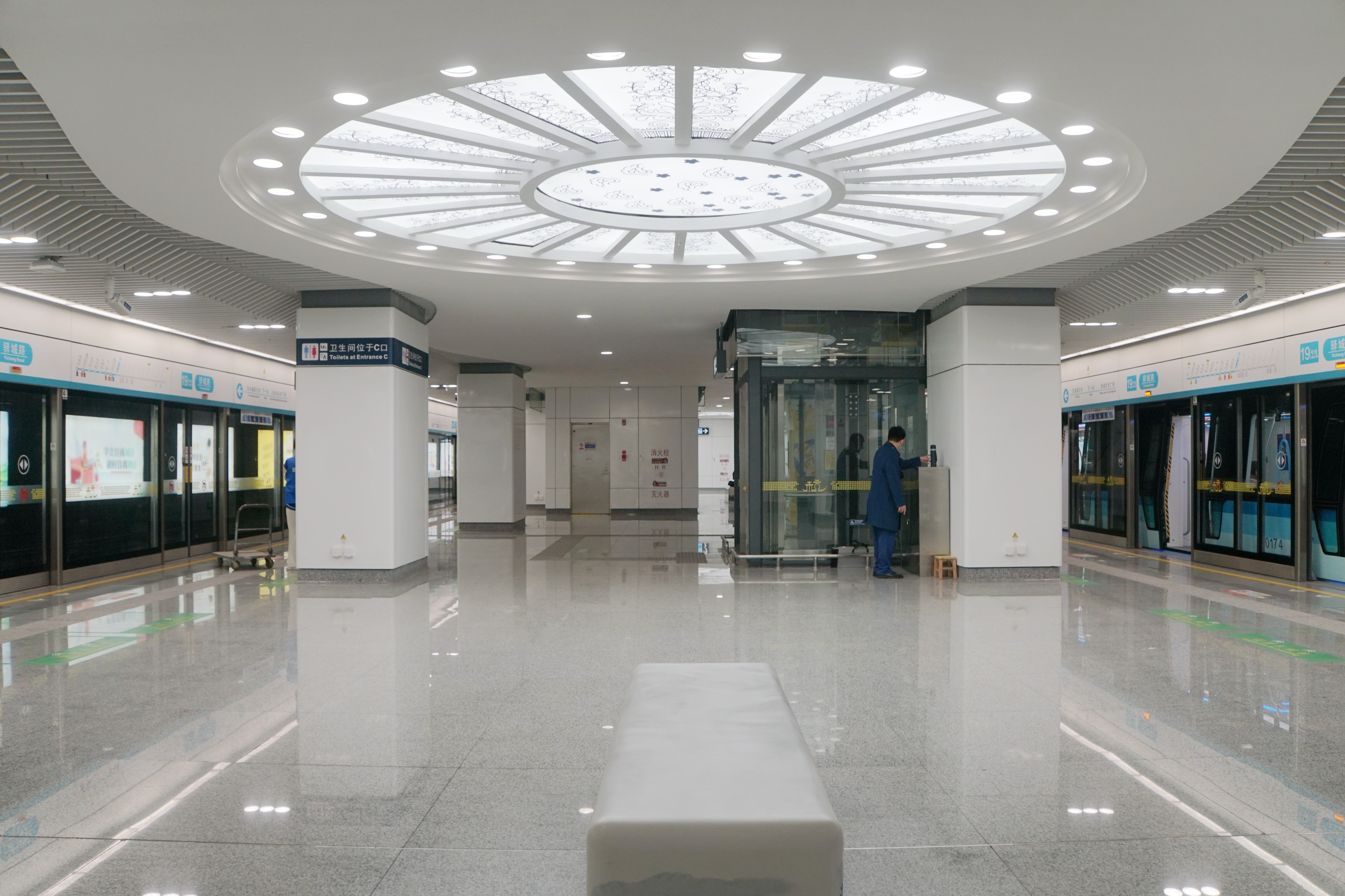
- Platform of Line 19

General information
- Location: Yicheng Road × Xinfeng Road/Meijiaqu Street (Line 19); Shangcheng District, Hangzhou, Zhejiang; China
- Coordinates: 30°18′02″N 120°11′38″E
- System: Hangzhou metro station
- Operator: Hangzhou Metro Corporation
- Line: Line 19
- Platforms: 2 (1 island platform)

Construction
- Structure type: Underground
- Accessible: Yes

History
- Opened: 30 November 2023

Services
Preceding station	Hangzhou Metro	Following station
West Lake Cultural Square towards Tiaoxi	Line 19	East Railway Station (East Square) towards Yongsheng Road
Location

Yicheng Road (simplified Chinese: 驿城路; traditional Chinese: 驛城路) is a metro station of Line 19 of the Hangzhou Metro in China. It is located in Shangcheng District of Hangzhou. The station was opened on 30 November 2023. It will be an interchange station of Line 18 and Line 19, which Line 18 is under construction and hoped to be opened on 2028.

== Station layout ==
Yicheng Road has two levels: a concourse, and an island platform with two tracks for line 19.

== Entrances/exits ==
- A: west side of Yicheng Road, north side of Xinfeng Road
- B: Xinfeng Yueju Community
- C: Tiancheng Palace
- D: north side of Xinfeng Road, east side of Yicheng Road

== Gallery ==
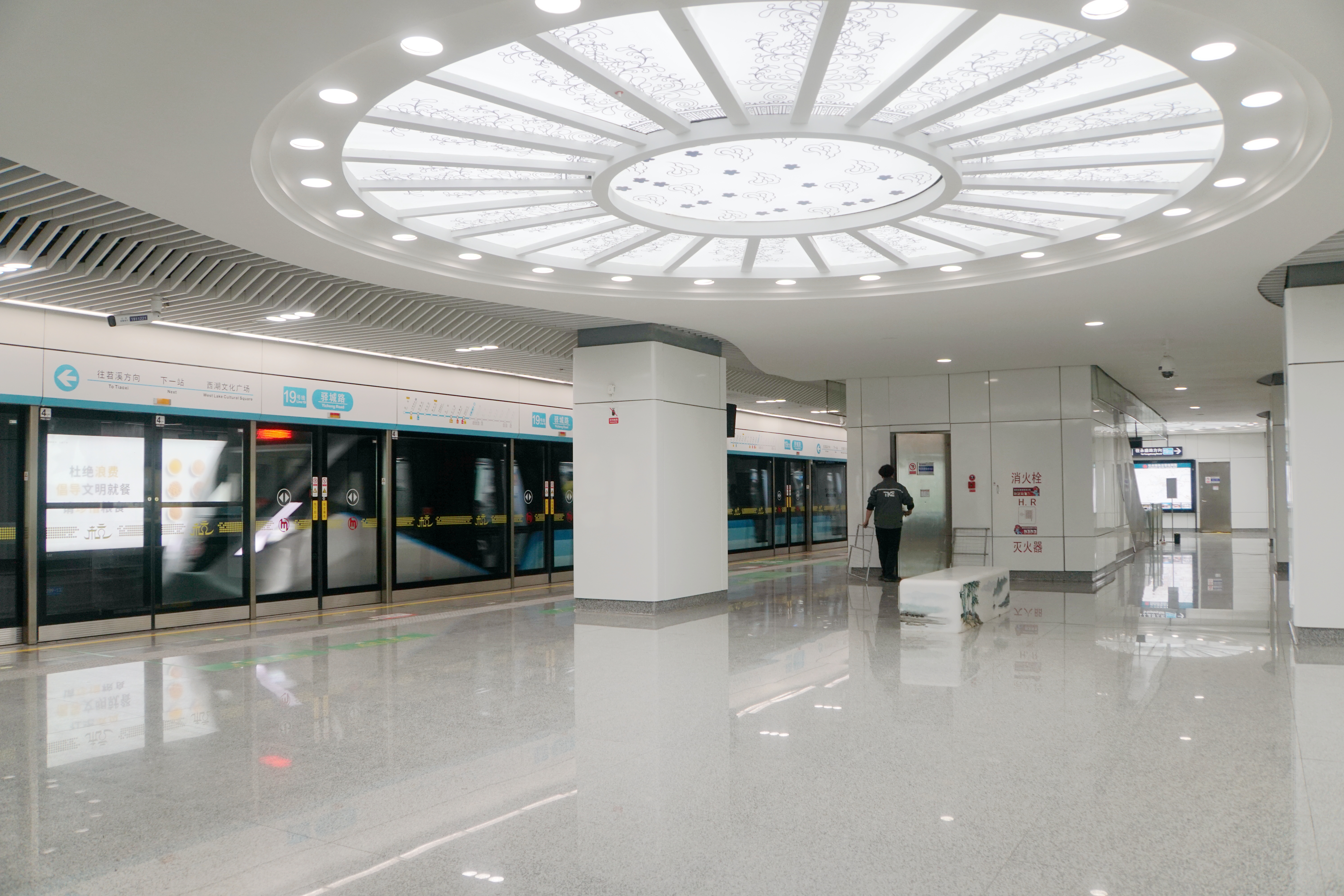
Platform

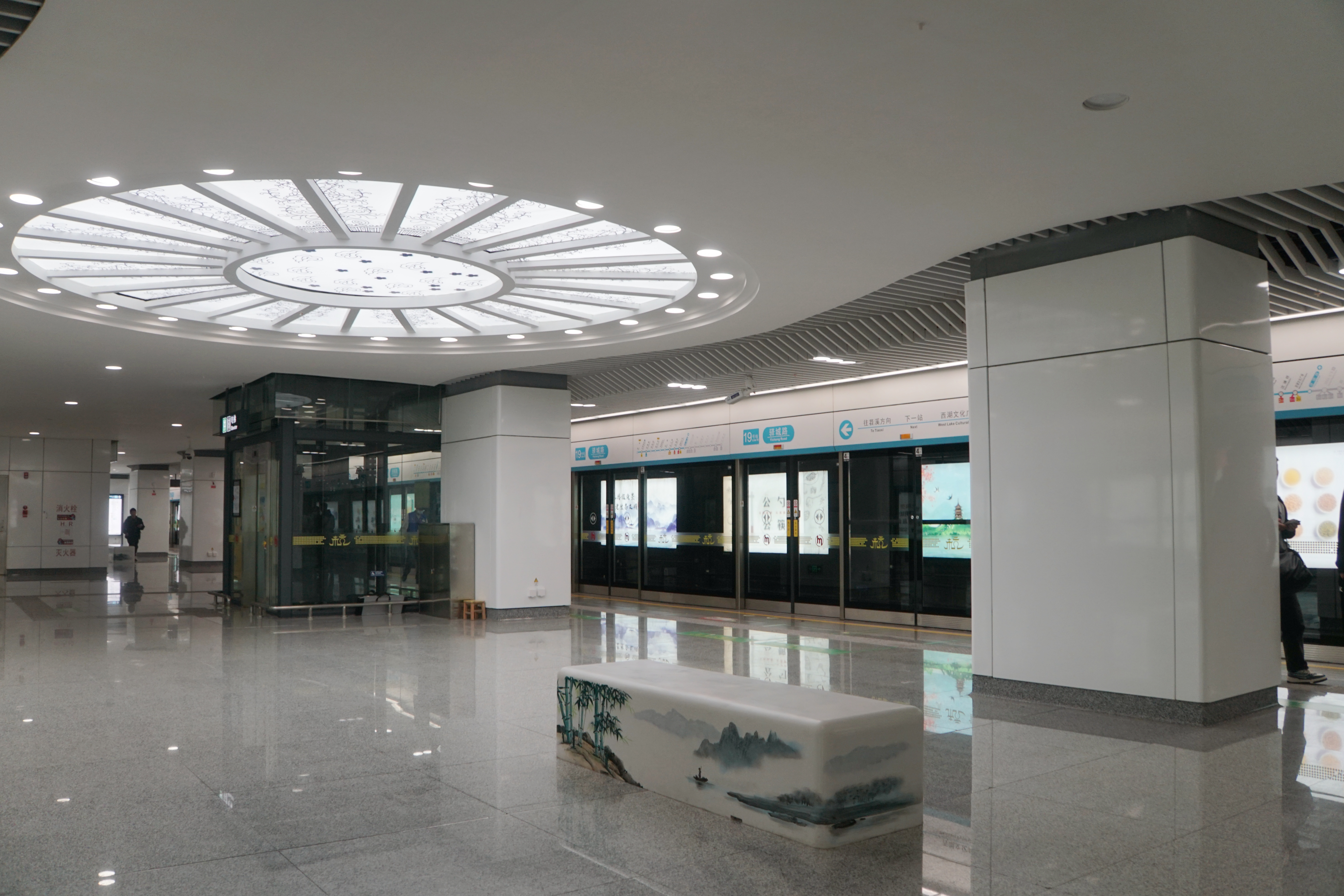
Platform

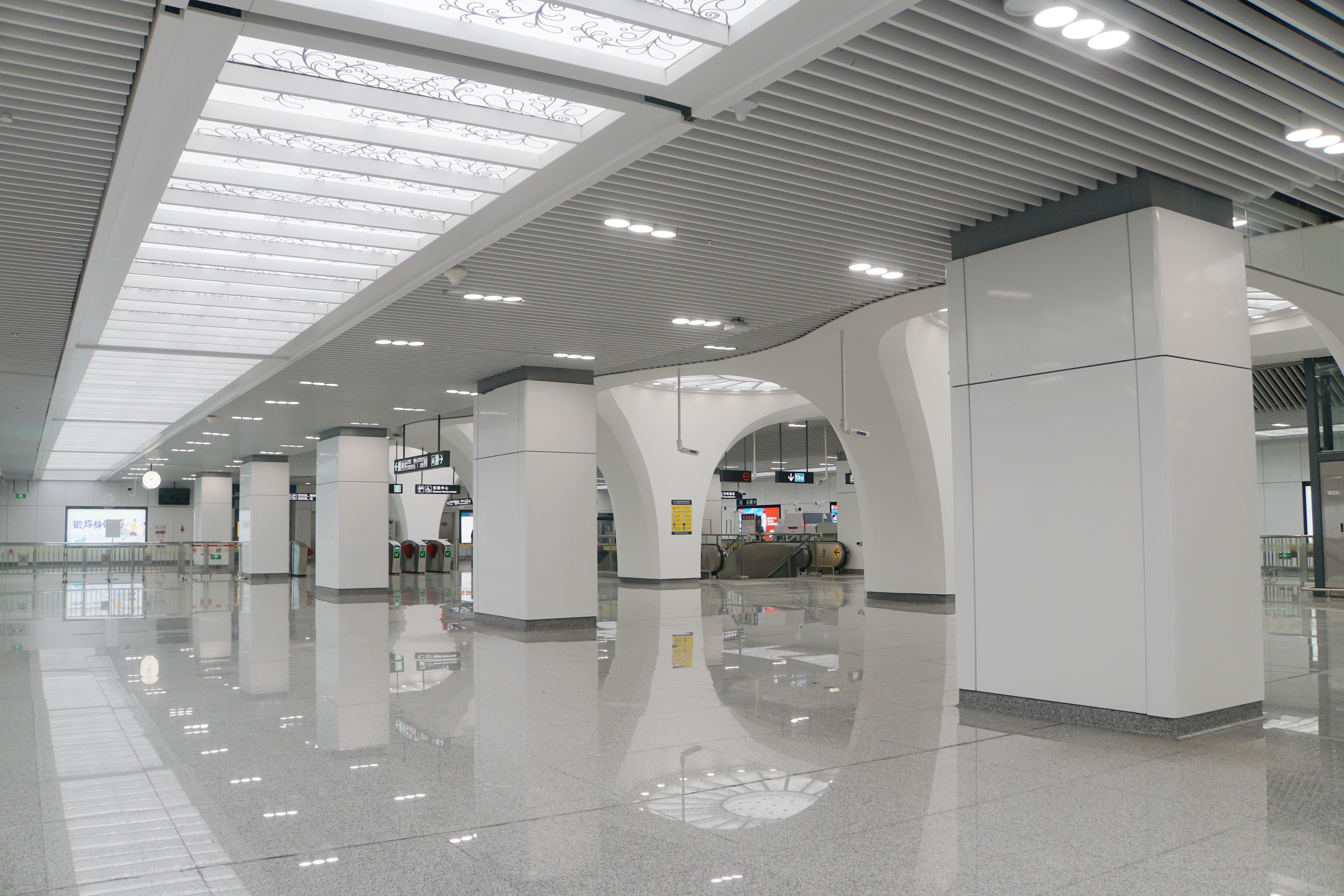
Concourse

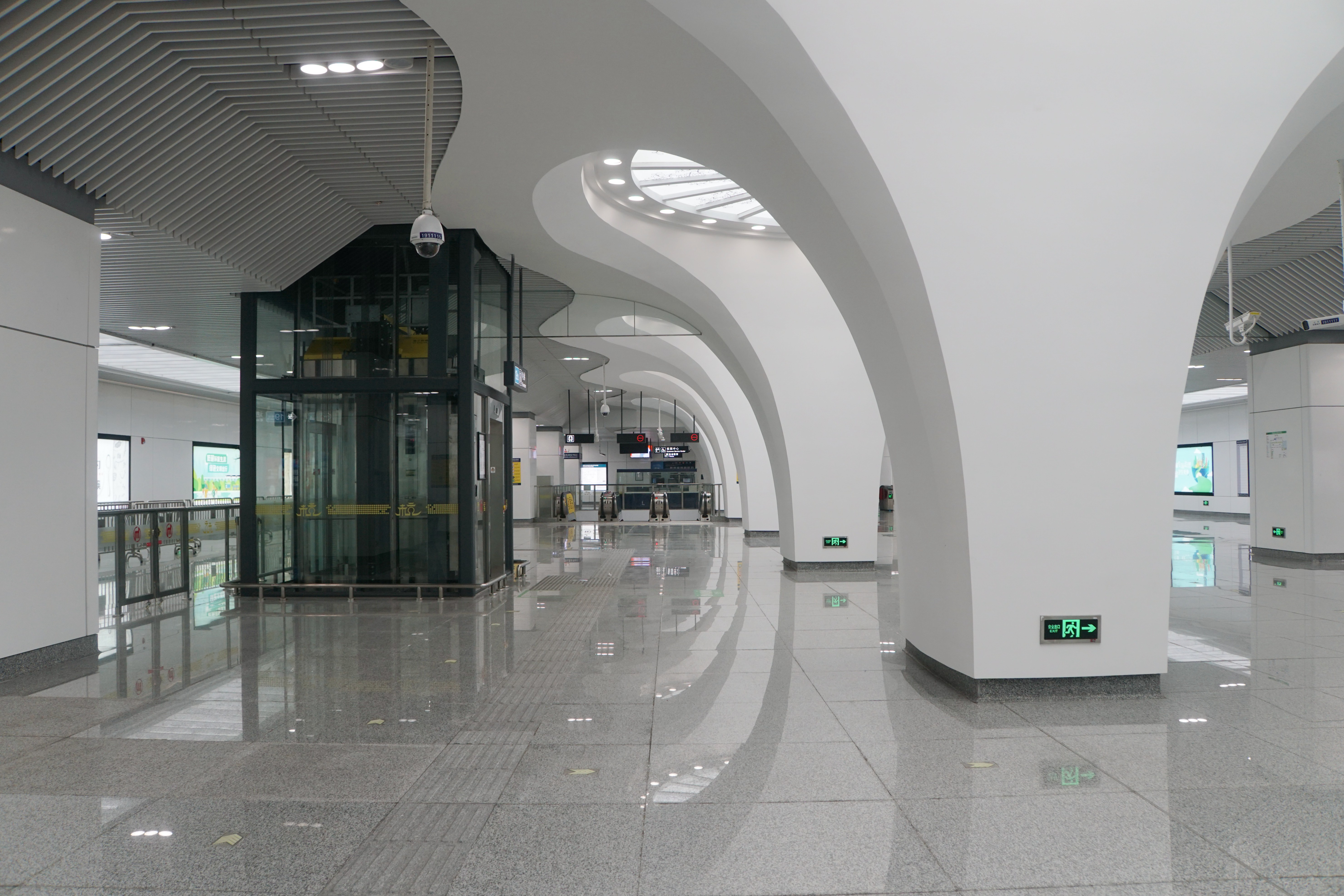
Concourse

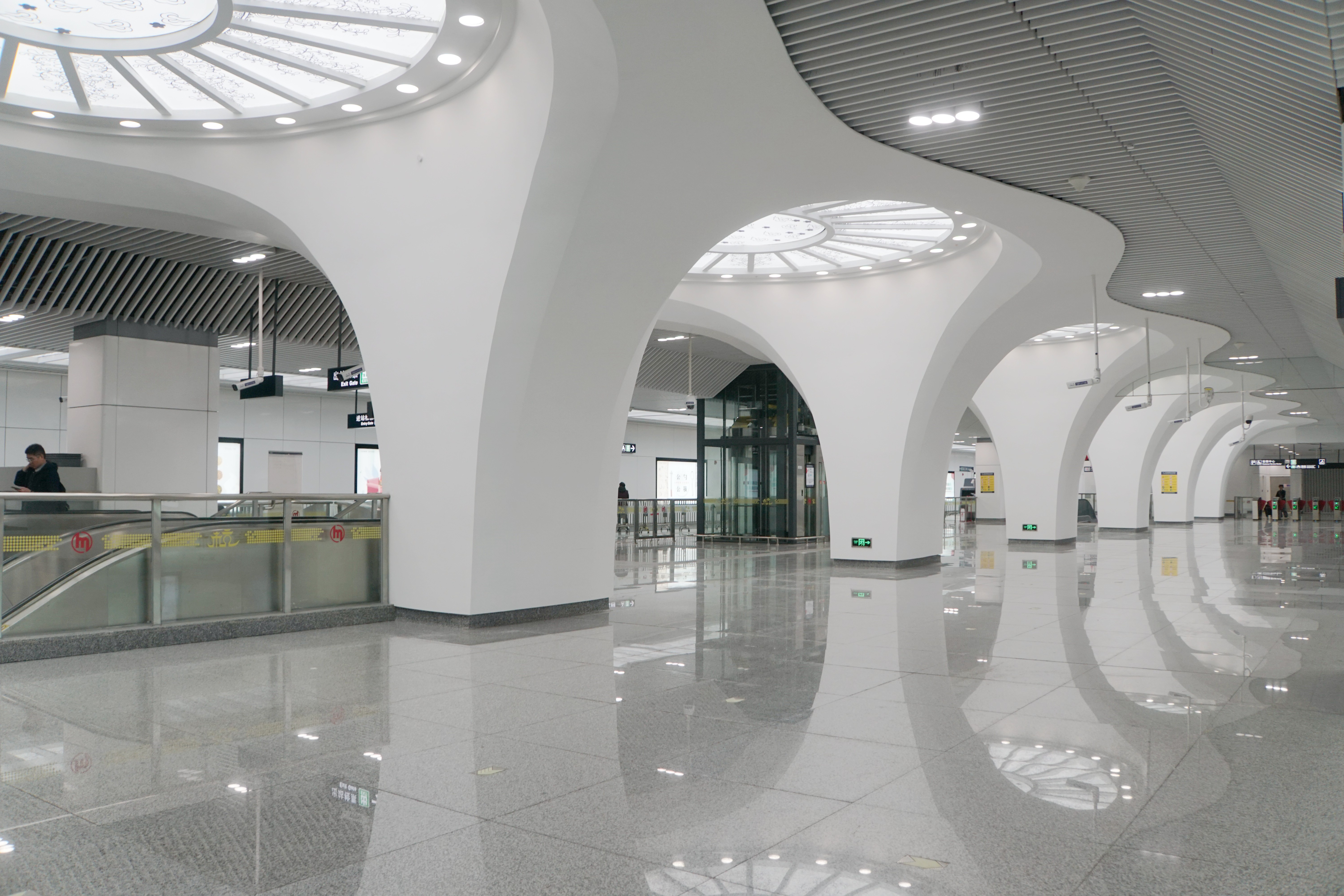
Concourse

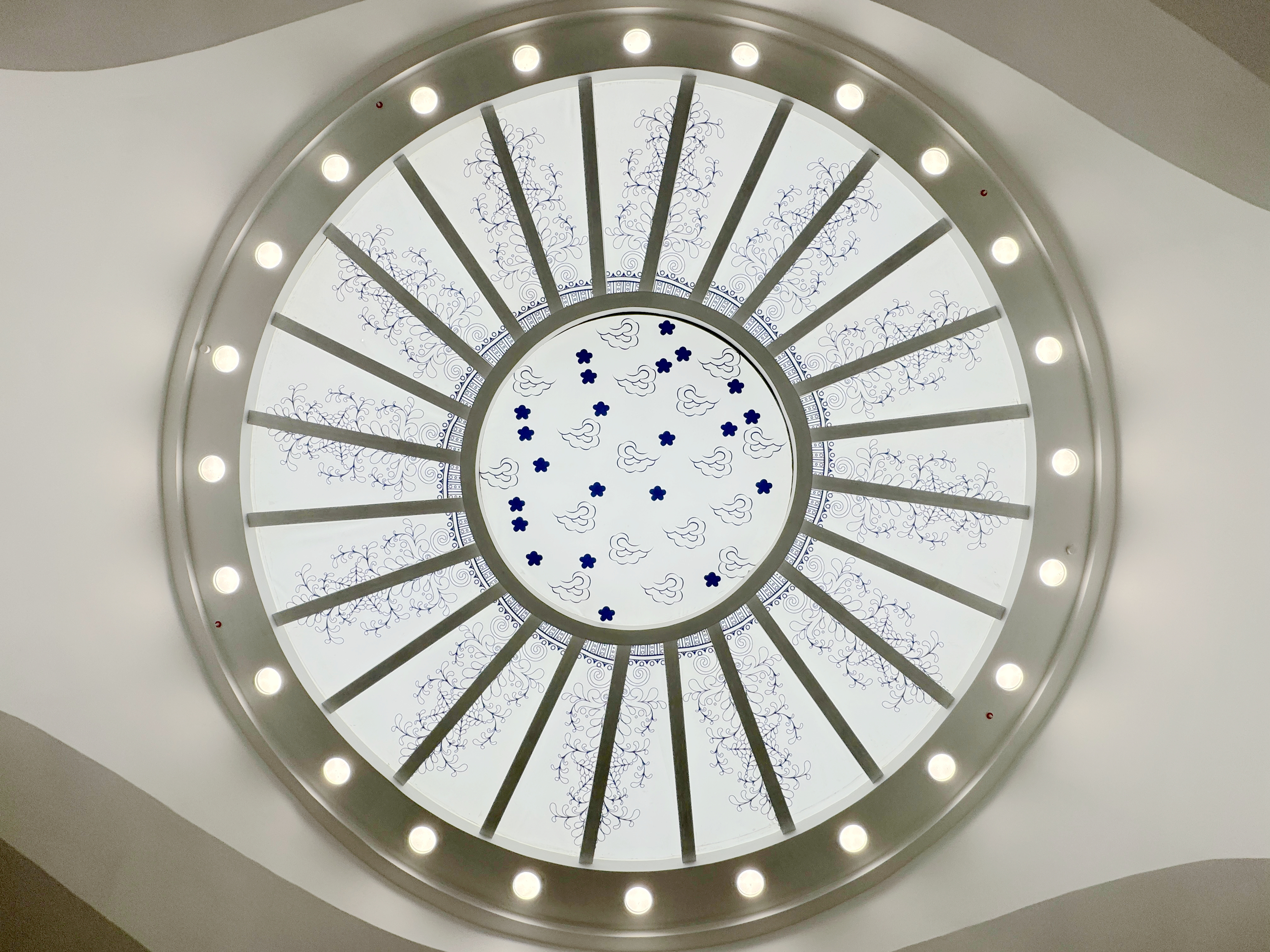
Ceiling

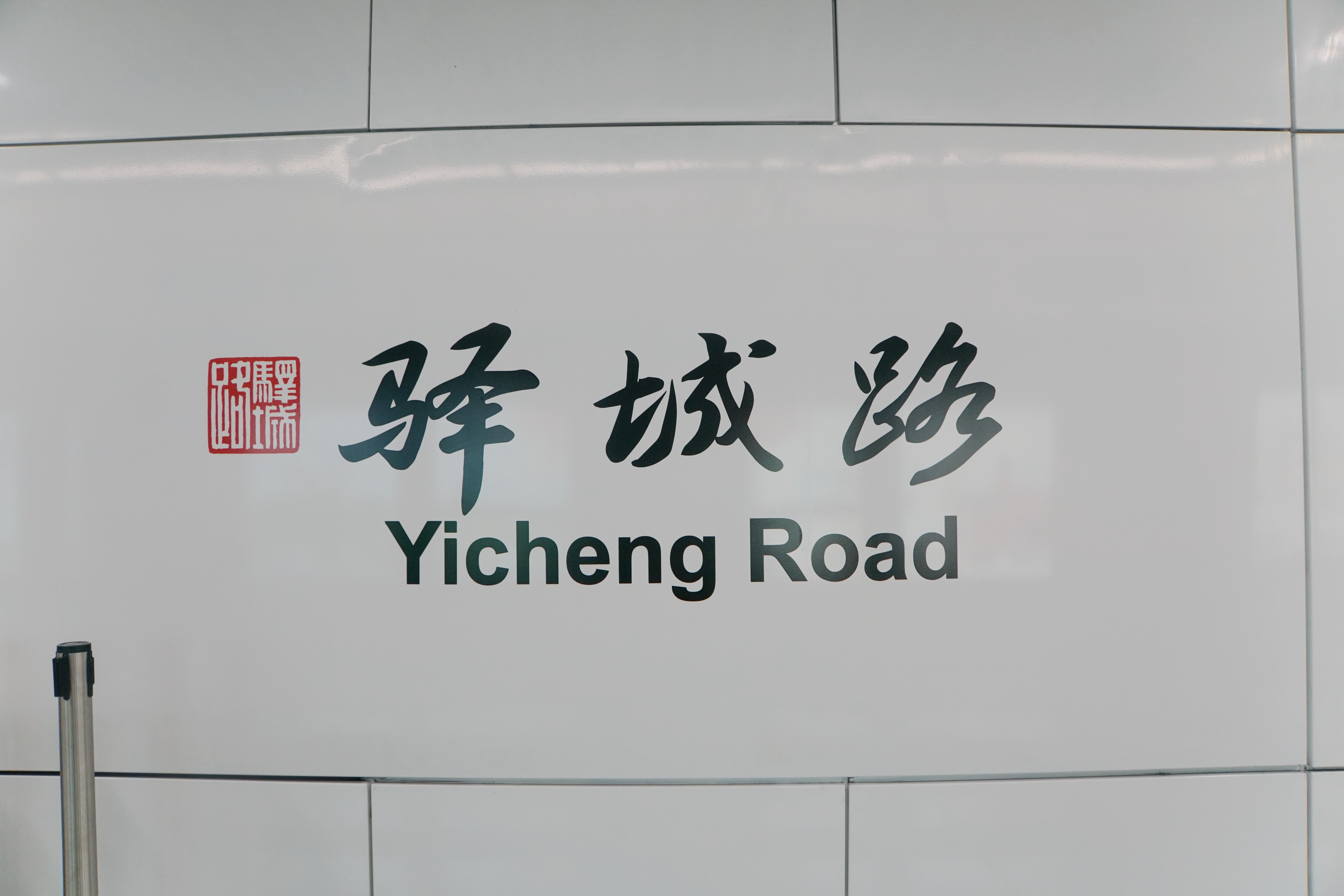
Station name in Chinese calligraphy
