= Zhixing Road station =

Metro station in Hangzhou, China

Coordinates: 30°13′50.23″N 120°19′53.22″E

Zhixing Road 知行路
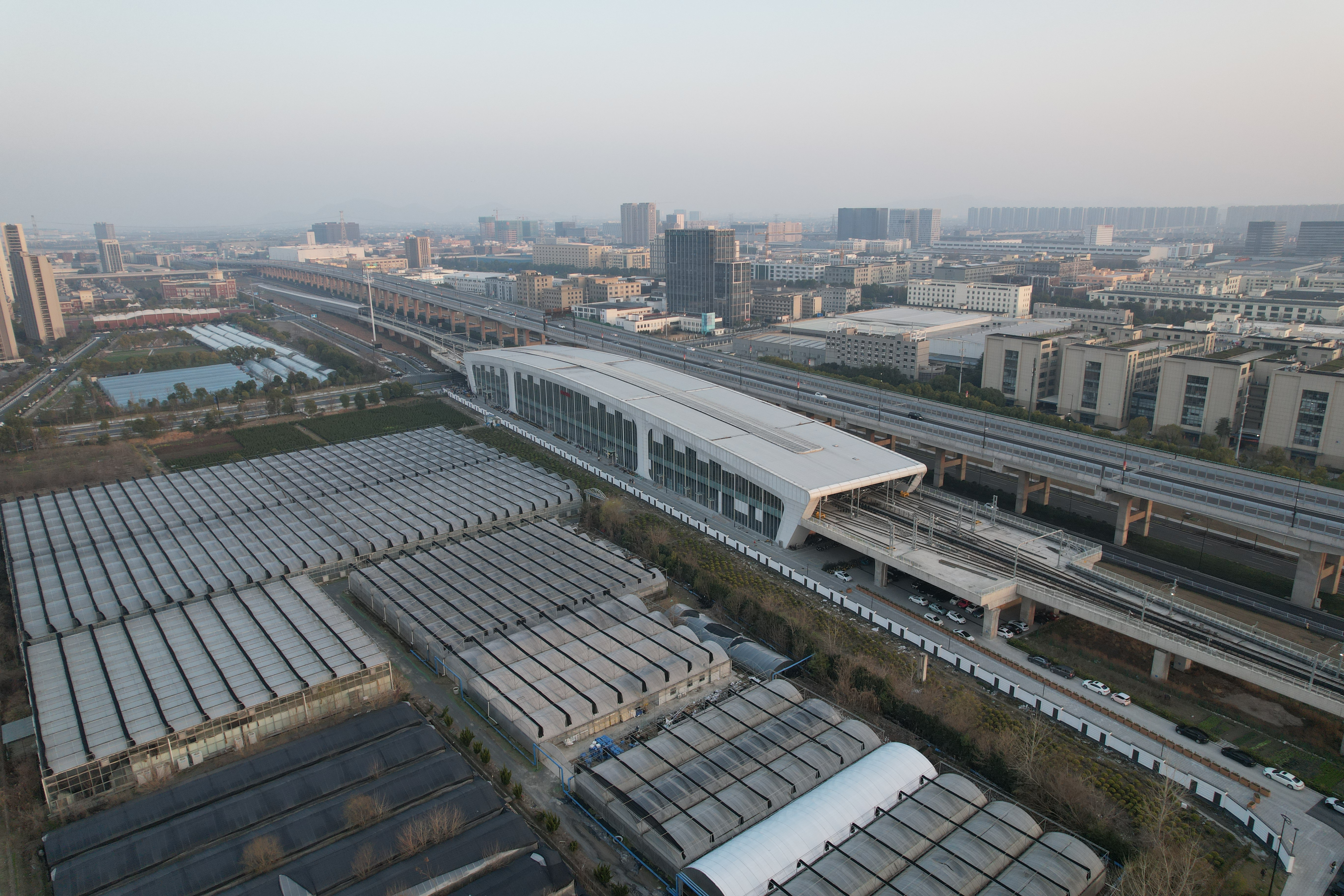
- Station Building

General information
- Location: Xiaoshan District, Hangzhou, Zhejiang; China
- Operated by: Hangzhou Metro Corporation
- Line(s): Line 19
- Platforms: 4 (2 island platforms)

History
- Opened: 22 September 2022

Services
Preceding station	Hangzhou Metro	Following station
Gengwen Road towards Tiaoxi	Line 19	Xiaoshan International Airport towards Yongsheng Road

Zhixing Road (Chinese: 知行路) is a metro station of Line 19 of the Hangzhou Metro in China. It is located in Xiaoshan District of Hangzhou. The station was opened on 22 September 2022.
