= West Lake Cultural Square station =

Hangzhou Metro station

Coordinates: 30°16′55″N 120°09′39″E

West Lake Cultural Square 西湖文化广场
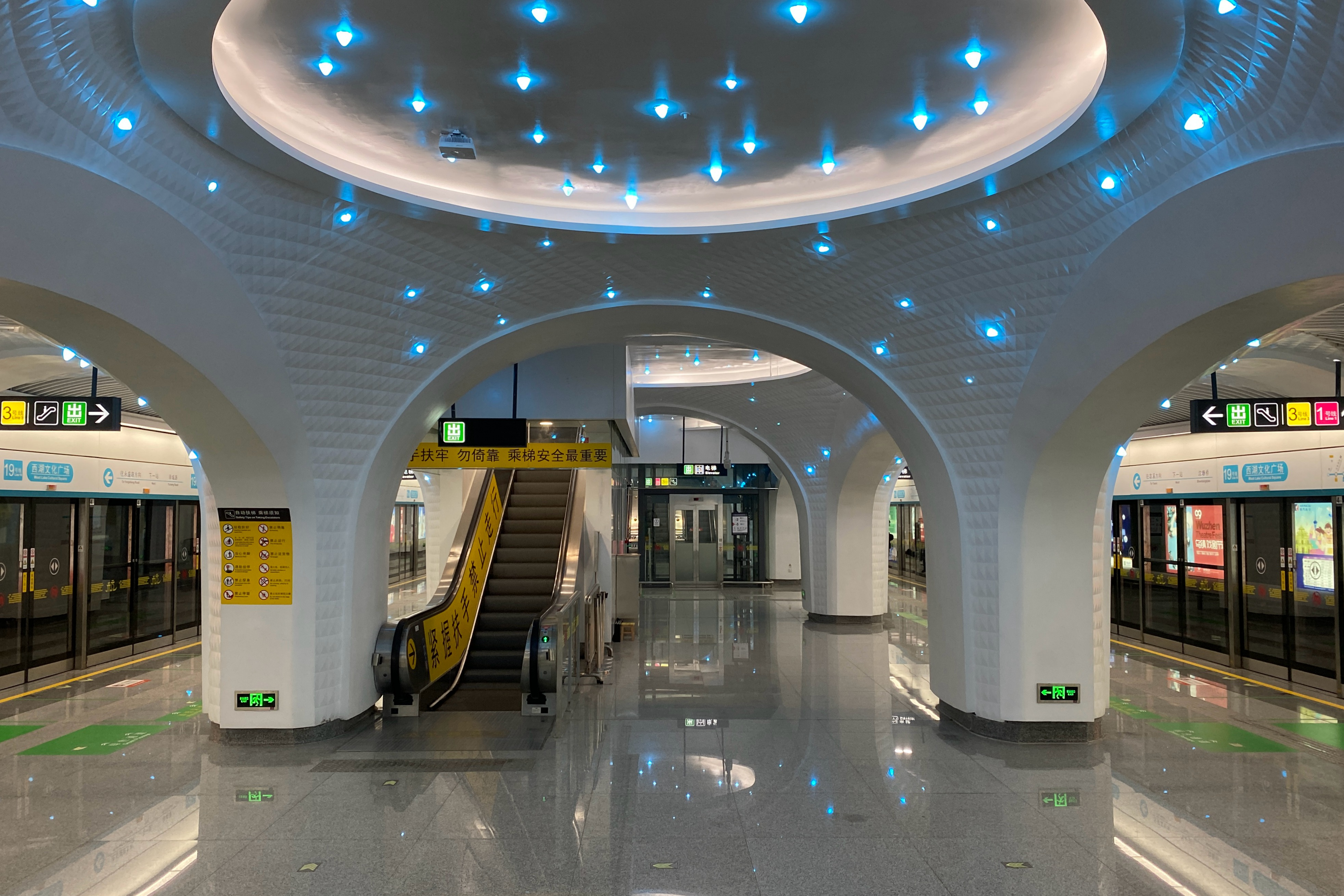
- Line 19 platform

General information
- Location: Gongshu District, Hangzhou, Zhejiang; China
- Operated by: Hangzhou Metro Corporation
- Line(s): Line 1 Line 3 Line 19
- Platforms: 6 (3 island platform)

History
- Opened: 24 November 2012 (Line 1); 10 June 2022 (Line 3); 22 September 2022 (Line 19)

Services
Preceding station	Hangzhou Metro	Following station
Wulin Square towards Xianghu	Line 1	Datieguan towards Xiaoshan International Airport
Wulin Square towards Wushanqiancun or Shima	Line 3	Chaowang Road towards Xingqiao
Shentangqiao towards Tiaoxi	Line 19	Yicheng Road towards Yongsheng Road

West Lake Cultural Square (Chinese: 西湖文化广场) is an interchange station between Line 1, Line 3 and Line 19 of Hangzhou Metro in China. It was opened in November 2012, together with the rest of the stations on Line 1. It is located at Xihuwenhua Square in Gongshu District of Hangzhou. The station is designed to accommodate a paired cross-platform interchange with Line 3.

== Station structure ==
A same-direction cross-platform interchange is provided between Line 1 and Line 3.

=== Lines 1 & 3 platform layout ===
Island Platform on B2

To 3 Wushanqiancun or Shima	←	Urban rail transit in China	←
	Doors open on the left
	Doors open on the right
To 1 Xianghu	←	Urban rail transit in China	←

Island Platform on B3

→	Urban rail transit in China	→	To 3 Xingqiao
Doors open on the right
Doors open on the left
→	Urban rail transit in China	→	To 1 Xiaoshan International Airport
