= Gengwen Road station =

Metro station in Hangzhou, China

Gengwen Road 耕文路
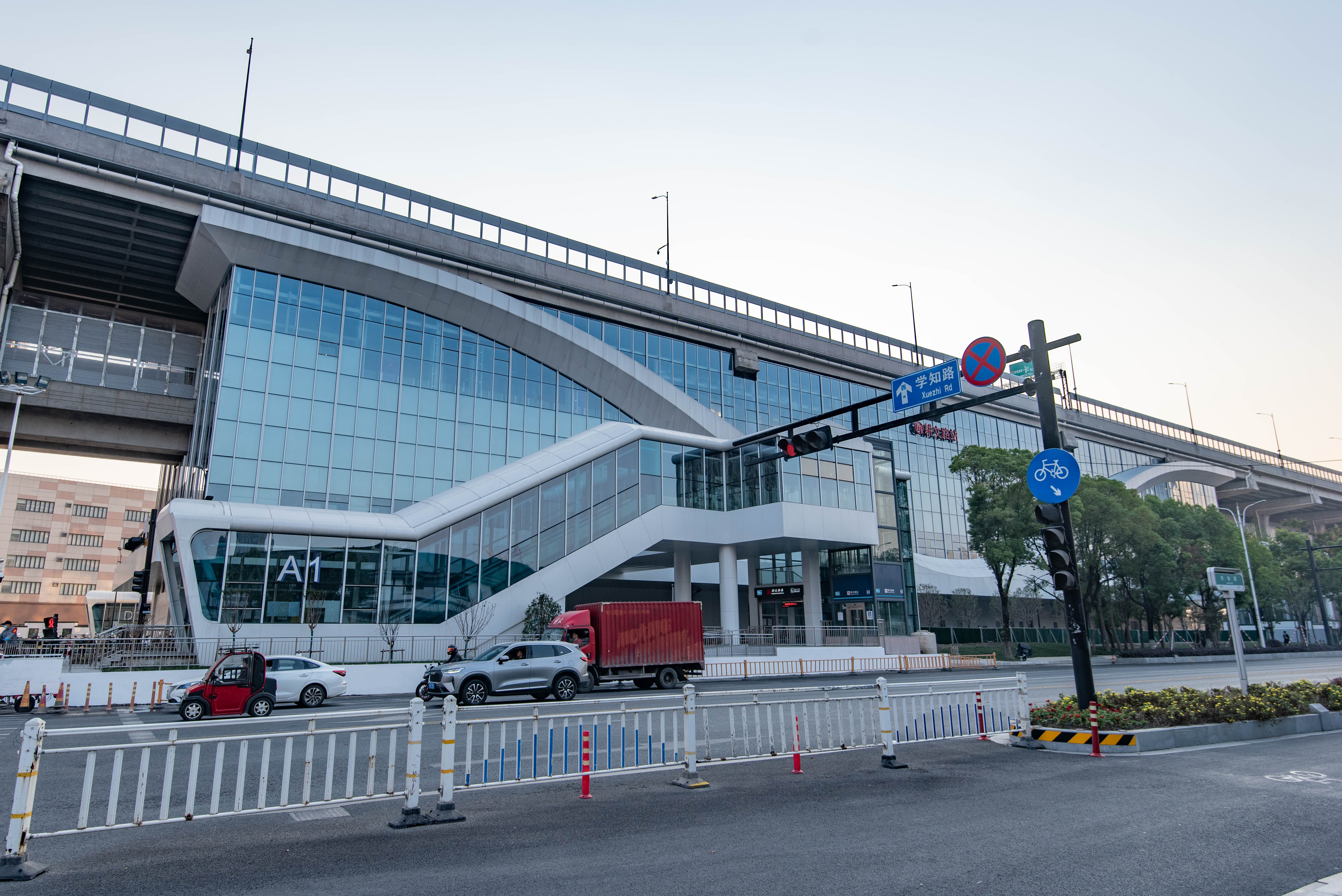
- Station Building

General information
- Location: Xiaoshan District, Hangzhou, Zhejiang; China
- Operated by: Hangzhou Metro Corporation
- Line: Line 19
- Platforms: 2 (2 side platforms)

History
- Opened: 22 September 2022

Services
Preceding station	Hangzhou Metro	Following station
Pinglan Road towards Tiaoxi	Line 19	Zhixing Road towards Yongsheng Road
Location

Gengwen Road (Chinese: 耕文路) is a metro station of Line 19 of the Hangzhou Metro in China. It is located in Xiaoshan District of Hangzhou. The station was opened on 22 September 2022.
