= East Railway Station (East Square) station =

Metro station in Hangzhou, China

East Railway Station (East Square) 火车东站（东广场）
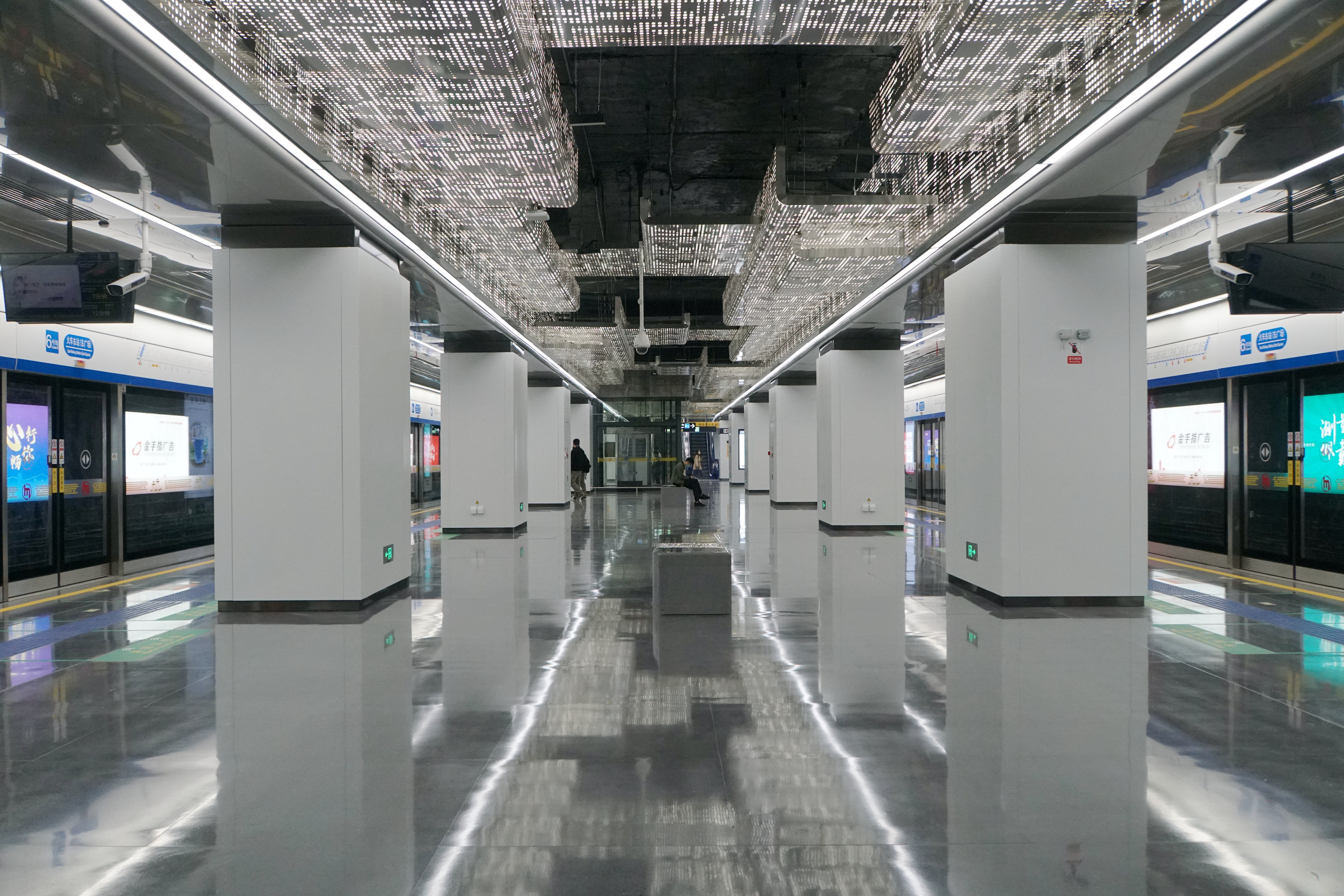
- Platforms of Line 6

General information
- Location: Dongning Road × Hongtai Road/Hexing Road; Shangcheng District, Hangzhou, Zhejiang; China
- Coordinates: 30.29616°N 120.21203°E
- System: Hangzhou metro station
- Operator: Hangzhou Metro Corporation
- Lines: Line 6 Line 19
- Platforms: 4 (2 island platforms)
- Connections: HGH; Line 1 Line 4 (via East Railway Station)

Construction
- Structure type: Underground
- Accessible: Yes

History
- Opened: 6 November 2021 (Line 6); 22 September 2022 (Line 19)

Services
| Preceding station | Hangzhou Metro | Following station |
|---|---|---|
| Yuanbaotang towards West Guihua Road or Shuangpu | Line 6 | Goujulong Terminus |
| Yicheng Road towards Tiaoxi | Line 19 | Yudao towards Yongsheng Road |
Route map
Location

East Railway Station (East Square) (Chinese: 火车东站（东广场）) is a metro station on Line 6 and Line 19 of the Hangzhou Metro in China. It is located in the Shangcheng District. It opened on November 6, 2021.

== Station layout ==
East Railway Station (East Square) has five floors. Basement 1 is a concourse, basements 2 and 3 are equipment areas. Basement 4 are Line 6's platforms and basement 5 are Line 19's platforms. Each of these consists of an island platform with two tracks.

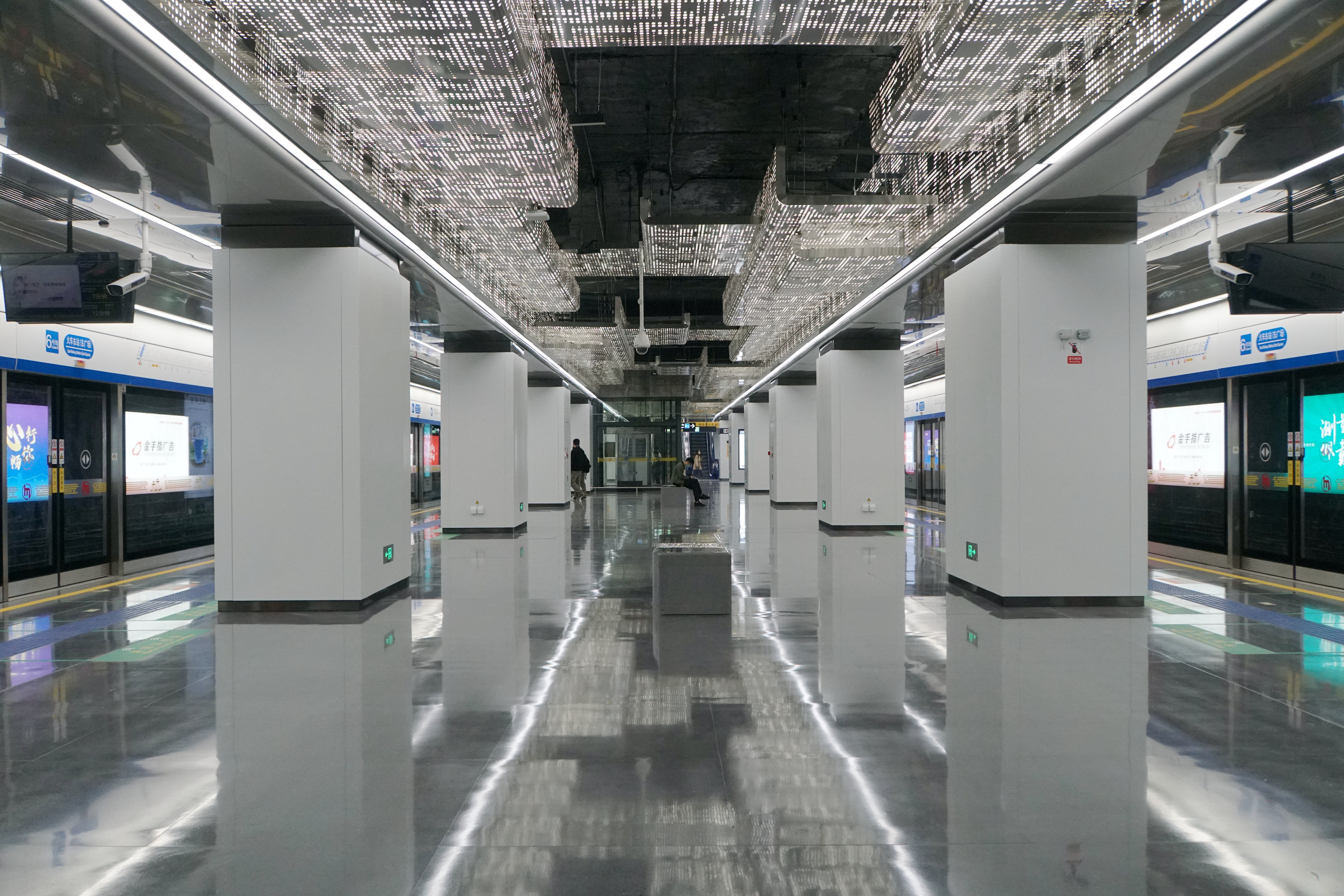
Platforms of Line 6

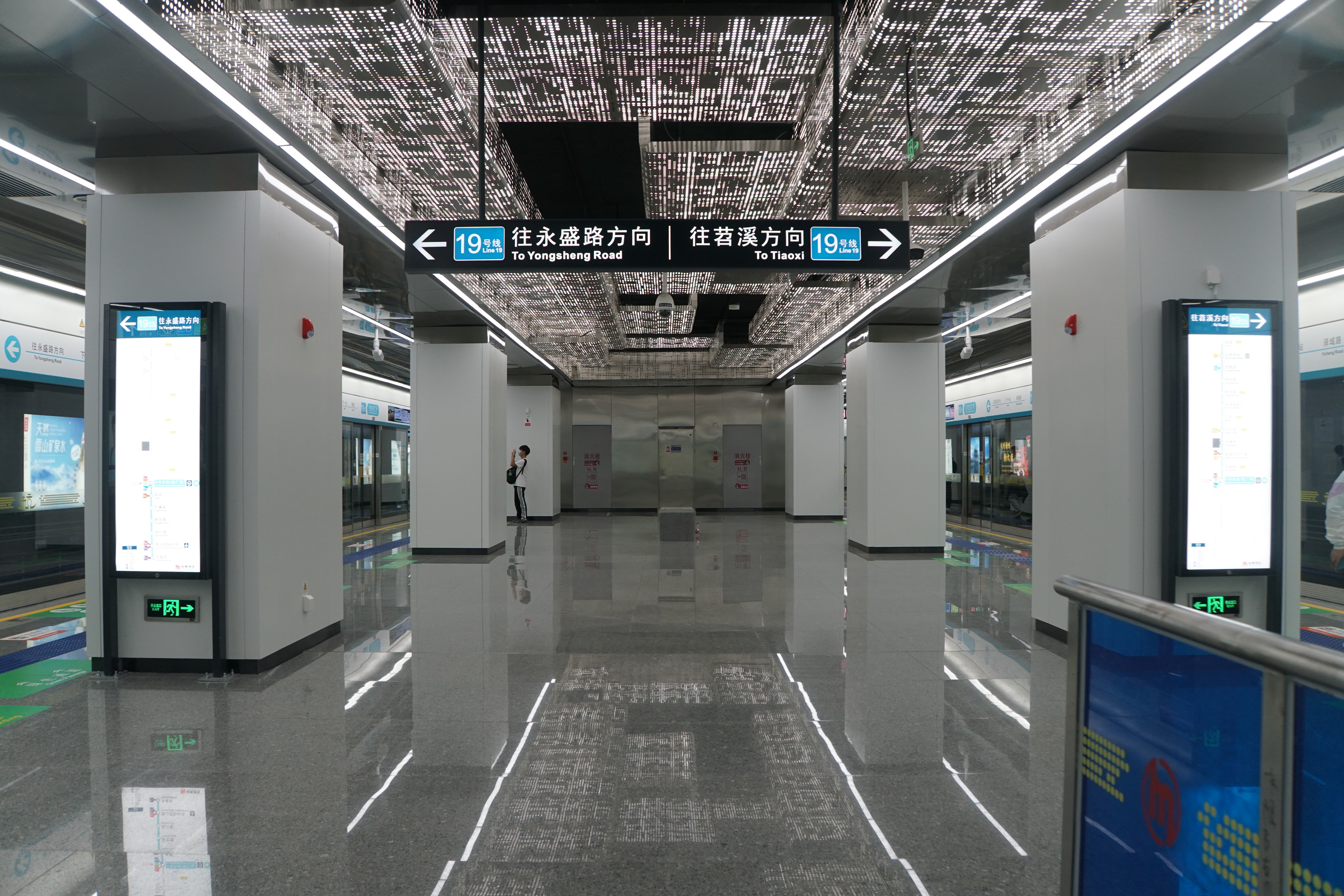
Platforms of Line 19

=== Interchange ===
Passengers using Hangzhou Tong transportation card, metro QR codes and UnionPay IC cards to take the metro, may transfer to Lines 1 and 4 at East Railway Station within 30 minutes after getting out of the station for free. Passengers using single-journey tickets, should buy the tickets again.

== Entrances/exits ==
- (No labels): Hangzhou East railway station, East Railway Station of metro Lines 1 & 4
- F: Mixc Enterprise Center
- G: Kuka Building
- H1 & H2: east side of Dongning Road
- J: Hangzhou Dongzhan MIXC ONE
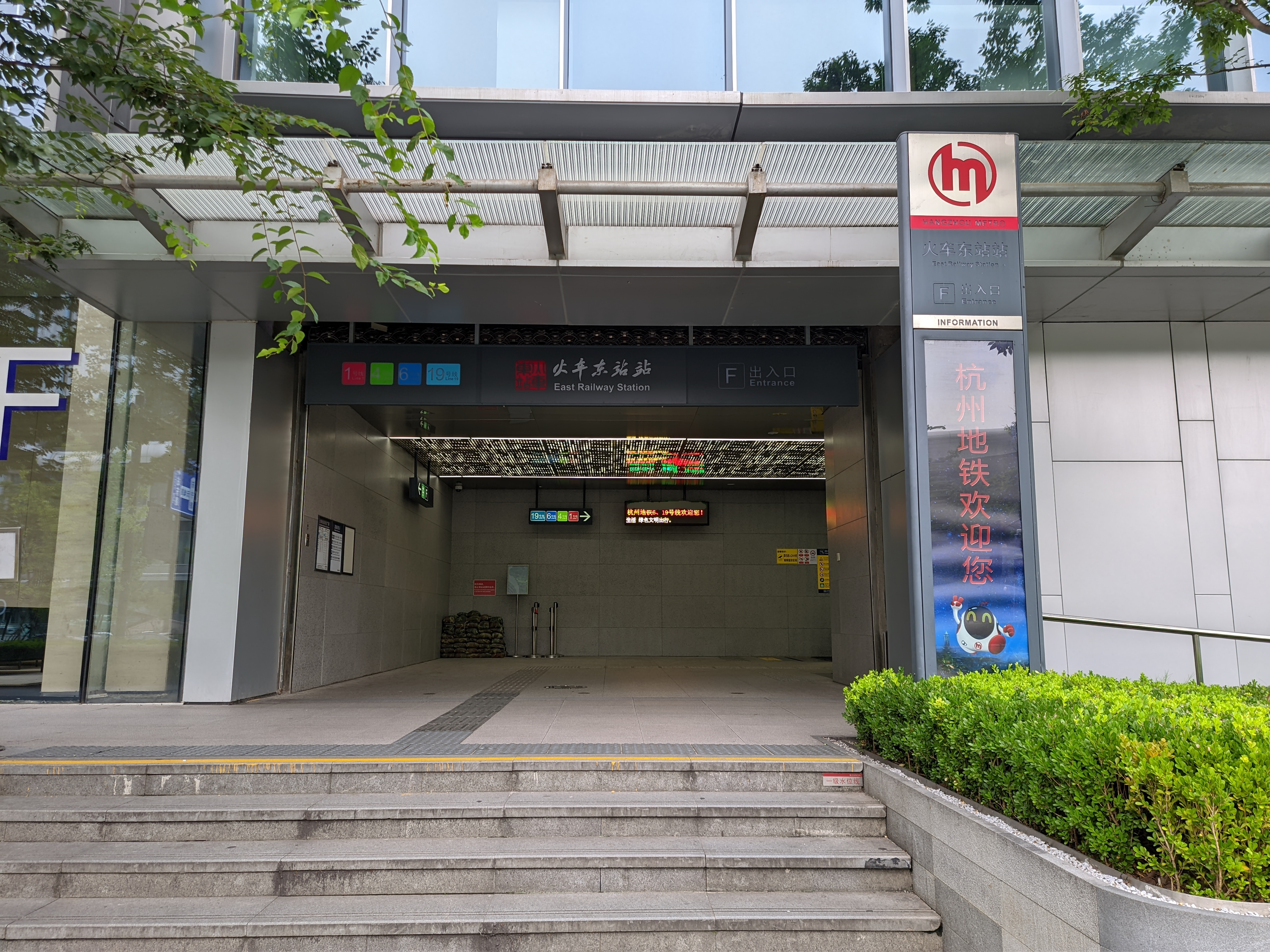
Entrance F, inside the Mixc Enterprise Center

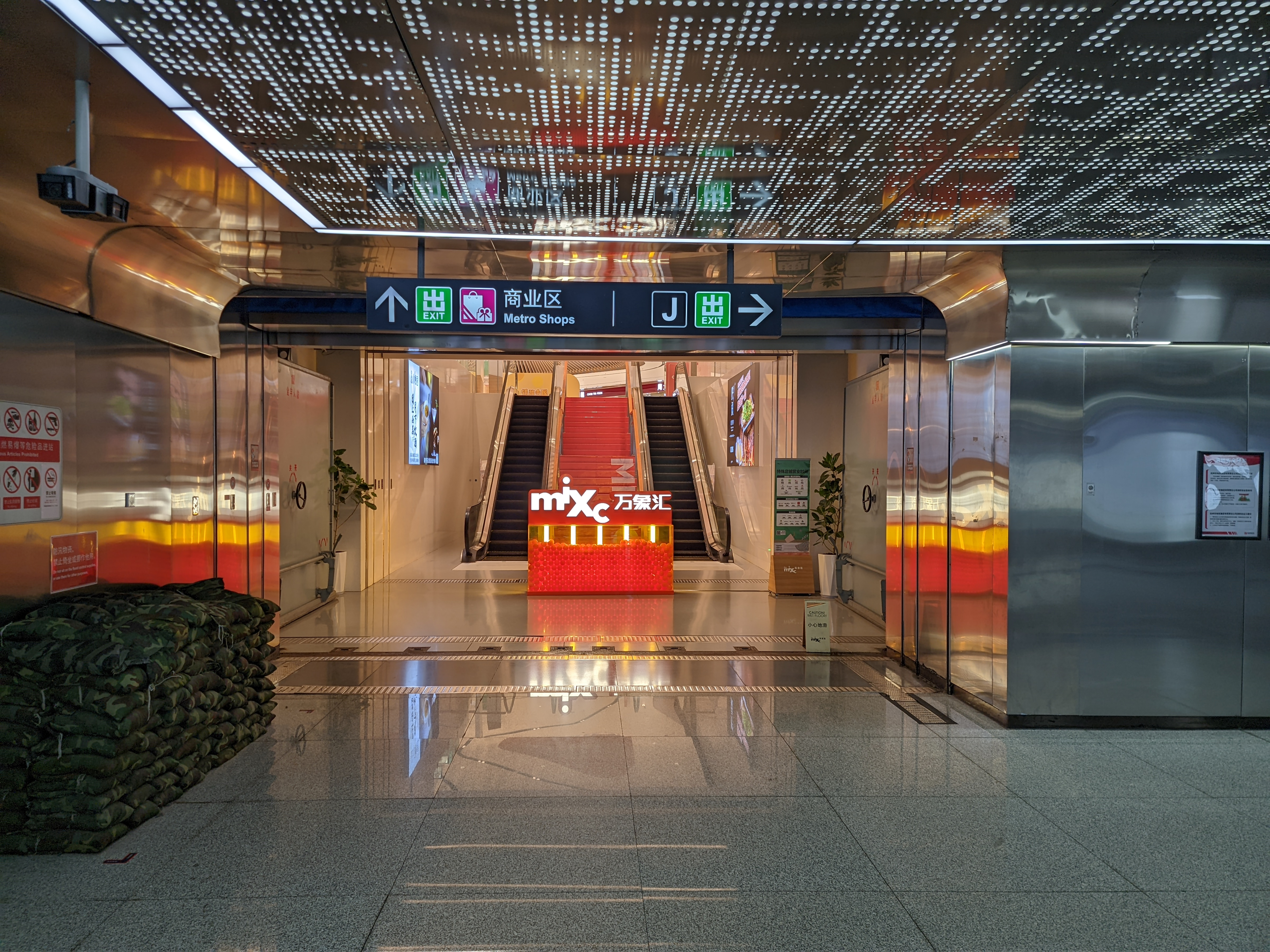
Exit to Hangzhou Dongzhan MIXC ONE
