= Chuangjing Road station =

Metro station in China

Chuangjing Road 创景路
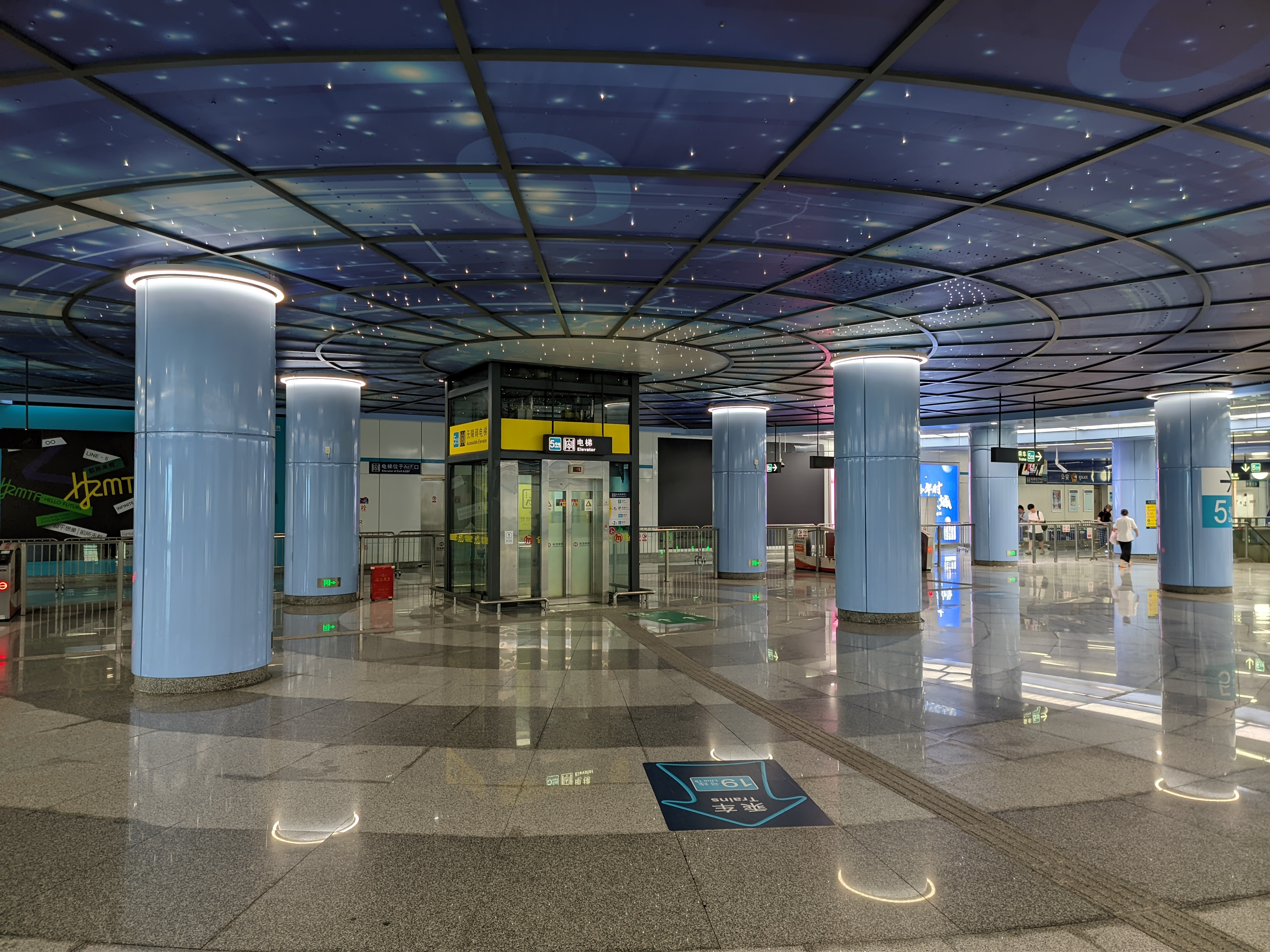
- Concourse

General information
- Location: Yuhang Central Park (Planning); Yuhang District, Hangzhou, Zhejiang; China
- Coordinates: 30°16′50″N 119°59′36″E
- System: Hangzhou metro station
- Operator: Hangzhou MTR Line 5 Corporation; Hangzhou Metro Corporation
- Lines: Line 5 Line 19
- Platforms: 4 (2 island platforms)
- Connections: Underground

Construction
- Structure type: Yes
- Accessible: Yes

History
- Opened: April 23, 2020 (Line 5); September 22, 2022 (Line 19)

Services
Preceding station	Hangzhou Metro	Following station
Gexiang towards East Nanhu	Line 5	Liangmu Road towards Guniangqiao
West Railway Station towards Tiaoxi	Line 19	Haichuangyuan towards Yongsheng Road
Location

Chuangjing Road (simplified Chinese: 创景路; traditional Chinese: 創景路) is a metro station on Line 5 and Line 19 of Hangzhou Metro in China. It is located in Yuhang District of Hangzhou.

== Station layout ==
Chuangjing Road has three levels: a concourse, and separate levels for lines 5 and 19. Each of these consists of an island platform with two tracks.

== Entrances/exits ==
- (Elevator exit): Xiangwang Street
- A2: Xiangwang Street, Chuangming Road
- B2: Ouxiang Street
- B3: Lianchuang Street, Chuangming Road
- C: Chuangjing Road
- D: Chuangjing Road
- E: Yuhang Central Park (Under Construction)
- F: Yuhang Central Park (Under Construction)
- G: Yuhang Central Park (Under Construction)

== Gallery ==
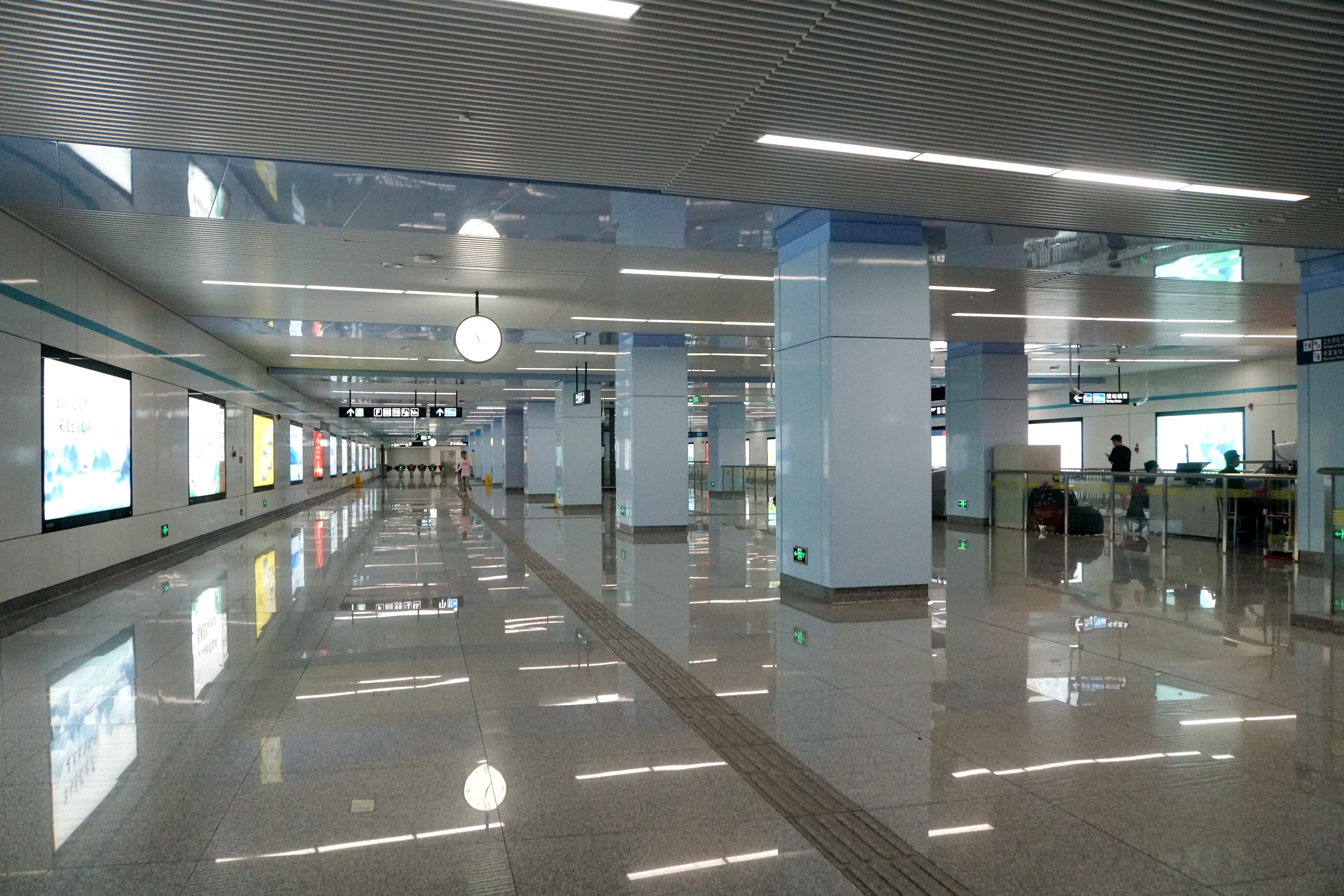
Line 19 concourse

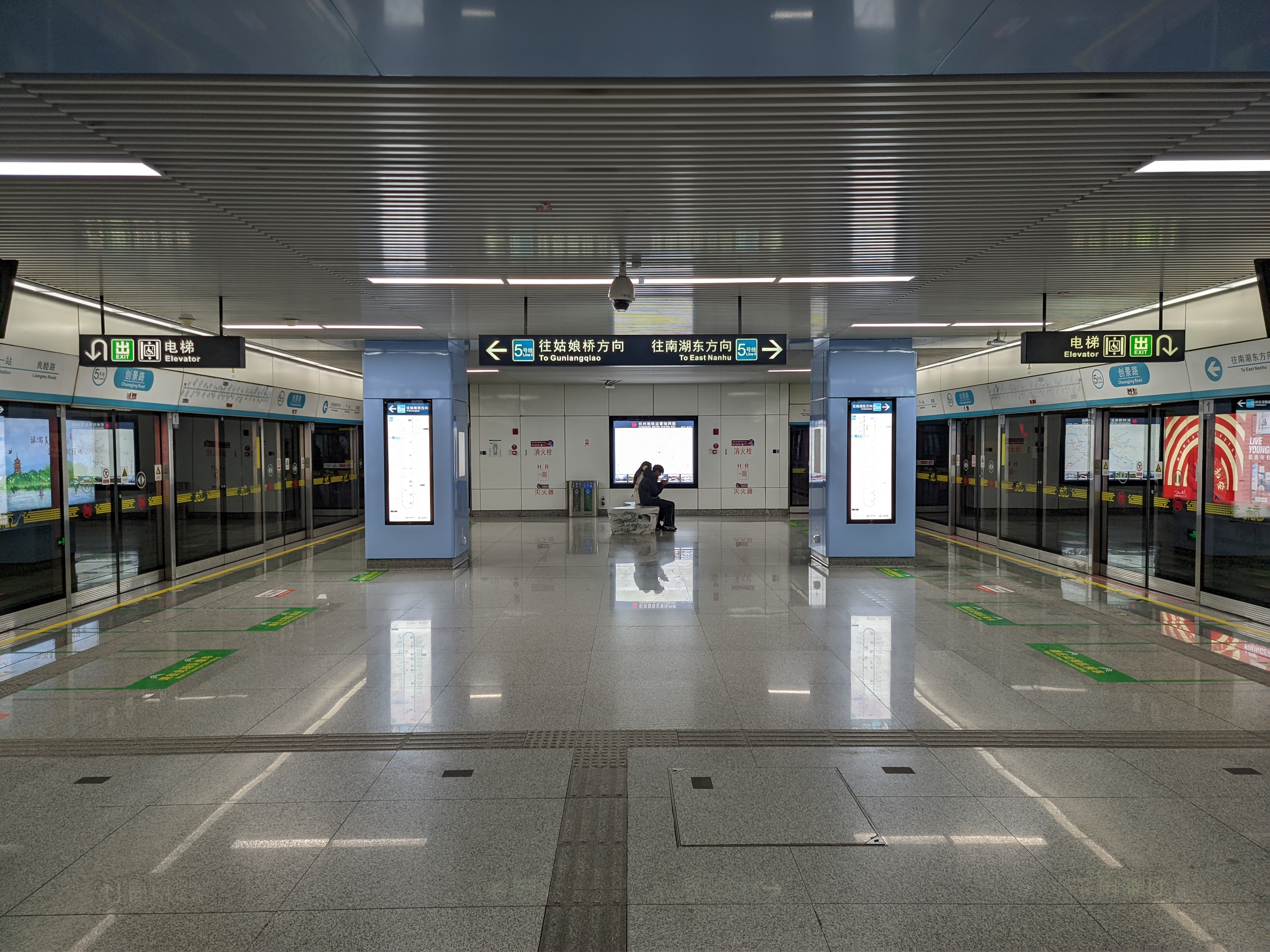
Line 5 platforms

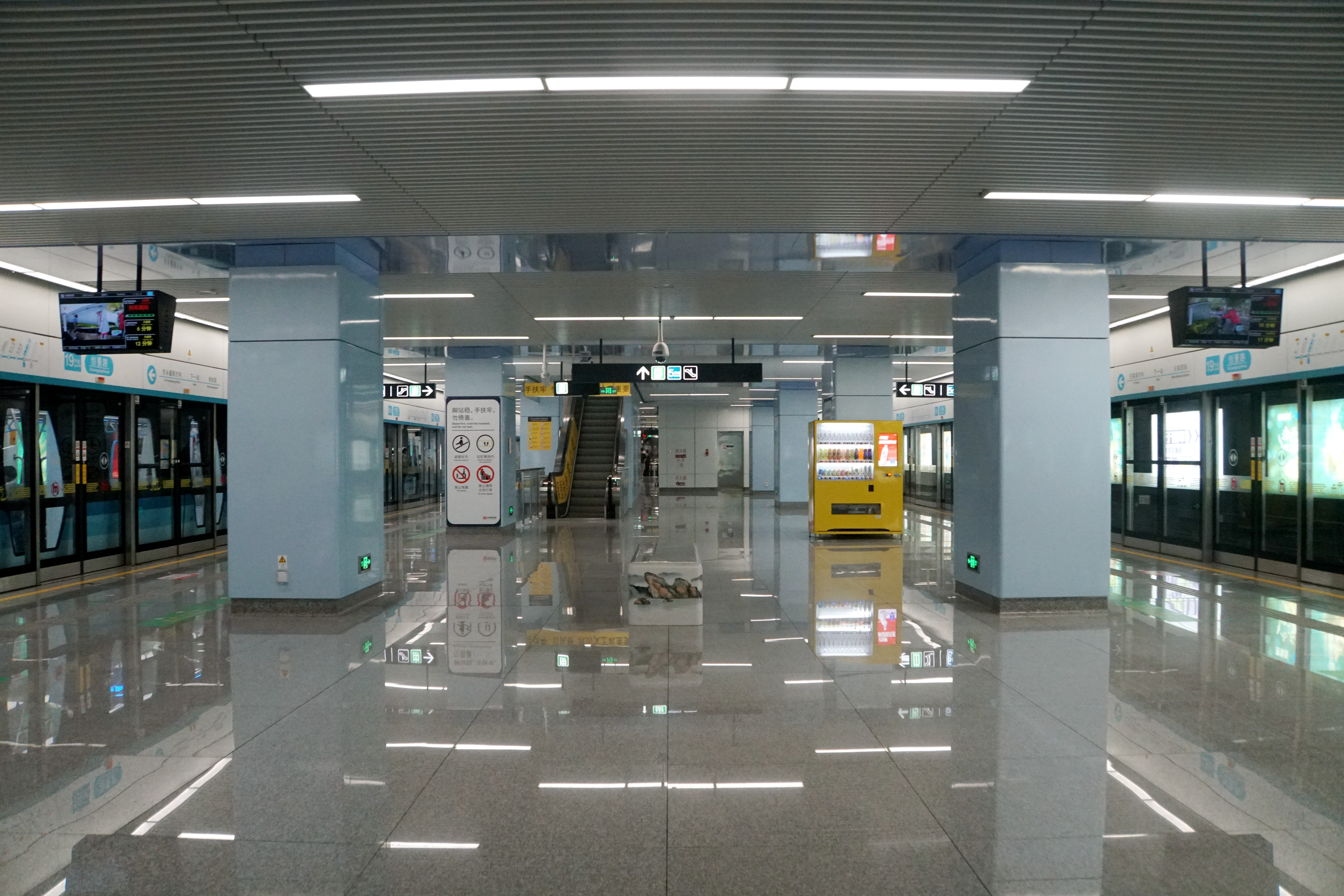
Line 19 platforms

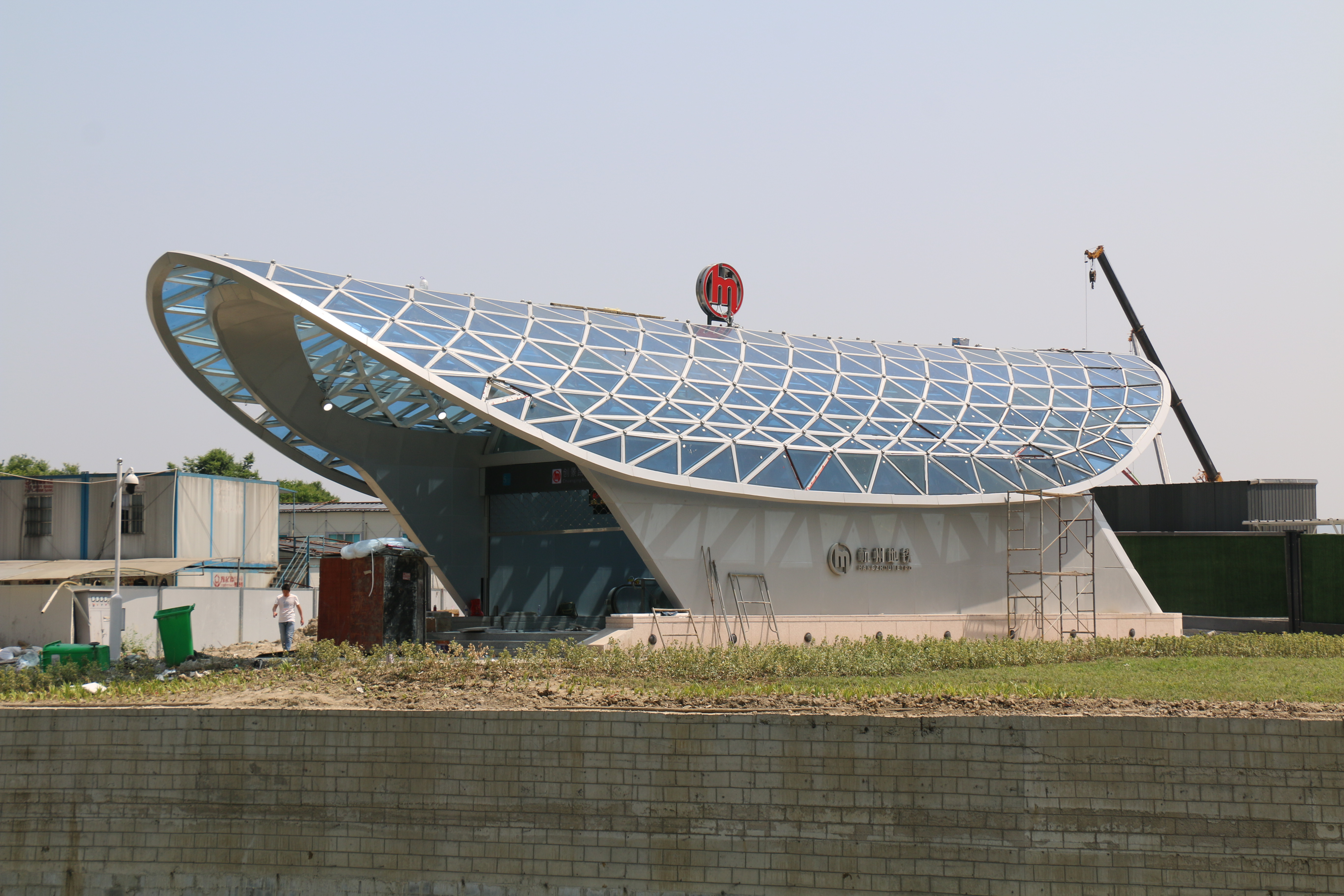
Entrance G
