= Haichuangyuan station =

Metro station in Hangzhou, China

Haichuangyuan 海创园
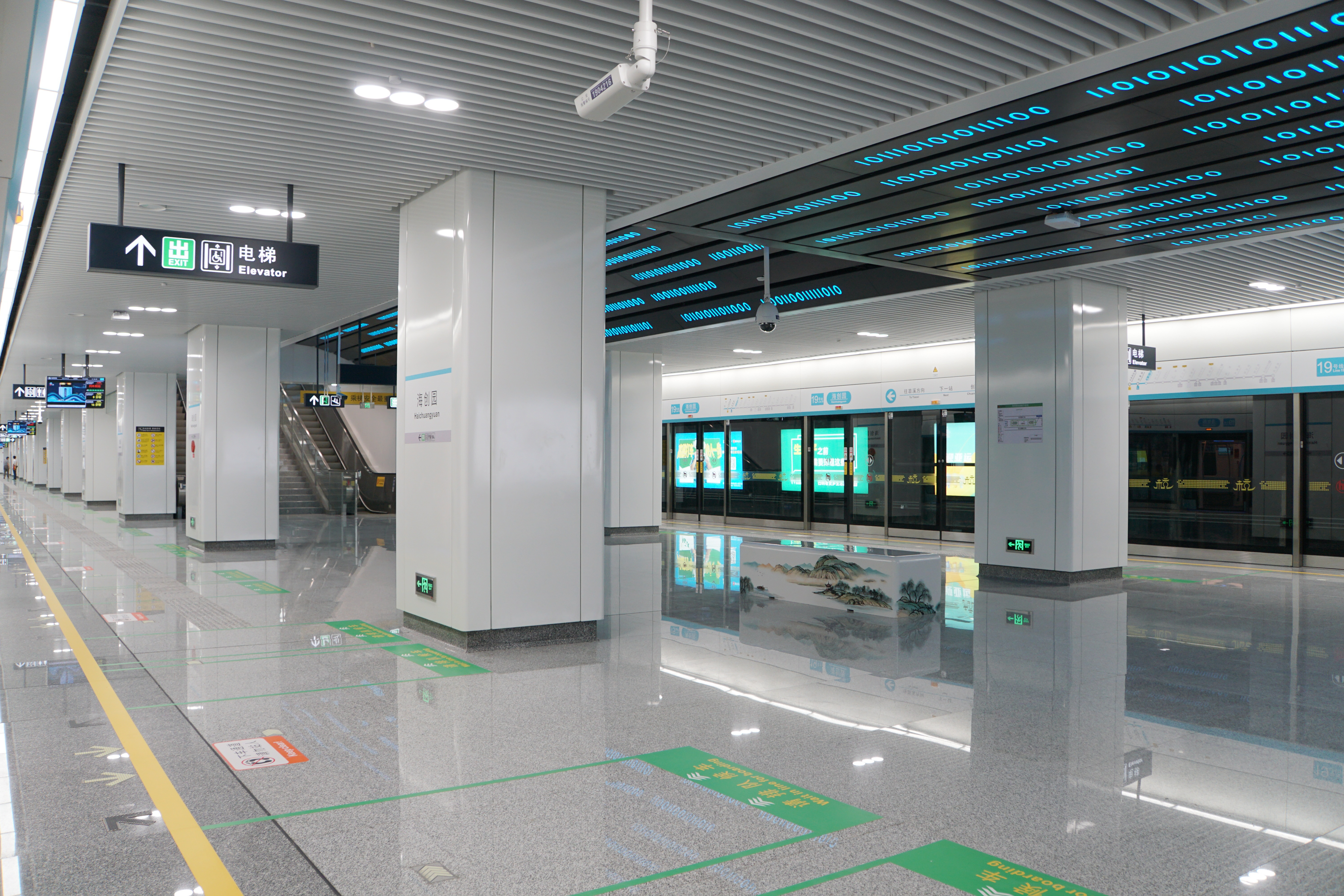
- Platforms of Line 19

General information
- Location: Wenyi Road (W) × Gaojiao Road; Yuhang District, Hangzhou, Zhejiang; China
- Coordinates: 30°16′58″N 120°00′56″E
- System: Hangzhou metro station
- Operator: Hangzhou Metro Corporation
- Lines: Line 12 (U/C); Line 19
- Platforms: 2 (1 island platform)

Construction
- Structure type: Underground
- Accessible: Yes

History
- Opened: 22 September 2022

Services
Preceding station	Hangzhou Metro	Following station
North Shuixiang towards Shuangpu Depot	Line 12 Under Construction	Cangqian Campus, Hangzhou Normal University towards West Railway Station
Chuangjing Road towards Tiaoxi	Line 19	North Xixi Wetland towards Yongsheng Road
Location

Haichuangyuan (simplified Chinese: 海创园; traditional Chinese: 海創園; lit. 'Overseas High-level Talents Innovation Park') is a metro station of Line 19 of the Hangzhou Metro in China. It is located in Yuhang District of Hangzhou. The station was opened on 22 September 2022. It will be an interchange station of Line 12 and Line 19.

== Station layout ==
Haichuangyuan has two levels: a concourse, and an island platform with two tracks for line 19. An underground metro shopping street is located at the south of concourse.

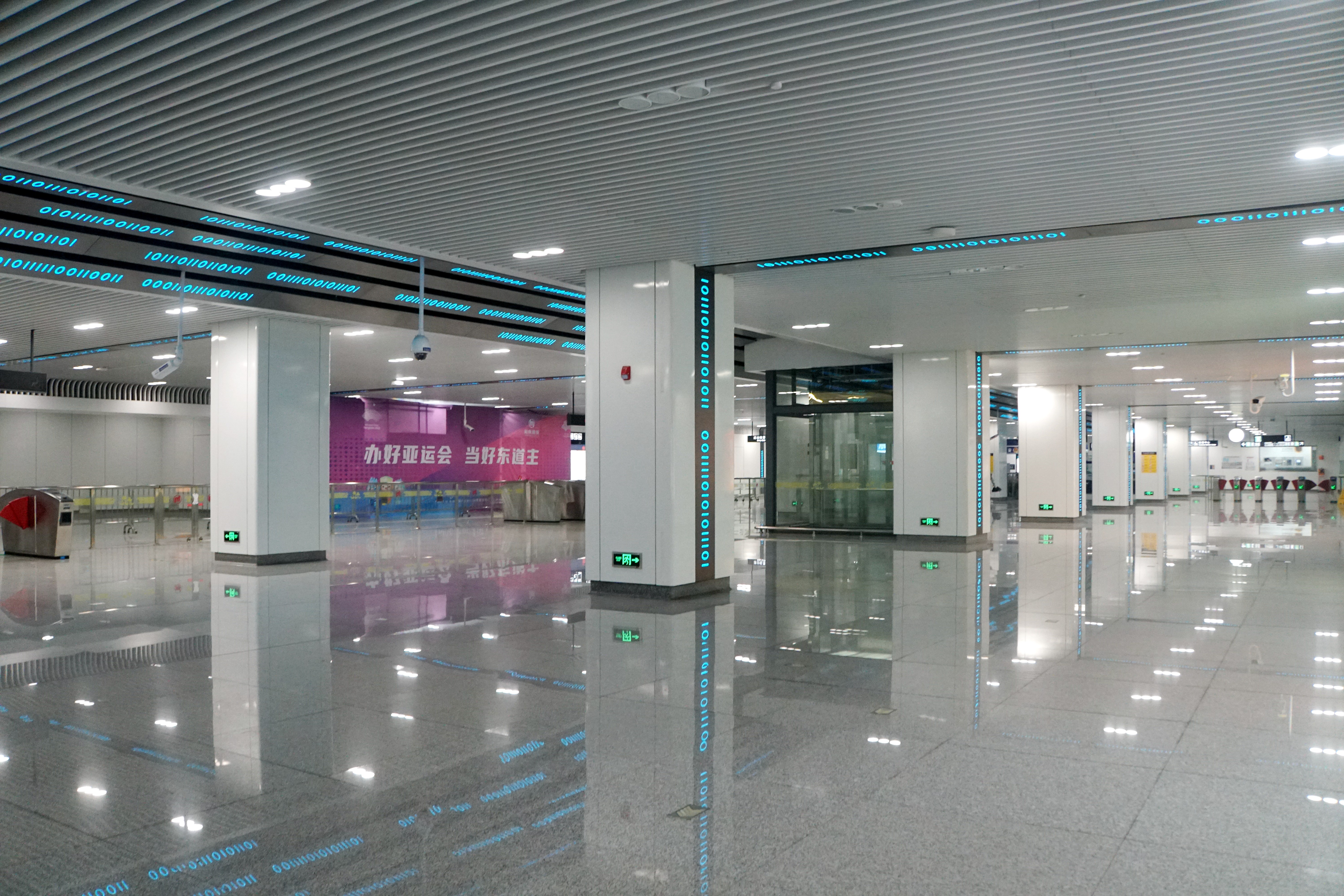
Concourse

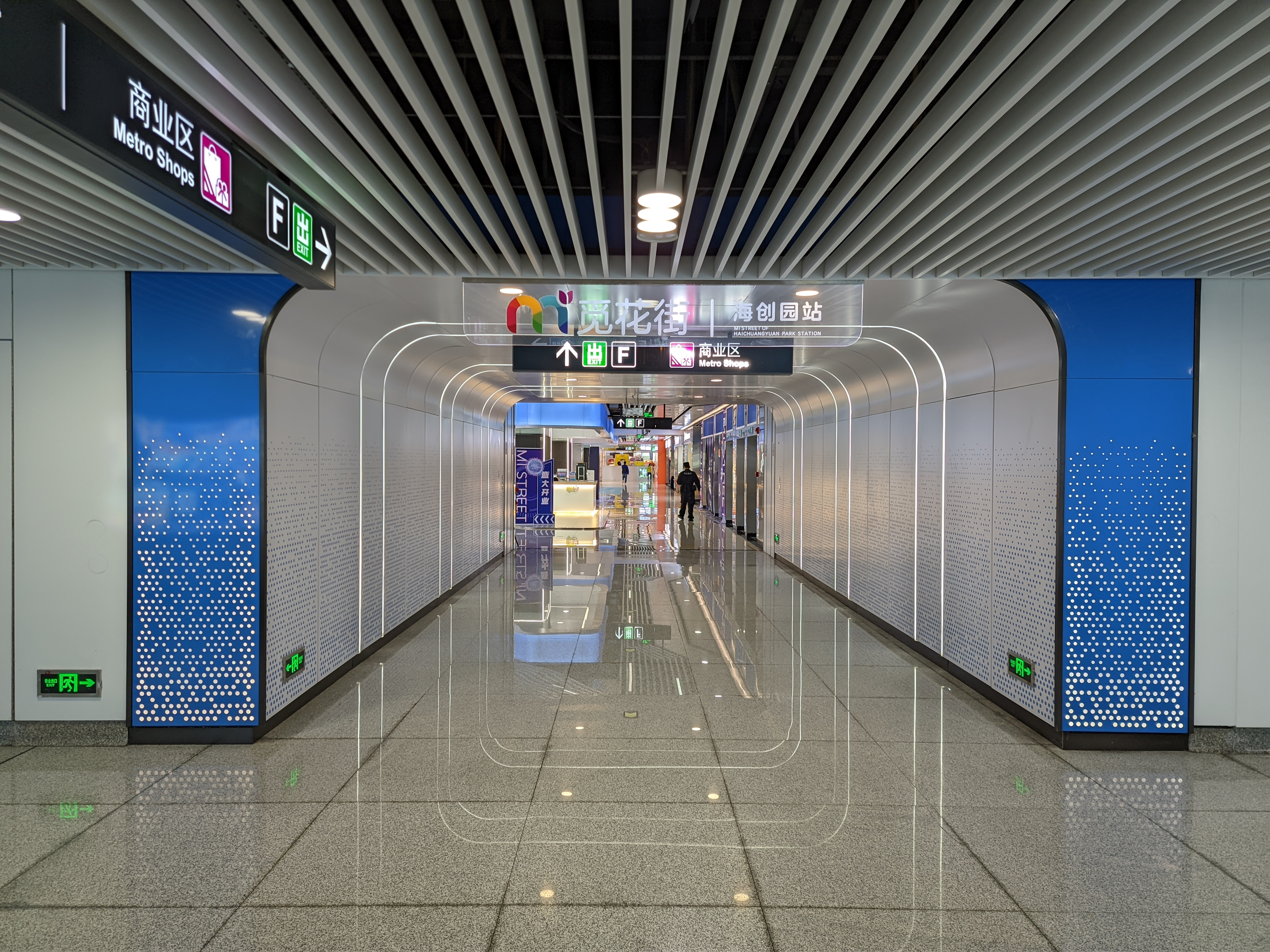
Metro shops (from the pathway of exit E)

== Entrances/exits ==
- A: Zone C, Alibaba Xixi Campus
- D: Zhejiang Overseas High-level Talents Innovation Park
- E: Langyueju Community
- F: Zone A, Alibaba Xixi Campus
