= North Xixi Wetland station =

Metro station in Hangzhou, China

North Xixi Wetland 西溪湿地北
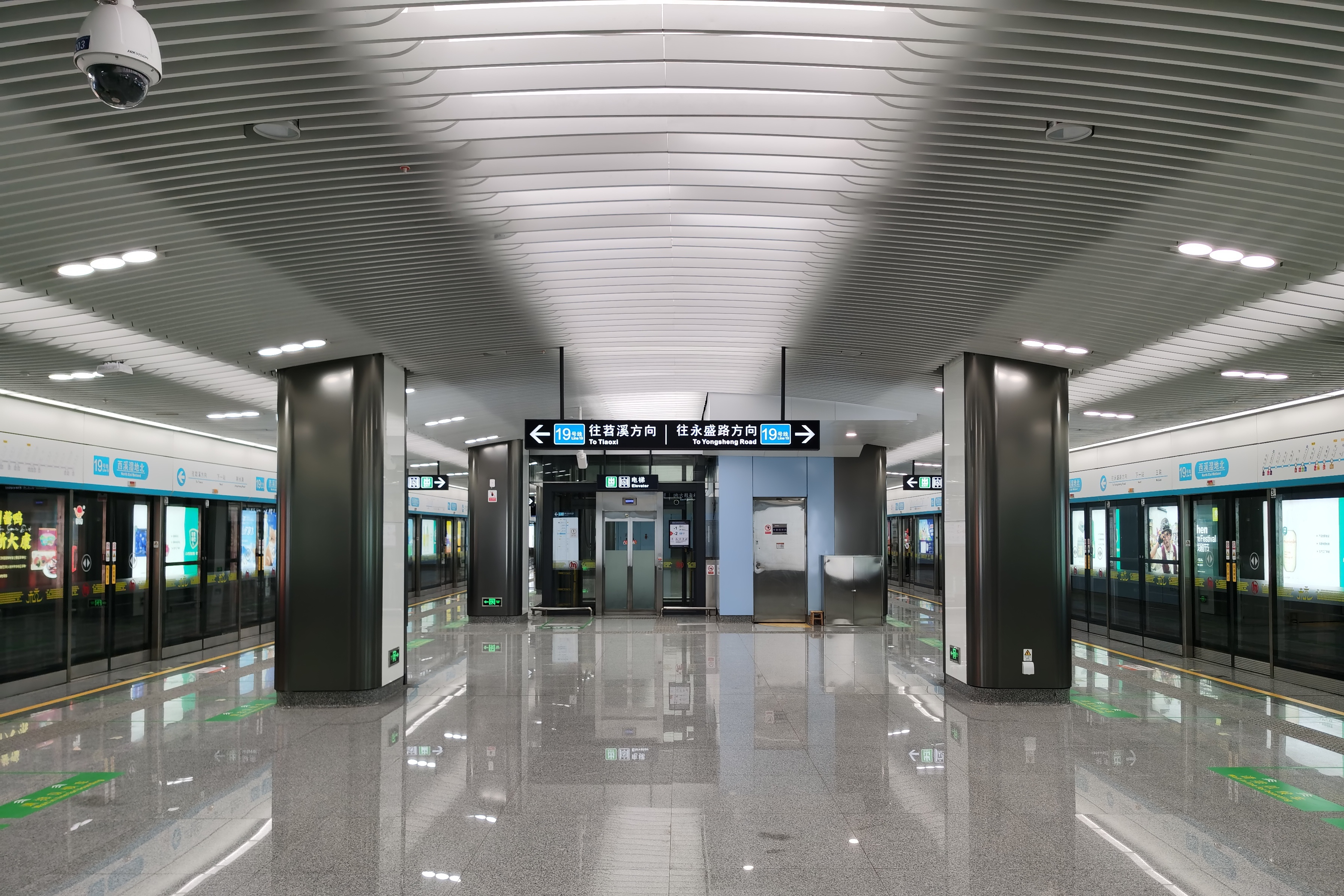
- Platforms

General information
- Location: Jiangdun Road × Wen'er Road (W); Xihu District, Hangzhou, Zhejiang; China
- Coordinates: 30°17′02″N 120°03′55″E
- System: Hangzhou metro station
- Operator: Hangzhou Metro Corporation
- Line: Line 19
- Platforms: 2 (1 island platform)

Construction
- Structure type: Underground
- Accessible: Yes

History
- Opened: 22 September 2022

Services
| Preceding station | Hangzhou Metro | Following station |
|---|---|---|
| Haichuangyuan towards Tiaoxi | Line 19 | Wulian towards Yongsheng Road |
Location

North Xixi Wetland (simplified Chinese: 西溪湿地北; traditional Chinese: 西溪濕地北) is a metro station of Line 19 of the Hangzhou Metro in China. It is located in Xihu District of Hangzhou. The station was opened on 22 September 2022.

== Station layout ==
North Xixi Wetland has two levels: a concourse, and an island platform with two tracks for line 19.

== Entrances/exits ==
- A: Ziyun Street
- C: Yunlangu Business Center
- D: Xixi One
- E1: north side of Wen'er Road (W), east side of Jiangdun Road
- E2: Xixi National Wetland Park
- F: north side of Wen'er Road (W), Hongde Road
