= Hangzhou West railway station =

Railway station in Yuhang District, Hangzhou

Coordinates: 30.3004°N 119.9817°E

Hangzhou West 杭州西
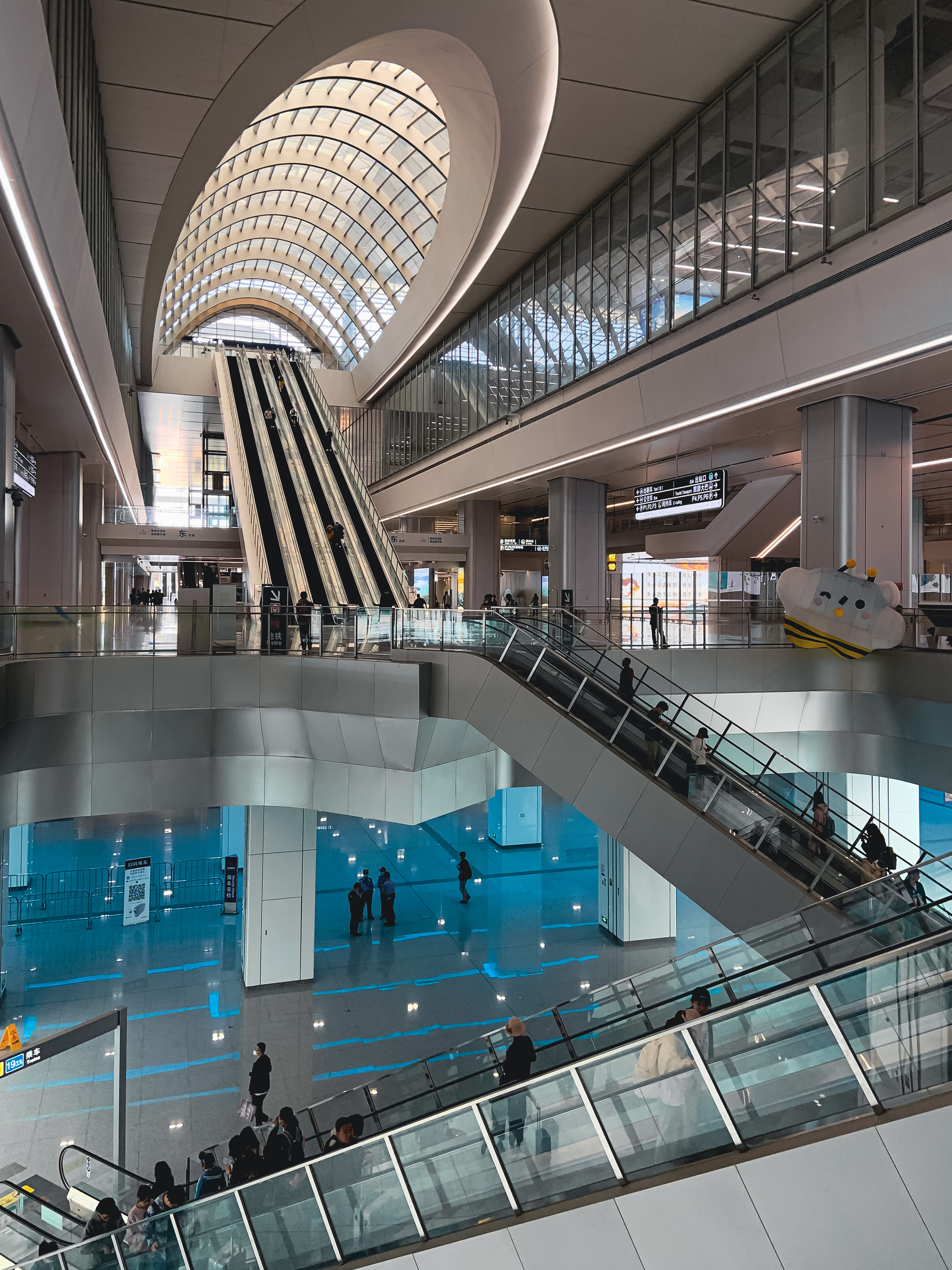
- East entrance

General information
- Location: Cangqian Subdistrict, Yuhang District, Hangzhou, Zhejiang; China
- Operator: China Railway Shanghai Group, China Railway Corporation
- Lines: Shangqiu–Hefei–Hangzhou high-speed railway (Huzhou–Hangzhou section); Hangzhou–Wenzhou high-speed railway (U/C); Line 3; Line 19
- Platforms: 11

History
- Opened: 22 September 2022

Services
Preceding station	China Railway High-speed	Following station
Deqing towards Shangqiu	Shangqiu–Hangzhou high-speed railway	Fuyang West towards Tonglu
Preceding station	Hangzhou Metro	Following station
Wushanqiancun towards Wushanqiancun or Shima	Line 3	North Longzhou Road towards Xingqiao
Tiaoxi Terminus	Line 19	Chuangjing Road towards Yongsheng Road
Location
- Location within Zhejiang Location within China

Hangzhou West railway station (Chinese: 杭州西站; pinyin: Hángzhōu Xīzhàn) is a railway station located in Cangqian Subdistrict, Yuhang District, Hangzhou, Zhejiang Province, China. The station was opened on 22 September 2022.

It is served by Shangqiu–Hangzhou high-speed railway (Huzhou–Hangzhou section) and will be served by Hangzhou–Wenzhou high-speed railway.

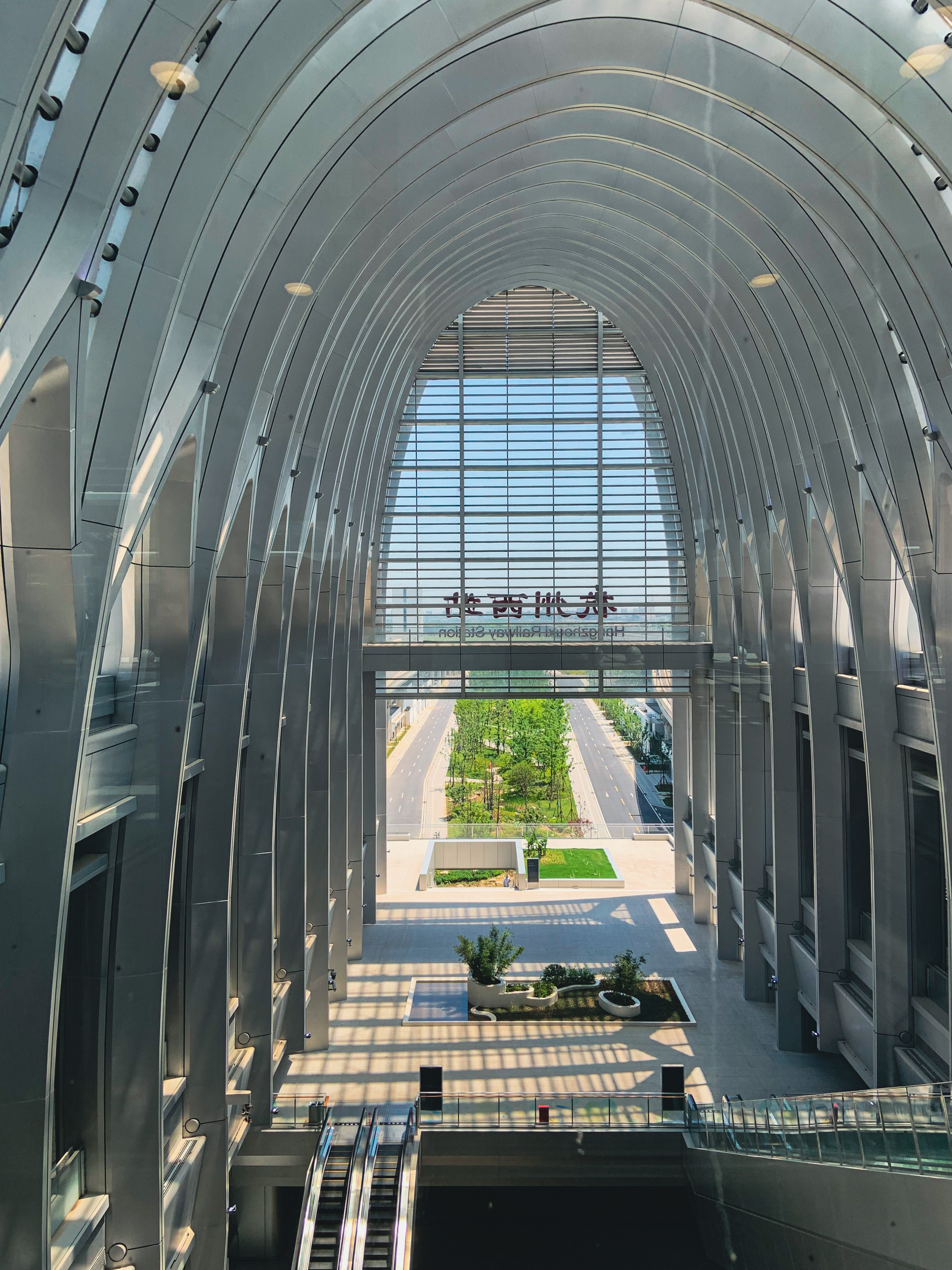
Station interior

Hangzhou West railway station is the third largest transport hub in Hangzhou after Hangzhou Xiaoshan International Airport and Hangzhou East railway station.

== Construction ==
Construction began on 17 September 2019. It is part of the infrastructure preparations for the 2022 Asian Games. The budget for the construction is 15 billion yuan ($2.25 billion). It was opened on 22 September 2022.

== Transportation ==
=== Metro station ===
Hangzhou West railway station is served by Line 3 and Line 19 of the Hangzhou Metro. The metro station also opened on 22 September 2022.

=== Bus ===
There are two bus stops serving Hangzhou West railway station.

- Stop 1: West Railway Station (火车西站)

Bus Routes: 349, 592, 599B, 8203

- Stop 2: West Railway Station [W] (火车西站西）

Bus Routes: 420, 7497

== See also ==
- Hangzhou railway station
- Hangzhou South railway station
- Hangzhou East railway station

Preceding station	China Railway High-speed	Following station
Deqing towards Shangqiu	Shangqiu–Hangzhou high-speed railway	Fuyang West towards Tonglu
