= Line 19 (Hangzhou Metro) =

Metro line of the Hangzhou Metro system in China

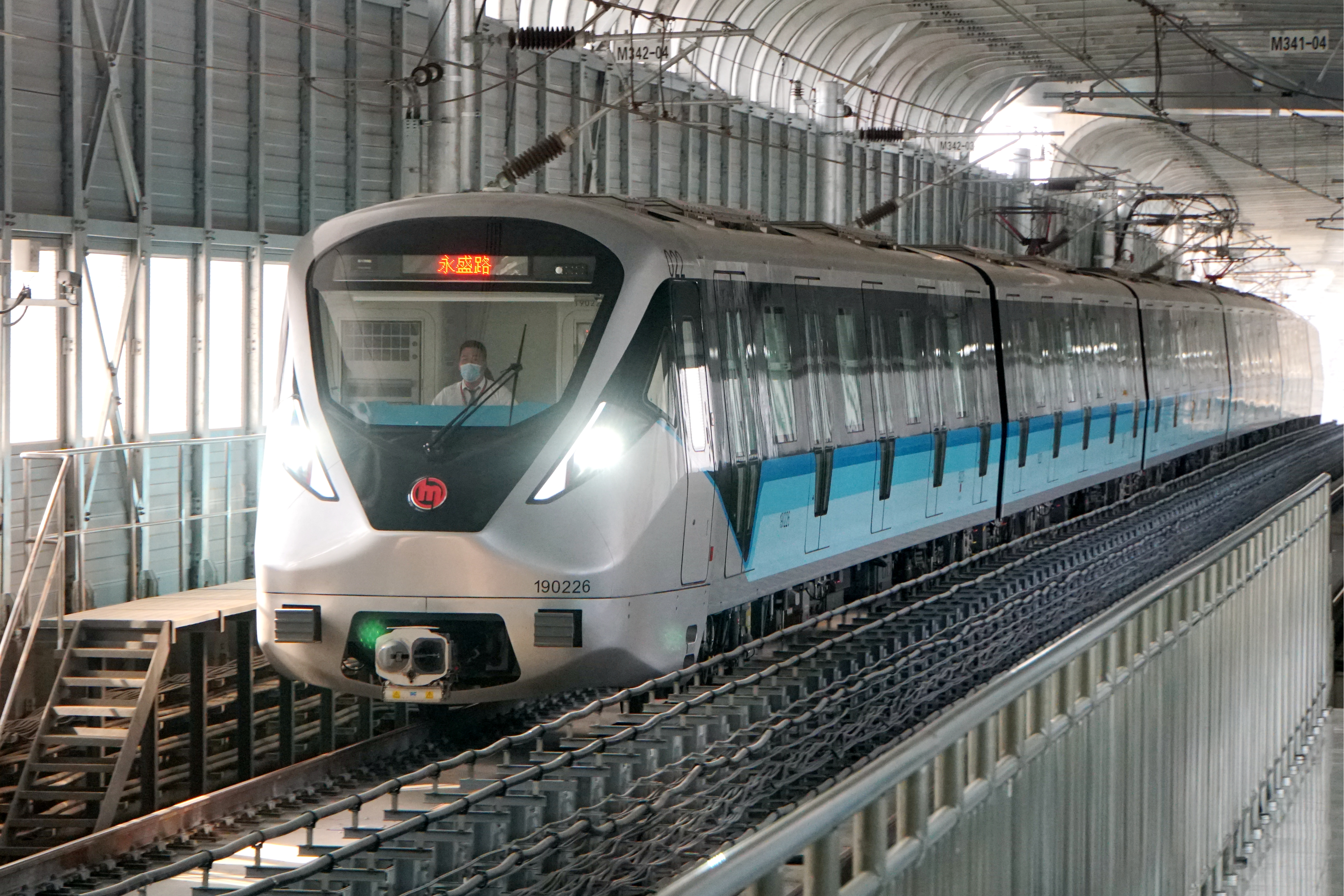
- Line 19 train

Overview
- Other name(s): Central Express; Airport Express; Line K1; Line 31
- Status: Partially in operation: Closed between Pinglan Road and Yongsheng Road (inclusive) for the installation of noise barriers
- Owner: City of Hangzhou
- Locale: Hangzhou, Zhejiang, China
- Termini: Tiaoxi; Yongsheng Road
- Stations: 18 (14 in operation)

Service
- Type: Rapid transit
- System: Hangzhou Metro
- Services: 1
- Operator: Hangzhou Metro Corporation
- Depot(s): Cangqian Depot; Jingjiang Stabling Yard
- Rolling stock: PM179

History
- Opened: September 22, 2022; 3 years ago

Technical
- Line length: 59.14 kilometres (36.75 mi)
- Character: Underground & Elevated
- Track gauge: 1,435 mm (4 ft 8 1/2 in)
- Electrification: Overhead, 1500 V DC
- Operating speed: 120 km/h (75 mph) (maximum speed)

Line 19 of the Hangzhou Metro (Chinese: 杭州地铁19号线; pinyin: Hángzhōu dìtiě shíjiǔ hào xiàn) (Note: Formerly known as Central Express line, Airport Express line, Line K1 or Line 31 during planning or construction. The only official name after it started operation is Line 19.) is a rapid transit line in Hangzhou, China. The line was opened on 22 September 2022. It is the longest metro line in Hangzhou Metro.

== Description ==
The line has a length of 59.14 km (36.75 mi), including 47.1 km (29.3 mi) underground section. There are 17 stations on the line, including 13 underground stations and 4 elevated stations. The line uses 6-car Type A rolling stock.

It connects Hangzhou West railway station, Alibaba headquarters, Hangzhou East railway station and Hangzhou Xiaoshan International Airport. The termini are Tiaoxi station and Yongsheng Road station. It crosses the Qiantang River on a rebuilt Road–Railway Bridge with the Konggang Elevated Road (originally S2 Hangzhou–Ningbo Expressway).

== Opening timeline ==
Segment	Commencement	Length	Station(s)	Name
West Railway Station — Yongsheng Road	22 September 2022	59.14 km (37 mi)	13	
Wensan Road	21 February 2023	59.14 km (37 mi)	1	
Wulian, Yicheng Road	30 November 2023	-	2	Infill stations
Jingchang Road	30 June 2025	-	1	Infill station

== Stations ==
To scale map of Line 19 (Hangzhou Metro)

Station name		Connections	Location
English	Chinese	Connections	Location
Tiaoxi	苕溪		Yuhang
West Railway Station	火车西站	3 Hangzhou West	Yuhang
Chuangjing Road	创景路	5	Yuhang
Haichuangyuan	海创园		Yuhang
Jingchang Road	荆长路		Yuhang
North Xixi Wetland	西溪湿地北		Xihu
Wulian	五联		Xihu
Wensan Road	文三路	10	Xihu
Shentangqiao	沈塘桥	2	Xihu
West Lake Cultural Square	西湖文化广场	1 3	Gongshu
Yicheng Road	驿城路		Shangcheng
East Railway Station (East Square)	火车东站（东广场）	6; 1 (Note: Out-of-station interchange with East Railway Station) 4 Hangzhou East	Shangcheng
Yudao	御道	9	Shangcheng
Pinglan Road	平澜路		Xiaoshan
Gengwen Road	耕文路		Xiaoshan
Zhixing Road	知行路		Xiaoshan
Xiaoshan International Airport	萧山国际机场	1 7 HGH	Xiaoshan
Yongsheng Road	永盛路	7	Xiaoshan

== Rolling stock ==
Stock	Class	Year built	Builder	Number built	Numbers	Formation	Depots	Line assigned	Notes
PM179	A (Express train)	2021-2023	CRRC Nanjing Puzhen	270 (45 sets)	19 001 - 19 045 (190011-190456)	Tc+Mp+M+M+Mp+Tc	Cangqian Depot; Jingjiang Yard	19	

== See also ==
- Hangzhou Metro
