= Tiaoxi station =

Metro station in Hangzhou, China

Tiaoxi 苕溪

General information
- Location: Yuhang District, Hangzhou, Zhejiang; China
- Coordinates: 30.3244°N 119.9546°E
- Operated by: Hangzhou Metro Corporation
- Line: Line 19
- Platforms: 2 (1 island platform)

Services
Preceding station	Hangzhou Metro	Following station
Terminus	Line 19	West Railway Station towards Yongsheng Road
Location

Tiaoxi (Chinese: 苕溪) is a metro station of Line 19 of the Hangzhou Metro in China. It is located in Yuhang District of Hangzhou. Because of lacking external links, it is not in service up to now. It is the western terminus of Line 19, all trains need to drive to this station blankly to turn back after arriving West Railway Station.
