= Yongsheng Road station =

Metro station in Xiaoshan, Hangzhou

Yongsheng Road 永盛路
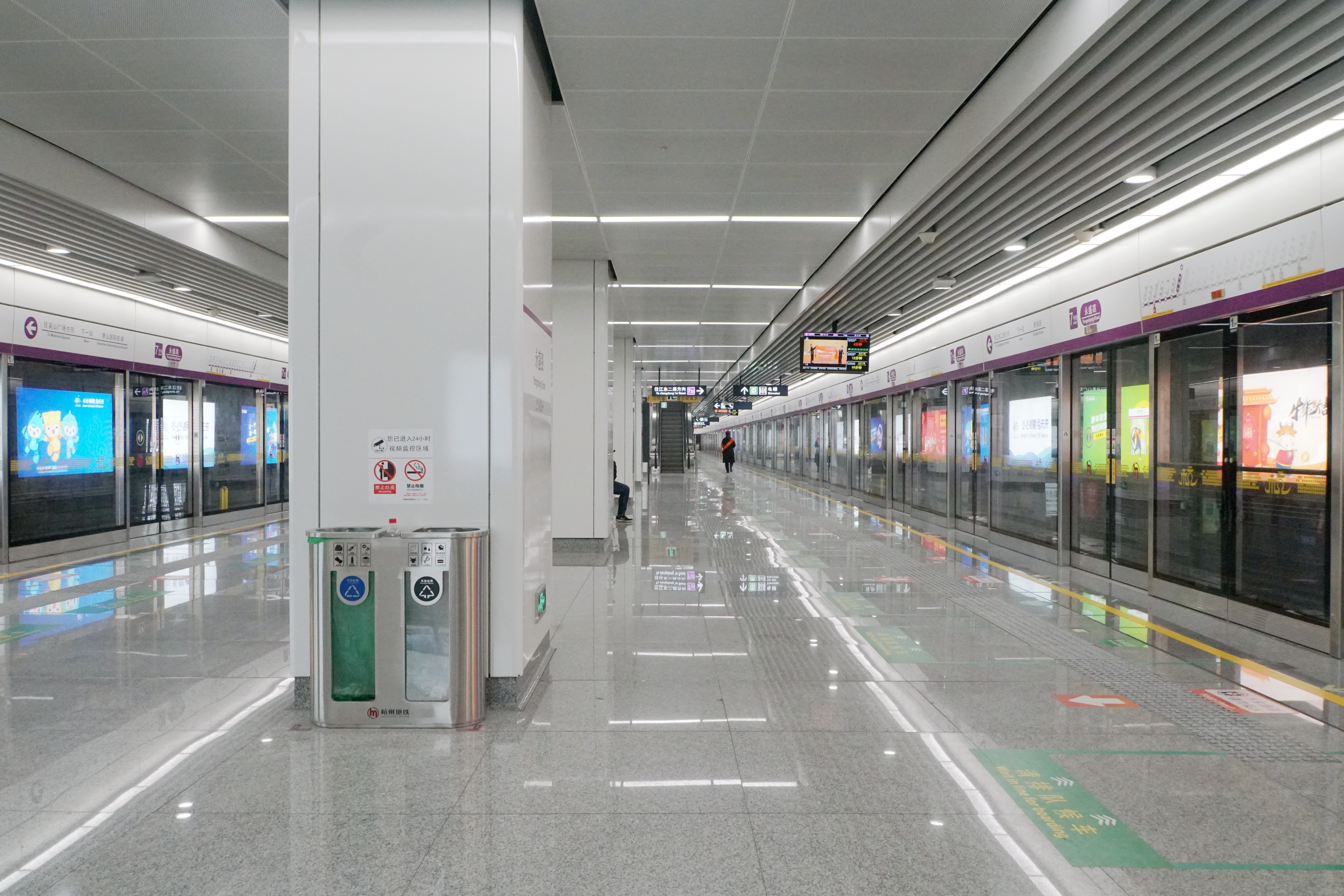
- Line 7 platform

General information
- Location: Xiaoshan District, Hangzhou, Zhejiang; China
- Operator: Hangzhou Metro Corporation
- Lines: Line 7 Line 19
- Platforms: 4 (2 island platforms)

History
- Opened: 30 December 2020; 5 years ago (Line 7); 22 September 2022; 4 years ago (Line 19)

Services
Preceding station	Hangzhou Metro	Following station
Xiaoshan International Airport towards Wushan Square	Line 7	Xinzhen Road towards Jiangdong'er Road
Xiaoshan International Airport towards Tiaoxi	Line 19	Terminus
Location

Yongsheng Road (Chinese: 永盛路) is a metro station on Line 7 and Line 19 of Hangzhou Metro in China. Opened on 30 December 2020, it is located in Xiaoshan District of Hangzhou.
