= Cangbeicun station =

Hangzhou Metro station in Zhejiang, China

Cangbeicun 仓北村
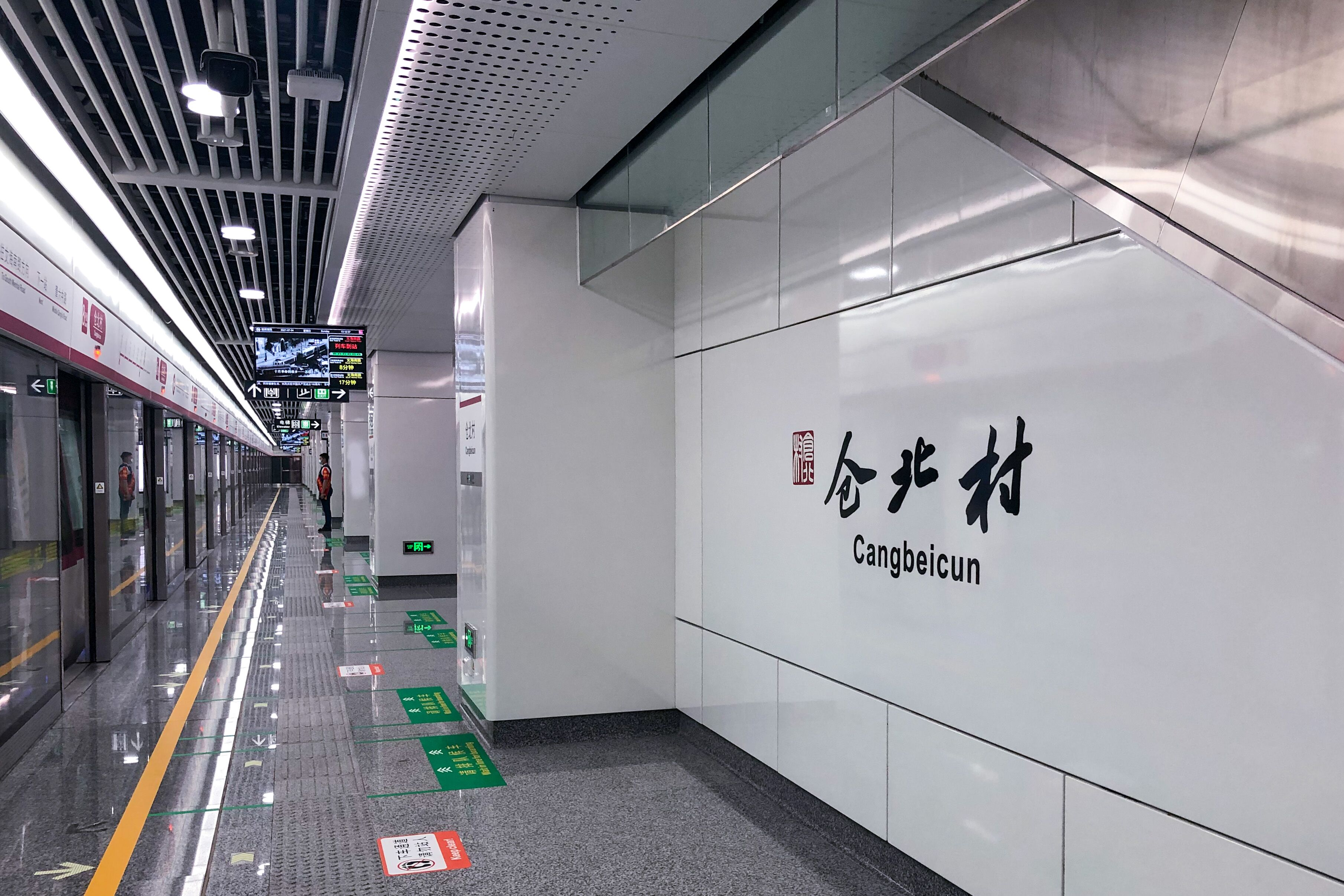

General information
- Location: Qiantang District, Hangzhou, Zhejiang; China
- Coordinates: 30.29634°N 120.50357°E
- Operated by: Hangzhou Metro Corporation
- Line: Line 8

Other information
- Station code: CBC

History
- Opened: 28 June 2021

Services
Preceding station	Hangzhou Metro	Following station
Middle Qingliu Road towards South Wenhai Road	Line 8	Fengloucun towards Xinwan Road
Location

Cangbeicun (Chinese: 仓北村) is a metro station on Line 8 of the Hangzhou Metro in China. It was opened on 28 June 2021, together with the Line 8. It is located in the Qiantang District of Hangzhou, near the Cangbei Village.

== Gallery ==
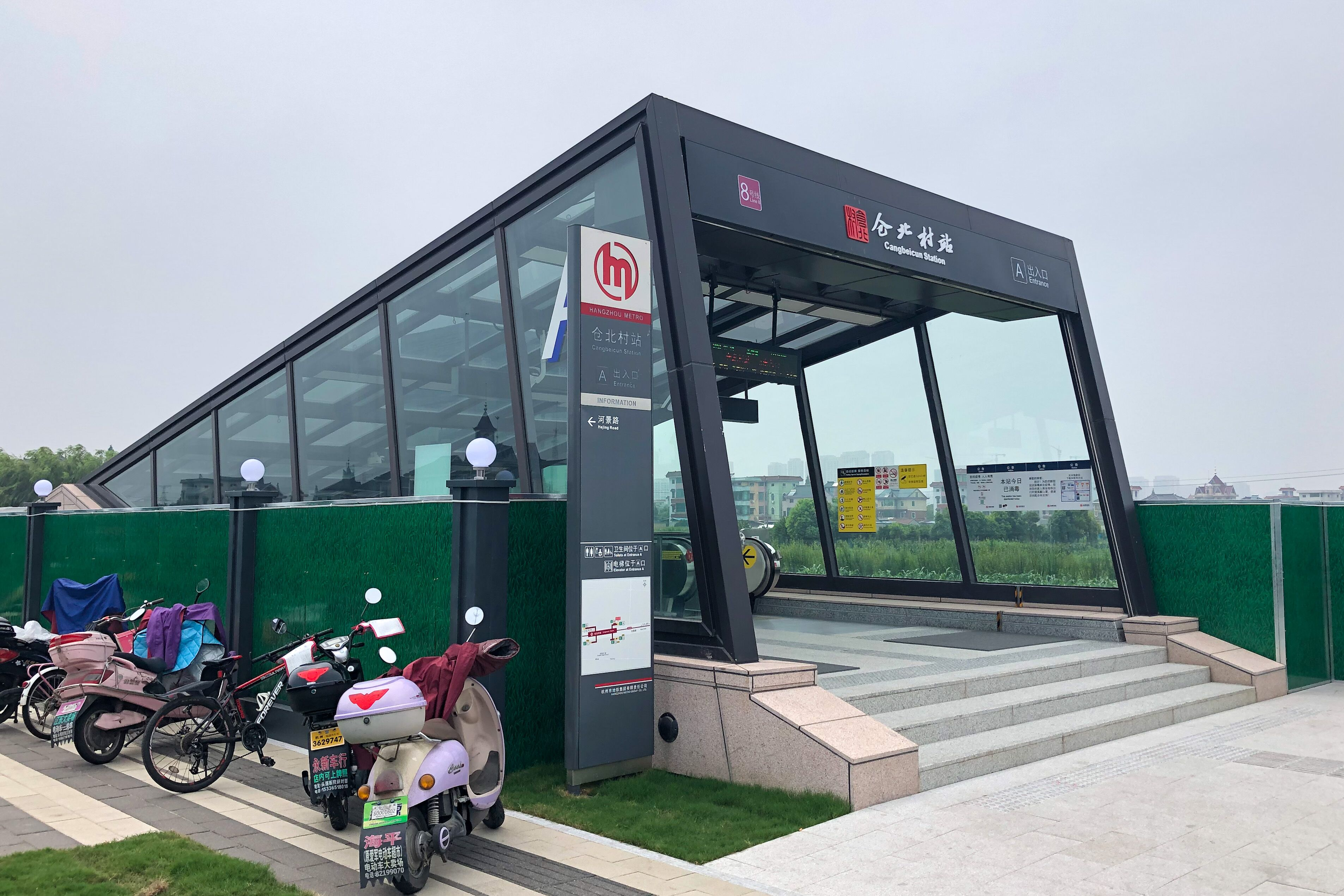
Entrance A

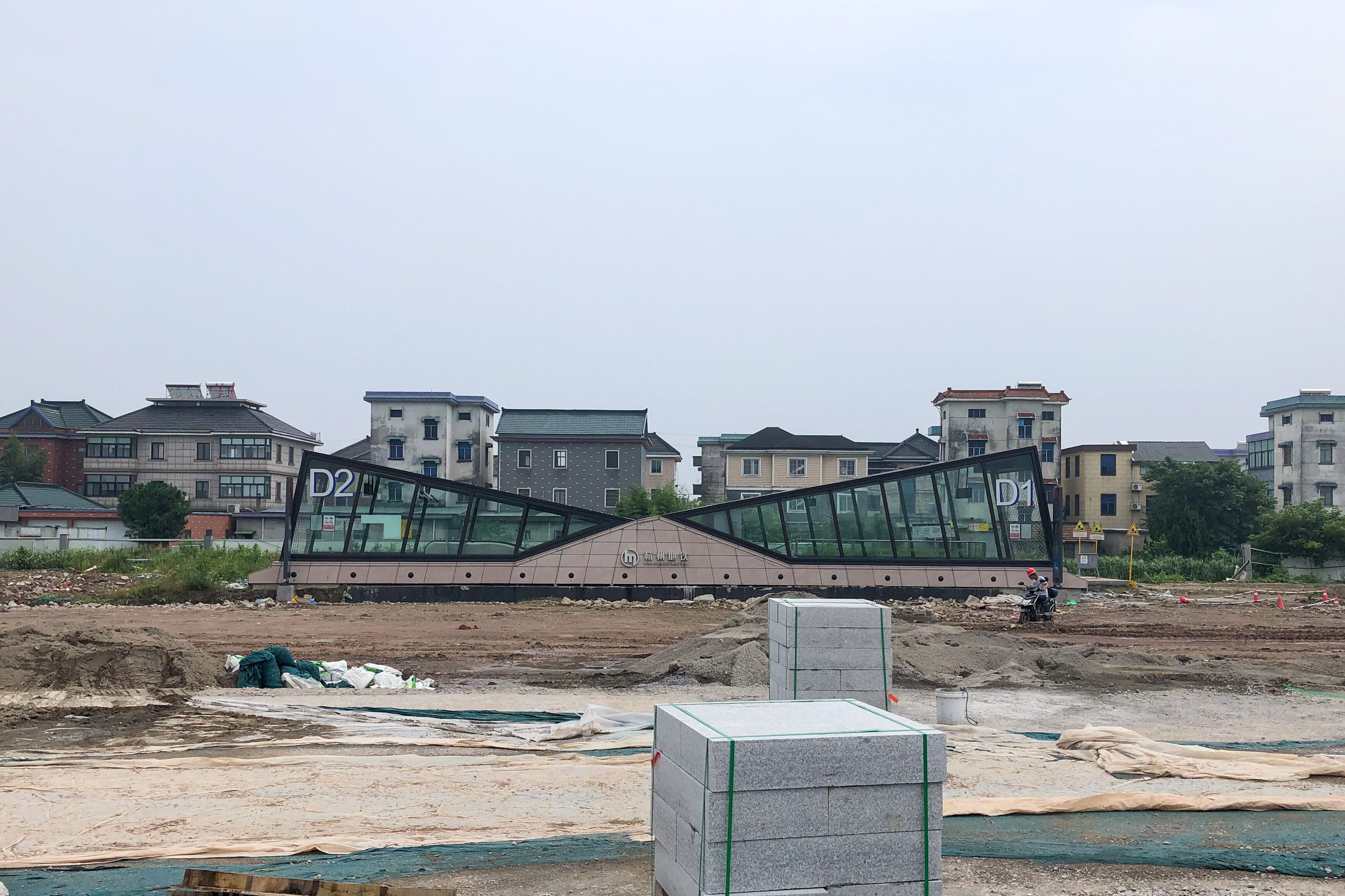
Entrance D looking from outside

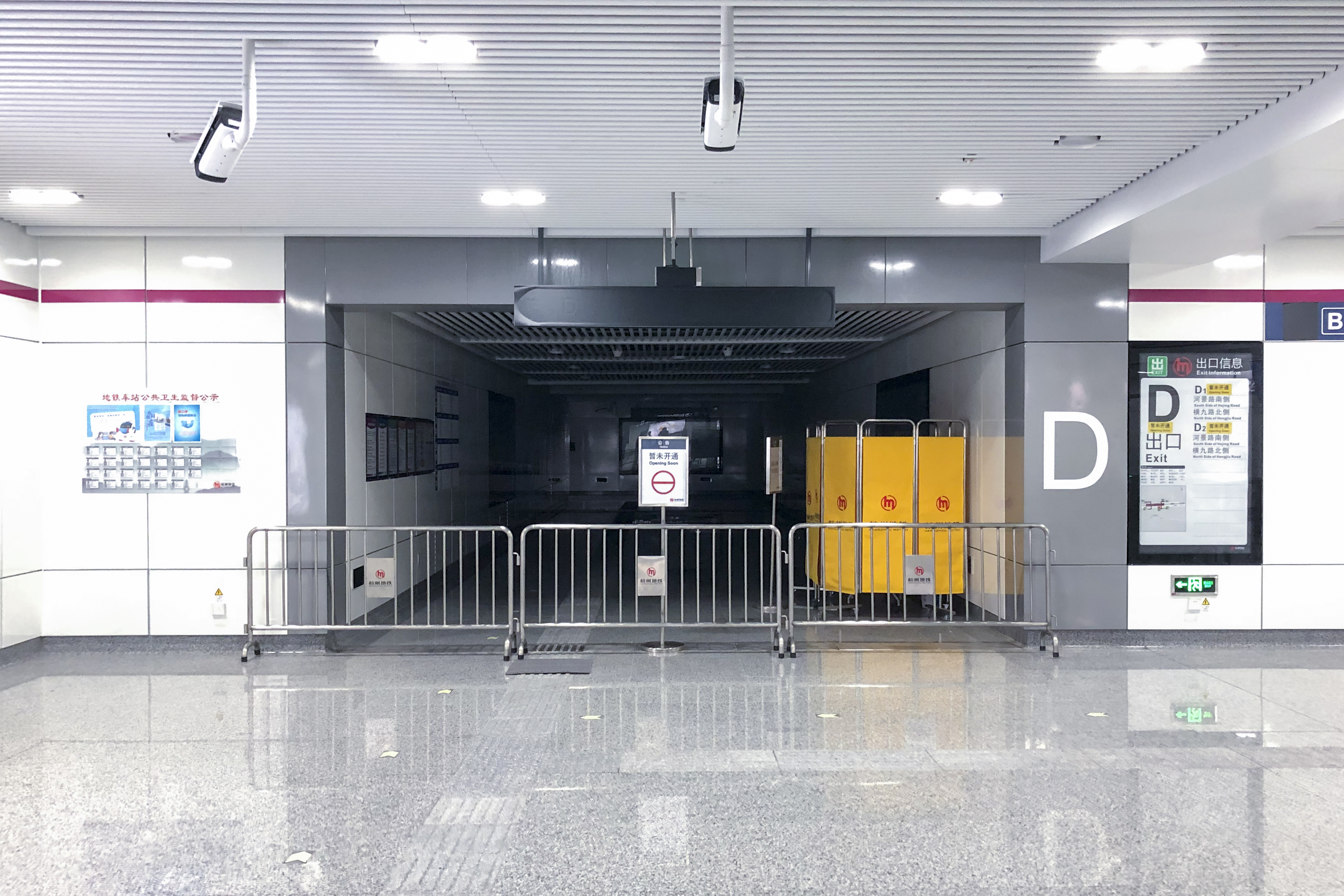
Entrance D looking from inside
