= Qiaotoubao station =

Metro station in Hangzhou, China

Coordinates: 30.3054°N 120.4292°E

Qiaotoubao 桥头堡
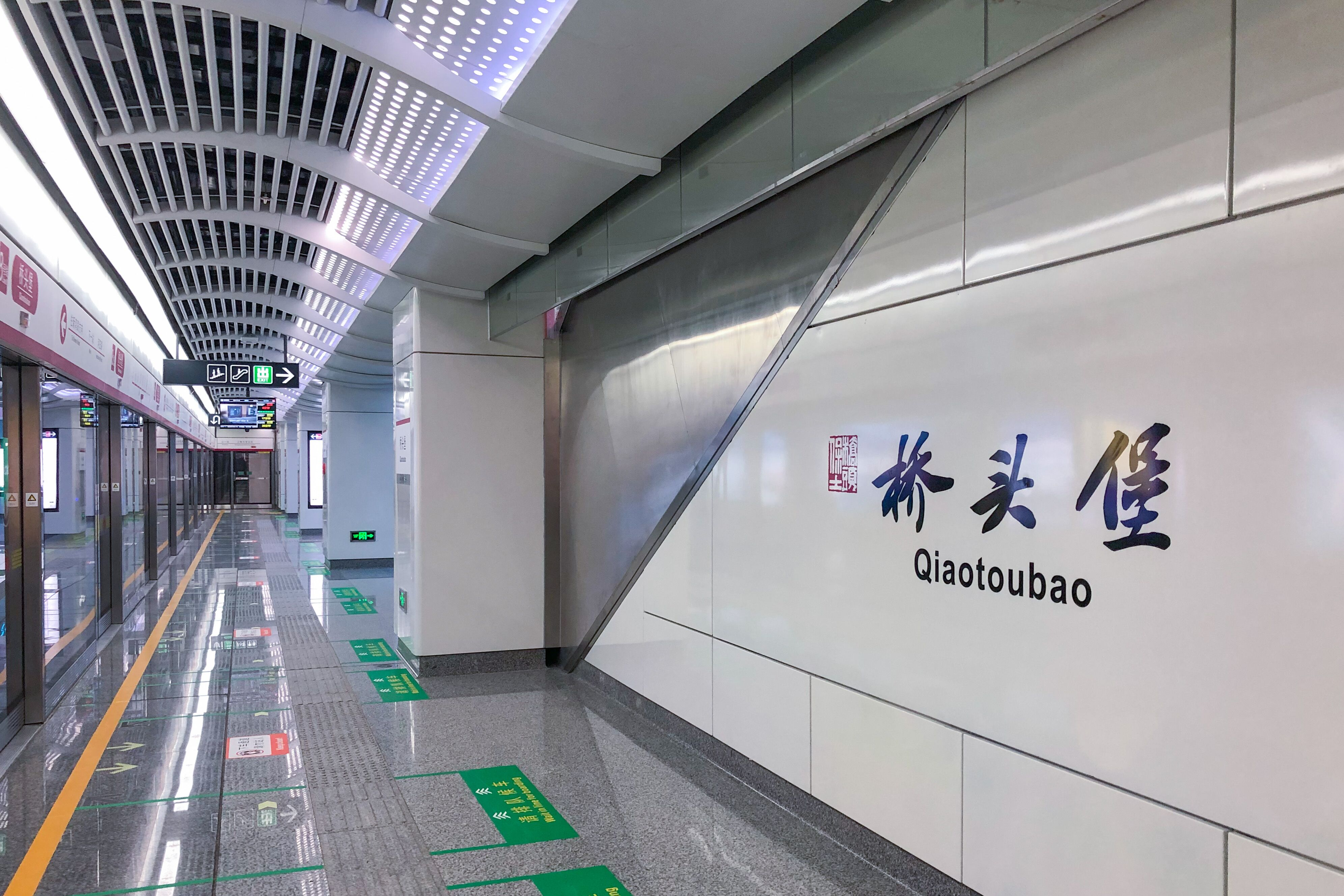

General information
- Location: Qiantang District, Hangzhou, Zhejiang; China
- Operated by: Hangzhou Metro Corporation
- Line(s): Line 8
- Platforms: 2 (1 island platform)

History
- Opened: 28 June 2021

Services
Preceding station	Hangzhou Metro	Following station
Gongshang University Yunbin towards South Wenhai Road	Line 8	Hezhuang Road towards Xinwan Road

Qiaotoubao (Chinese: 桥头堡) is a metro station on Line 8 of the Hangzhou Metro in China. Opened on 28 June 2021, it is located on the east bank of Qiantang River, in the Qiantang District of Hangzhou.
