= Middle Qingliu Road station =

Metro station in Zhejiang, China

Middle Qingliu Road 青六中路
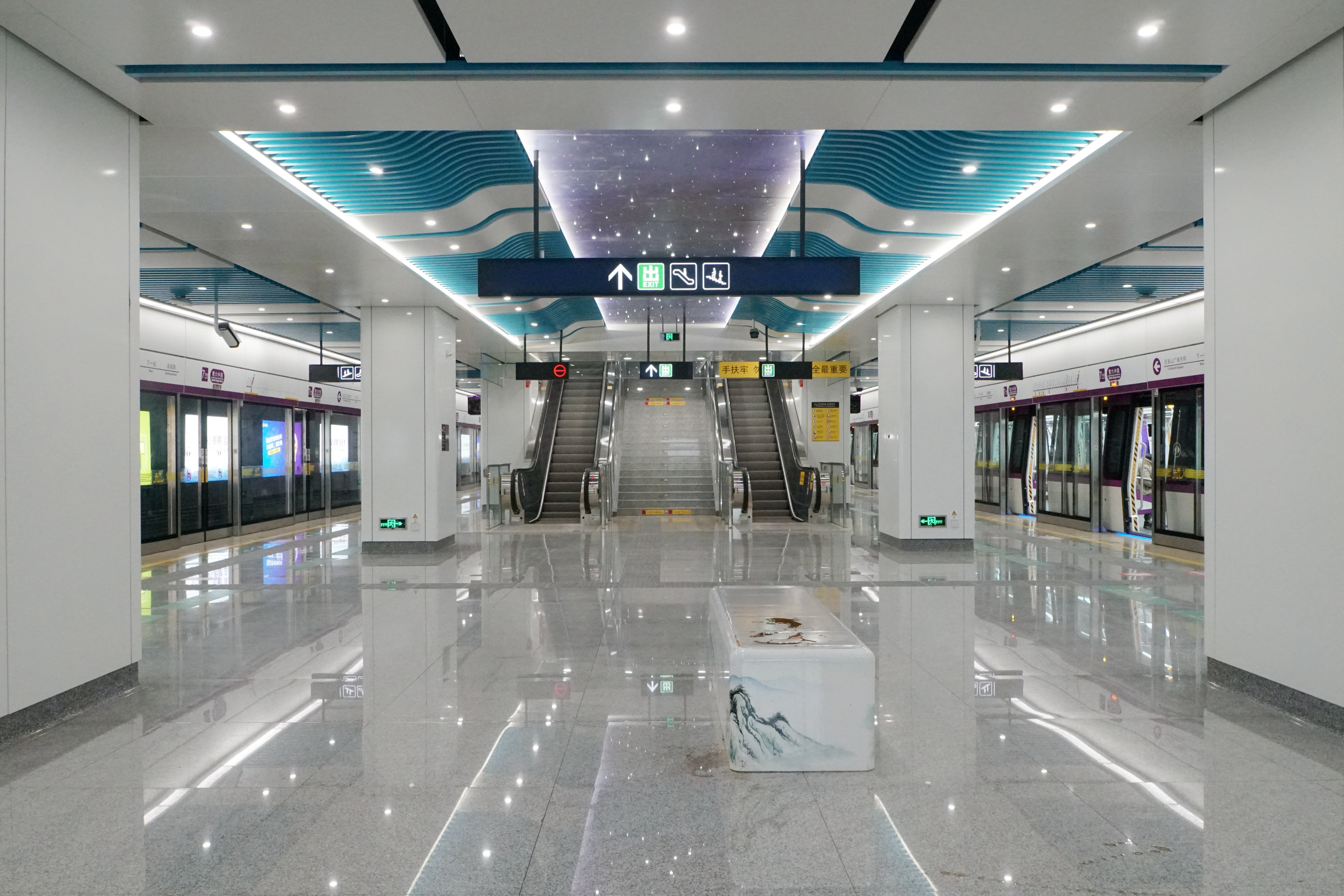
- Platforms of Line 7

General information
- Location: Qiantang District, Hangzhou, Zhejiang; China
- Operator: Hangzhou Metro Corporation
- Lines: Line 7 Line 8
- Platforms: 2 (1 island platform)

History
- Opened: Line 7: 30 December 2020; Line 8: 28 June 2021

Services
Preceding station	Hangzhou Metro	Following station
Tangxinxian towards Wushan Square	Line 7	Qicheng Road towards Jiangdong'er Road
Qingxisan Road towards South Wenhai Road	Line 8	Cangbeicun towards Xinwan Road
Location

Middle Qingliu Road (Chinese: 青六中路) is a metro station on Line 7 and Line 8 of the Hangzhou Metro in Zhejiang province, China. Opened on 30 December 2020, it is located in the Qiantang District of Hangzhou.

== Gallery ==
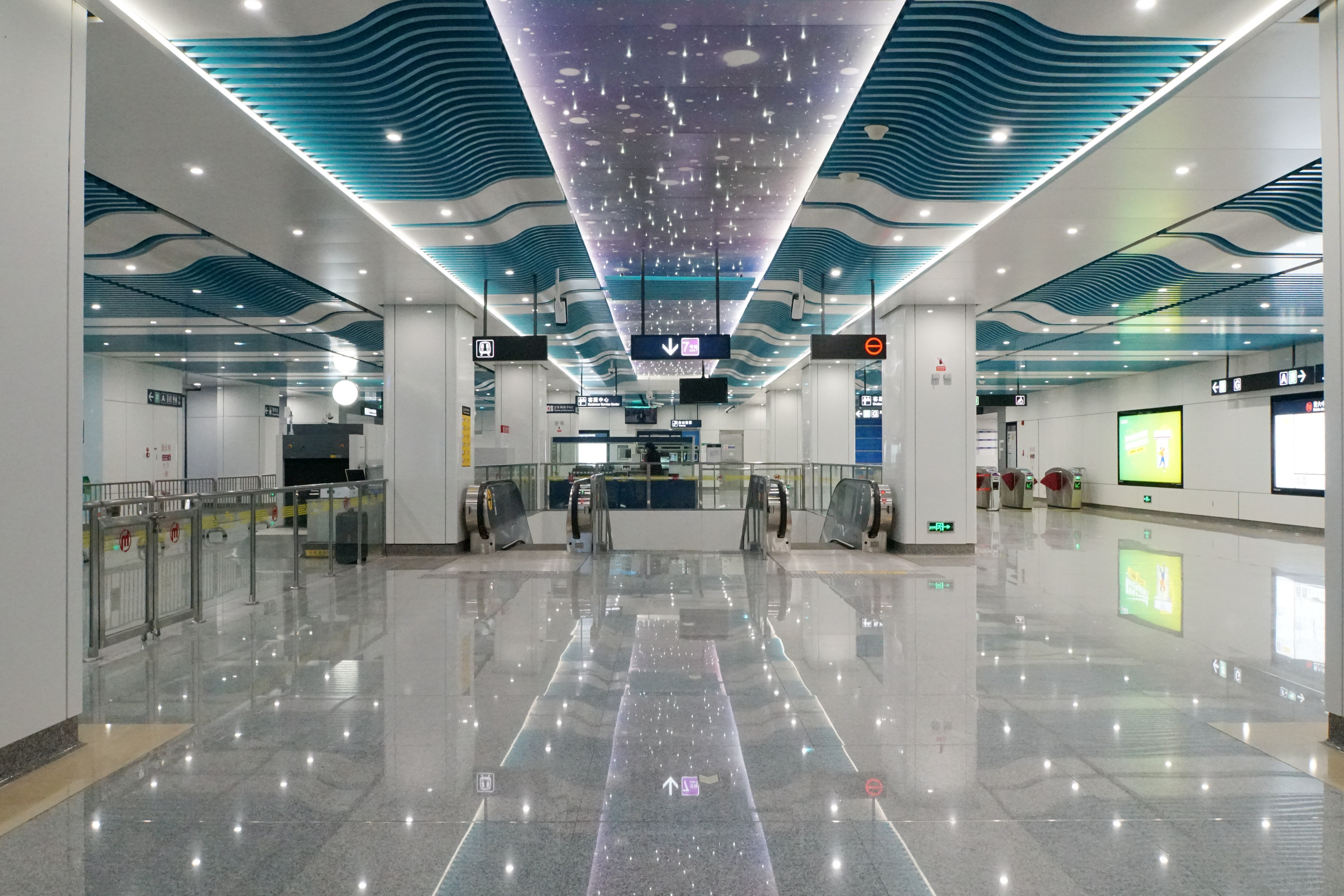
Concourse

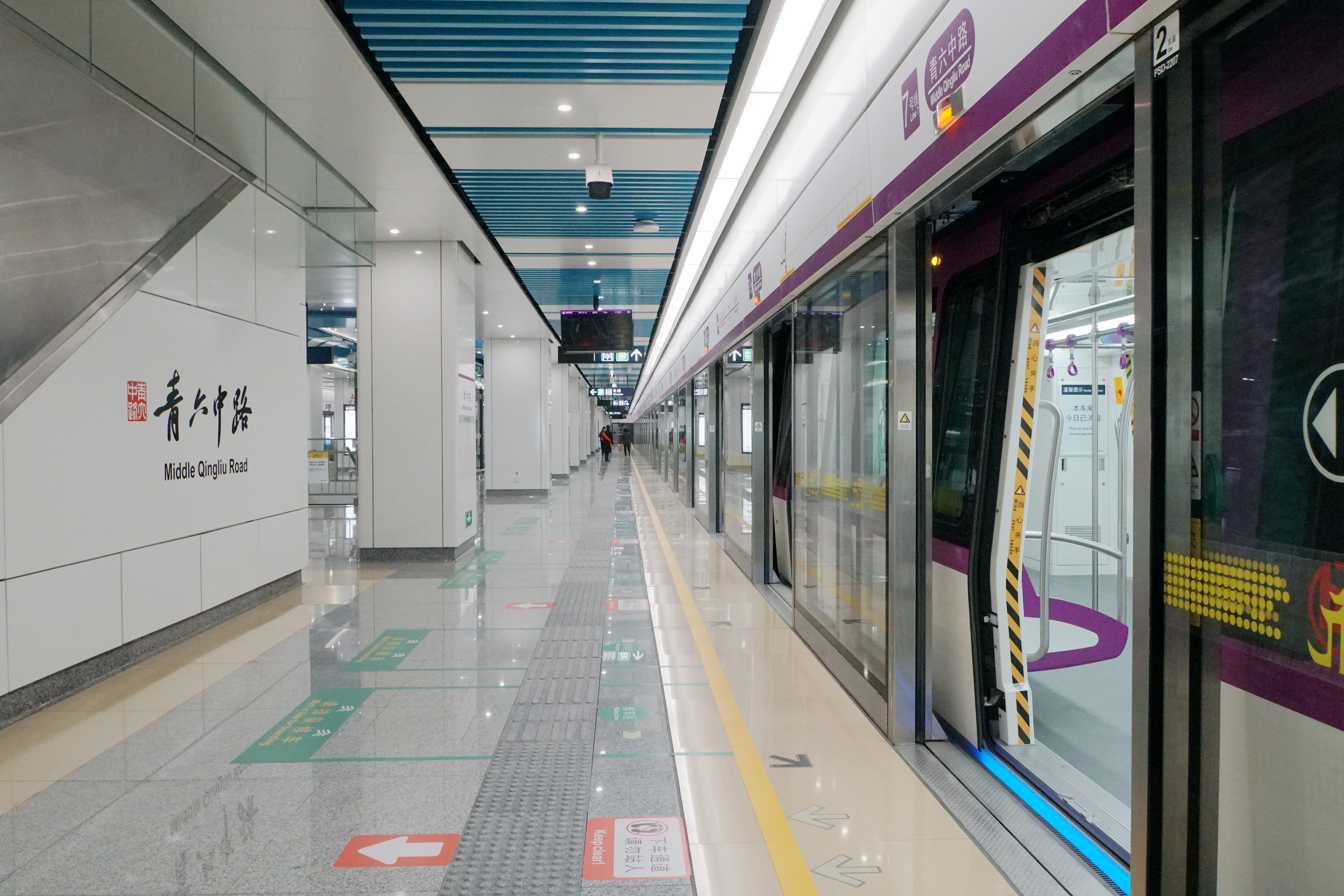
Upper platform (for Line 7)

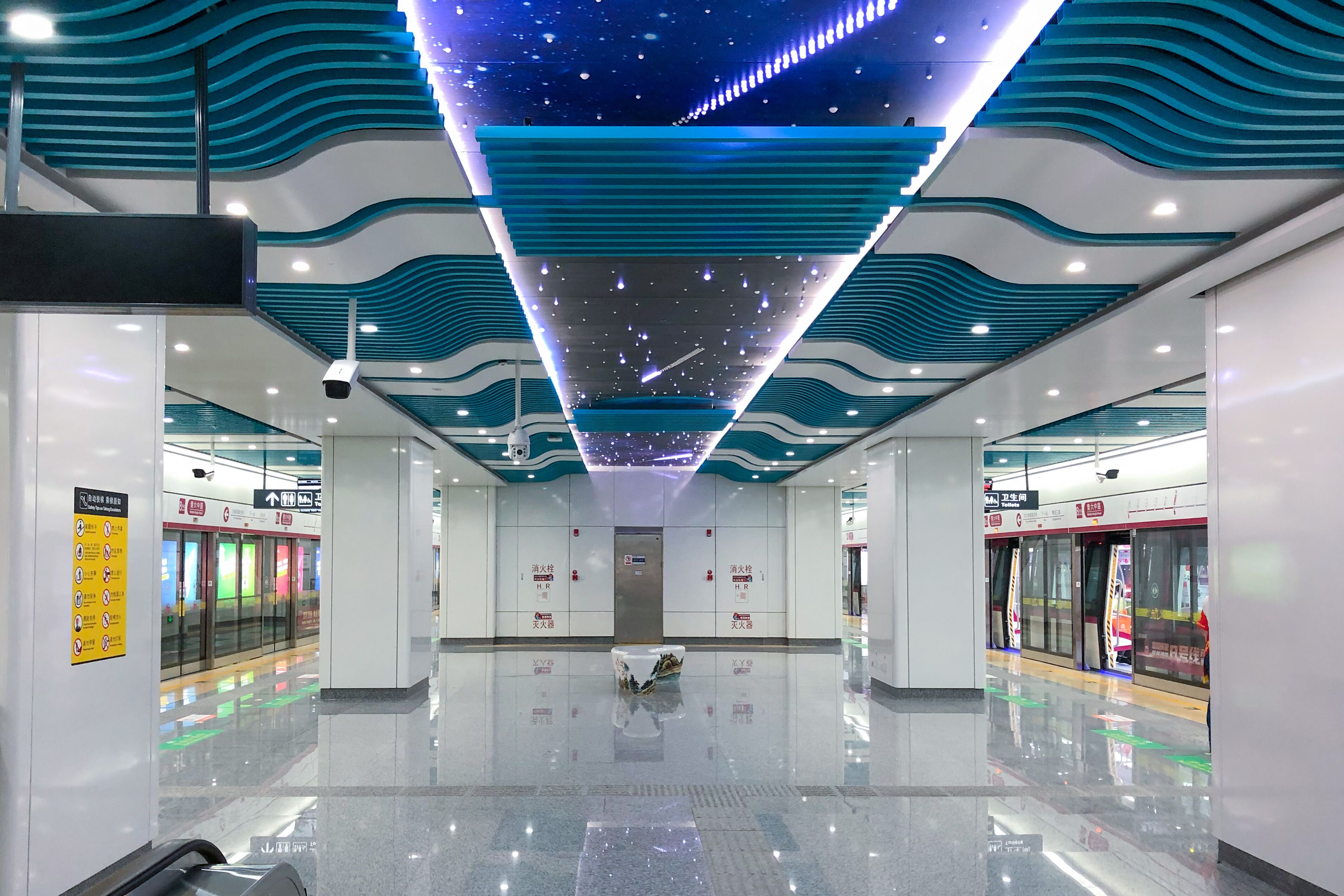
Lower platform (for Line 8)

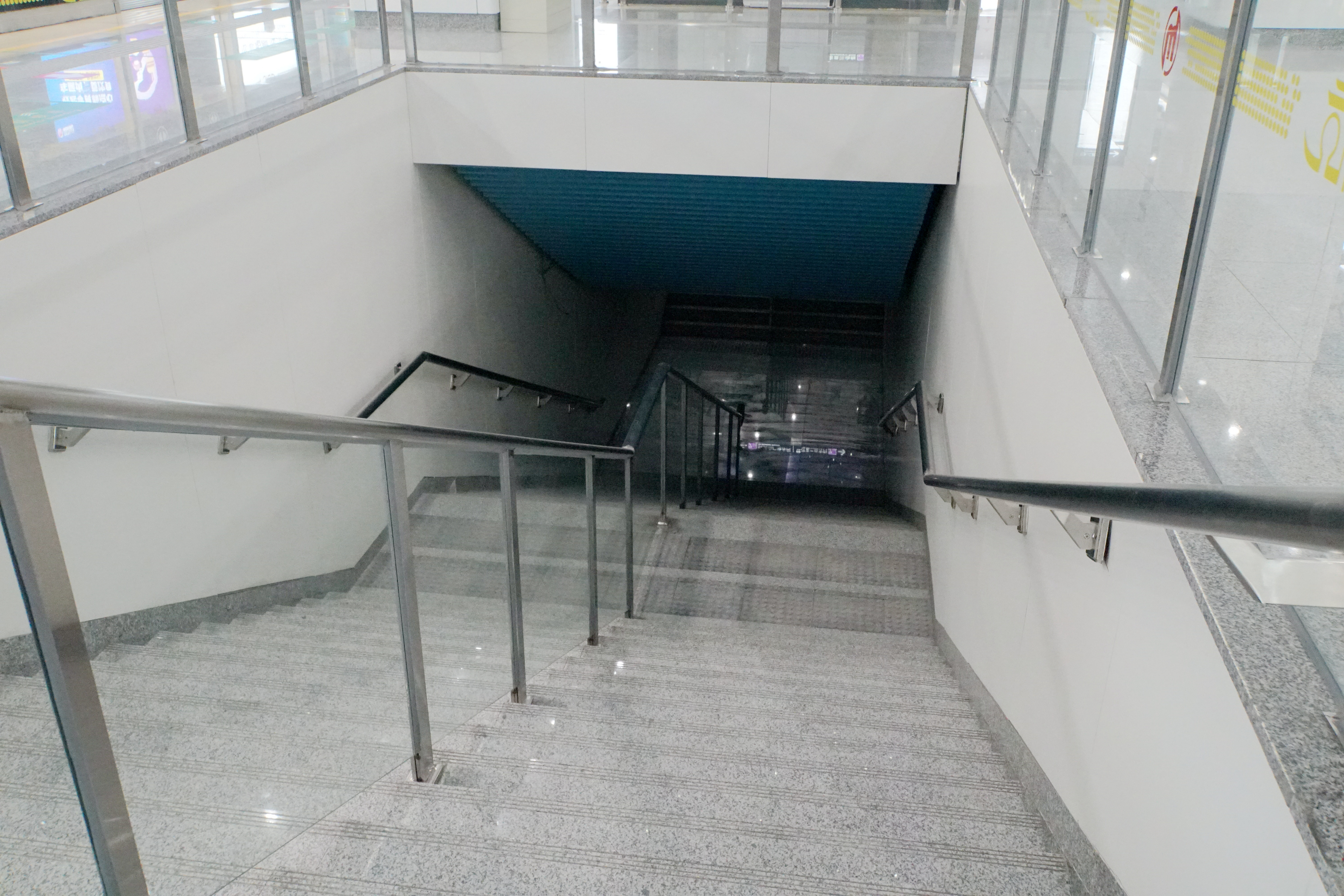
Stairs toward lower platform (January 2021)
