= Hezhuang Road station =

Metro station in Hangzhou, China

Hezhuang Road 河庄路
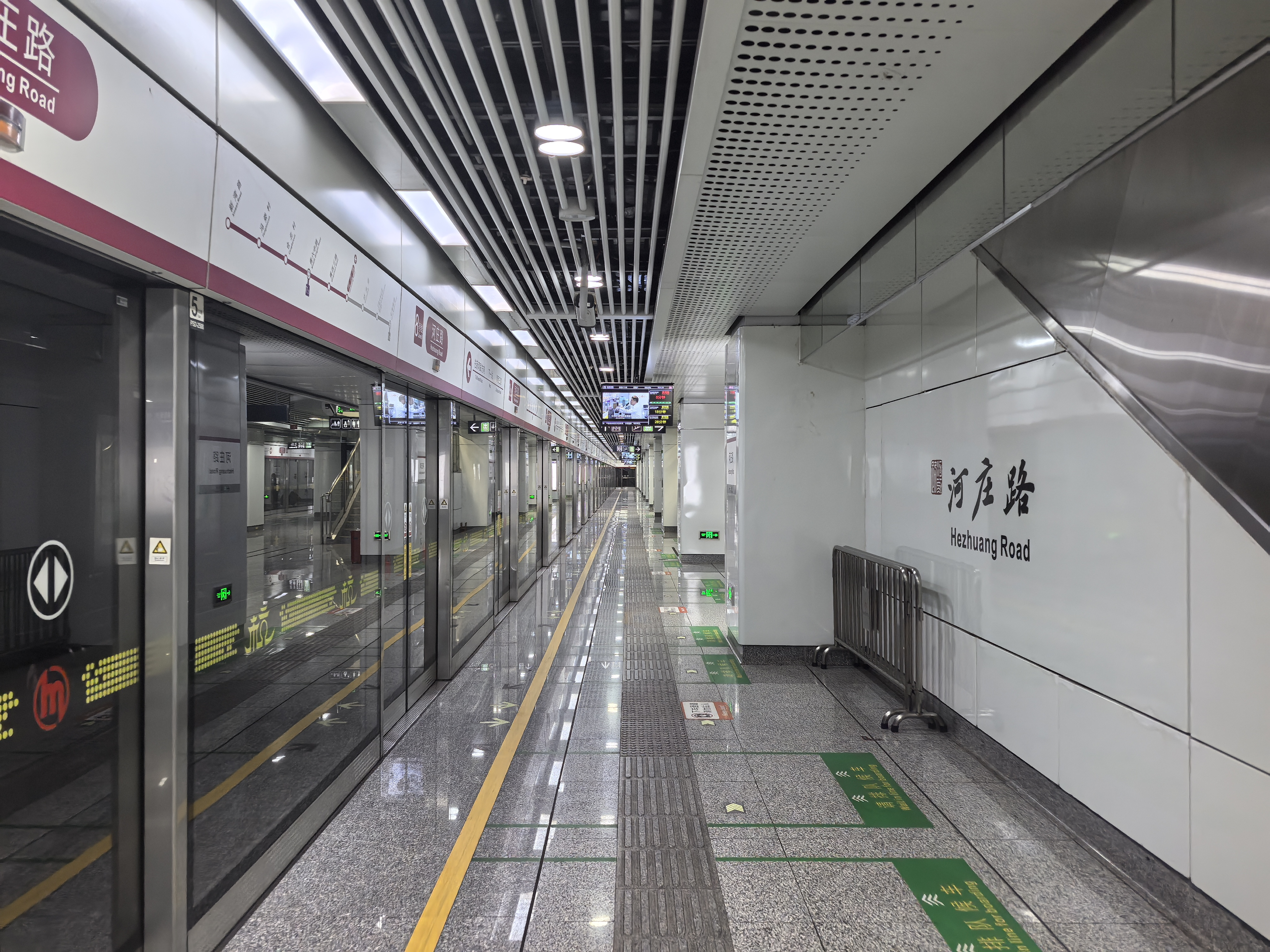

General information
- Location: Qiantang District, Hangzhou, Zhejiang; China
- Operated by: Hangzhou Metro Corporation
- Line: Line 8

Other information
- Station code: HZL

History
- Opened: 28 June 2021

Services
Preceding station	Hangzhou Metro	Following station
Qiaotoubao towards South Wenhai Road	Line 8	Qingxisan Road towards Xinwan Road
Location

Hezhuang Road (Chinese: 河庄路) is a metro station on Line 8 of the Hangzhou Metro in China. It was opened on 28 June 2021, together with the Line 8. It is located in the center of Hezhuang Block in Qiantang District of Hangzhou.

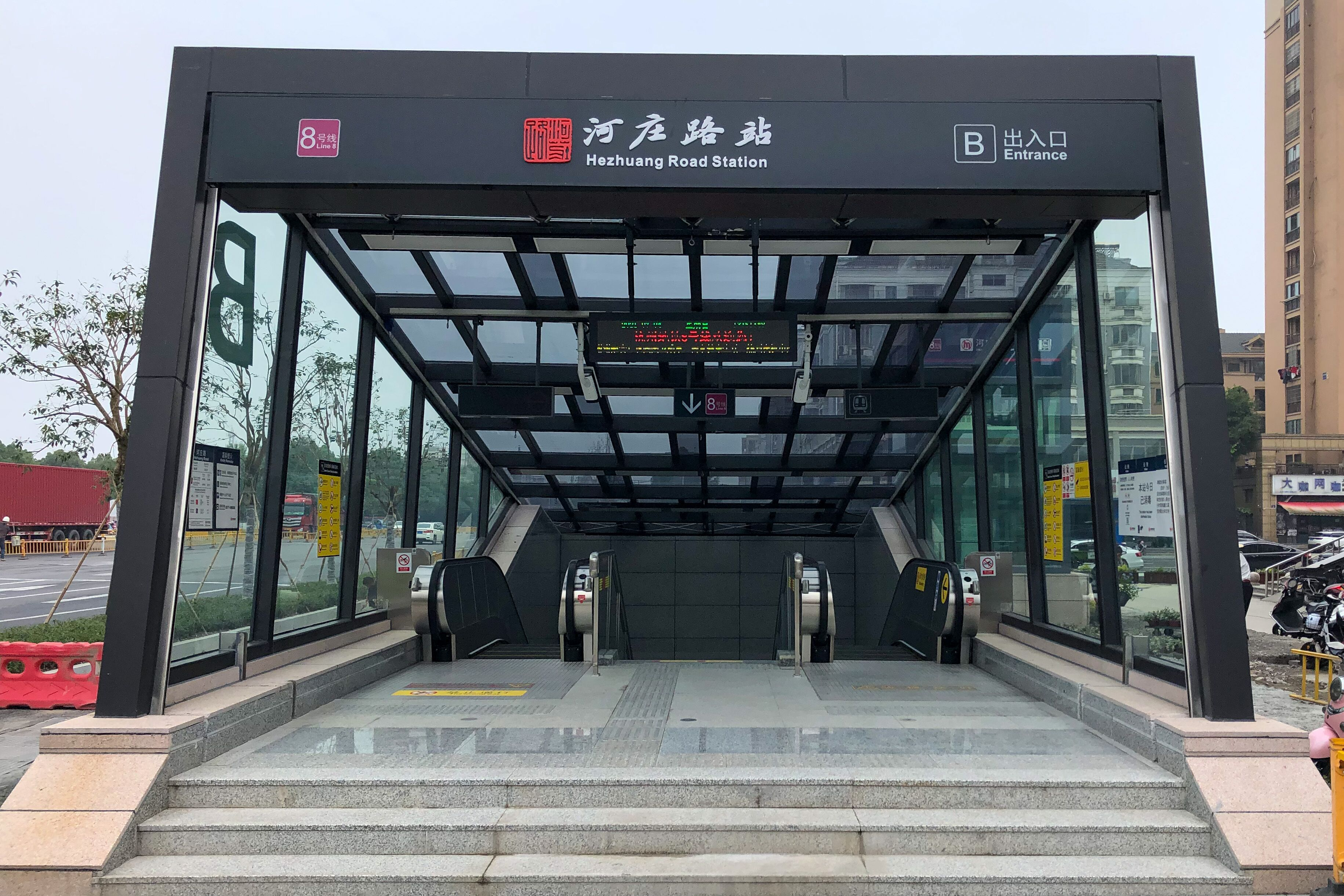
Entrance B
