= XZL =

XZL may refer to:

- XZL, the station code for Edmonton station, Alberta, Canada
- XZL, the station code for Xinzhen Road station, Zhejiang, China
