= TXX =

TXX may refer to:

- Tangxinxian station (station code TXX), a station in Xiaoshan, Hangzhou
- Tatana language (ISO 639-3 code txx), a language spoken in Sabah
- Austin Express (ICAO code TXX), a defunct American airline
