= Fengloucun station =

Metro station in Hangzhou, China

Fengloucun 冯娄村

General information
- Location: Qiantang District, Hangzhou, Zhejiang; China
- Coordinates: 30.2966°N 120.5169°E
- Operator: Hangzhou Metro Corporation
- Line: Line 8
- Platforms: 2 (1 island platform)

History
- Opened: 28 June 2021

Services
Preceding station	Hangzhou Metro	Following station
Cangbeicun towards South Wenhai Road	Line 8	Xinwan Road Terminus
Location

Fengloucun (Chinese: 冯娄村) is a metro station on Line 8 of the Hangzhou Metro in China. Opened on 28 June 2021, it is located in the Qiantang District of Hangzhou. In the future planning it will connect the Qiantang Railway Station.

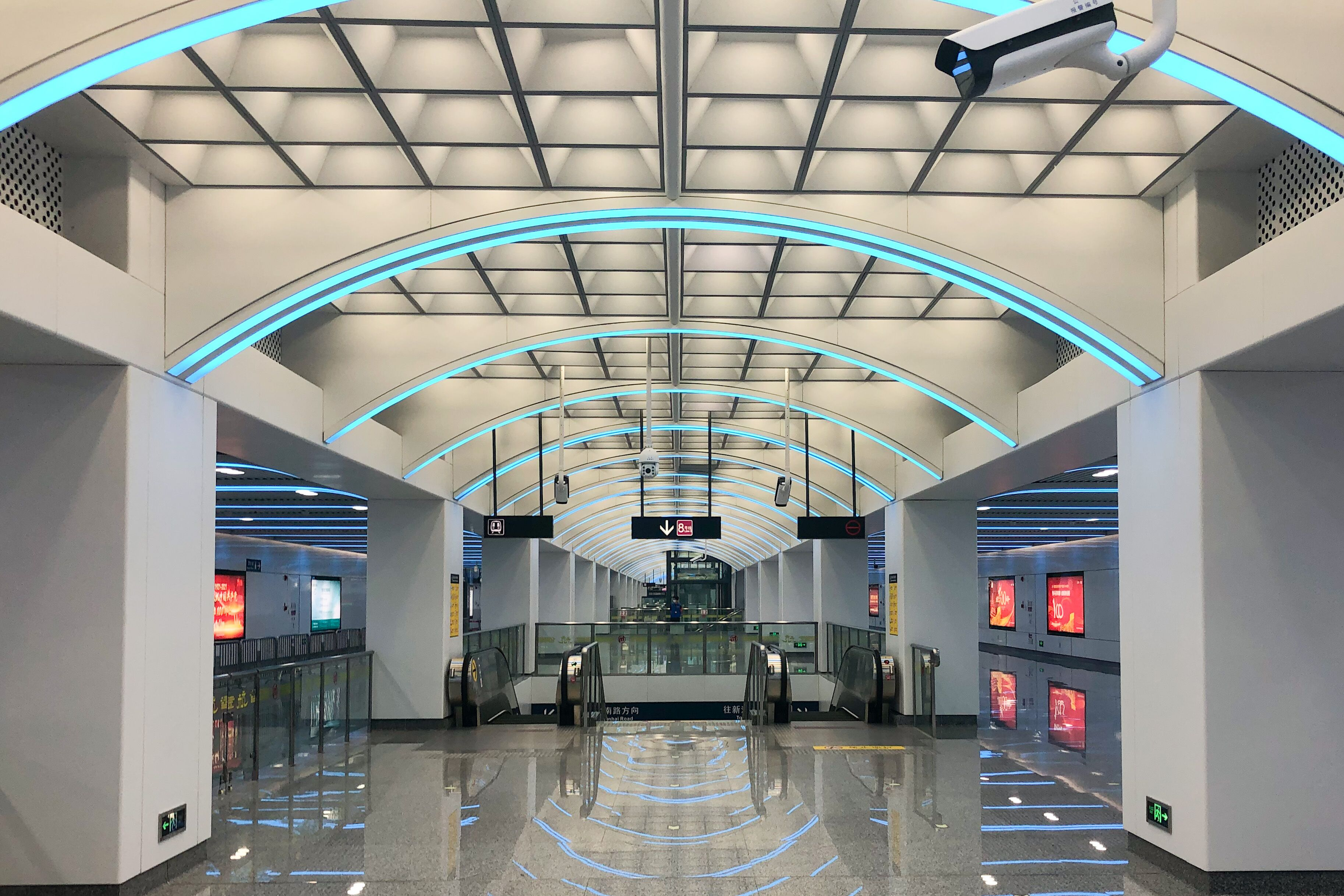
Concourse
