= QXS =

QXS or qxs may refer to:

- QXS, the station code for Qingxisan Road station, Zhejiang, China
- qxs, the ISO 639-3 code for Southern Qiang language, Sichuan Province, China
