= Qingxisan Road station =

Metro station in Hangzhou, China

Qingxisan Road 青西三路
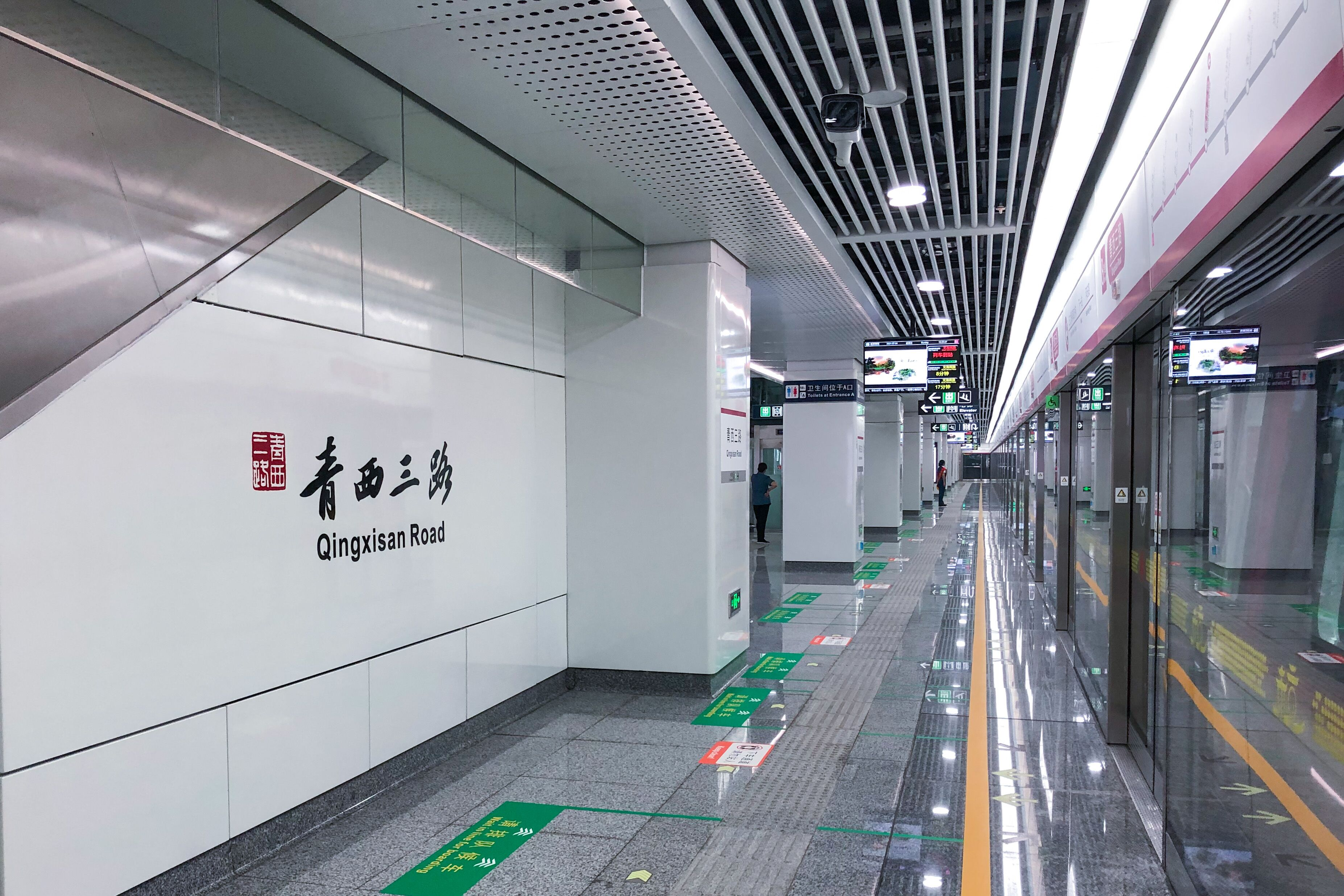

General information
- Location: Qiantang District, Hangzhou, Zhejiang; China
- Coordinates: 30.3006°N 120.4733°E
- Operated by: Hangzhou Metro Corporation
- Line(s): Line 8

Other information
- Station code: QXS

History
- Opened: 28 June 2021

Services
Preceding station	Hangzhou Metro	Following station
Hezhuang Road towards South Wenhai Road	Line 8	Middle Qingliu Road towards Xinwan Road

Qingxisan Road (Chinese: 青西三路) is a metro station on Line 8 of the Hangzhou Metro in China. It was opened on 28 June 2021, together with the Line 8. It is located in the Qiantang District of Hangzhou.
