= Gongshang University Yunbin station =

Metro station in Hangzhou, China

Gongshang University Yunbin 工商大学云滨
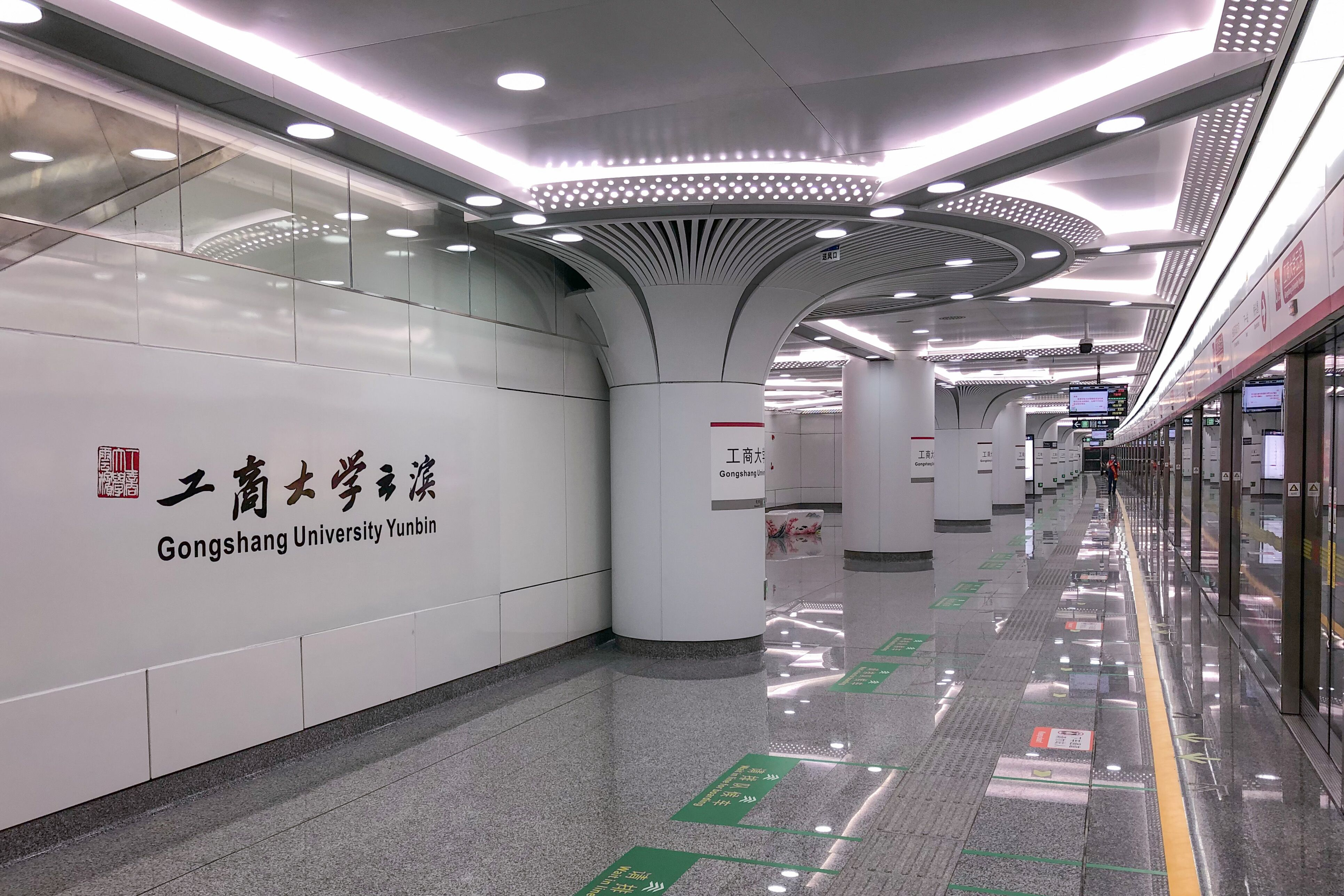
- Platform towards Xinwan Road

General information
- Location: No.2 Street (2号大街); Qiantang District, Hangzhou, Zhejiang; China
- Coordinates: 30°18′48″N 120°23′19″E
- Operated by: Hangzhou Metro Corporation
- Line: Line 8
- Platforms: 2 (2 side platforms)

Construction
- Structure type: Underground
- Accessible: Yes

History
- Opened: 28 June 2021

Services
Preceding station	Hangzhou Metro	Following station
South Wenhai Road Terminus	Line 8	Qiaotoubao towards Xinwan Road
Location

Gongshang University Yunbin (Chinese: 工商大学云滨) is a metro station on Line 8 of the Hangzhou Metro in China. Opened on 28 June 2021, it is located on the west bank of Qiantang River, in the Qiantang District of Hangzhou.

== Station layout ==
Gongshang University Yunbin has three levels: a concourse, and two side platforms with two tracks for line 8.

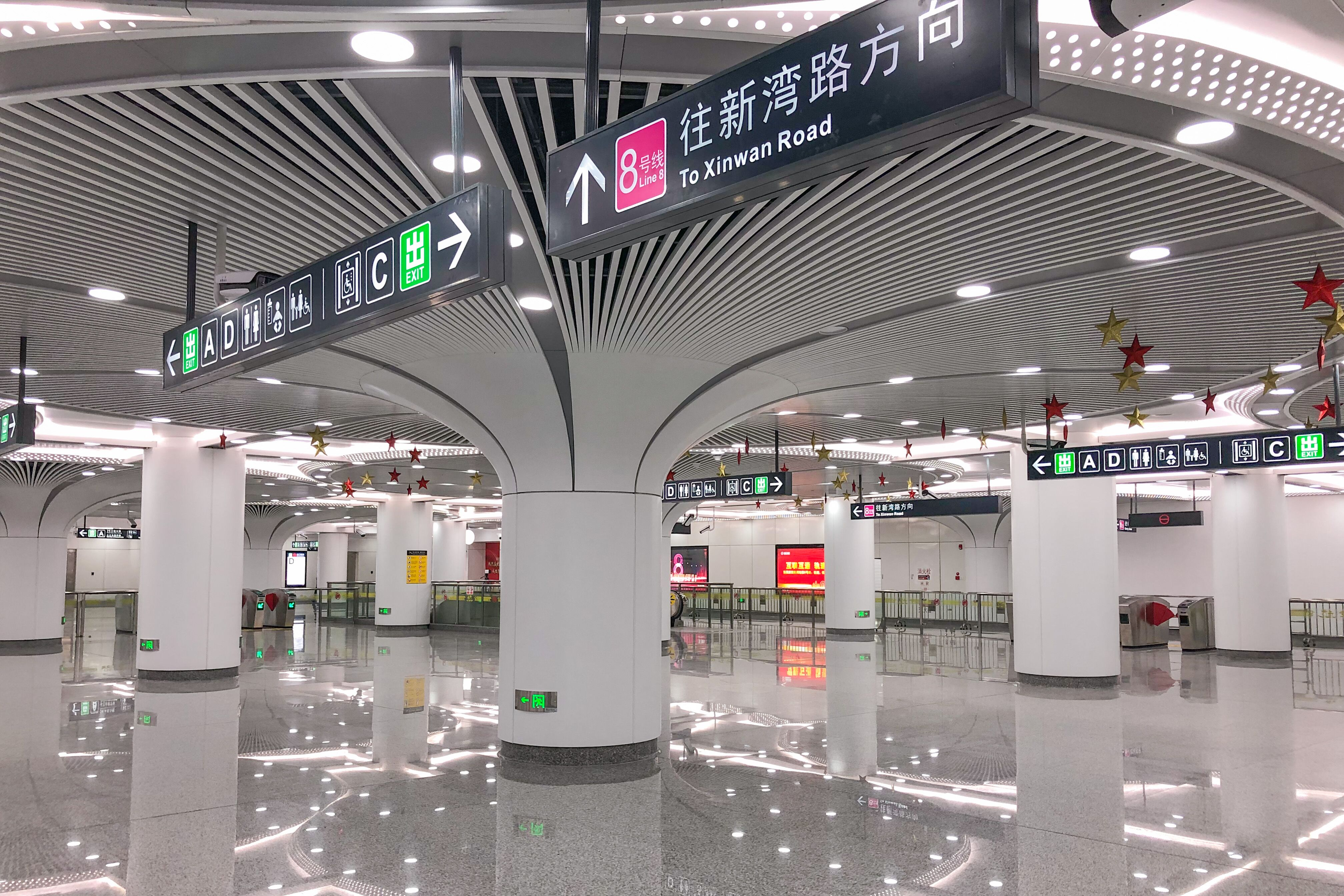
Concourse

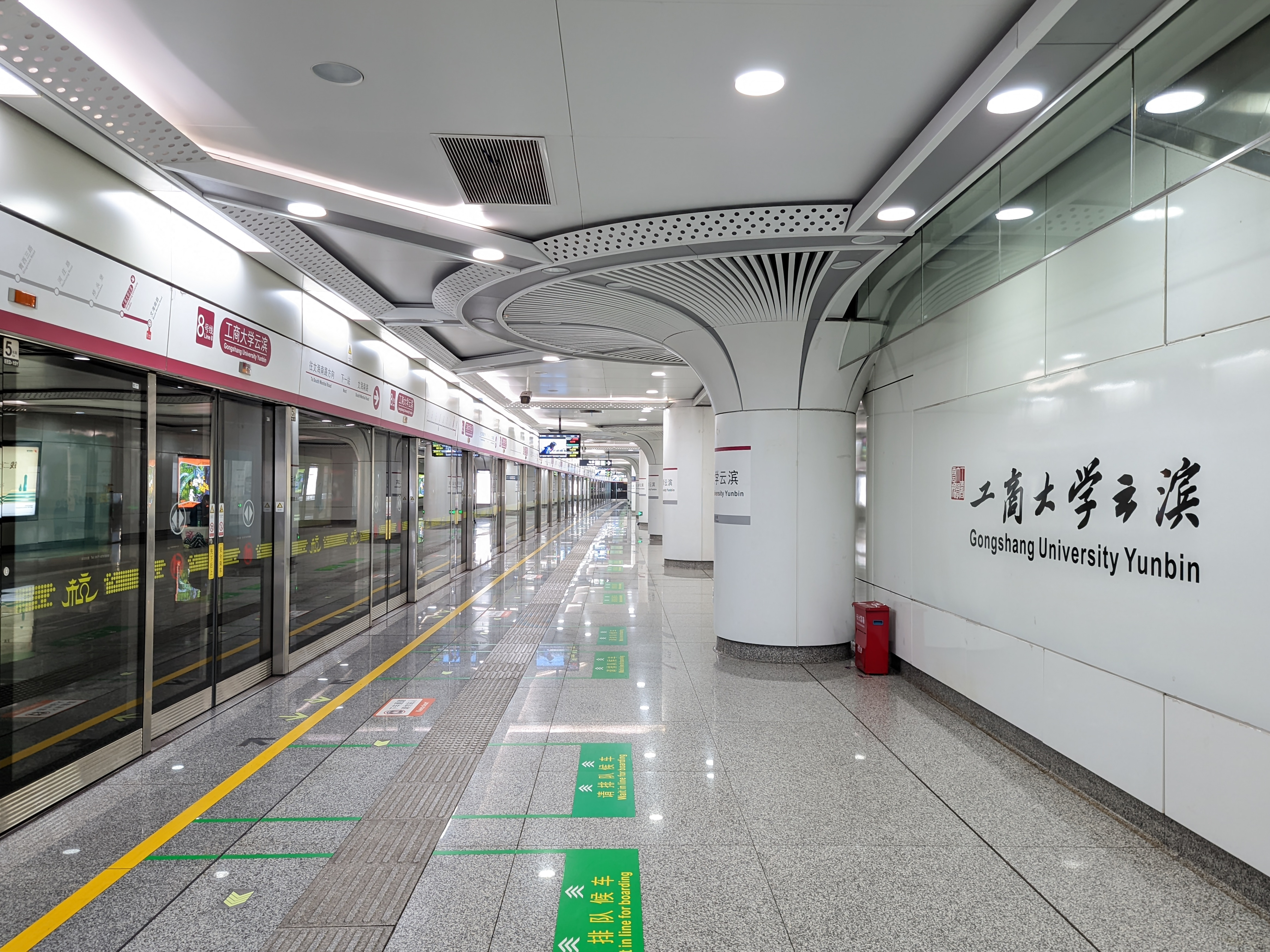
Platform towards South Wenhai Road

=== Entrances/exits ===
- A: north side of No.2 Street, Zhijiang Road (E)
- C: Zhejiang Gongshang University
- D: Zhejiang Gongshang University
