= Line 8 (Hangzhou Metro) =

Metro line of the Hangzhou Metro system in China

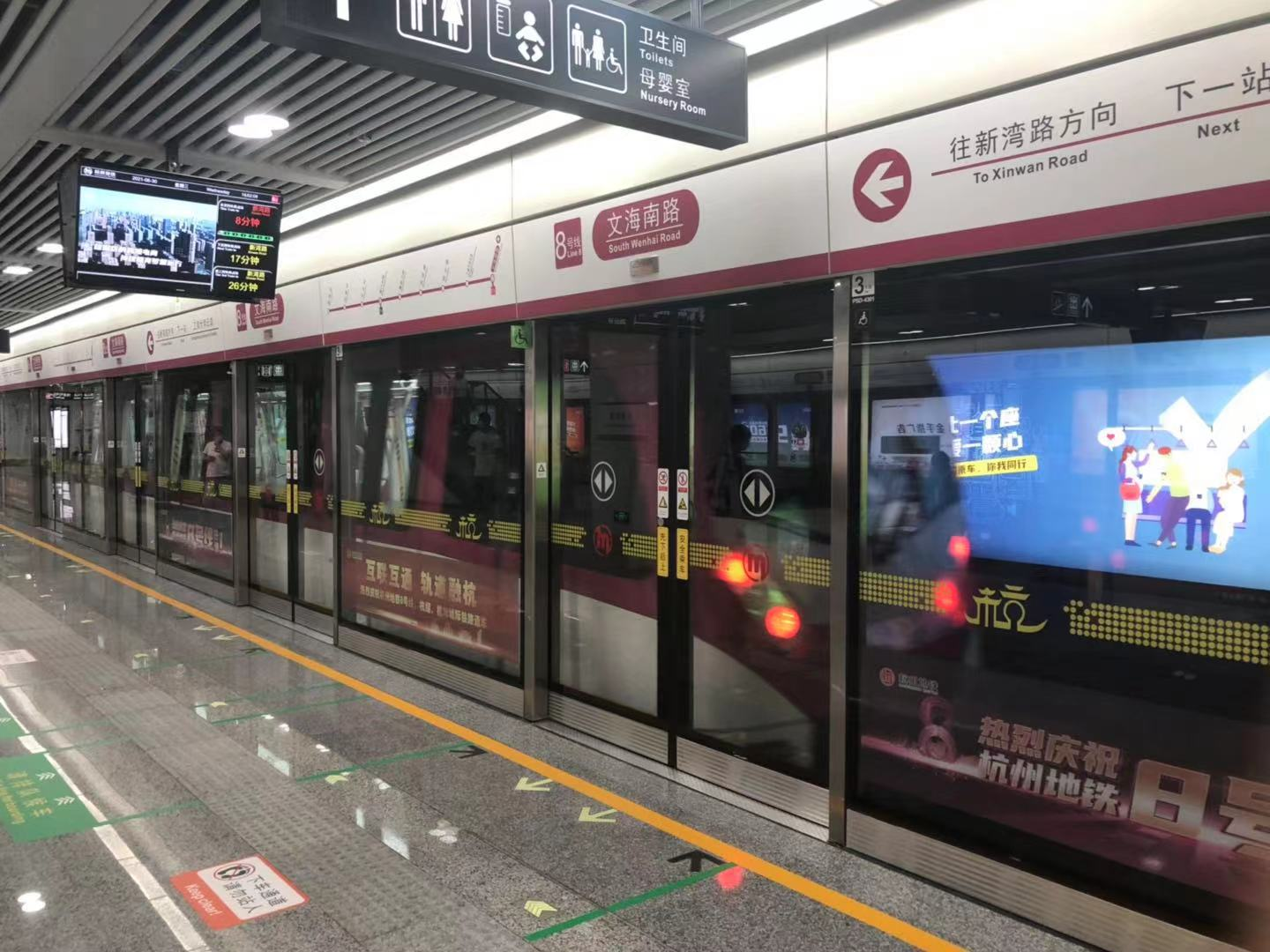
- Line 8 train departing from South Wenhai Road station

Overview
- Status: Operational
- Owner: City of Hangzhou
- Locale: Hangzhou, Zhejiang, China
- Termini: South Wenhai Road; Xinwan Road
- Stations: 9

Service
- Type: Rapid transit
- System: Hangzhou Metro
- Services: 1
- Operator: Hangzhou Metro Corporation
- Depot: Xinwan Depot
- Rolling stock: PM158

History
- Opened: 28 June 2021; 5 years ago

Technical
- Line length: 17.17 km (10.67 mi)
- Character: Underground
- Track gauge: 1,435 mm (4 ft 8 1/2 in)
- Electrification: Overhead, 1500 V DC
- Operating speed: 100 km/h (62 mph)

Line 8 of the Hangzhou Metro (simplified Chinese: 杭州地铁八号线; traditional Chinese: 杭州地鐵八號線; pinyin: Hángzhōu Dìtiě Bāhào Xiàn) is a metro line in Hangzhou. The line is 17.17 km long and will run in a west–east direction between South Wenhai Road station and Xinwan Road station in Qiantang District. The line was opened on 28 June 2021.

== Stations ==
Station name		Connections	Location
English	Chinese	Connections	Location
South Wenhai Road	文海南路	1	Qiantang
Gongshang University Yunbin	工商大学云滨		Qiantang
Qiaotoubao	桥头堡		Qiantang
Hezhuang Road	河庄路		Qiantang
Qingxisan Road	青西三路		Qiantang
Middle Qingliu Road	青六中路	7	Qiantang
Cangbeicun	仓北村		Qiantang
Fengloucun	冯娄村	Qiantang (planned)	Qiantang
Xinwan Road	新湾路		Qiantang

Hangzhou Metro Line 8 map drawn to scale.

== Rolling stock ==
Stock	Class	Year built	Builder	Number built	Numbers	Formation	Depots	Line assigned	Notes
PM158	A	2020-2021	CRRC Nanjing Puzhen	66 (11 sets)	08 001 - 08 011 (080011-080116)	Tc+Mp+M+M+Mp+Tc	Xinwan Depot	8	

== See also ==
- Hangzhou Metro
