= Yipeng station =

Metro station in China

Yipeng 义蓬
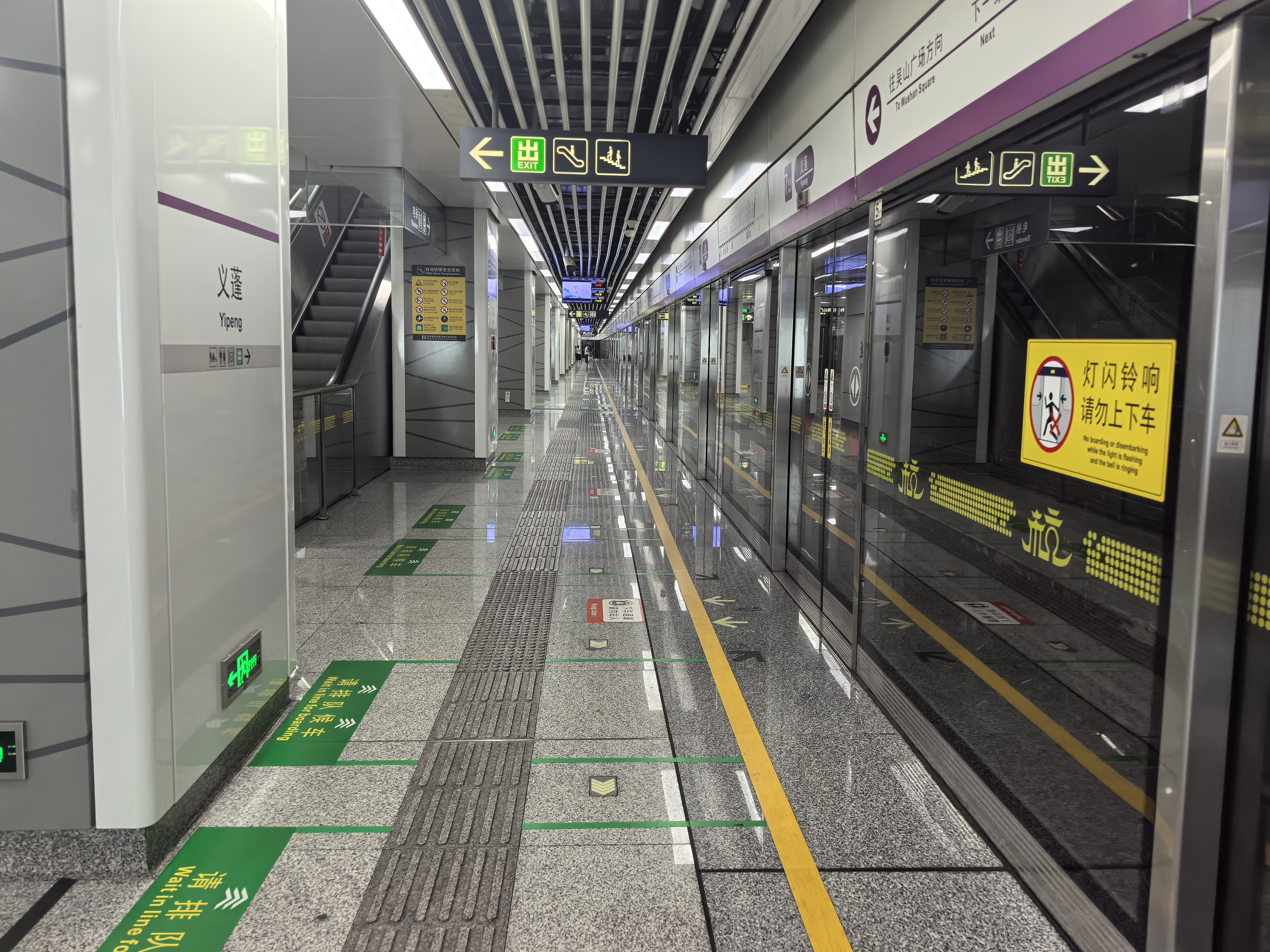

General information
- Location: Qiantang District, Hangzhou, Zhejiang; China
- Operator: Hangzhou Metro Corporation
- Line: Line 7
- Platforms: 2 (1 island platform)

History
- Opened: 30 December 2020

Services
| Preceding station | Hangzhou Metro | Following station |
|---|---|---|
| Xinzhen Road towards Wushan Square | Line 7 | Tangxinxian towards Jiangdong'er Road |
Location

Yipeng (Chinese: 义蓬) is a metro station on Line 7 of the Hangzhou Metro in China. Opened on 30 December 2020, it is located in the Qiantang District of Hangzhou.
