= Xinzhen Road station =

Metro station in Hangzhou, China

Xinzhen Road 新镇路
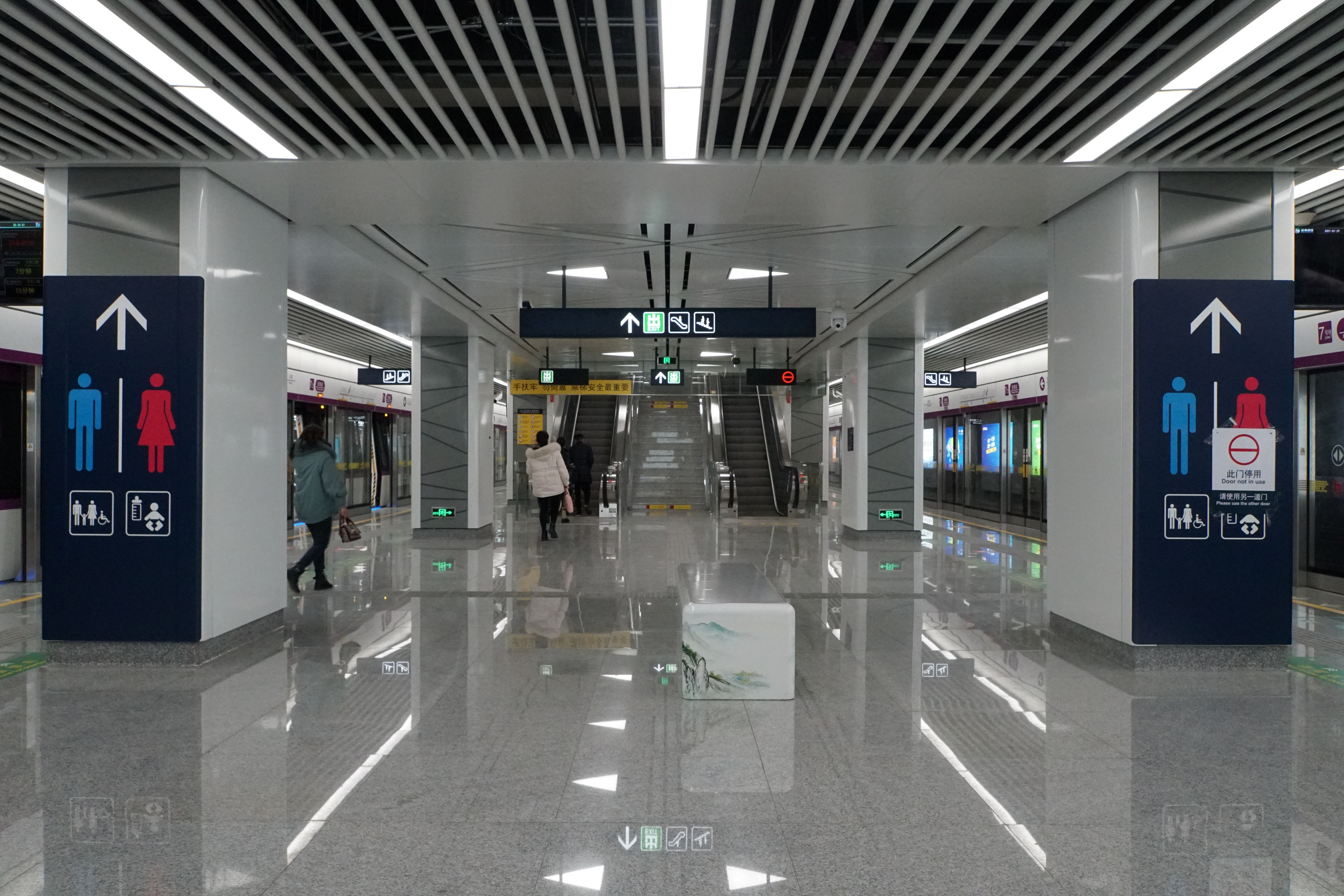

General information
- Location: Qiantang District, Hangzhou, Zhejiang; China
- Coordinates: 30.2607°N 120.47994°E
- Operator: Hangzhou Metro Corporation
- Line: Line 7

Other information
- Station code: XZL

History
- Opened: 30 December 2020; 5 years ago

Services
Preceding station	Hangzhou Metro	Following station
Yongsheng Road towards Wushan Square	Line 7	Yipeng towards Jiangdong'er Road
Location

Xinzhen Road (Chinese: 新镇路) is a metro station on Line 7 of the Hangzhou Metro in China. It was opened on 30 December 2020, together with Line 7. It is located in the Qiantang District of Hangzhou.
