= Tangxinxian station =

Metro station in Xiaoshan, Hangzhou

Tangxinxian 塘新线
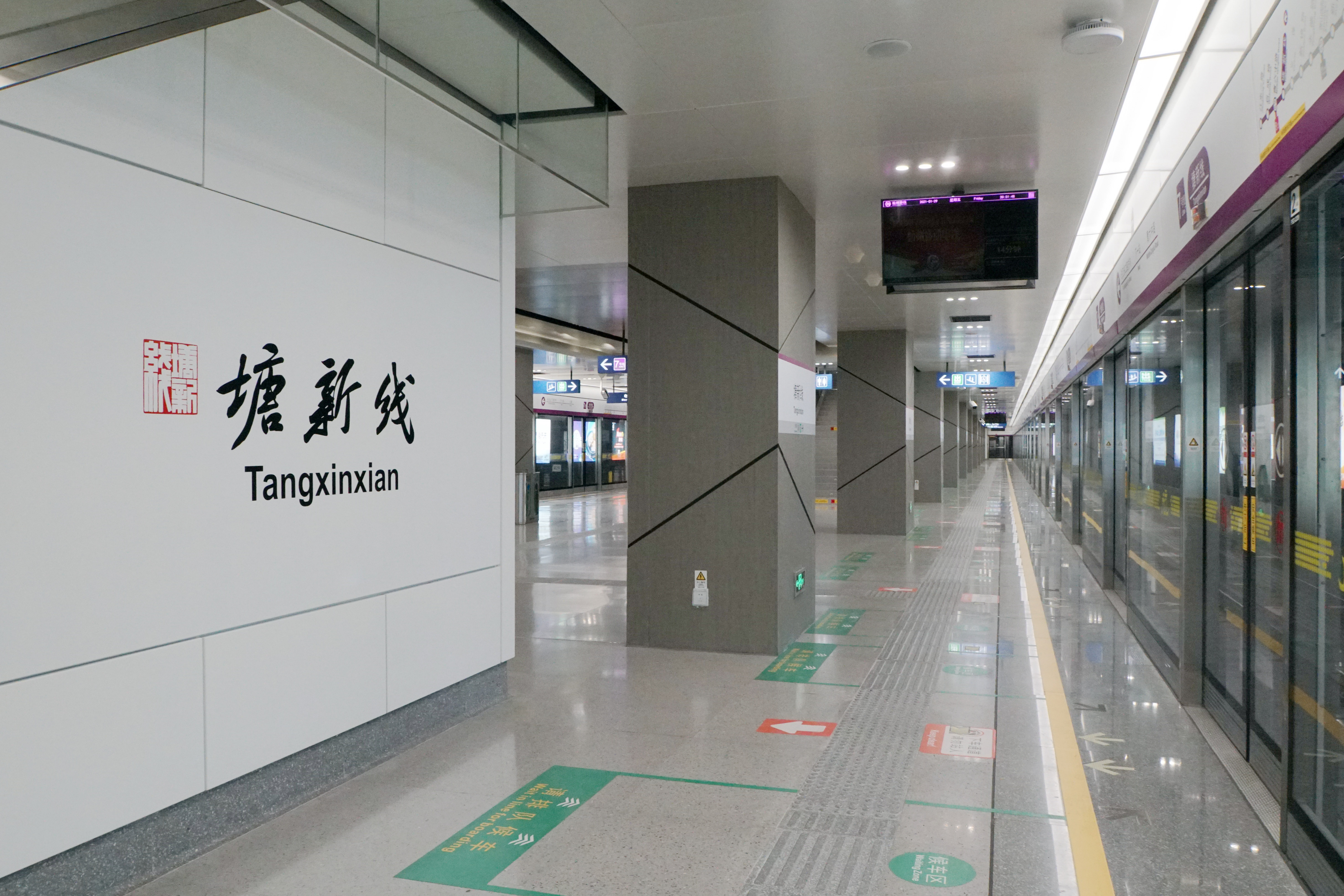

General information
- Location: Qiantang District, Hangzhou, Zhejiang; China
- Operator: Hangzhou Metro Corporation
- Line: Line 7

Other information
- Station code: TXX

History
- Opened: 30 December 2020

Services
Preceding station	Hangzhou Metro	Following station
Yipeng towards Wushan Square	Line 7	Middle Qingliu Road towards Jiangdong'er Road
Location

Tangxinxian (Chinese: 塘新线) is a metro station on Line 7 of the Hangzhou Metro in China. It was opened on 30 December 2020, together with Line 7. It is located in the Qiantang District of Hangzhou.

== Gallery ==
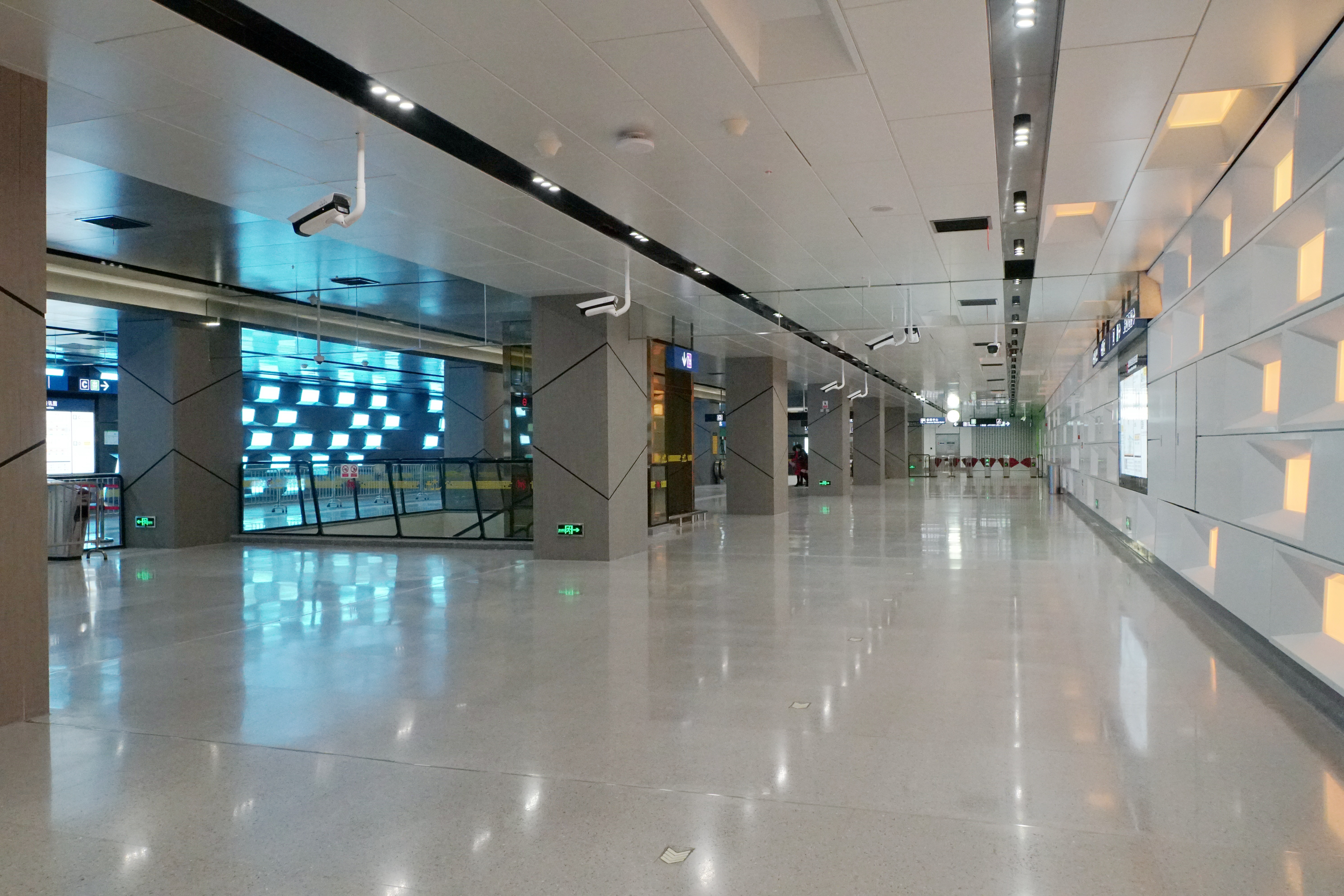
Concourse view

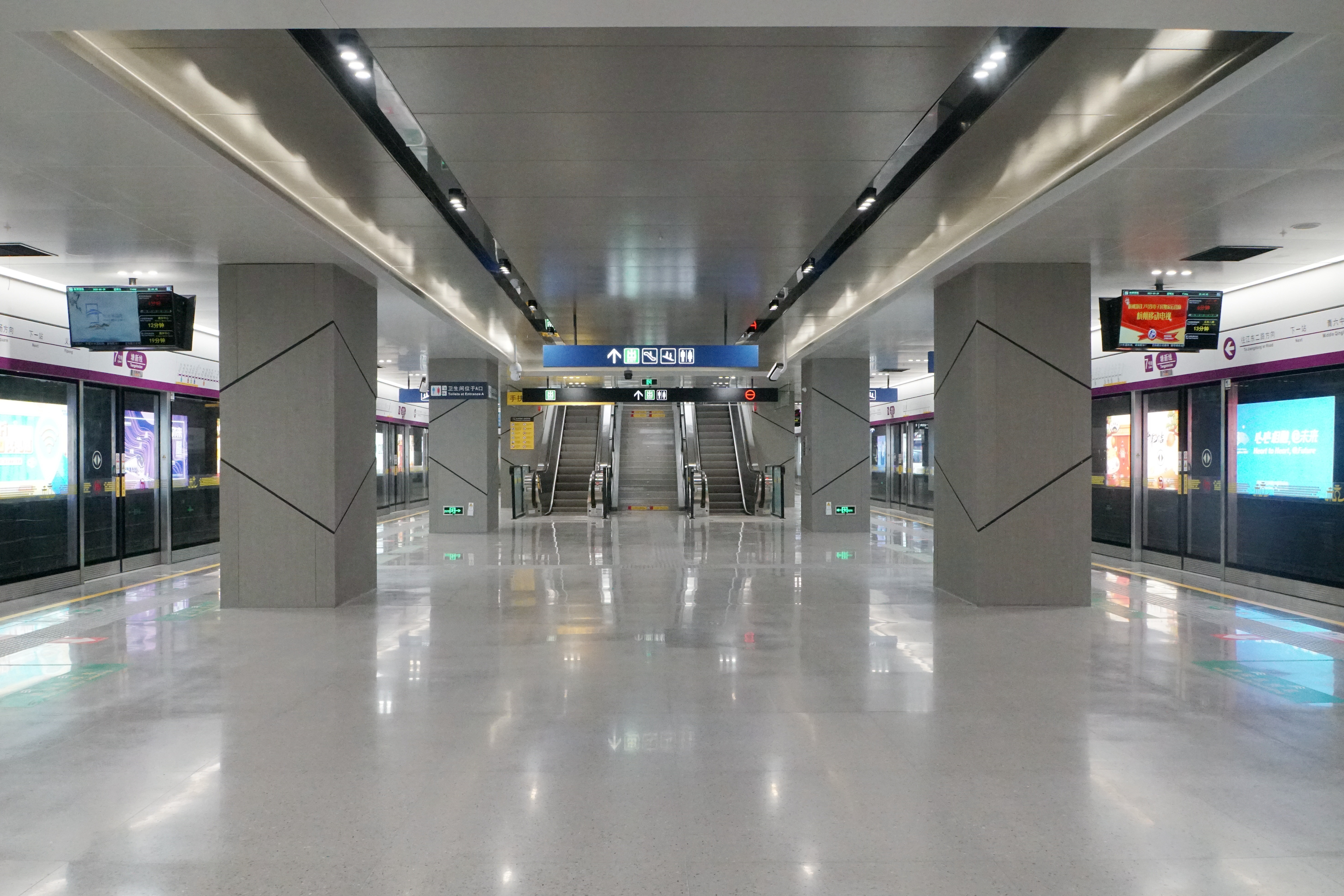
Platform view
