= Xinwan Road station =

Metro station in Hangzhou, China

Xinwan Road 新湾路
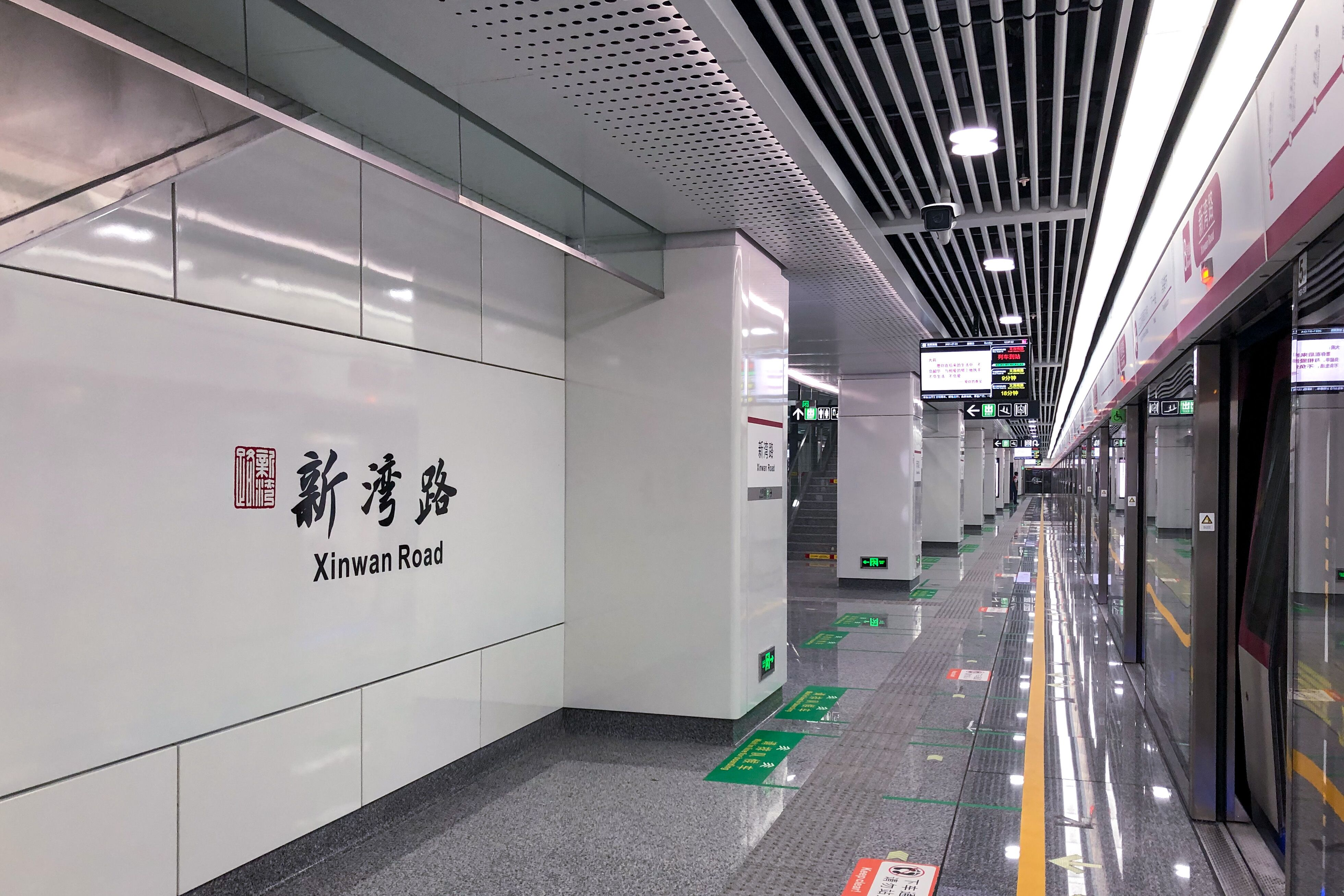

General information
- Location: Qiantang District, Hangzhou, Zhejiang; China
- Coordinates: 30.29724°N 120.53588°E
- Operated by: Hangzhou Metro Corporation
- Line(s): Line 8
- Platforms: 2 (1 island platform)

History
- Opened: 28 June 2021

Services
Preceding station	Hangzhou Metro	Following station
Fengloucun towards South Wenhai Road	Line 8	Terminus

Xinwan Road (Chinese: 新湾路) is the east terminus of Line 8 of the Hangzhou Metro in China. Opened on 28 June 2021, it is located in the Qiantang District of Hangzhou.

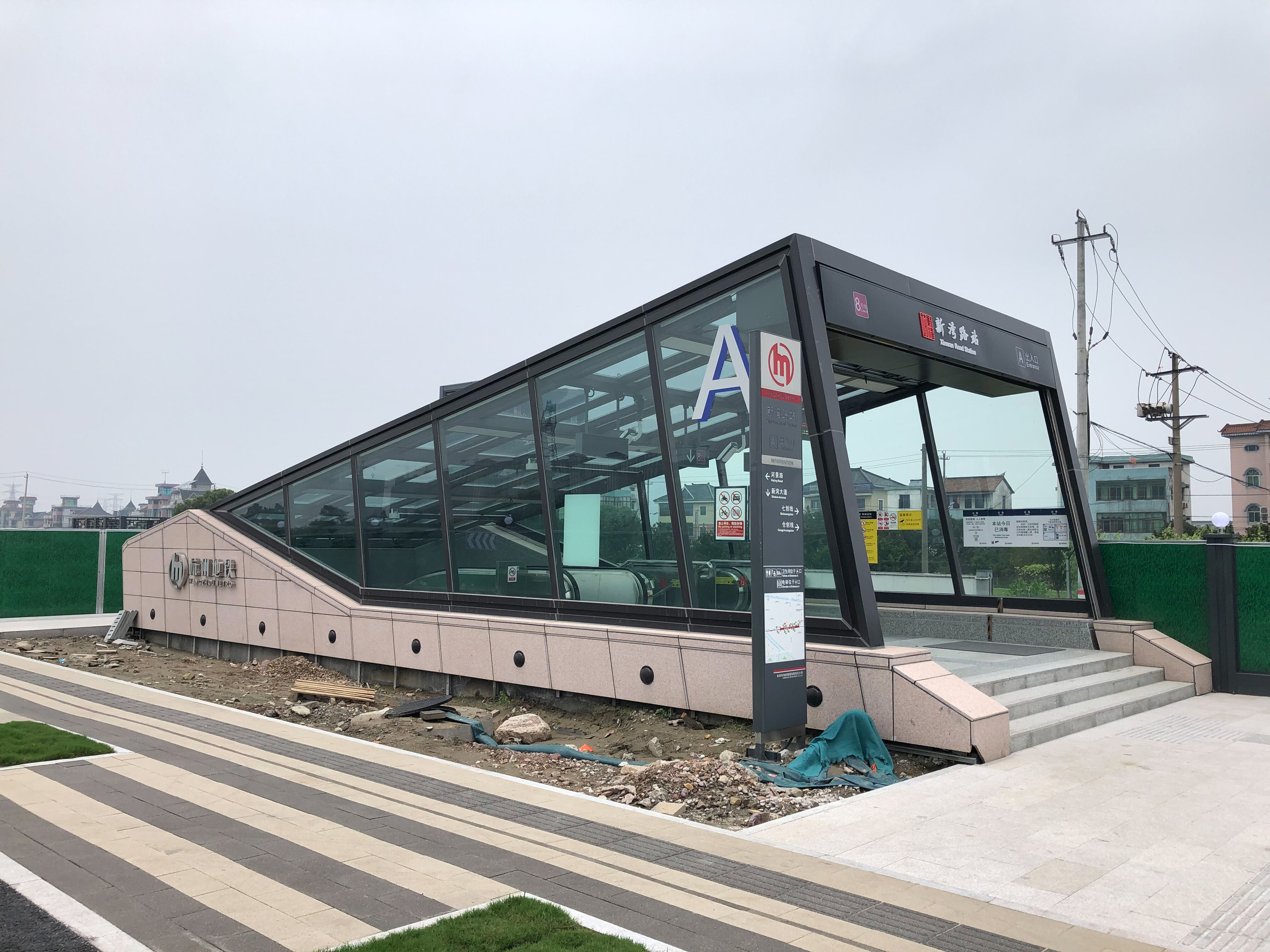
Entrance A
