= South Wenhai Road station =

Hangzhou Metro station

South Wenhai Road 文海南路
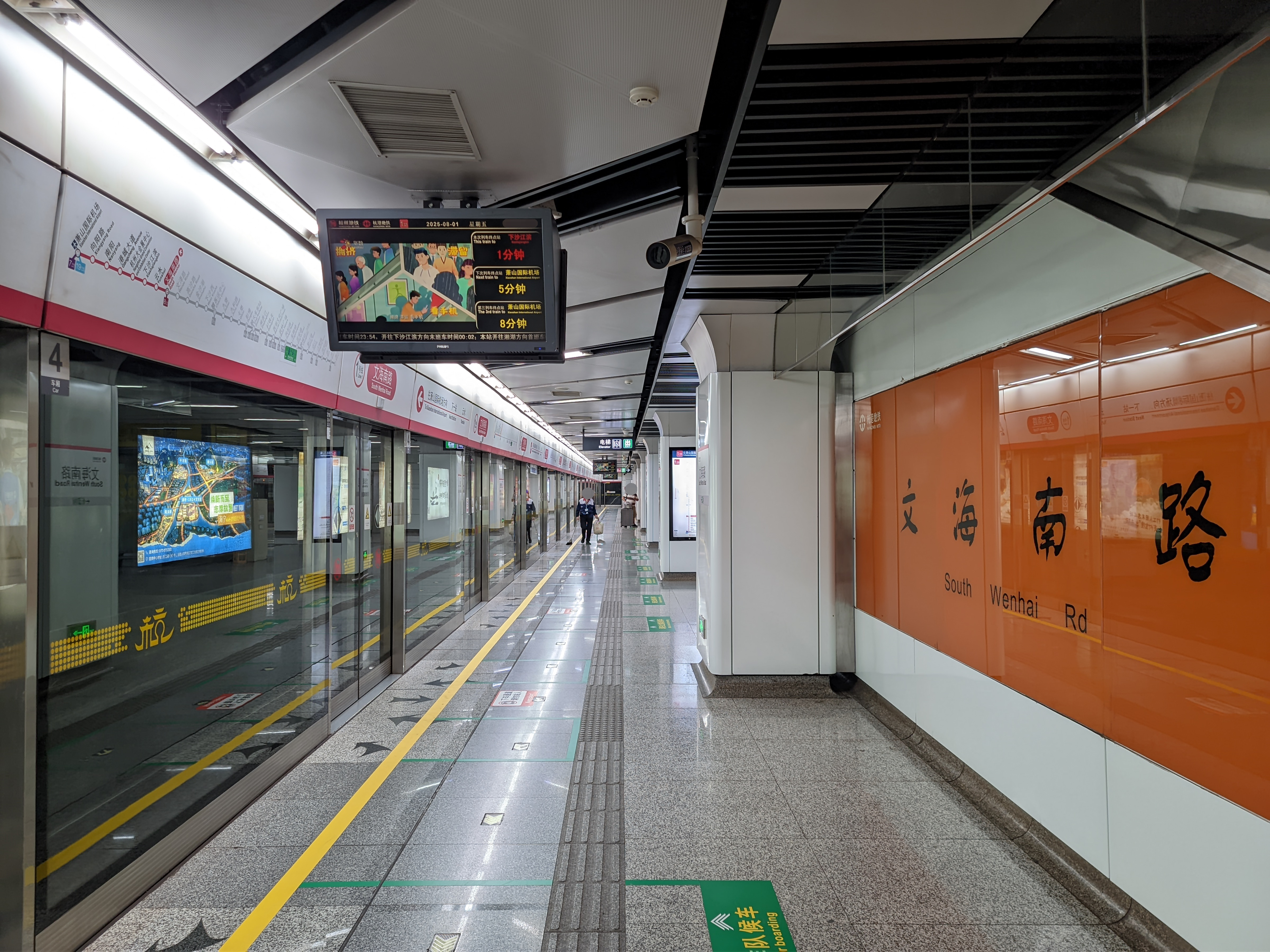
- Platform of Line 1

General information
- Location: No.2 Street × No.23 Street & Wenhai Road (S); Qiantang District, Hangzhou, Zhejiang; China
- Coordinates: 30°19′N 120°22′E
- System: Hangzhou metro station
- Operator: Hangzhou MTR Corporation; Hangzhou Metro Corporation
- Lines: Line 1; Line 8
- Platforms: 4 (2 island platforms)

Construction
- Structure type: Underground
- Accessible: Yes

History
- Opened: 24 November 2015 (Line 1); 28 June 2021 (Line 8)

Services
Preceding station	Hangzhou Metro	Following station
Wenze Road towards Xianghu	Line 1	Yunshui towards Xiaoshan International Airport
Terminus	Line 8	Gongshang University Yunbin towards Xinwan Road
Location

South Wenhai Road (Chinese: 文海南路) is a station on Line 1 and Line 8 of the Hangzhou Metro in China. It was opened on 24 November 2015, together with the expanded section of Line 1. The Line 8 was opened on 28 June 2021. It is located in the Qiantang District of Hangzhou.

== Station layout ==
South Wenhai Road has two levels: a concourse, and two separated island platforms for lines 1 and 8. Each of these consists of two tracks.

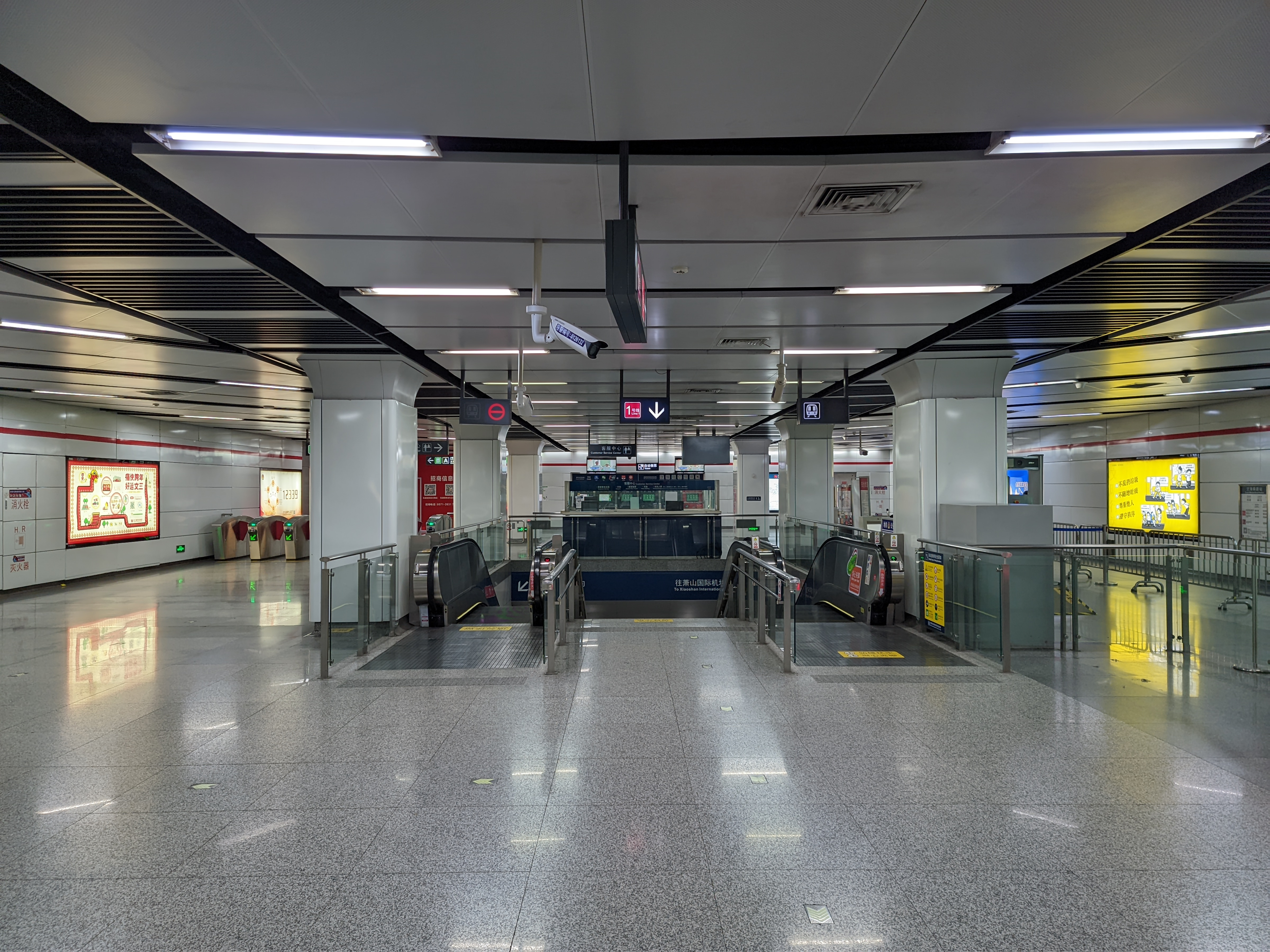
Line 1 concourse

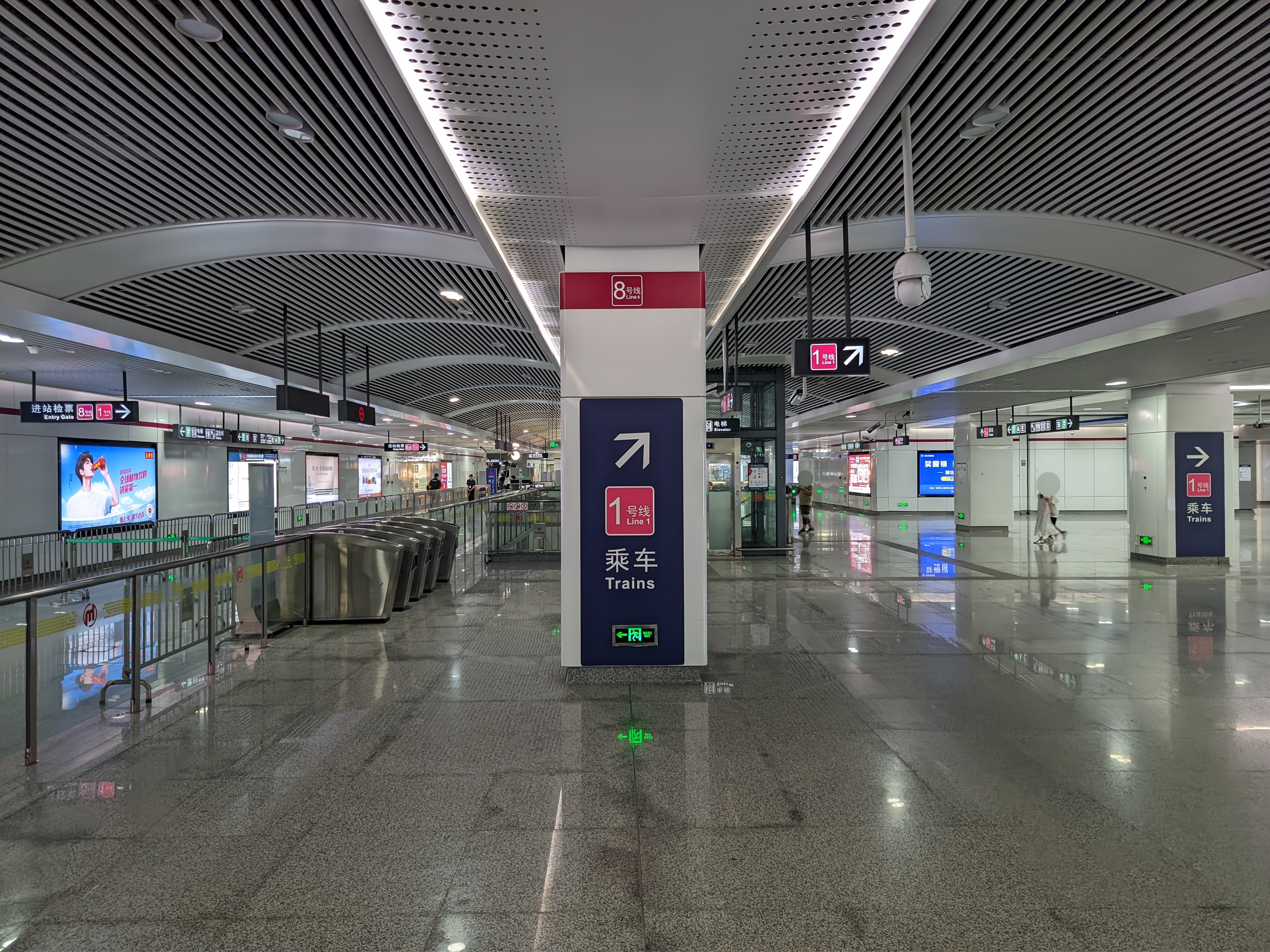
Line 8 concourse

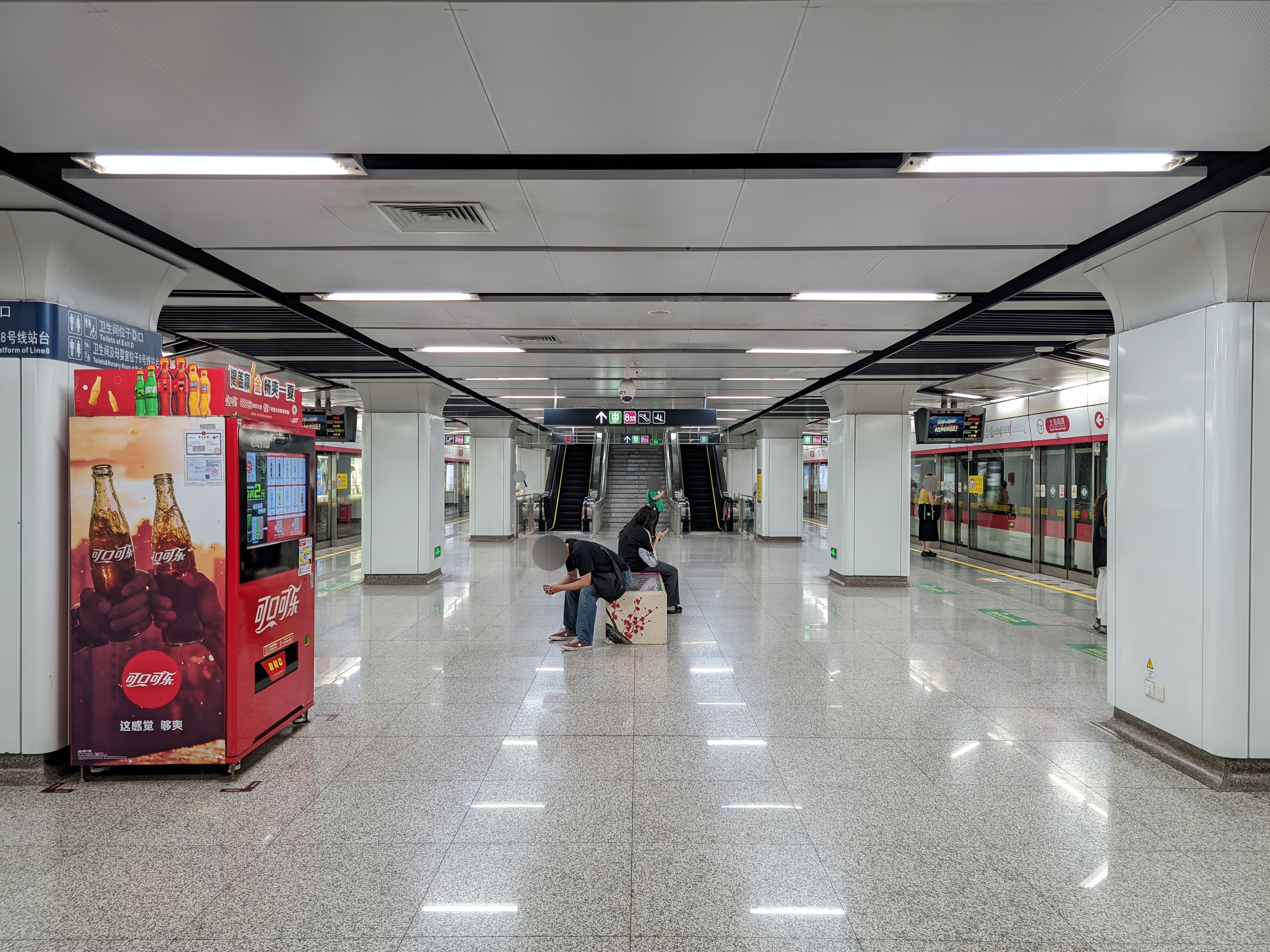
Line 1 platforms

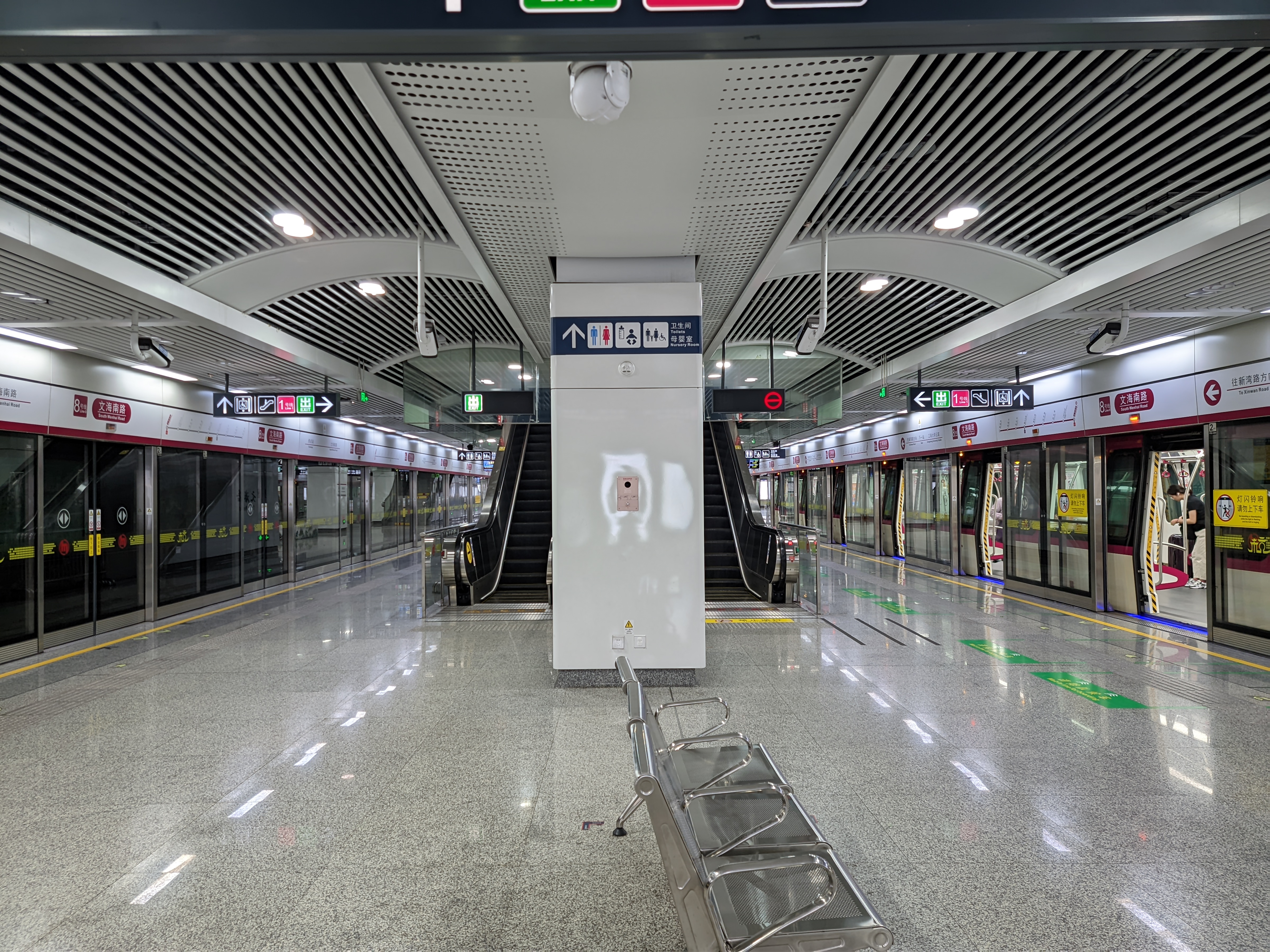
Line 8 platforms

== Entrances/exits ==
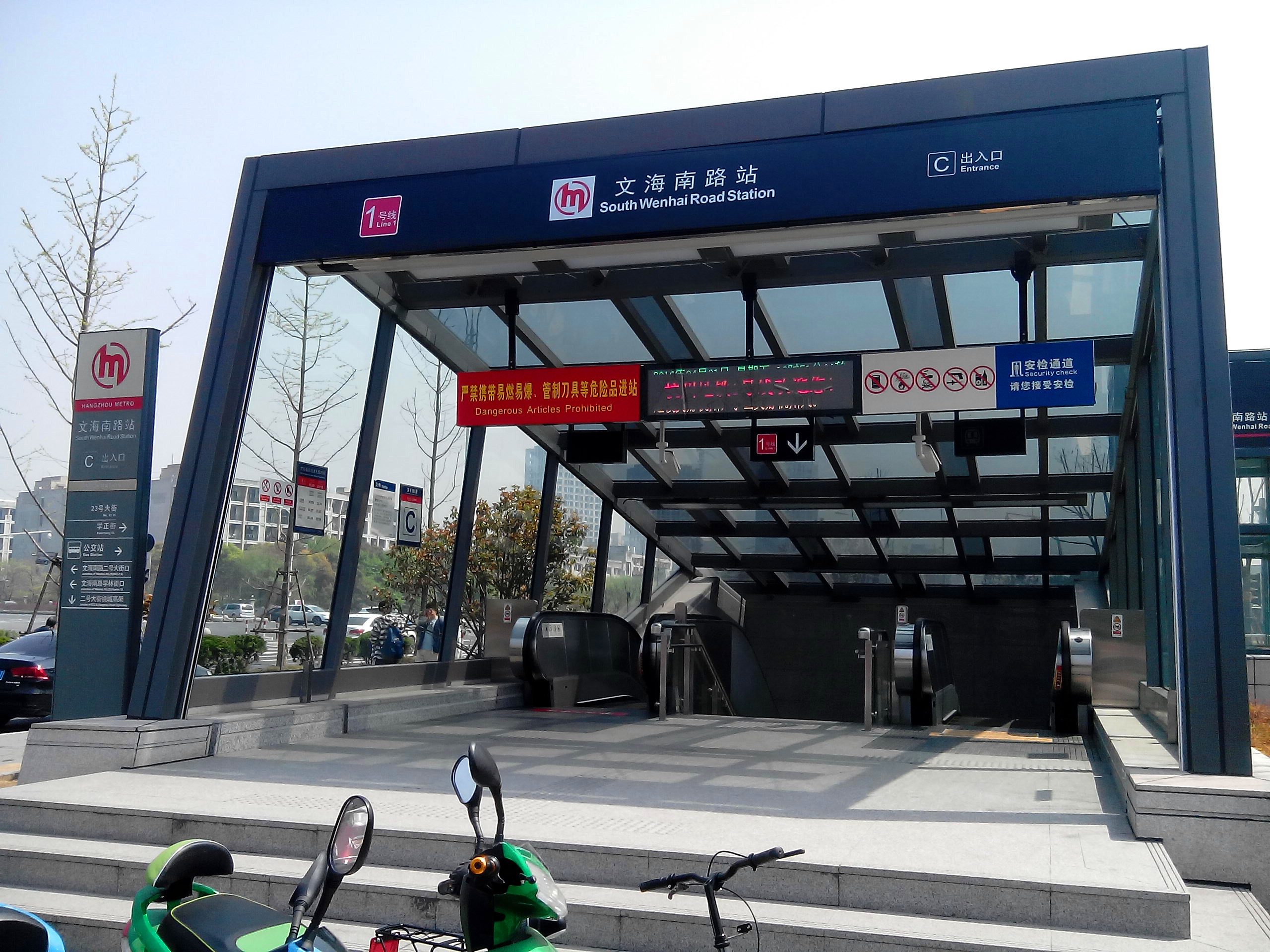

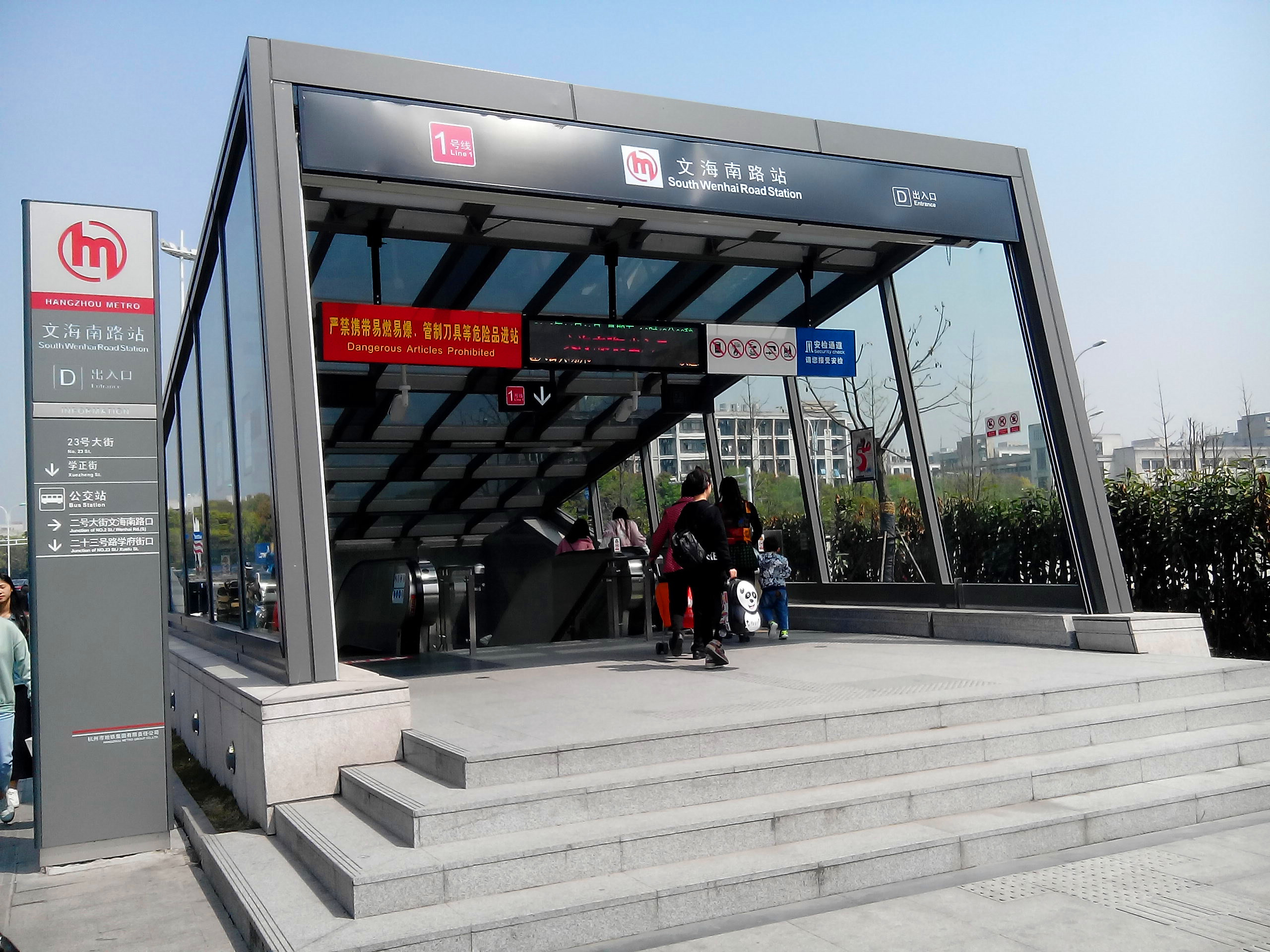
Exits D and E in 2016, which labelled as C and D

There are four entrances in service. Exits D and E were labelled as C and D before line 8 opened.

- A: north side of No.2 Street, east side of Wenhai Road (S)
- B: Zhejiang University of Water Resources and Electric Power
- D: Dandelion Plaza
- E: Zhejiang Technical Institute of Economic
