= Hangfachang station =

Hangzhou Metro station

Coordinates: 30°10′22″N 120°15′44″E

Hangfachang 杭发厂
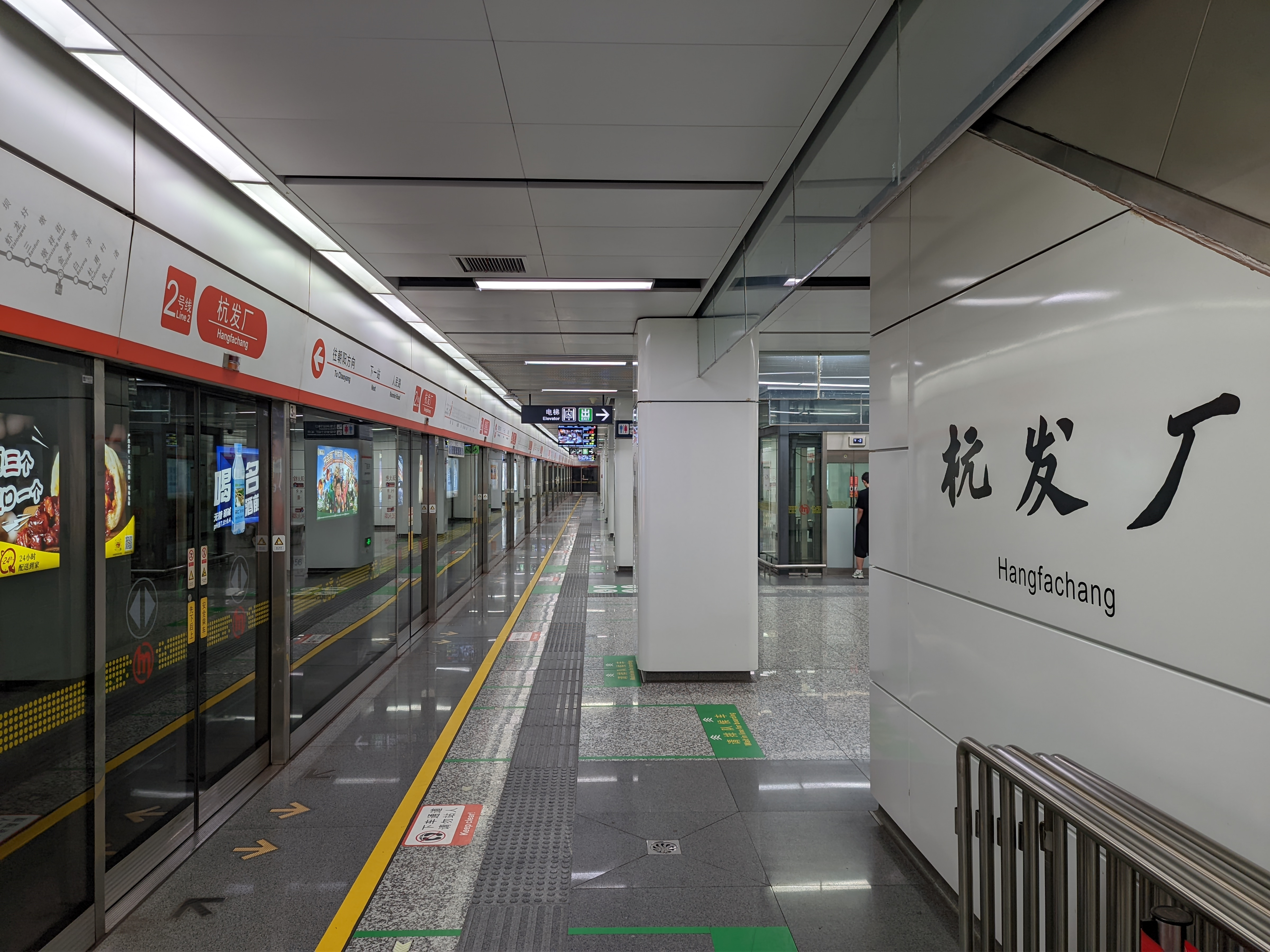
- Platform

General information
- Location: Xiaoshan District, Hangzhou, Zhejiang; China
- Operated by: Hangzhou Metro Corporation
- Line: Line 2

History
- Opened: November 24, 2014

Services
Preceding station	Hangzhou Metro	Following station
Renmin Road towards Chaoyang	Line 2	People's Square towards Liangzhu
Location

Hangfachang (Chinese: 杭发厂) is a metro station on Line 2 of the Hangzhou Metro in China. It is located in the Xiaoshan District of Hangzhou. This station has four exits.
