= Renmin Road station =

Hangzhou Metro station

Coordinates: 30°09′41″N 120°15′47″E

Renmin Road 人民路
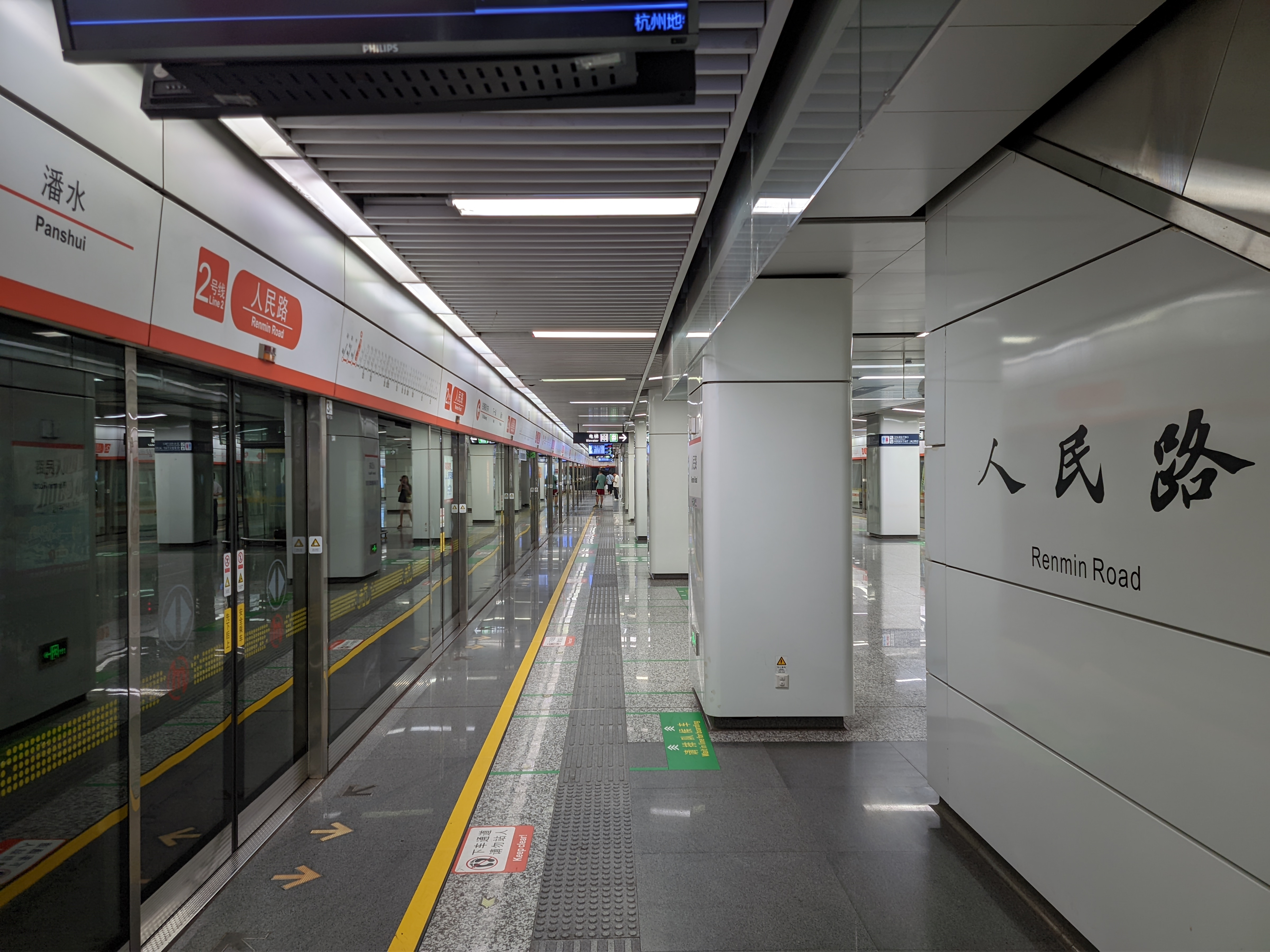
- Platform

General information
- Location: Xiaoshan District, Hangzhou, Zhejiang; China
- Operated by: Hangzhou Metro Corporation
- Line: Line 2

History
- Opened: November 24, 2014

Services
Preceding station	Hangzhou Metro	Following station
Panshui towards Chaoyang	Line 2	Hangfachang towards Liangzhu
Location

Renmin Road (Chinese: 人民路) is a metro station on Line 2 of the Hangzhou Metro in China. It is located in the Xiaoshan District of Hangzhou. This station has three exits.
