= Panshui station =

Hangzhou Metro station

Coordinates: 30°09′03″N 120°15′48″E

Panshui 潘水
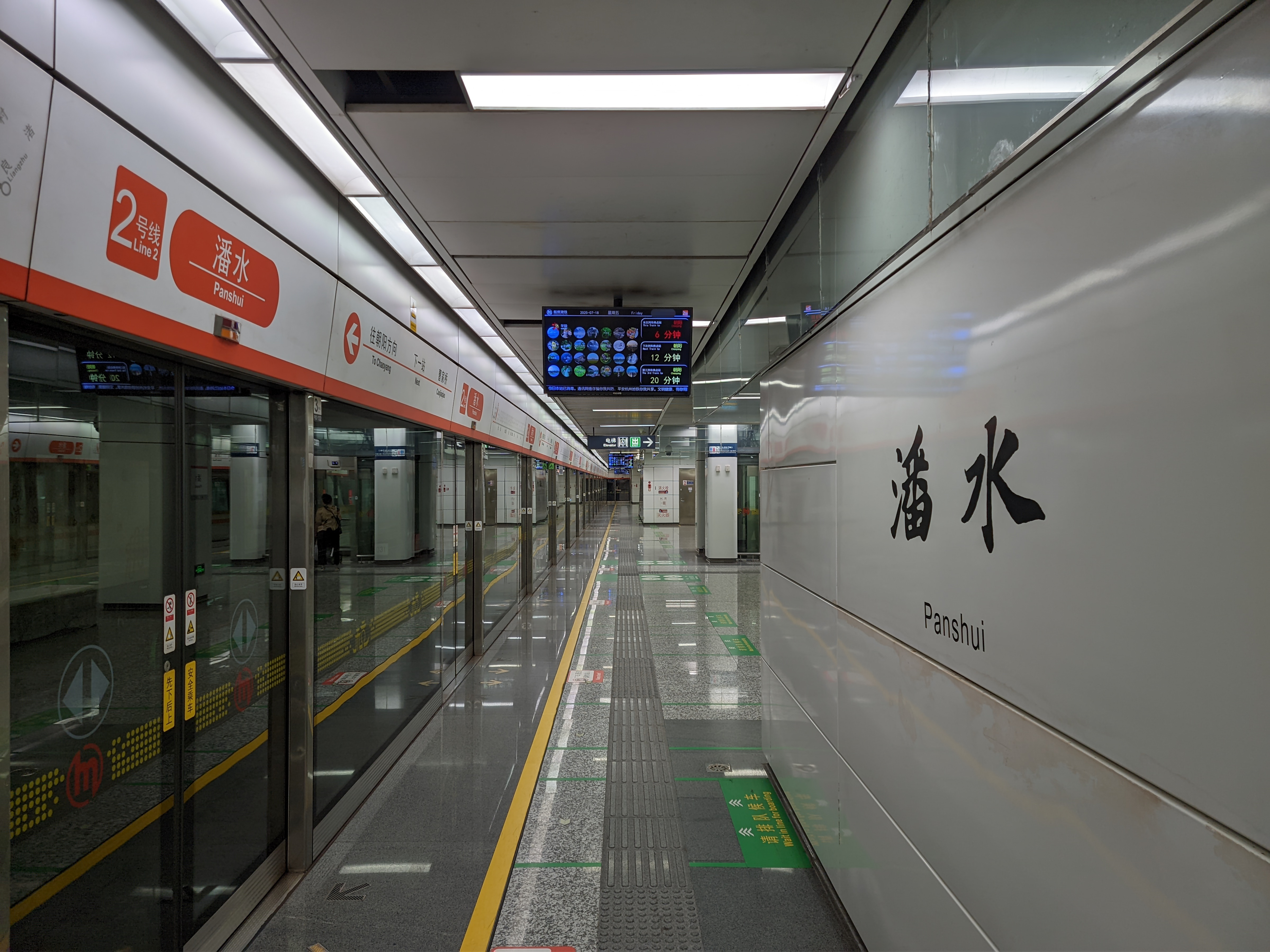
- Platform

General information
- Location: Xiaoshan District, Hangzhou, Zhejiang; China
- Operated by: Hangzhou Metro Corporation
- Line: Line 2

History
- Opened: November 24, 2014

Services
Preceding station	Hangzhou Metro	Following station
Caojiaqiao towards Chaoyang	Line 2	Renmin Road towards Liangzhu
Location

Panshui (Chinese: 潘水) is a metro station on Line 2 of the Hangzhou Metro in China. It is located in the Xiaoshan District of Hangzhou. This station has two exits.
