= Wan'an Bridge station =

Metro station in Hangzhou, China

Wan'an Bridge 万安桥
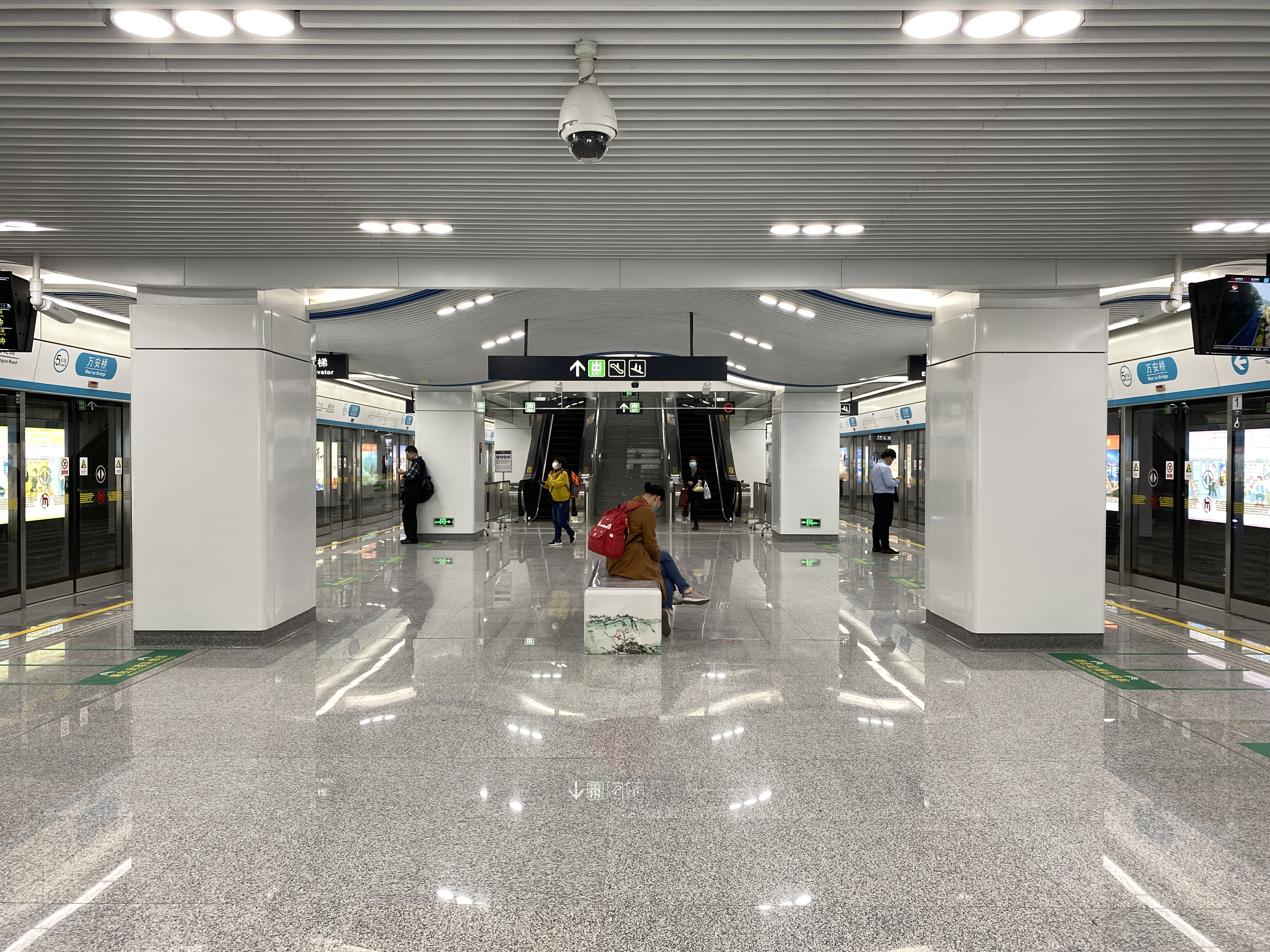
- Platform

General information
- Location: Jianguo Road (M); Shangcheng District, Hangzhou, Zhejiang; China
- Coordinates: 30.2566°N 120.1759°E
- System: Hangzhou metro station
- Operator: Hangzhou MTR Line 5 Corporation
- Line: Line 5
- Platforms: 2 (1 island platform)

Construction
- Structure type: Underground
- Accessible: Yes

History
- Opened: April 23, 2020

Services
Preceding station	Hangzhou Metro	Following station
North Jianguo Road towards East Nanhu	Line 5	Chengzhan towards Guniangqiao
Location

Wan'an Bridge (simplified Chinese: 万安桥; traditional Chinese: 萬安橋) is a metro station on Line 5 of the Hangzhou Metro in China. It is located in the Shangcheng District of Hangzhou.

== Station layout ==
The station has an island platform.

G	Ground level	Exits
B1	Concourse	Tickets, Customer Service Center, Convenient stores
B2	Platforms	← Line 5 towards East Nanhu (North Jianguo Road)
B2	Platforms	Island Platform, doors will open on the left
B2	Platforms	Line 5 towards Guniangqiao (Chengzhan) →

== Entrances/exits ==
- B: east side of Jianguo Road (M), Qingchun Road
- C: west side of Jianguo Road (M), Qingchun Road
- D: west side of Jianguo Road (M), Jiefang Road
- E: east side of Jianguo Road (M), Jiefang Road
