= Middle Tonghui Road station =

Metro station in China

Middle Tonghui Road 通惠中路
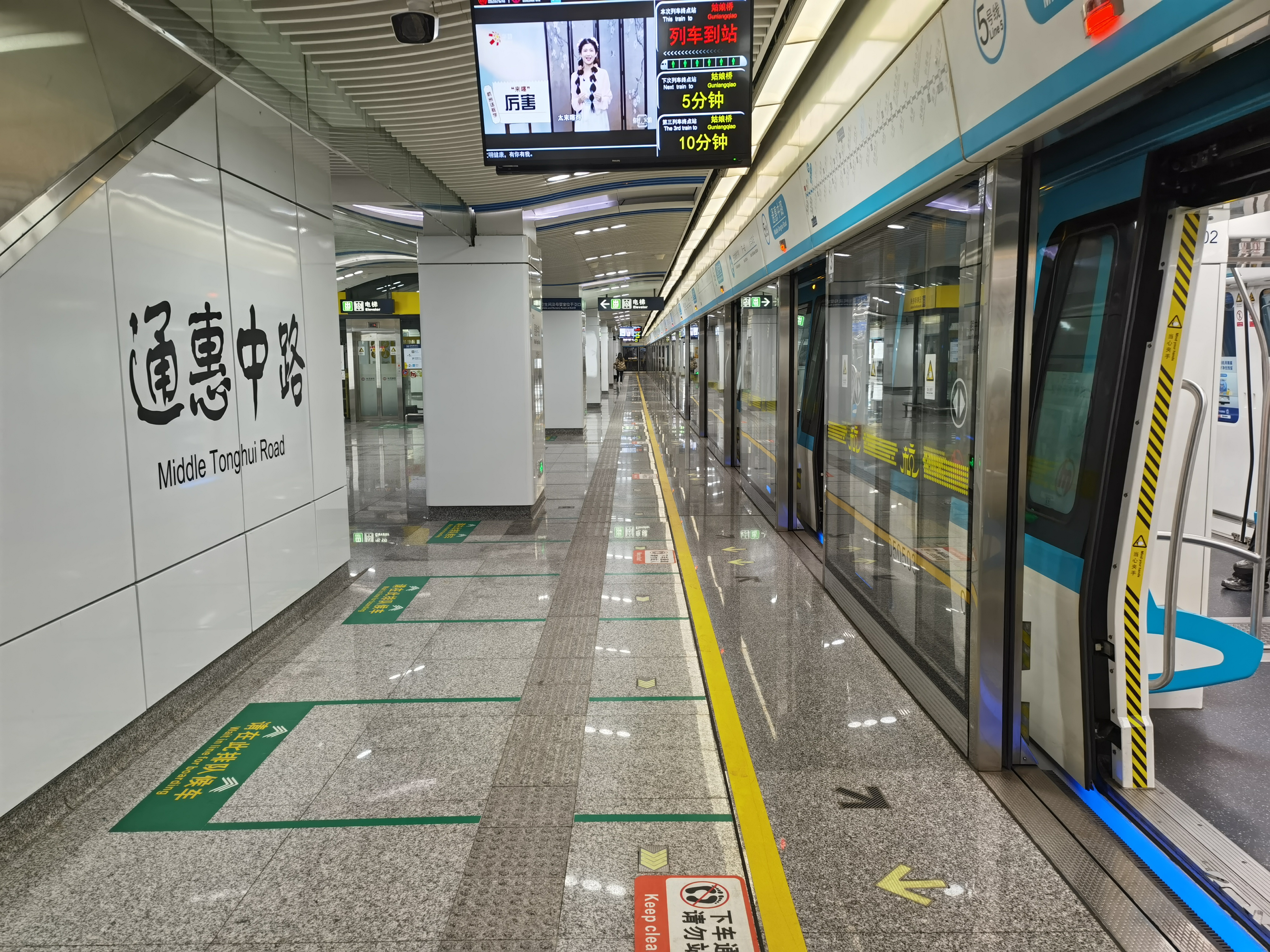

General information
- Location: Jincheng Road × Tonghui Road (M); Xiaoshan District, Hangzhou, Zhejiang; China
- Coordinates: 30°10′58″N 120°16′51″E
- System: Hangzhou metro station
- Operator: Hangzhou MTR Line 5 Corporation
- Line: Line 5
- Platforms: 2 (1 island platform)

Construction
- Structure type: Underground
- Accessible: Yes

History
- Opened: April 23, 2020

Services
Preceding station	Hangzhou Metro	Following station
North Yucai Road towards East Nanhu	Line 5	South Railway Station towards Guniangqiao
Location

Middle Tonghui Road (Chinese: 通惠中路) is a metro station on Line 5 of the Hangzhou Metro in China. It is located in the Xiaoshan District of Hangzhou.

== Station layout ==
Middle Tonghui Road has two levels: a concourse, and an island platform with two tracks for line 5.

== Entrances/exits ==
- A: Shunhe Yuefu Community
- B: Waterfront Mansion
- C: Jiarui Plaza
- D: Yaochen Mansion
