= Baoshan Bridge station =

Metro station in China

Baoshan Bridge 宝善桥
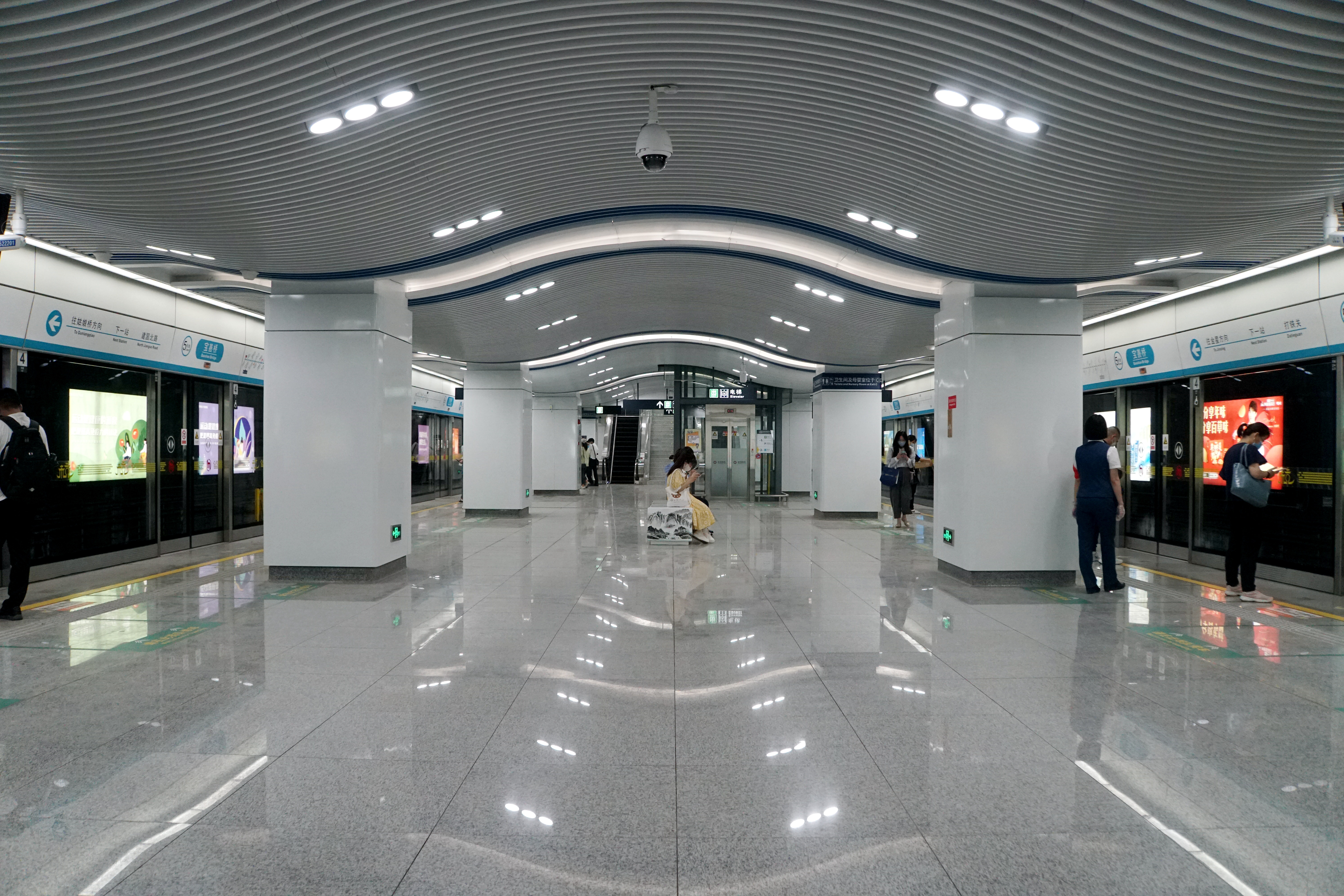
- Platform

General information
- Location: Jianguo Rd. (N) × Moyaying; Gongshu District, Hangzhou, Zhejiang; China
- Coordinates: 30.27426°N 120.17517°E
- Operated by: Hangzhou MTR Line 5 Corporation Limited
- Line: Line 5
- Platforms: 2 (1 island platform)

History
- Opened: March 1, 2022

Services
Preceding station	Hangzhou Metro	Following station
Datieguan towards East Nanhu	Line 5	North Jianguo Road towards Guniangqiao
Location

Baoshan Bridge (Chinese: 宝善桥) is a metro station on Line 5 of the Hangzhou Metro in China. It is located in the Gongshu District of Hangzhou.

== Station layout ==
Baoshan Bridge has three levels: a concourse, an equipment area, and an island platform with two tracks for line 5.

== Entrances/exits ==
- A1 & A2: west side of Jianguo Rd. (N)
- B1 & B2: west side of Jianguo Rd. (N), Tiyuchang Rd.
- C: Moyaying
