= North Yucai Road station =

Metro station in China

North Yucai Road 育才北路
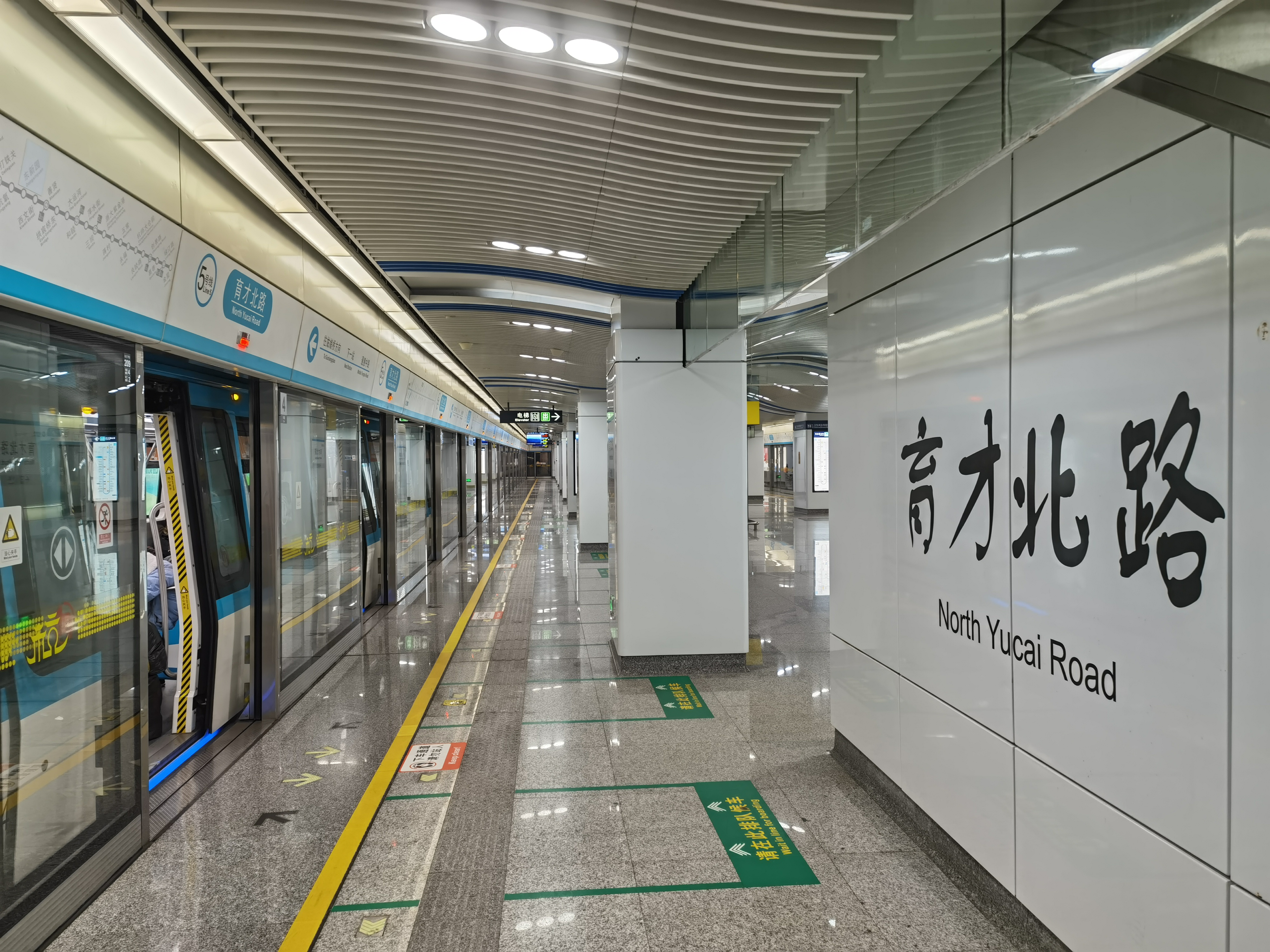
- Platform

General information
- Location: Jincheng Road × Yucai Road (N); Xiaoshan District, Hangzhou, Zhejiang; China
- Coordinates: 30°11′00″N 120°16′23″E
- System: Hangzhou metro station
- Operator: Hangzhou MTR Line 5 Corporation
- Line: Line 5
- Platforms: 2 (1 island platform)

Construction
- Structure type: Underground
- Accessible: Yes

History
- Opened: April 23, 2020

Services
Preceding station	Hangzhou Metro	Following station
People's Square towards East Nanhu	Line 5	Middle Tonghui Road towards Guniangqiao
Location

North Yucai Road (Chinese: 育才北路) is a metro station on Line 5 of the Hangzhou Metro in China. It is located in the Xiaoshan District of Hangzhou.

== Station layout ==
North Yucai Road has two levels: a concourse, and an island platform with two tracks for line 5.

== Entrances/exits ==
- A: north side of Jincheng Road
- B: Beigan Street Office
- C1: Yintong Building
- C2: Jinyuan Building
- C3: Jinlaijie
- C4: Xiaoshan Water Building
- E: Feiniaoji Apartment
