= Dongxinyuan station =

Metro station in Hangzhou, China

Dongxinyuan 东新园
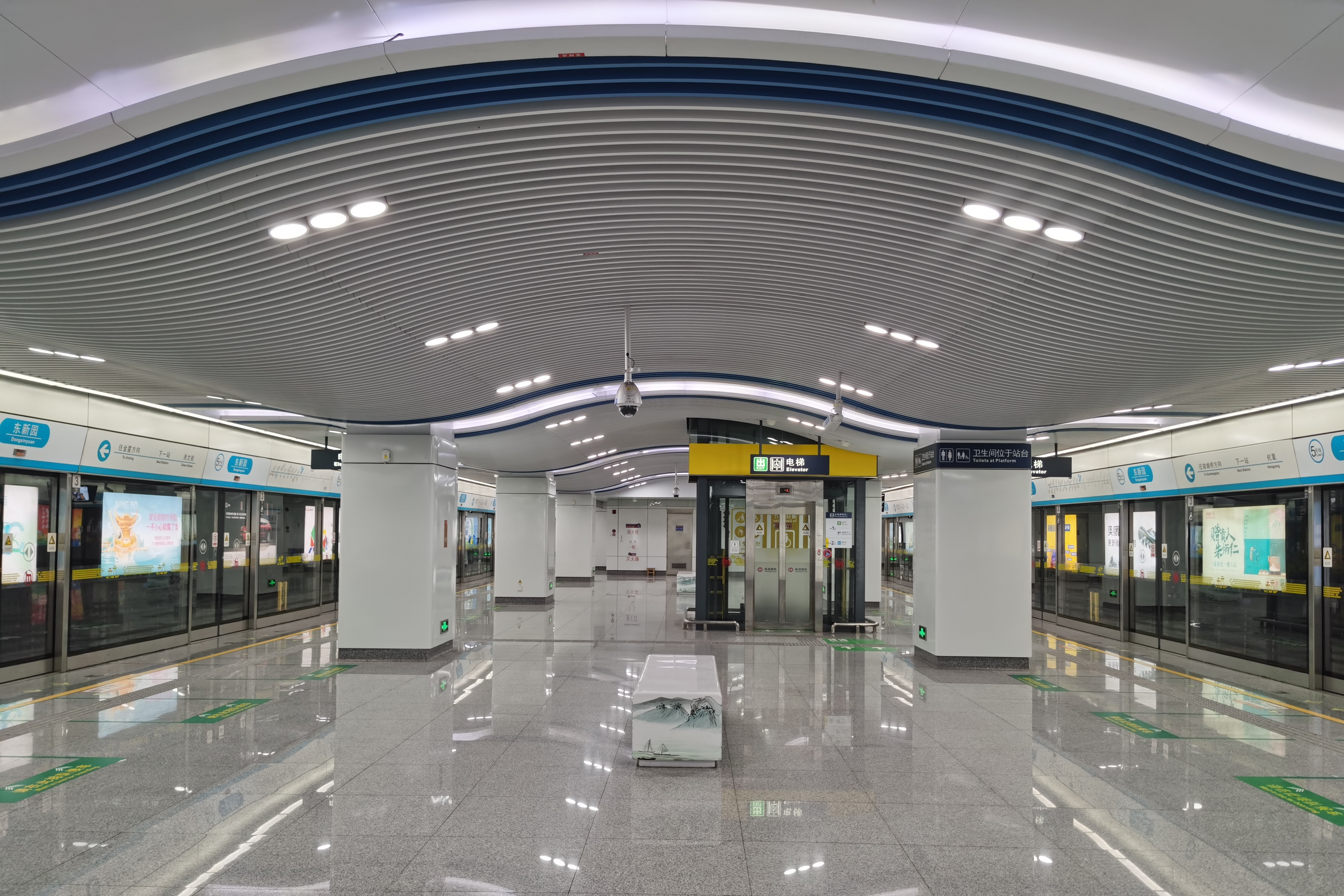
- Platform

General information
- Location: Dongxin Road × Xiangjisi Road & Xiangjisi Road (E); Gongshu District, Hangzhou, Zhejiang; China
- Coordinates: 30.3106°N 120.1712°E
- System: Hangzhou metro station
- Operator: Hangzhou MTR Line 5 Corporation
- Line: Line 5
- Platforms: 2 (1 island platform)

Construction
- Structure type: Underground
- Accessible: Yes

History
- Opened: April 23, 2020

Services
Preceding station	Hangzhou Metro	Following station
Xiwen Street towards East Nanhu	Line 5	Hangyang towards Guniangqiao
Route map
Location

Dongxinyuan (simplified Chinese: 东新园; traditional Chinese: 東新園; pinyin: Dōngxīnyuán), formerly known as Xiangjisi Road (simplified Chinese: 香积寺路; traditional Chinese: 香積寺路), is a metro station on Line 5 of the Hangzhou Metro in China. It is located in the Gongshu District of Hangzhou.

== Station layout ==
Dongxinyuan has two levels: a concourse, and an island platform with two tracks for line 5.

== Entrances/exits ==
- A: Dongxinyuan Community
- B: west side of Dongxin Rd.
- C: west side of Dongxin Rd.
- D: east side of Dongxin Rd.
