= Jianghui Road station =

Metro station in China

Jianghui Road 江晖路
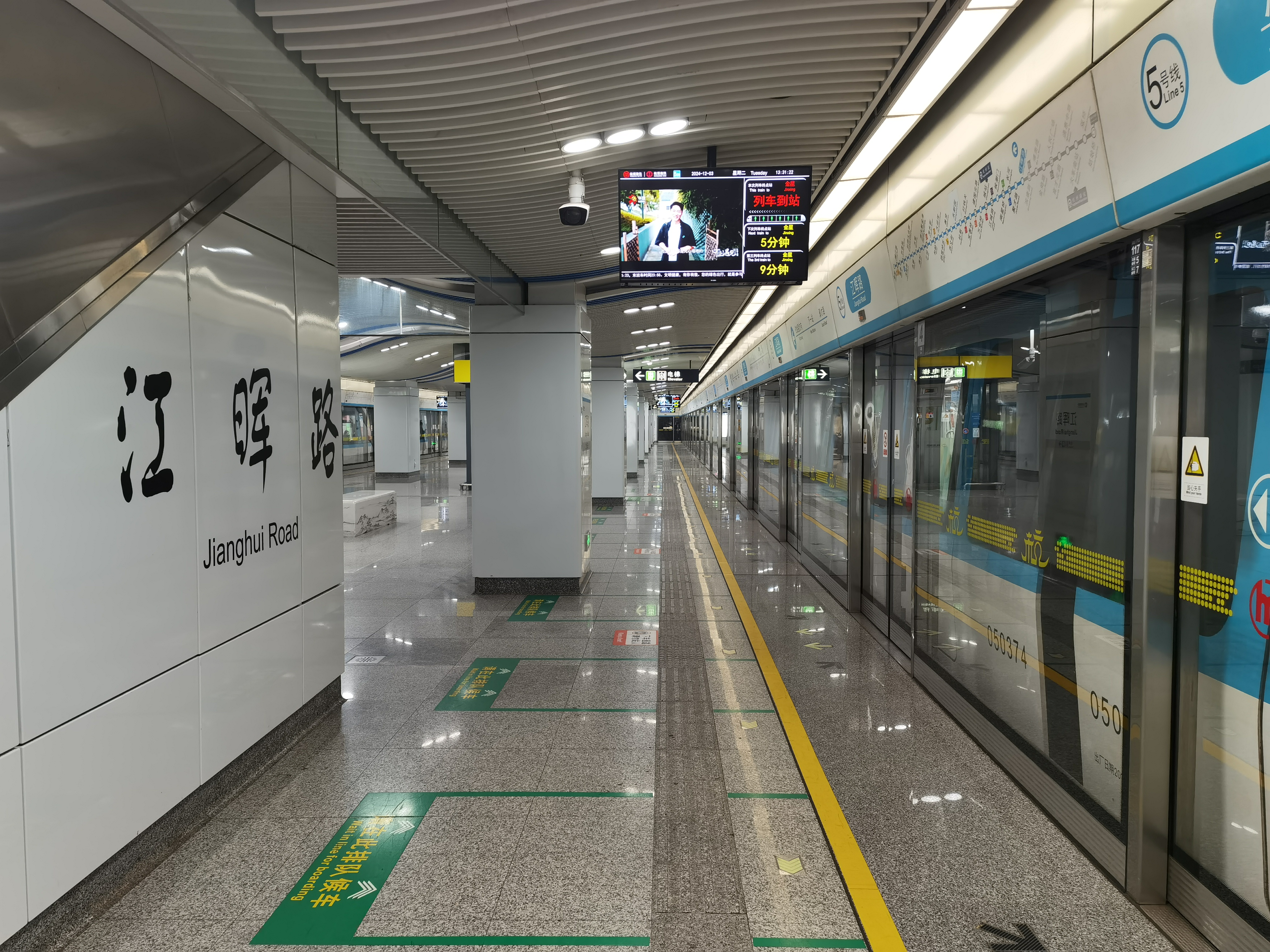

General information
- Location: Binkang Road × Jianghui Road; Binjiang District, Hangzhou, Zhejiang; China
- Coordinates: 30.183939°N 120.206528°E
- System: Hangzhou metro station
- Operator: Hangzhou MTR Line 5 Corporation
- Line: Line 5
- Platforms: 2 (1 island platform)

Construction
- Structure type: Underground
- Accessible: Yes

History
- Opened: April 23, 2020

Services
Preceding station	Hangzhou Metro	Following station
Jucai Road towards East Nanhu	Line 5	Binkang Road towards Guniangqiao
Location

Jianghui Road (simplified Chinese: 江晖路; traditional Chinese: 江暉路) is a metro station on Line 5 of the Hangzhou Metro in China. It is located in the Binjiang District of Hangzhou.

== Station layout ==
Jianghui Road has two levels: a concourse, and an island platform with two tracks for line 5.

== Entrances/exits ==
- A1 & A2: north side of Binkang Road, east side of Jianghui Road
- B: Winfun Center
- C1 & C2: Binkang Community
- D: south side of Binkang Road, east side of Jianghui Road
- E1: Longwei Building
- E2: Shengda Sci-tech Park
- E3: Xingye Jiayuan Community
- E4: Springair
