= Xiwen Street station =

Metro station in China

Xiwen Street 西文街
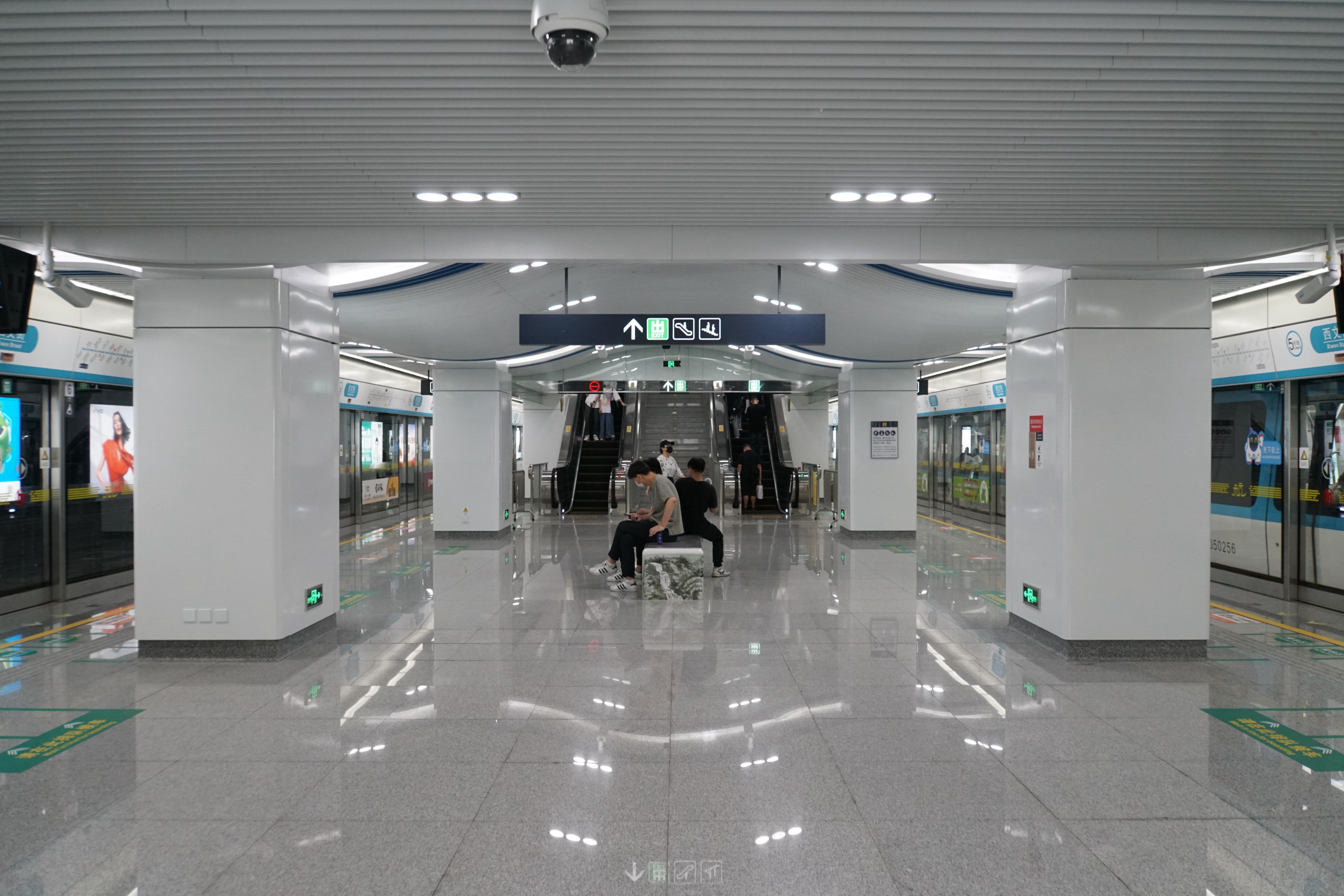

General information
- Location: Xiwen Street × Dengta Alley; Gongshu District, Hangzhou, Zhejiang; China
- Coordinates: 30.318349°N 120.165264°E
- Operator: Hangzhou MTR Line 5 Corporation Limited
- Line: Line 5
- Platforms: 2 (1 island platform)

History
- Opened: April 23, 2020

Services
Preceding station	Hangzhou Metro	Following station
Shanxian towards East Nanhu	Line 5	Dongxinyuan towards Guniangqiao
Location

Xiwen Street (Chinese: 西文街) is a metro station on Line 5 of the Hangzhou Metro in China. It is located in the Gongshu District of Hangzhou.

== Station layout ==
Xiwen Street has two levels: a concourse, and an island platform with two tracks for line 5.

== Entrances/exits ==
- A: north side of Xiwen Street, Dongxin Road
- B: north side of Xiwen Street, Dongxin Road
- C1 & C2: south side of Xiwen Street, Baishi Alley

== Gallery ==
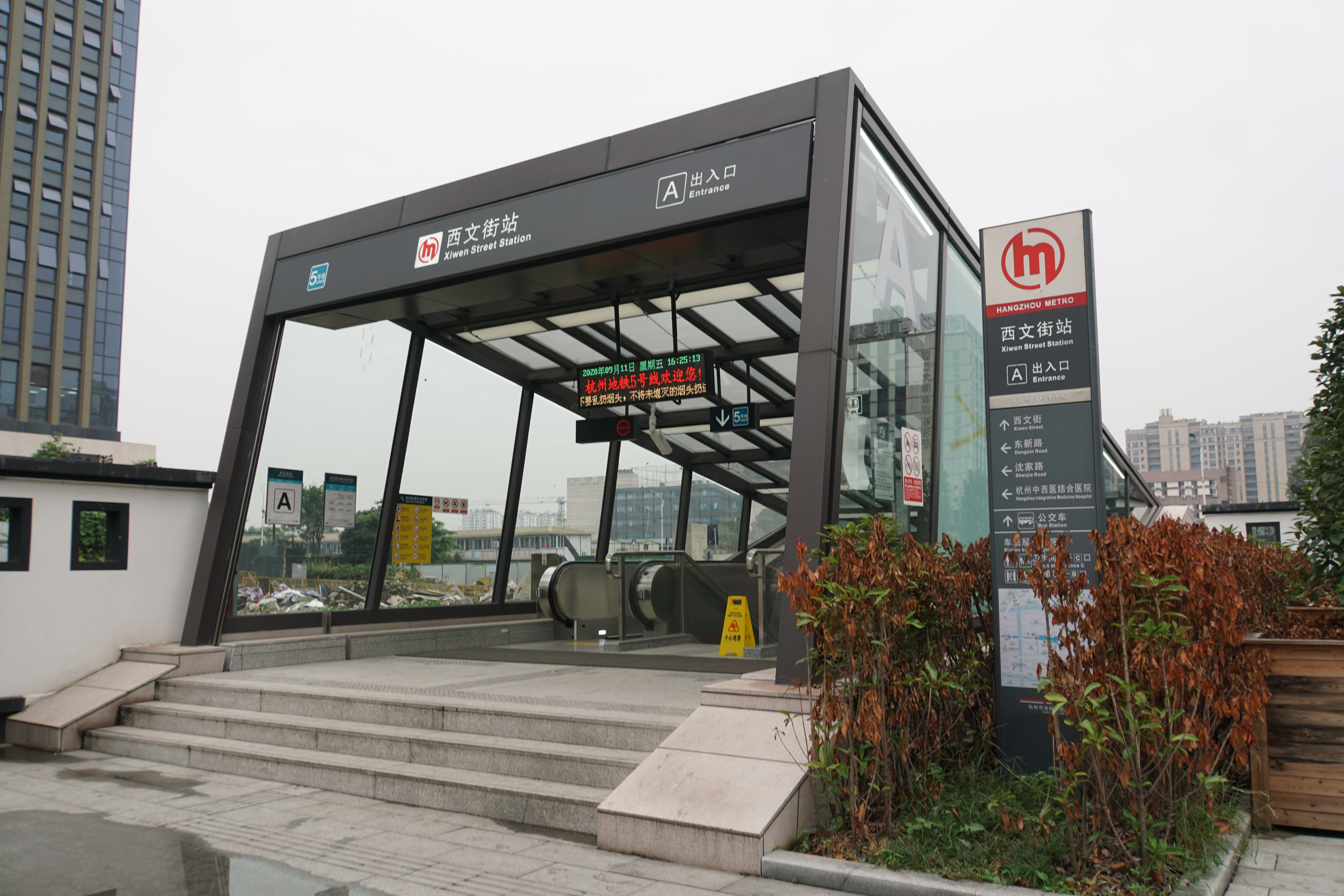
Entrance A

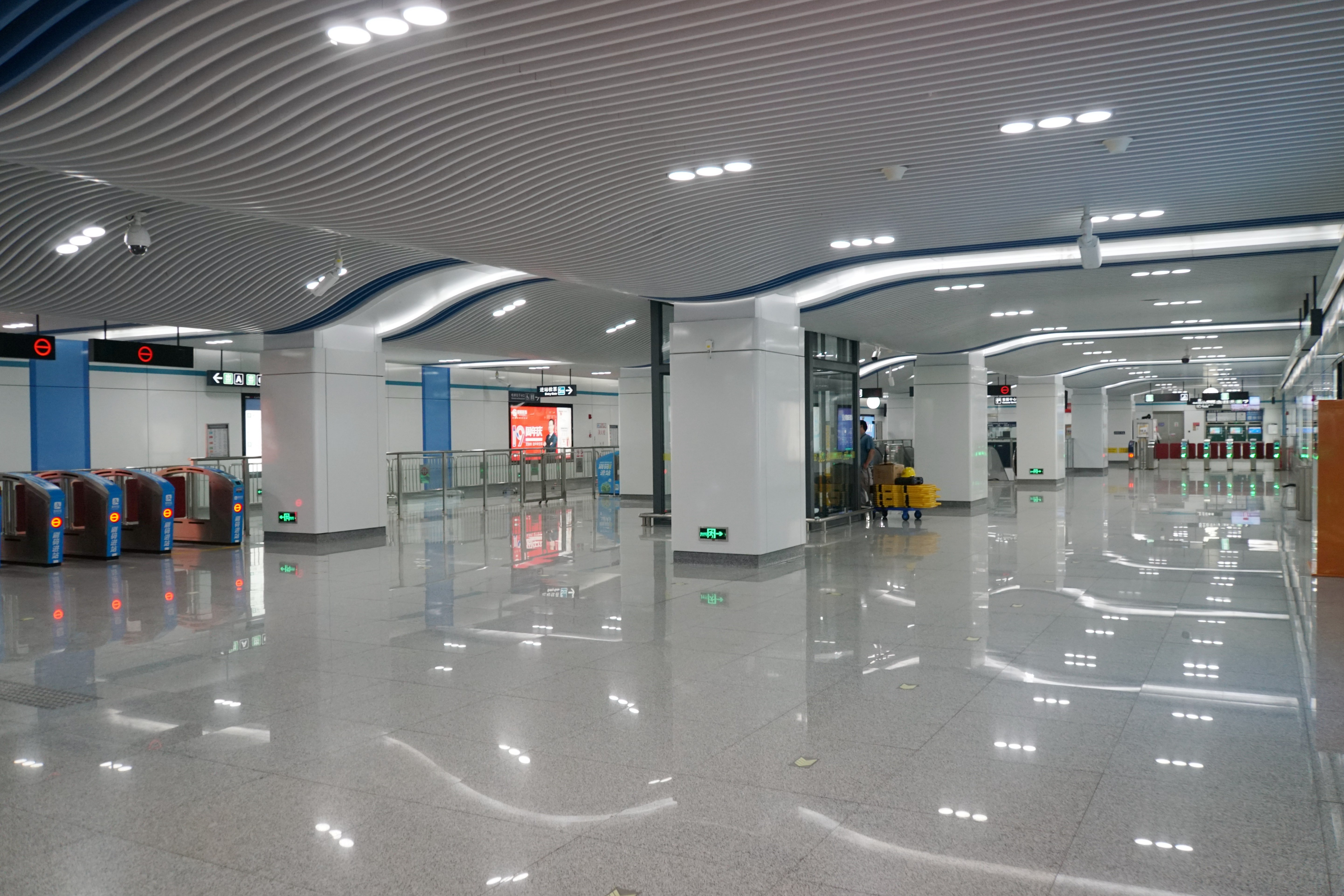
Concourse
