= Hangyang station =

Metro station in China

Hangyang 杭氧
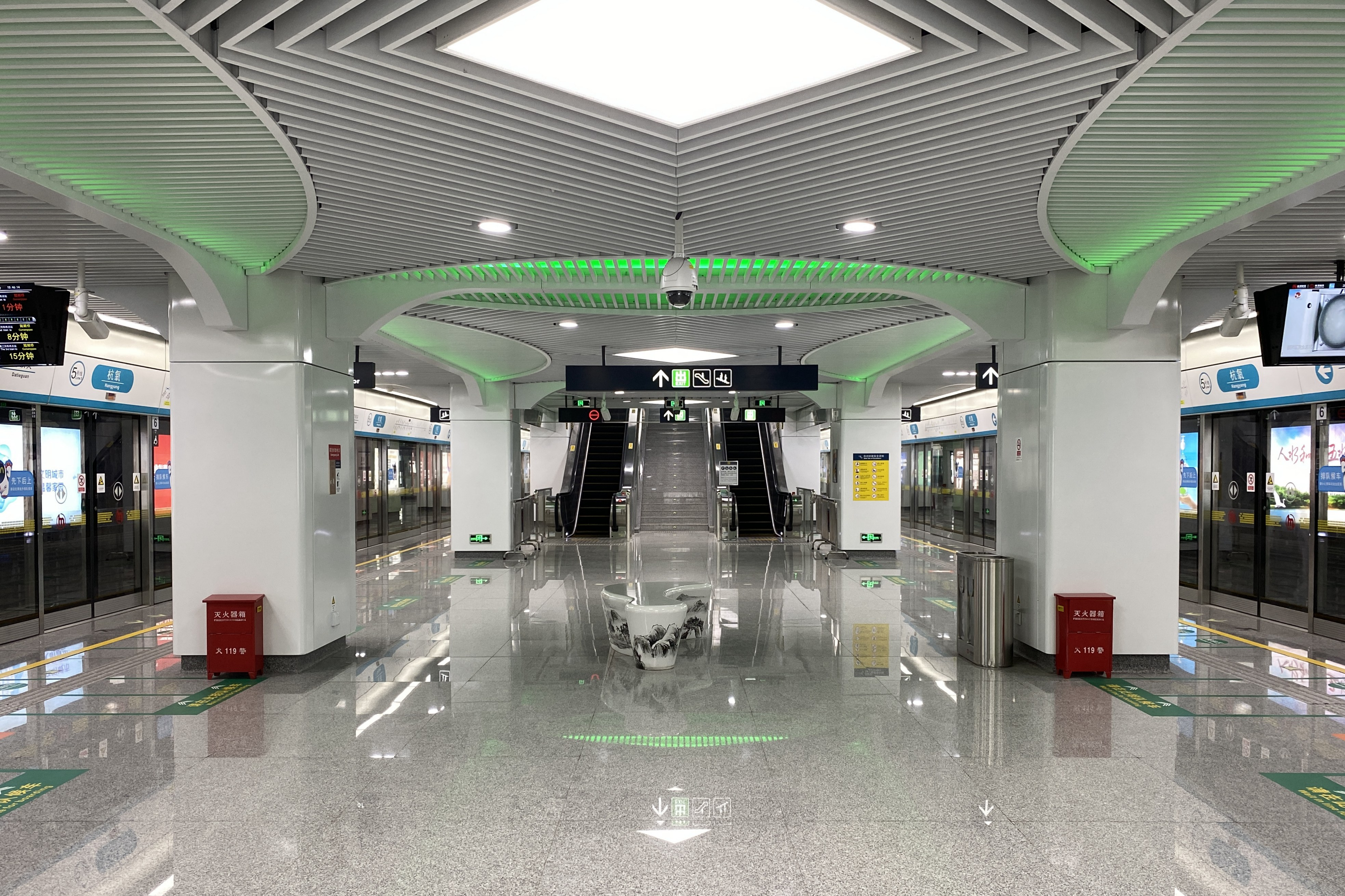
- Platform

General information
- Location: Dongxin Road × Changyue Street; Gongshu District, Hangzhou, Zhejiang; China
- Coordinates: 30.2970°N 120.1743°E
- System: Hangzhou metro station
- Operator: Hangzhou MTR Line 5 Corporation
- Line: Line 5
- Platforms: 2 (1 island platform)

Construction
- Structure type: Underground
- Accessible: Yes

History
- Opened: April 23, 2020

Services
Preceding station	Hangzhou Metro	Following station
Dongxinyuan towards East Nanhu	Line 5	Datieguan towards Guniangqiao
Route map
Location

Hangyang (Chinese: 杭氧) is a metro station on Line 5 of the Hangzhou Metro in China. It is located in the Gongshu District of Hangzhou.

== Station layout ==
Hangyang has two levels: a concourse, and an island platform with two tracks for line 5.

== Entrances/exits ==
- A: east side of Dongxin Road
- C: west side of Dongxin Road, north side of Changyue Street
- E: west side of Dongxin Road, south side of Changyue Street
