= Jucai Road station =

Metro station in China

Jucai Road 聚才路
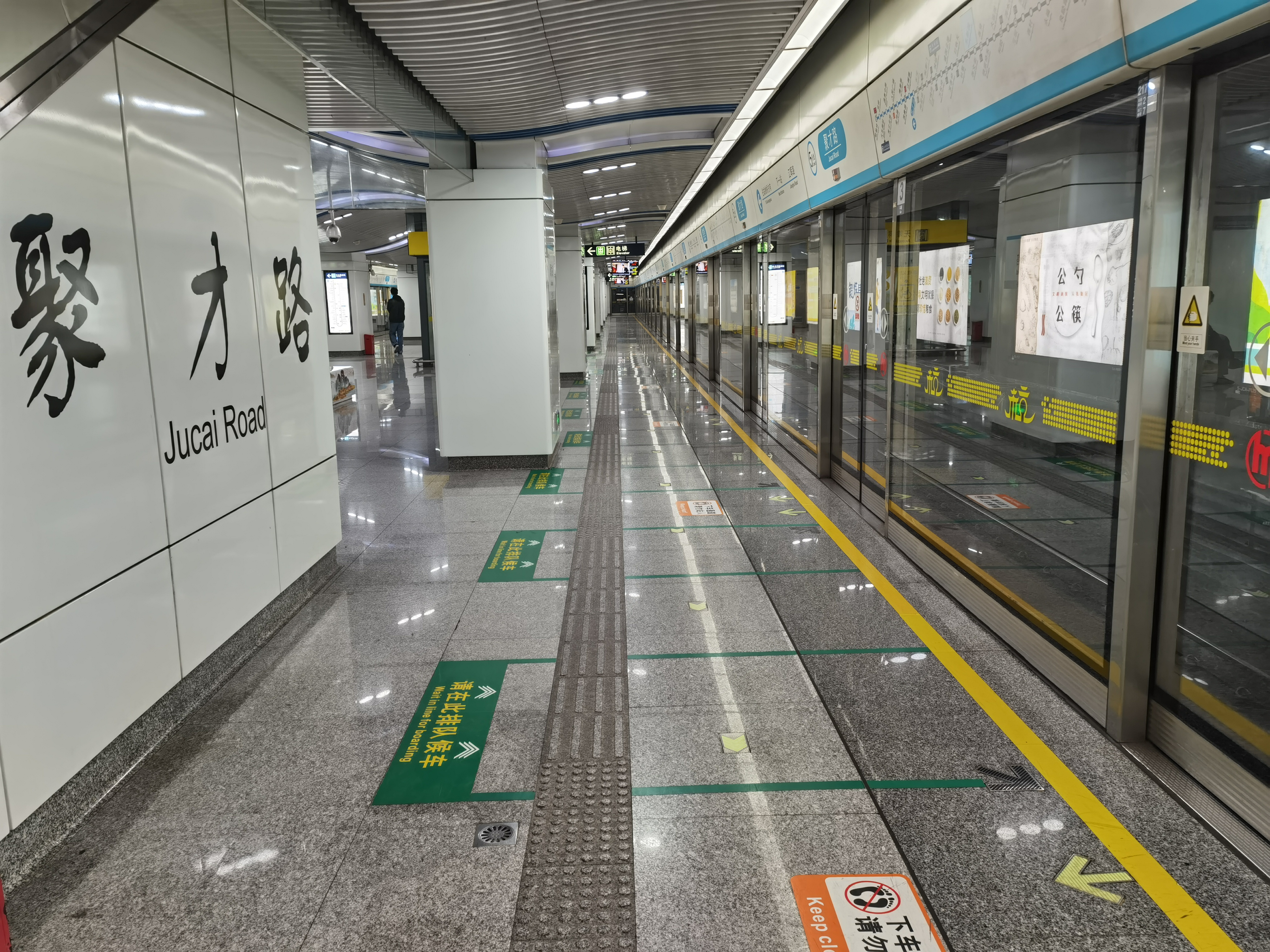

General information
- Location: Poly CITY|GATHER; Binjiang District, Hangzhou, Zhejiang; China
- Coordinates: 30.1849°N 120.1939°E
- Operator: Hangzhou MTR Line 5 Corporation Limited
- Line: Line 5
- Platforms: 2 (1 island platform)

Other information
- Station code: JCL

History
- Opened: April 23, 2020

Services
| Preceding station | Hangzhou Metro | Following station |
|---|---|---|
| Changhe towards East Nanhu | Line 5 | Jianghui Road towards Guniangqiao |
Location

Jucai Road (Chinese: 聚才路) is a metro station on Line 5 of the Hangzhou Metro in China. It is located in the Binjiang District of Hangzhou.

== Station layout ==
The station has an island platform.

== Entrances/exits ==
There are 4 exits. Except exit A, all exits are at the same floor of concourse.

- A: Jucai Road
- (Non label) (Note: Called B in the planning stage): CITY|GATHER (Only for residents)
- C: TIME EDITION
- D: TIME EDITION
