= Zijingang Campus, Zhejiang University station =

Metro station in China

Zijingang Campus, Zhejiang University 浙大紫金港
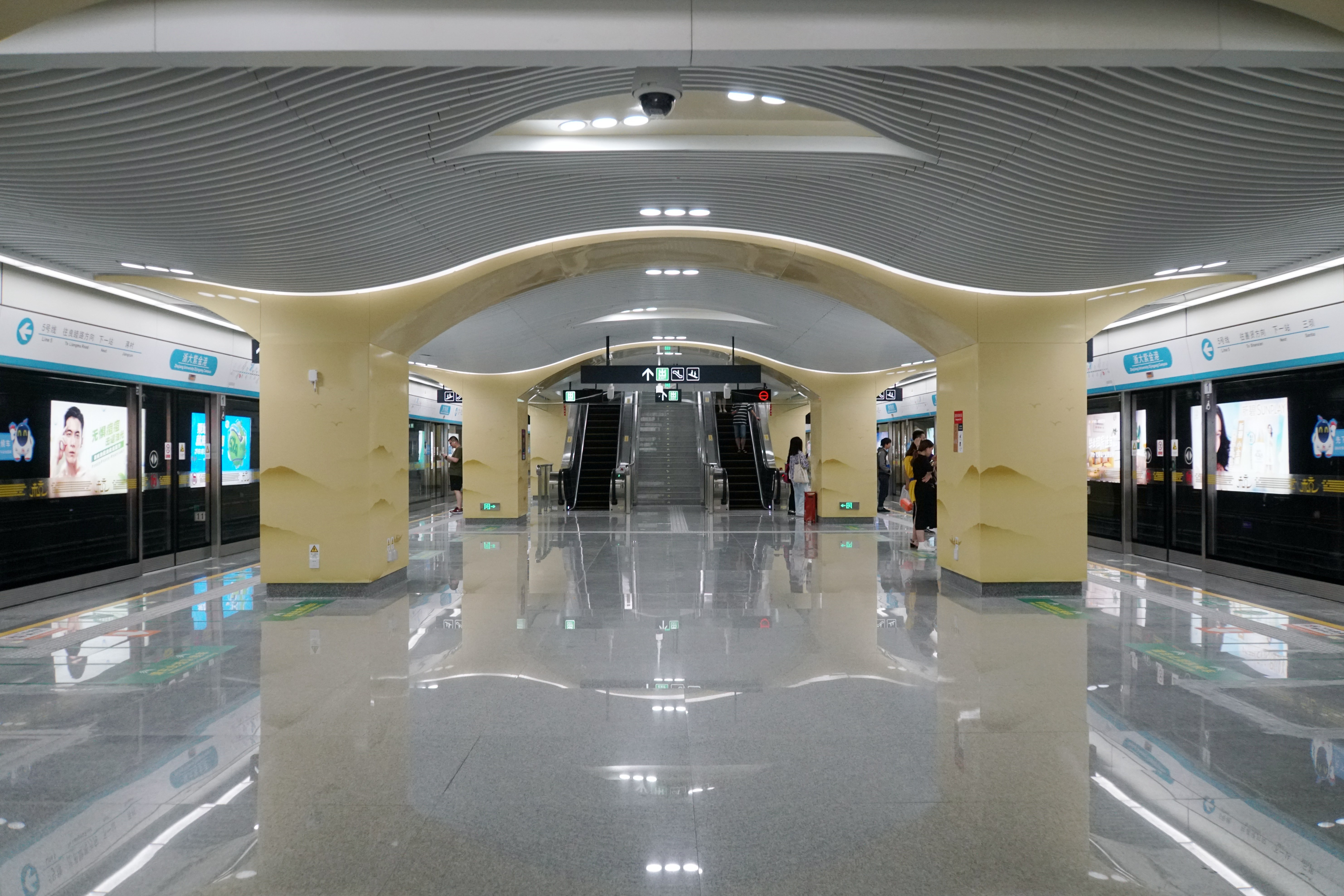

General information
- Location: Yuhangtang Road × Chongxin Road; Xihu District, Hangzhou, Zhejiang; China
- Coordinates: 30°18′N 120°04′E
- System: Hangzhou metro station
- Operator: Hangzhou MTR Line 5 Corporation
- Line: Line 5
- Platforms: 2 (1 island platform)

Construction
- Structure type: Underground
- Accessible: Yes

History
- Opened: June 24, 2019
- Former names: Zhejiang University Zijingang Campus Station (before April 2020)

Services
Preceding station	Hangzhou Metro	Following station
Jiangcun towards East Nanhu	Line 5	Sanba towards Guniangqiao
Location

Zijingang Campus, Zhejiang University (Chinese: 浙大紫金港) is a metro station on Line 5 of the Hangzhou Metro in China. It is located in the Xihu District of Hangzhou and it serves the Zijingang Campus of Zhejiang University.

== Station layout ==
Zijingang Campus, Zhejiang University has two levels: a concourse, and an island platform with two tracks for line 5.

== Entrances/exits ==
- A: north side of Zijingang Road, Zijingang Campus, Zhejiang University
- B1 & B2: Xixi Intime City
- C2: Sincere Garden Zhichengyuan community
