= East Gongchen Bridge station =

Metro station in China

East Gongchen Bridge 拱宸桥东
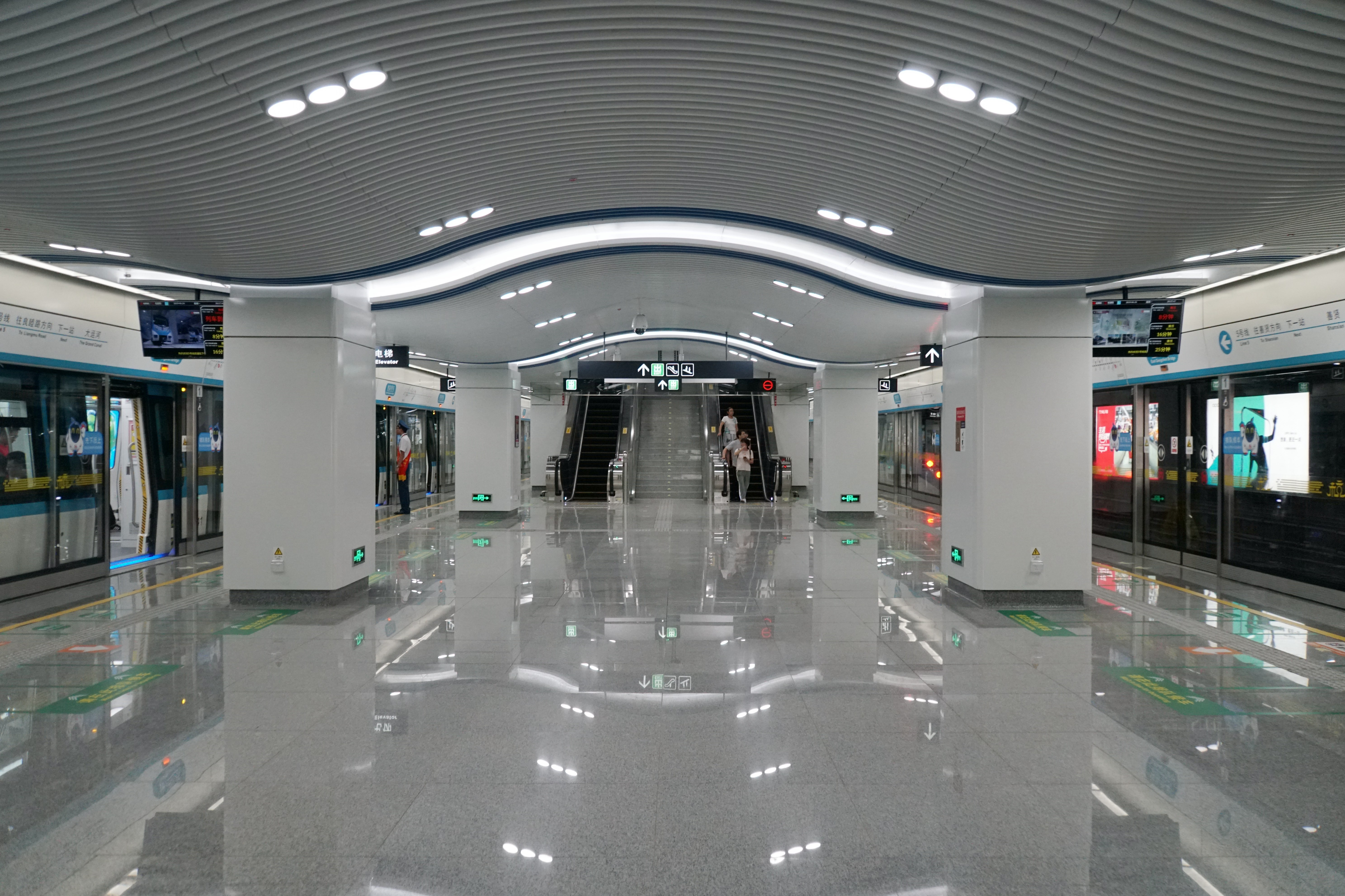

General information
- Location: Quzhou Street(E) × Shangtang Road/Chenlin Road; Gongshu District, Hangzhou, Zhejiang; China
- Coordinates: 30.3192°N 120.1436°E
- System: Hangzhou metro station
- Operator: Hangzhou MTR Line 5 Corporation
- Line: Line 5
- Platforms: 2 (1 island platform)

Construction
- Structure type: Underground
- Accessible: Yes

History
- Opened: June 24, 2019

Services
Preceding station	Hangzhou Metro	Following station
The Grand Canal towards East Nanhu	Line 5	Shanxian towards Guniangqiao
Location

East Gongchen Bridge (simplified Chinese: 拱宸桥东; traditional Chinese: 拱宸橋東) is a metro station on Line 5 of the Hangzhou Metro in China. It is located in the Gongshu District of Hangzhou.

== Station layout ==
East Gongchen Bridge has two levels: a concourse, and an island platform with two tracks for line 5.

== Entrances/exits ==
- A: Zhoushan Road (E), Taizhou Road (E)
- B: north side of Quzhou Street, Zhoushan Road (E)
- C: Shaoxing Road, Hangzhou Shuren Primary School
- D: south side of Quzhou Street

== Surrounding area ==
- Gongchen Bridge
