= The Grand Canal station =

Metro station in China

The Grand Canal 大运河
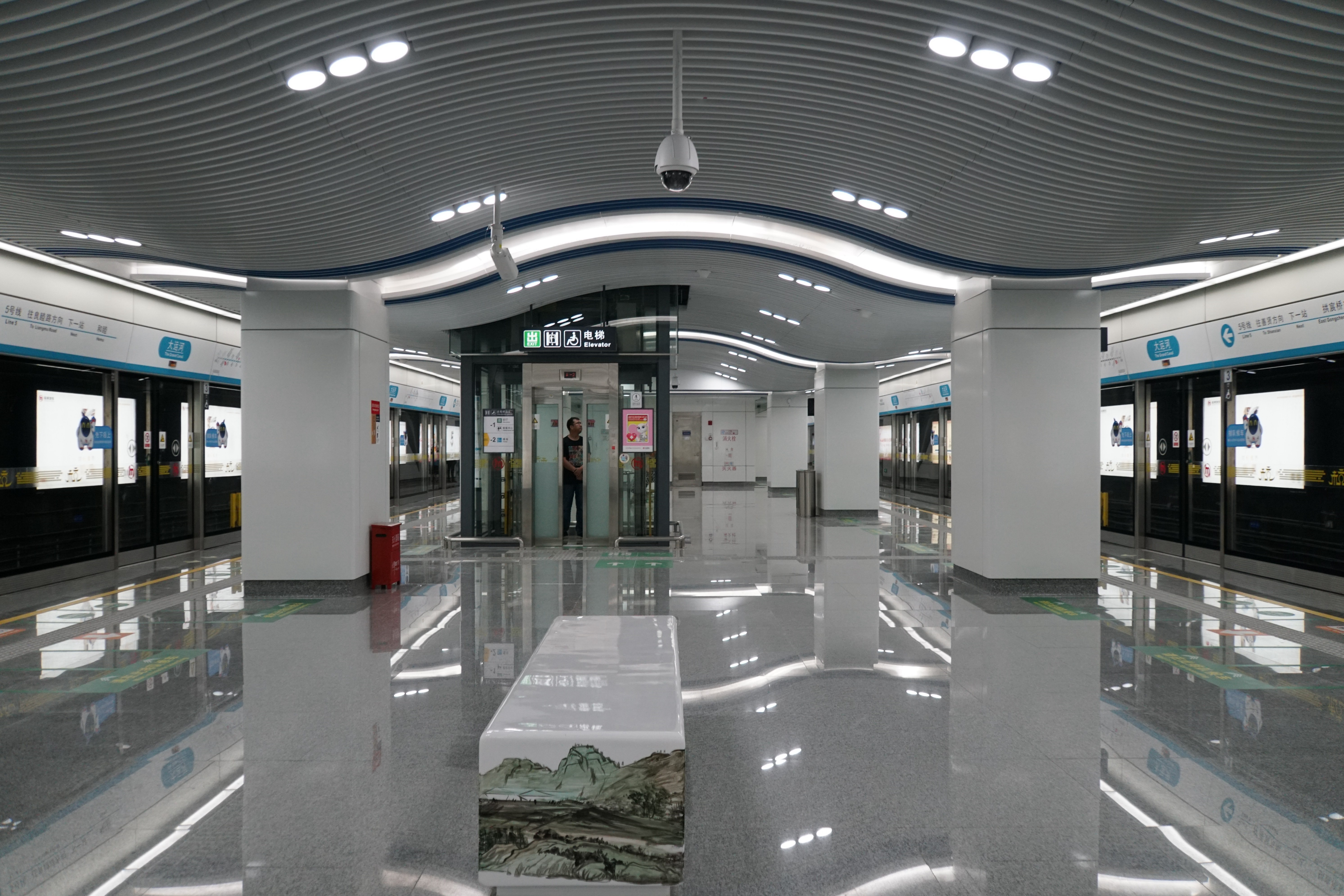

General information
- Location: Qiaonong Street × Tongyi Road; Gongshu District, Hangzhou, Zhejiang; China
- Coordinates: 30.321556°N 120.126679°E
- System: Hangzhou metro station
- Operator: Hangzhou MTR Line 5 Corporation
- Line: Line 5
- Platforms: 2 (1 island platform)

Construction
- Structure type: Underground
- Accessible: Yes

History
- Opened: June 24, 2019

Services
Preceding station	Hangzhou Metro	Following station
Hemu towards East Nanhu	Line 5	East Gongchen Bridge towards Guniangqiao
Location

The Grand Canal (simplified Chinese: 大运河; traditional Chinese: 大運河) is a metro station on Line 5 of the Hangzhou Metro in China. It is located in the Gongshu District of Hangzhou.

== Station layout ==
The Grand Canal has two levels: a concourse, and an island platform with two tracks for line 5.

== Entrances/exits ==
- A: Jinxiu Lanting Community
- B: north side of Qiaonong Street, Pingshui Street (E)
- C: Jiru Jiayuan Community
- D: Palazzo Pitti
