= Pingshui Street station =

Metro station in China

Pingshui Street 萍水街
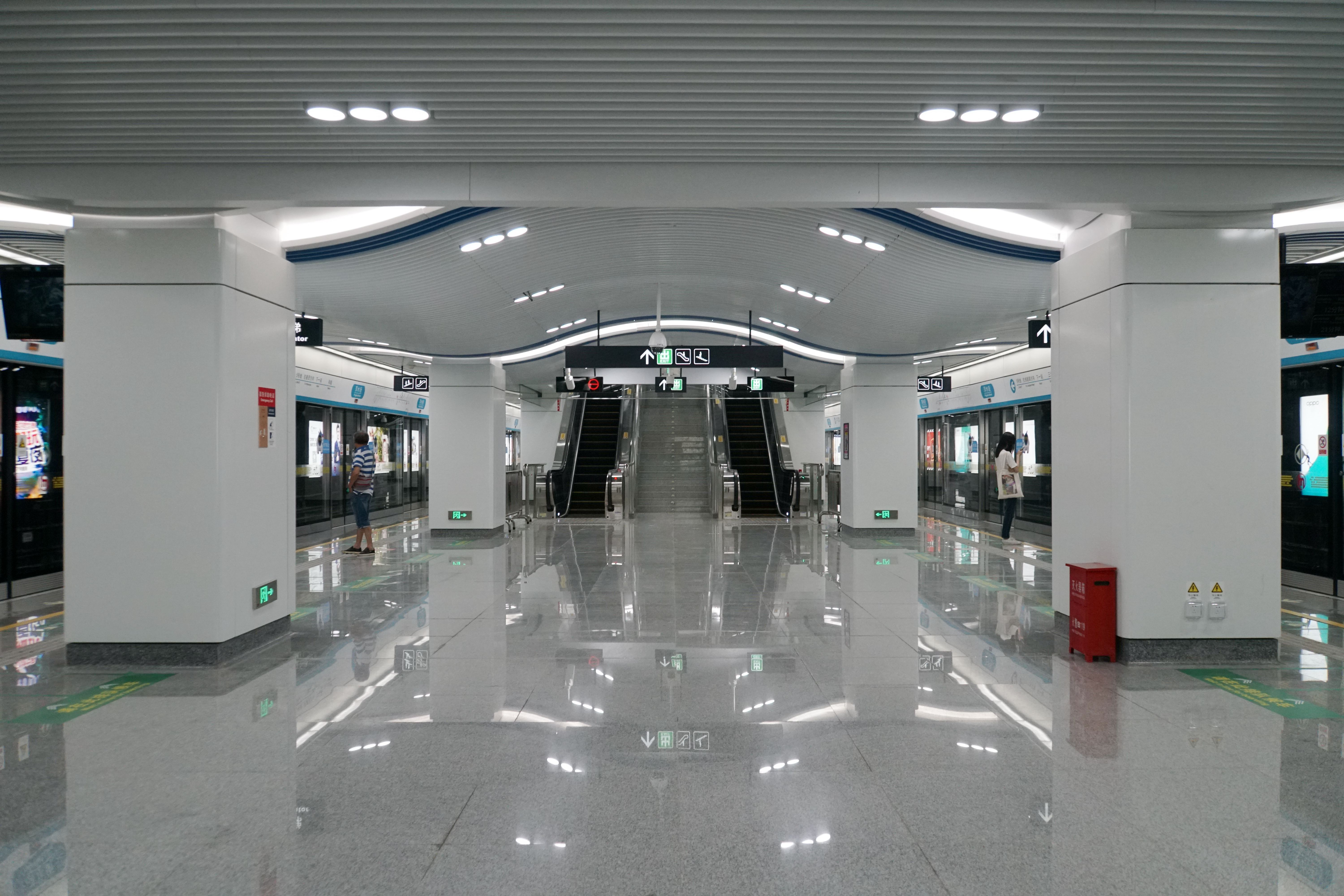
- Platforms

General information
- Location: Pingshui Street × Tangping Road; Gongshu District, Hangzhou, Zhejiang; China
- Coordinates: 30°18′18″N 120°06′27″E
- System: Hangzhou metro station
- Operator: Hangzhou MTR Line 5 Corporation
- Line: Line 5
- Platforms: 2 (1 island platform)

Construction
- Structure type: Underground
- Accessible: Yes

History
- Opened: June 24, 2019

Services
Preceding station	Hangzhou Metro	Following station
Sanba towards East Nanhu	Line 5	Hemu towards Guniangqiao
Location

Pingshui Street (Chinese: 萍水街) is a metro station on Line 5 of the Hangzhou Metro in China. It is located in the Gongshu District of Hangzhou.

== Station layout ==
Pingshui Street has two levels: a concourse, and an island platform with two tracks for line 5.

== Entrances/exits ==
- A: Wonderland
- B: Wonderland
- C: Taihoo Center
- D: south side of Pingshui Street
