= Shanxian station =

Metro station in China

Shanxian 善贤
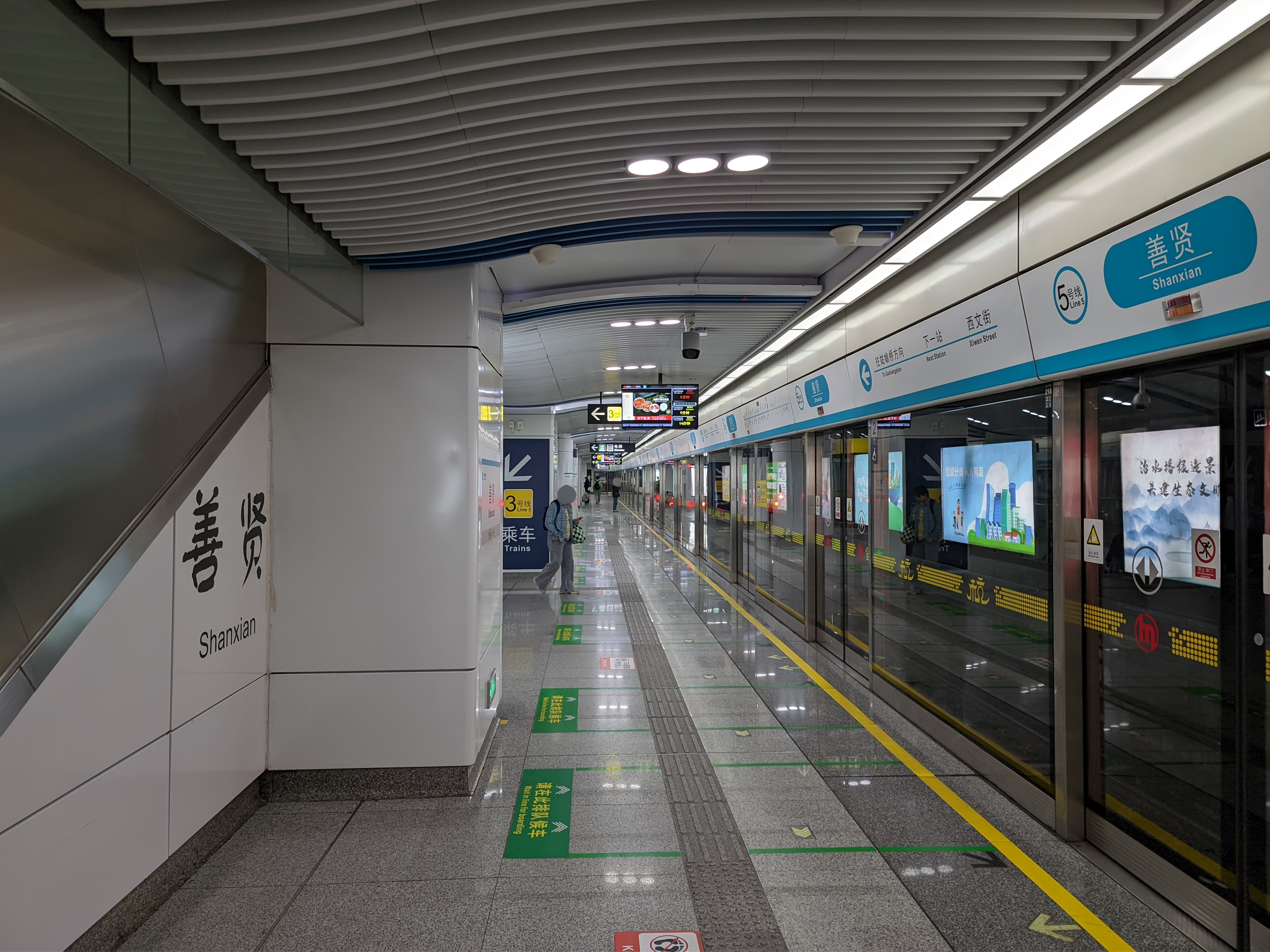
- Platforms of Line 5

General information
- Location: Shenban Road; Gongshu District, Hangzhou, Zhejiang; China
- Coordinates: 30.31867°N 120.15477°E
- System: Hangzhou metro station
- Operator: Hangzhou Metro Corporation; Hangzhou MTR Line 5 Corporation
- Lines: Line 3 Line 5
- Platforms: 4 (2 island platforms)

Construction
- Structure type: Underground
- Accessible: Yes

History
- Opened: 24 June 2019 (Line 5); 21 February 2022 (Line 3)

Services
Preceding station	Hangzhou Metro	Following station
Daguan towards Wushanqiancun or Shima	Line 3	Xintiandi Street towards Xingqiao
East Gongchen Bridge towards East Nanhu	Line 5	Xiwen Street towards Guniangqiao
Location

Shanxian (simplified Chinese: 善贤; traditional Chinese: 善賢) is a metro station on Line 3 and Line 5 of the Hangzhou Metro in China. It is located in the Gongshu District of Hangzhou.

== Station layout ==
Shanxian has three levels: a concourse, and separate levels for lines 3 and 5. Basement 2 is for line 5, and basement 3 is for line 3. Each of these consists of an island platform with two tracks.

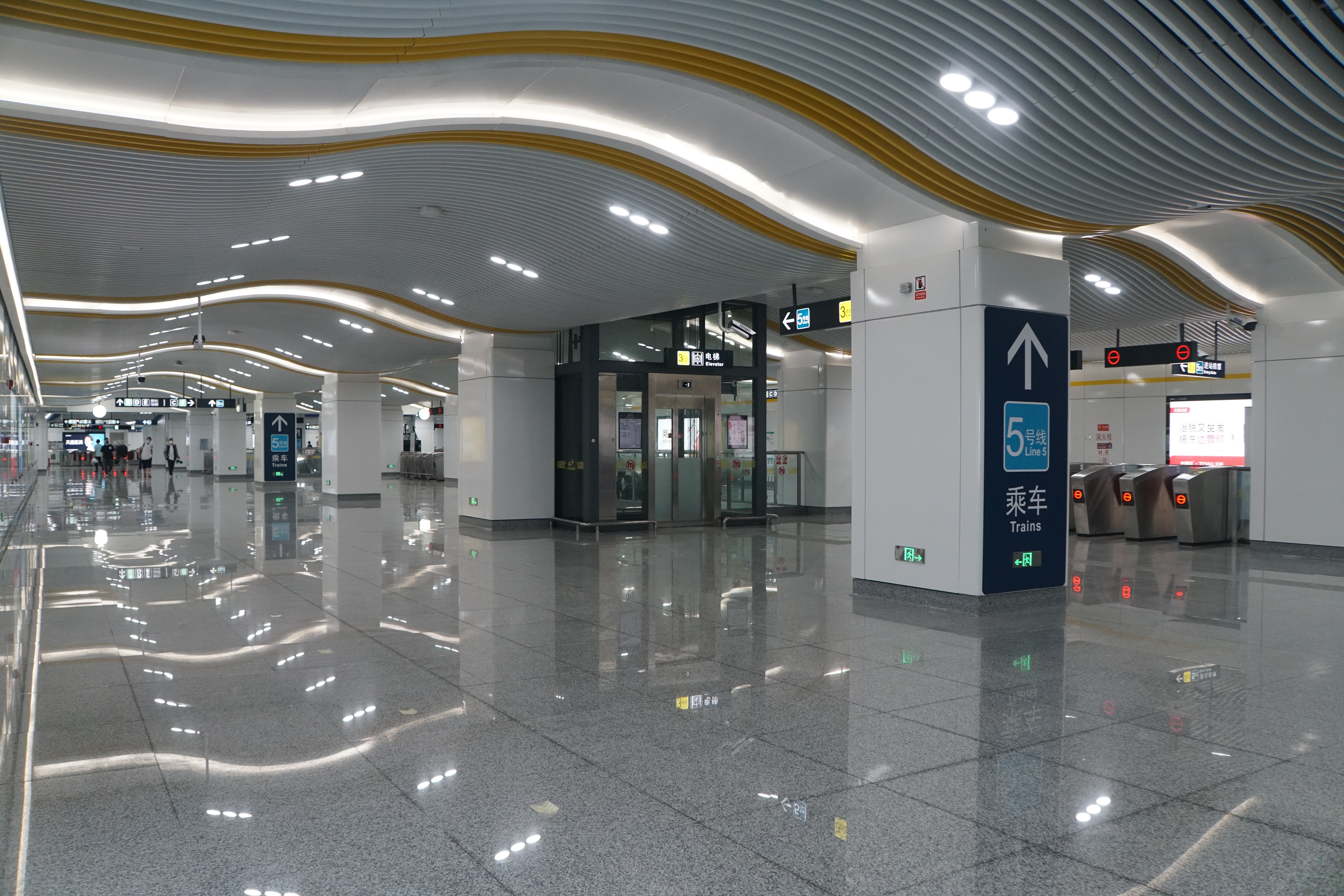
Concourse of Line 3

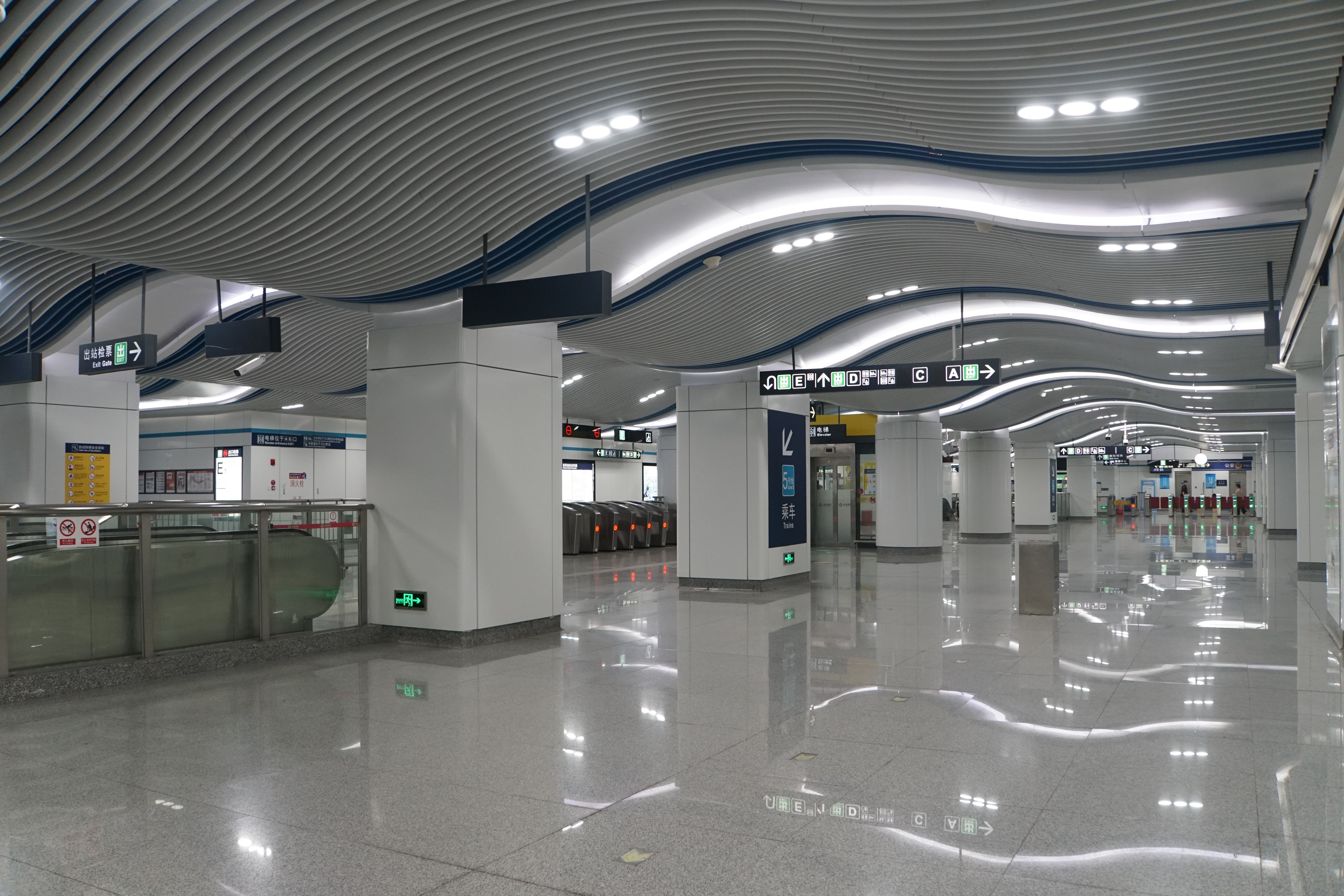
Concourse of Line 5

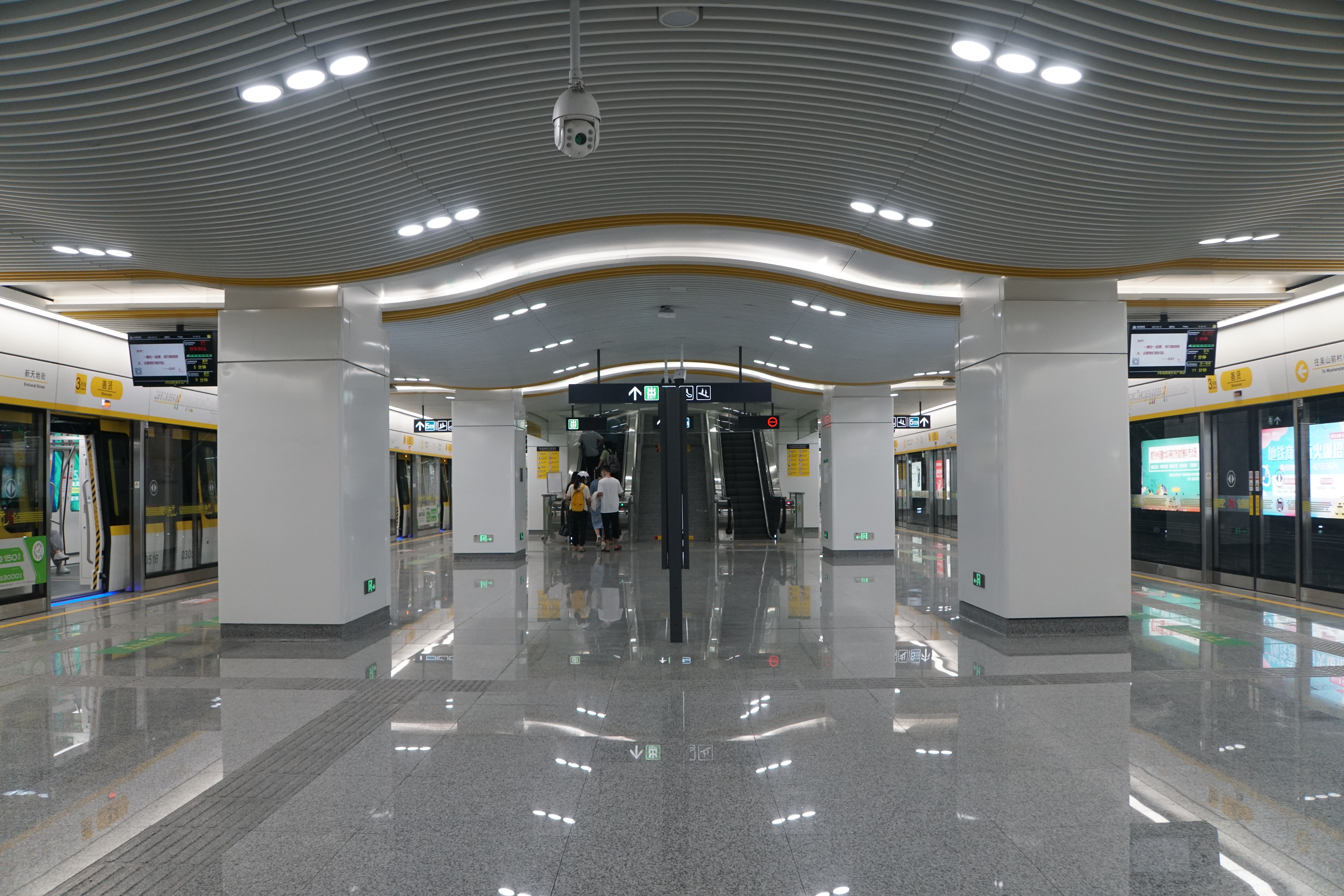
Platforms of Line 3

== Entrances/exits ==
- A: Shanxian Renjia Community
- B1: east side of Shenban Road, Xiwen Street
- B2: west side of Shenban Road, Huzhou Street
- C: west side of Shenban Road, Zhoushan Road (E)
- D1: west side of Shenban Road
- E1: east side of Shenban Road
