= Houchaomen station =

Metro station in China

Houchaomen 候潮门
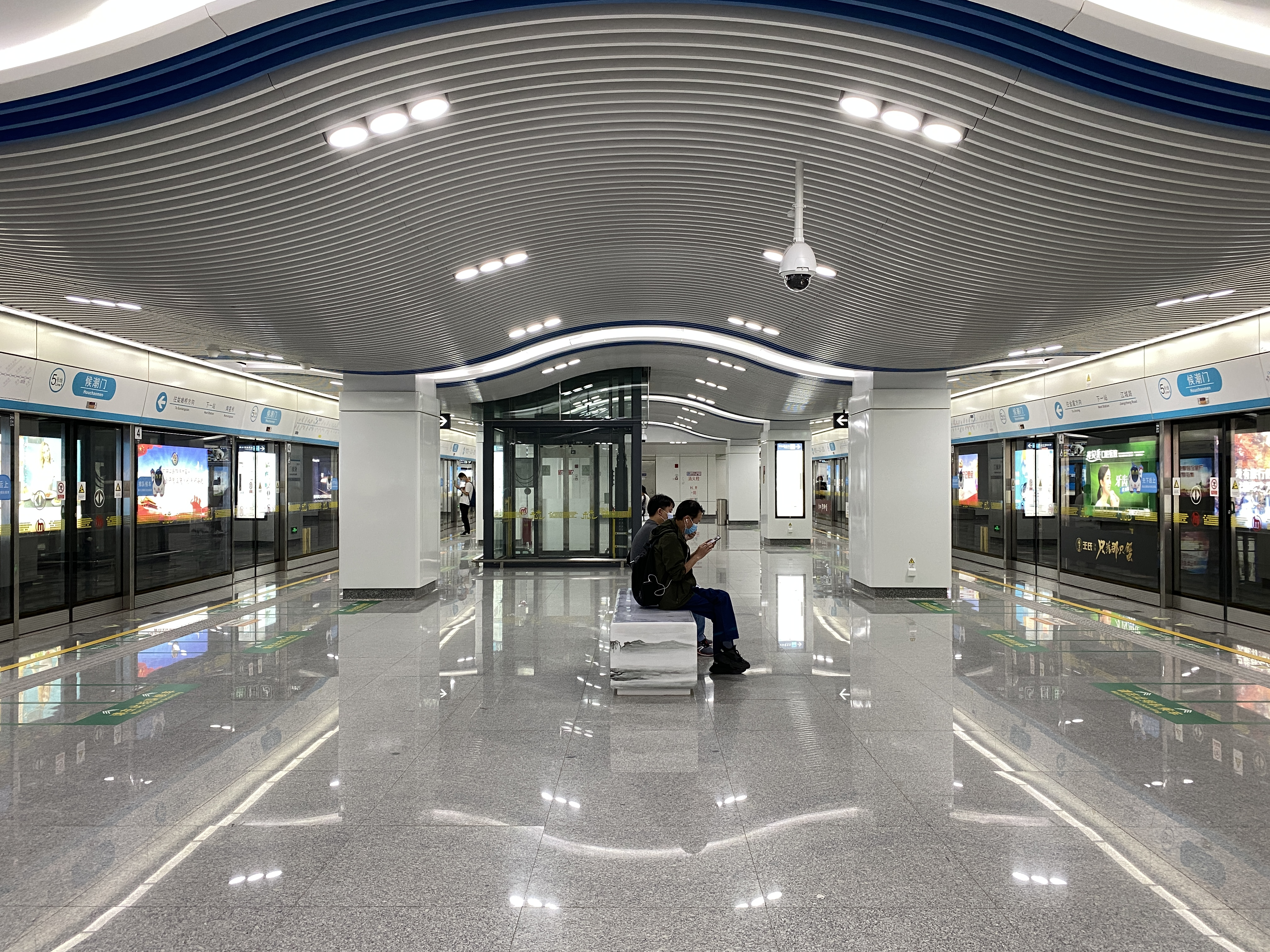

General information
- Location: Jiangcheng Road × Houchao Road & Liubuqiaozhi Street; Shangcheng District, Hangzhou, Zhejiang; China
- Coordinates: 30.2289°N 120.1684°E
- System: Hangzhou metro station
- Operator: Hangzhou MTR Line 5 Corporation
- Line: Line 5
- Platforms: 2 (1 island platform)

Construction
- Structure type: Underground
- Accessible: Yes

History
- Opened: April 23, 2020

Services
Preceding station	Hangzhou Metro	Following station
Jiangcheng Road towards East Nanhu	Line 5	Nanxingqiao towards Guniangqiao
Location

Houchaomen (simplified Chinese: 候潮门; traditional Chinese: 候潮門) is a metro station on Line 5 of the Hangzhou Metro in China. It is located in the Shangcheng District of Hangzhou.

== Station layout ==
The station has an island platform.

== Entrances/exits ==
- A: east side of Jiangcheng Road, Houchao Road
- B: west side of Jiangcheng Road, Liubuqiaozhi Street
- C: west side of Jiangcheng Road, Liubuqiaozhi Street
- D: east side of Jiangcheng Road, Houchao Road
