= Shuangqiao station (Hangzhou Metro) =

Metro station in Hangzhou, China

Shuangqiao 双桥
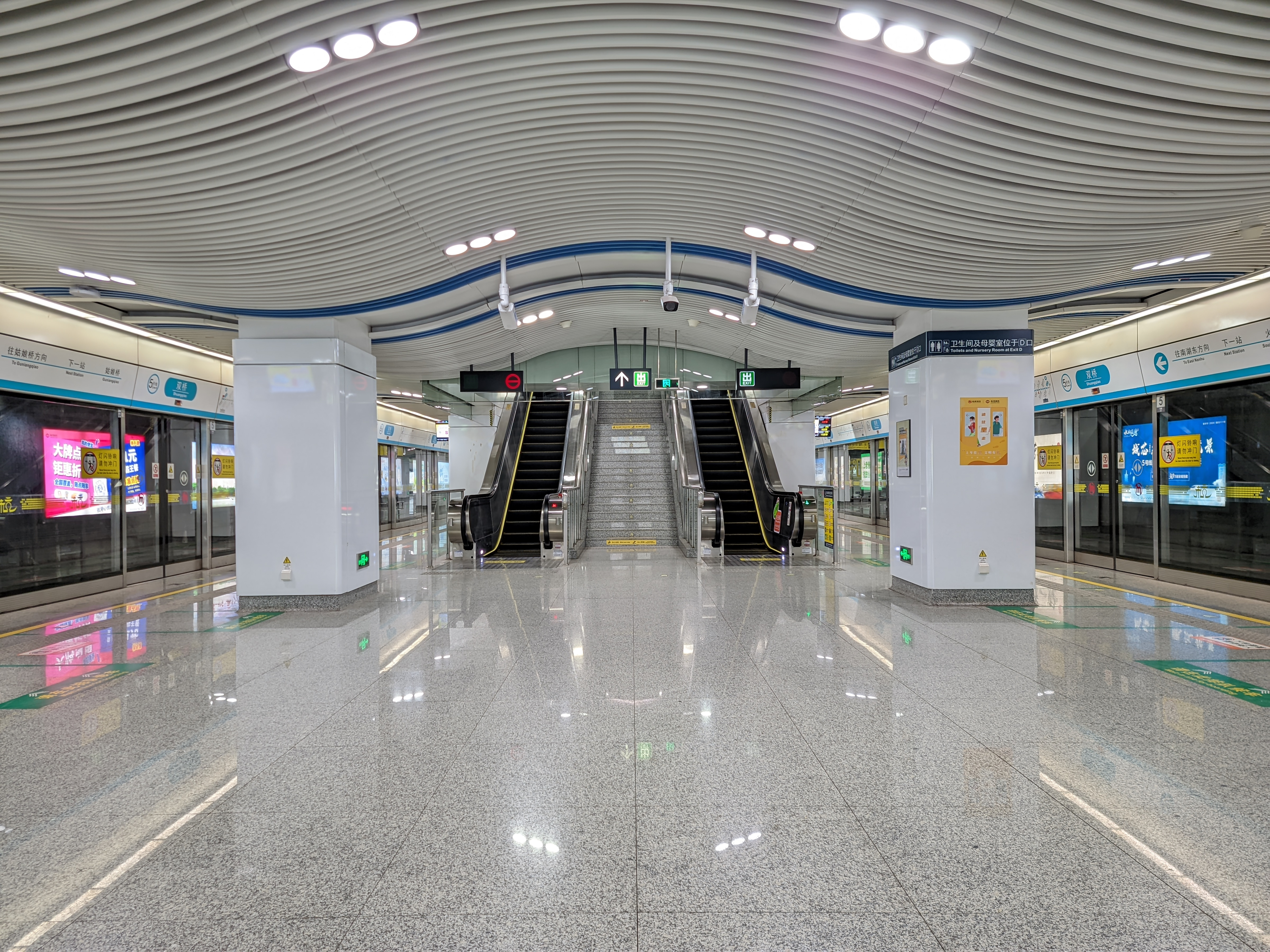
- Platforms

Chinese name
- Simplified Chinese: 双桥站
- Traditional Chinese: 雙橋站
Transcriptions
Standard Mandarin
- Hanyu Pinyin: Shuāngqiáo Zhàn

General information
- Location: Zhanwen Street × Xincheng Road; Xiaoshan District, Hangzhou, Zhejiang; China
- Coordinates: 30°10′32″N 120°18′15″E
- System: Hangzhou Metro
- Operator: Hangzhou MTR Line 5 Corporation
- Line: Line 5
- Platforms: 2 (1 island platform)
- Tracks: 2

Construction
- Structure type: Underground
- Accessible: Yes

History
- Opened: 23 April 2020

Services
Preceding station	Hangzhou Metro	Following station
South Railway Station towards East Nanhu	Line 5	Guniangqiao Terminus
Location

Shuangqiao (Chinese: 双桥) is a metro station on Line 5 of the Hangzhou Metro in China. It is located in the Xiaoshan District of Hangzhou.

== Station layout ==
Shuangqiao has two levels: a concourse, and an island platform with two tracks for line 5.

== Entrances/exits ==
- A; Xiaoshan No.3 High School
- C: south side of Zhanwen Street
- D: east side of Xincheng Road
