= Jinxing station (Hangzhou Metro) =

Metro station in China

Jinxing 金星
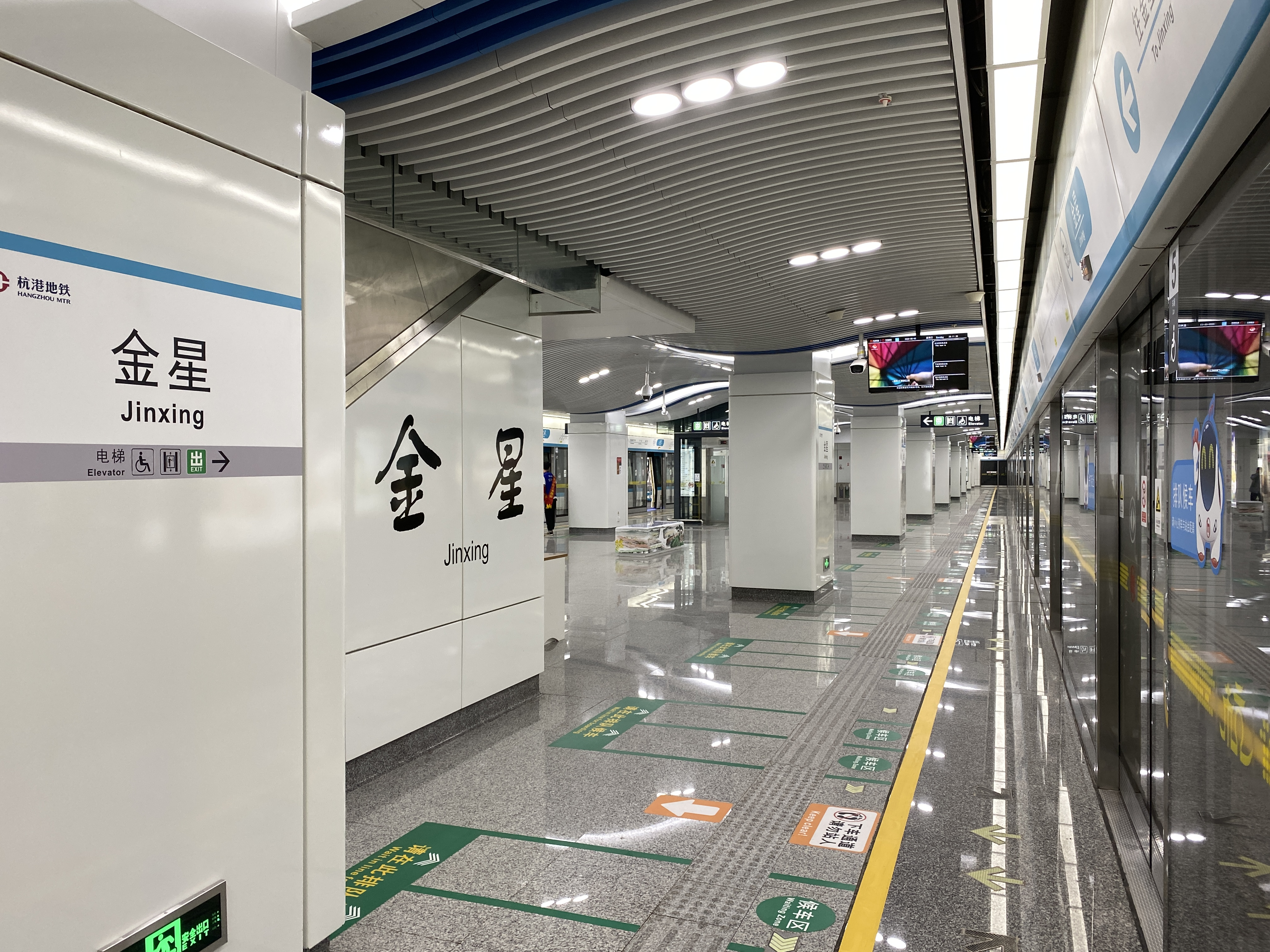
- Platform

General information
- Location: Wen'er Road (W) × Zhiyi Road; Yuhang District, Hangzhou, Zhejiang; China
- Coordinates: 30°16′04″N 119°57′41″E
- System: Hangzhou metro station
- Operator: Hangzhou MTR Line 5 Corporation
- Line: Line 5
- Platforms: 2 (1 island platform)

Construction
- Structure type: Underground
- Accessible: Yes

History
- Opened: April 23, 2020

Services
Preceding station	Hangzhou Metro	Following station
East Nanhu Terminus	Line 5	Lvting Road towards Guniangqiao
Location

Jinxing (Chinese: 金星) is a metro station on Line 5 of the Hangzhou Metro in China. It is located in the Yuhang District of Hangzhou. It served as the western terminus of Line 5 before January 1, 2025, when East Nanhu station opened and took over that role.

== Station layout ==
Jinxing has two levels: a concourse, and an island platform with two tracks for line 5.

== Entrances/exits ==
- A: north side of Wen'er Road (W), Shuyun Road
- B: Meijiaqiao Xingyuan community
- C: Yuhang Middle School
- D: Cainiao Smart Park
- E: Cainiao Smart Park
- F: south side of Wen'er Road (W), Shuyun Road
