= Line 5 (Hangzhou Metro) =

Subway line of the Hangzhou Metro in China

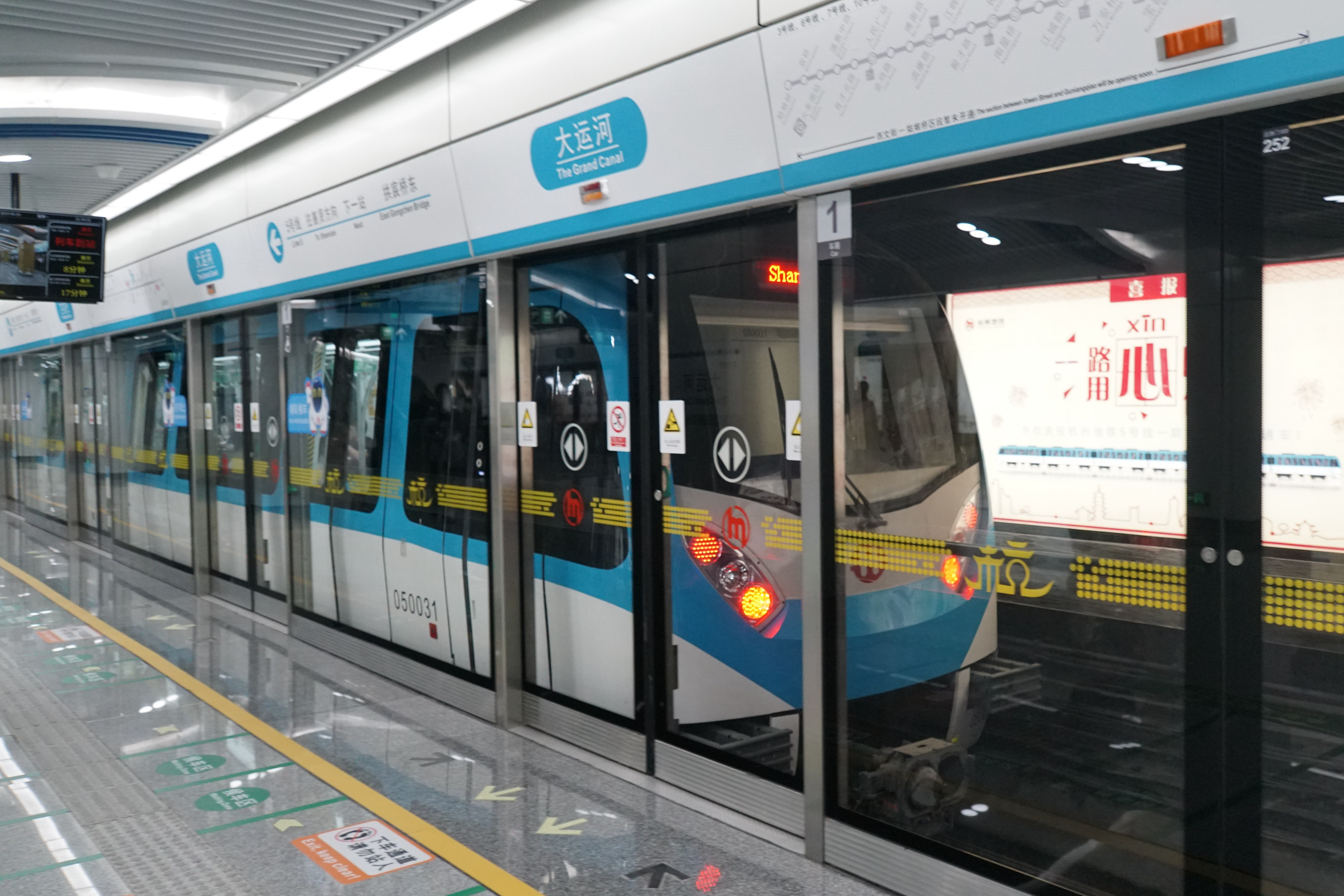
- Train of Line 5 departing The Grand Canal station

Overview
- Status: Operational
- Owner: City of Hangzhou
- Locale: Hangzhou, Zhejiang, China
- Termini: East Nanhu; Guniangqiao
- Stations: 40

Service
- Type: Rapid transit
- System: Hangzhou Metro
- Services: 1
- Operator: Hangzhou MTR Line 5 Corporation Limited
- Depot(s): Wuchang Depot; Guniangqiao Stabling Yard
- Rolling stock: PM126
- Daily ridership: 535,000 (working days in the first half of 2021)

History
- Opened: 24 June 2019; 7 years ago

Technical
- Line length: 56.21 km (34.93 mi)
- Character: Underground
- Track gauge: 1,435 mm (4 ft 8 1/2 in)
- Electrification: Overhead 1,500 V DC
- Operating speed: 80 km/h (50 mph)

Line 5 of the Hangzhou Metro (simplified Chinese: 杭州地铁五号线; traditional Chinese: 杭州地鐵五號線; pinyin: Hángzhōu Dìtiě Wǔhào Xiàn) is a subway line in Hangzhou. The line is colored cyan on system maps. All 40 of its stations are underground.

The line is operated by Hangzhou MTR Line 5 Corporation Limited, a joint venture of MTR Corporation (60% shareholding) and Hangzhou Metro Group under PPP contract. Established on 26 June 2017, it's responsible for investment and construction for electrical and mechanical systems as well as the operations and maintenance of the Hangzhou Metro Line 5 (HZL5) for 25 years after full line opens.

== Opening timeline ==
Segment	Commencement	Length	Station(s)	Name
Liangmu Road — Shanxian	24 June 2019; 7 years ago	17.76 kilometres (11.04 mi)	12	Phase 1 (initial section)
Shanxian — Guniangqiao	23 April 2020; 6 years ago	36.16 kilometres (22.47 mi)	21	Phase 1 (final section)
Jinxing — Liangmu Road	23 April 2020; 6 years ago	36.16 kilometres (22.47 mi)	4	Phase 2
South Railway Station	30 June 2020; 6 years ago	Infill station	1	
Baoshan Bridge	1 April 2022; 4 years ago	Infill station	1	
East Nanhu	1 January 2025; 19 months ago		1	

== Stations ==
Line 5 runs from East Nanhu to Guniangqiao. The eastern terminus, Guniangqiao, is an interchange with Shaoxing Metro Line 1.

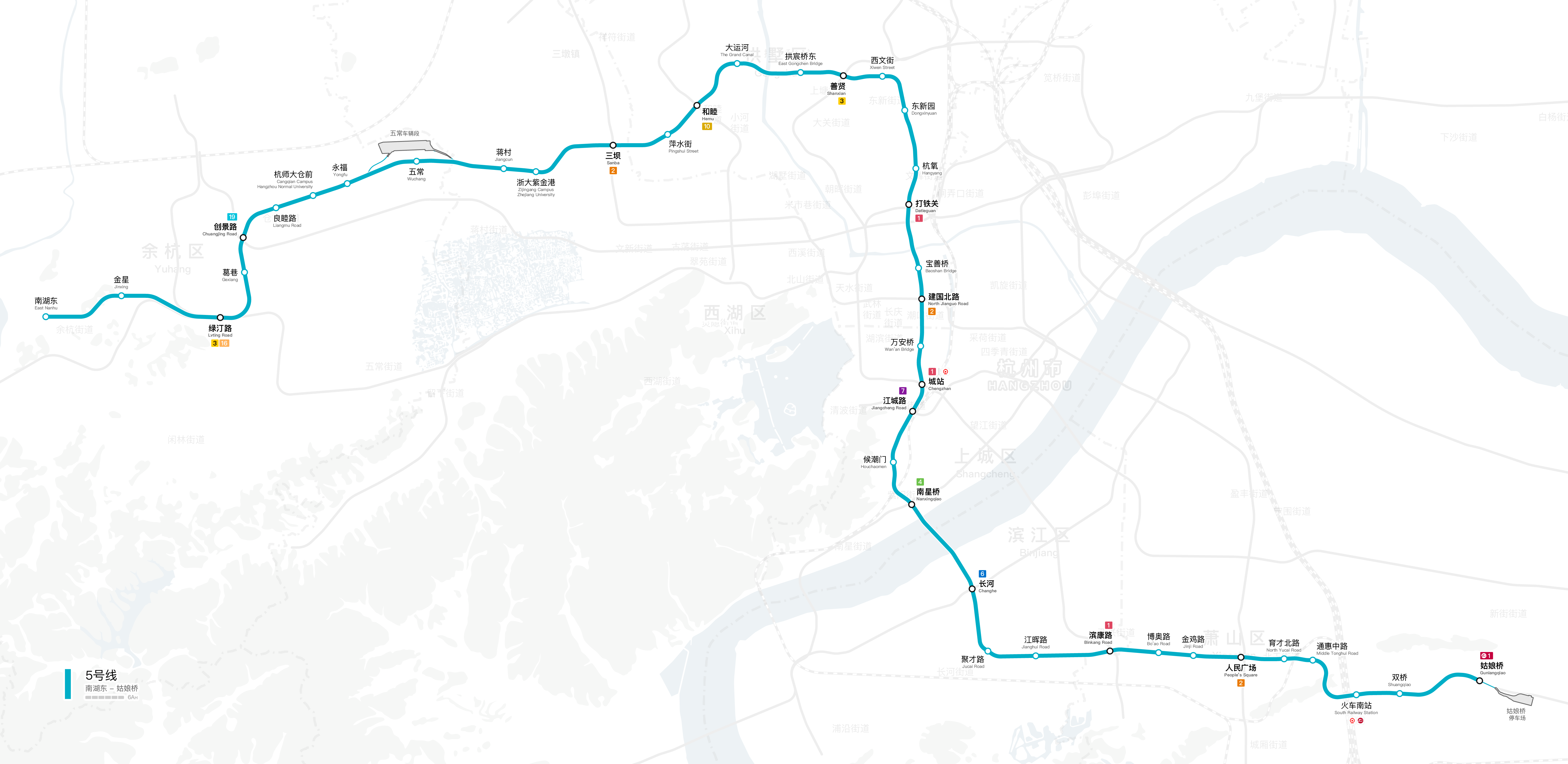

Legend

- Operational
- Under construction

Station name		Connections	Distance km		Location
English	Chinese	Connections	Distance km		Location
East Nanhu	南湖东			0.42	Yuhang
Jinxing	金星		2.03	2.45	Yuhang
Lvting Road	绿汀路	3 16	2.59	5.04	Yuhang
Gexiang	葛巷		1.75	6.79	Yuhang
Chuangjing Road	创景路	19	0.87	7.66	Yuhang
Liangmu Road	良睦路		1.31	8.97	Yuhang
Cangqian Campus Hangzhou Normal University	杭师大仓前	12	1.01	9.98	Yuhang
Yongfu	永福		0.93	10.91	Yuhang
Wuchang	五常		1.91	12.82	Yuhang
Jiangcun	蒋村		2.27	15.09	Xihu
Zijingang Campus Zhejiang University	浙大紫金港		0.79	15.88	Xihu
Sanba	三坝	2	2.28	18.16	Xihu
Pingshui Street	萍水街		1.47	19.63	Gongshu
Hemu	和睦	10	1.08	20.71	Gongshu
The Grand Canal	大运河		1.68	22.39	Gongshu
East Gongchen Bridge	拱宸桥东		1.62	24.01	Gongshu
Shanxian	善贤	3 15	1.16	25.17	Gongshu
Xiwen Street	西文街		1.01	26.18	Gongshu
Dongxinyuan	东新园	8	1.15	27.33	Gongshu
Hangyang	杭氧		1.63	28.96	Gongshu
Datieguan	打铁关	1 15	1.00	29.86	Gongshu
Baoshan Bridge	宝善桥		1.63	31.49	Gongshu
North Jianguo Road	建国北路	2	0.81	32.30	Gongshu
Wan'an Bridge	万安桥		1.13	33.43	Shangcheng
Chengzhan	城站	1; 5 18 HZH	1.08	34.51	Shangcheng
Jiangcheng Road	江城路	7	0.75	35.26	Shangcheng
Houchaomen	候潮门		1.43	36.69	Shangcheng
Nanxingqiao	南星桥	4	1.23	37.92	Shangcheng
Changhe	长河	6	2.72	40.64	Binjiang
Jucai Road	聚才路		1.74	42.38	Binjiang
Jianghui Road	江晖路	18	1.23	43.61	Binjiang
Binkang Road	滨康路	1	1.93	45.54	Binjiang
Bo'ao Road	博奥路		1.26	46.80	Xiaoshan
Jinji Road	金鸡路		0.92	47.72	Xiaoshan
People's Square	人民广场	2	1.23	48.95	Xiaoshan
North Yucai Road	育才北路		1.10	50.05	Xiaoshan
Middle Tonghui Road	通惠中路		0.72	50.77	Xiaoshan
South Railway Station	火车南站	HZN; Shaoxing TNT	1.86	52.63	Xiaoshan
Shuangqiao	双桥		1.14	53.77	Xiaoshan
Guniangqiao	姑娘桥	1 (Shaoxing Metro)	2.26	56.03	Xiaoshan

== Description ==
Phase 1 of the line is 48.6 km (30.2 mi) long with 36 stations and runs between Central Park station in Yuhang District and Xiangzhang Road station in Xiaoshan District in the east, passing through downtown Hangzhou and providing transfers with multiple other lines in the system including Hangshao line (now Keqiao section of Line 1 of the neighboring Shaoxing Metro). Phase 2 of the line further extends 3.2 km and two stations east to Lvting Road. A 5 km (3.1 mi), two station extension west to Laoyuhang station in Yuhang District started construction in 2018.

== Rolling stock ==
The Line 5 uses higher capacity six car Class A_{H} trains which are 20 cm wider than the Class B trains used in other Hangzhou Metro lines, increasing capacity by about 10%.

Stock	Class	Year built	Builder	Number built	Numbers	Formation	Depots	Line assigned	Notes
PM126	A_{H}	2018–2020	CRRC Nanjing Puzhen	366 (61 sets)	05 001 - 05 061 (050011–050616)	Tc+Mp+M+M+Mp+Tc	Wuchang Depot; Guniangqiao Yard	5	
PMAAD	A_{H}	2024–2025	CRRC Nanjing Puzhen	54 (9 sets)	05 062 - 05 070 (050621–050706)	Tc+Mp+M+M+Mp+Tc	Wuchang Depot; Guniangqiao Yard	5	

== Incident ==
On 1 August 2025, some people said that at around 7:00 am on a train departing from East Nanhu station, a screen onboard did not display Line 5 route map and the station information in usual. Instead, it displayed the looped advertisements and Hangzhou MTR logo only on the screen in 12 minutes until it returned to normal at 7:12 am.

== See also ==
- Hangzhou Metro
- Shaoxing Metro
