= East Nanhu station =

Metro station in China

East Nanhu 南湖东
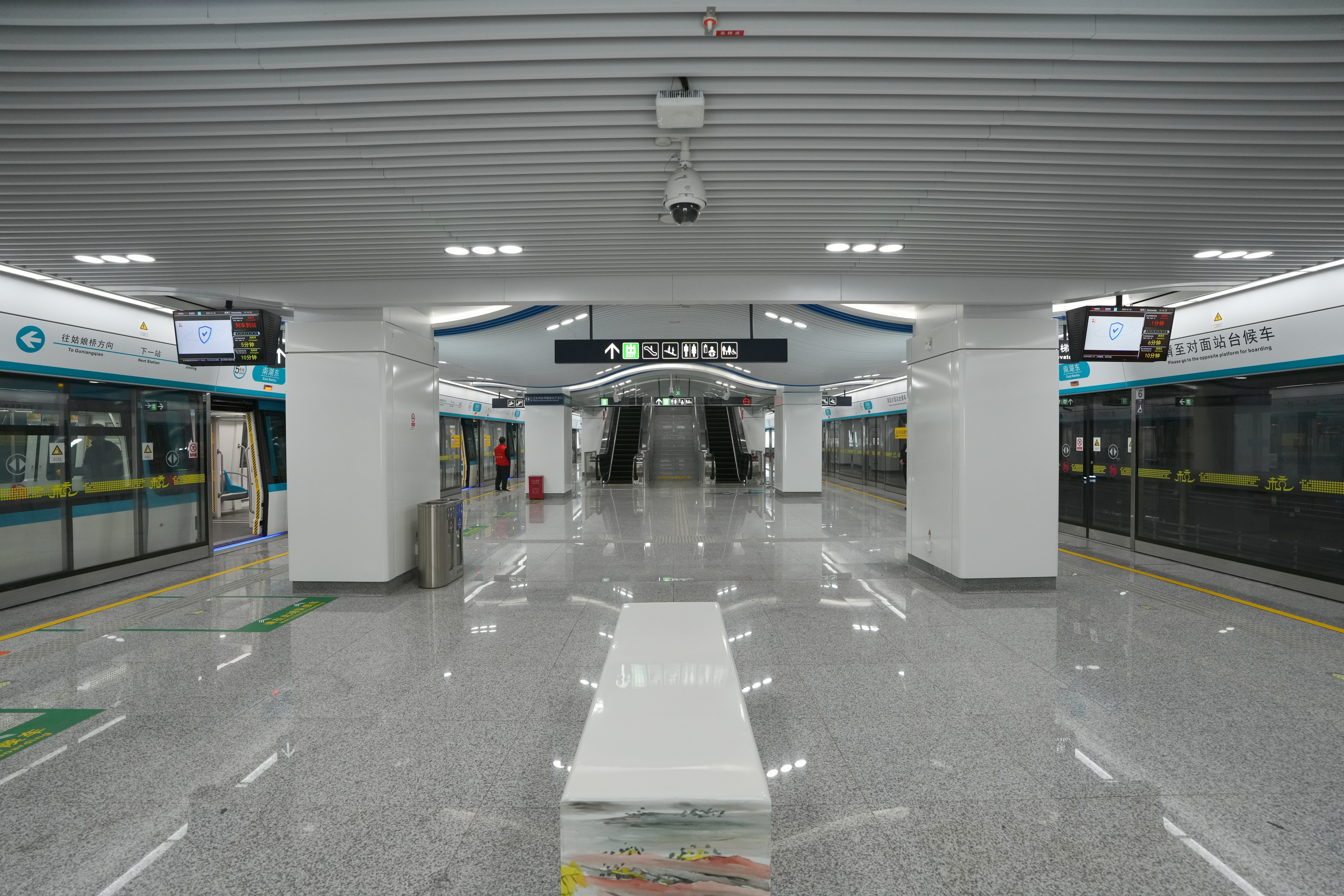
- Platforms

General information
- Location: Fengxin Road × Yuhang Road; Yuhang District, Hangzhou, Zhejiang; China
- Coordinates: 30.262618°N 119.942049°E
- System: Hangzhou metro station
- Operator: Hangzhou MTR Line 5 Corporation
- Line: Line 5
- Platforms: 2 (1 island platform)

History
- Opened: January 1, 2025

Services
Preceding station	Hangzhou Metro	Following station
Terminus	Line 5	Jinxing towards Guniangqiao
Location

East Nanhu (simplified Chinese: 南湖东站; traditional Chinese: 南湖東站; pinyin: Nánhú Dōng zhàn) is a metro station on Line 5 of the Hangzhou Metro in China. It is located in the Yuhang District of Hangzhou. When it opened on January 1, 2025, it replaced Jinxing station as the western terminus of Line 5.

== Station layout ==
East Nanhu has two levels: a concourse, and an island platform with two tracks for line 5.

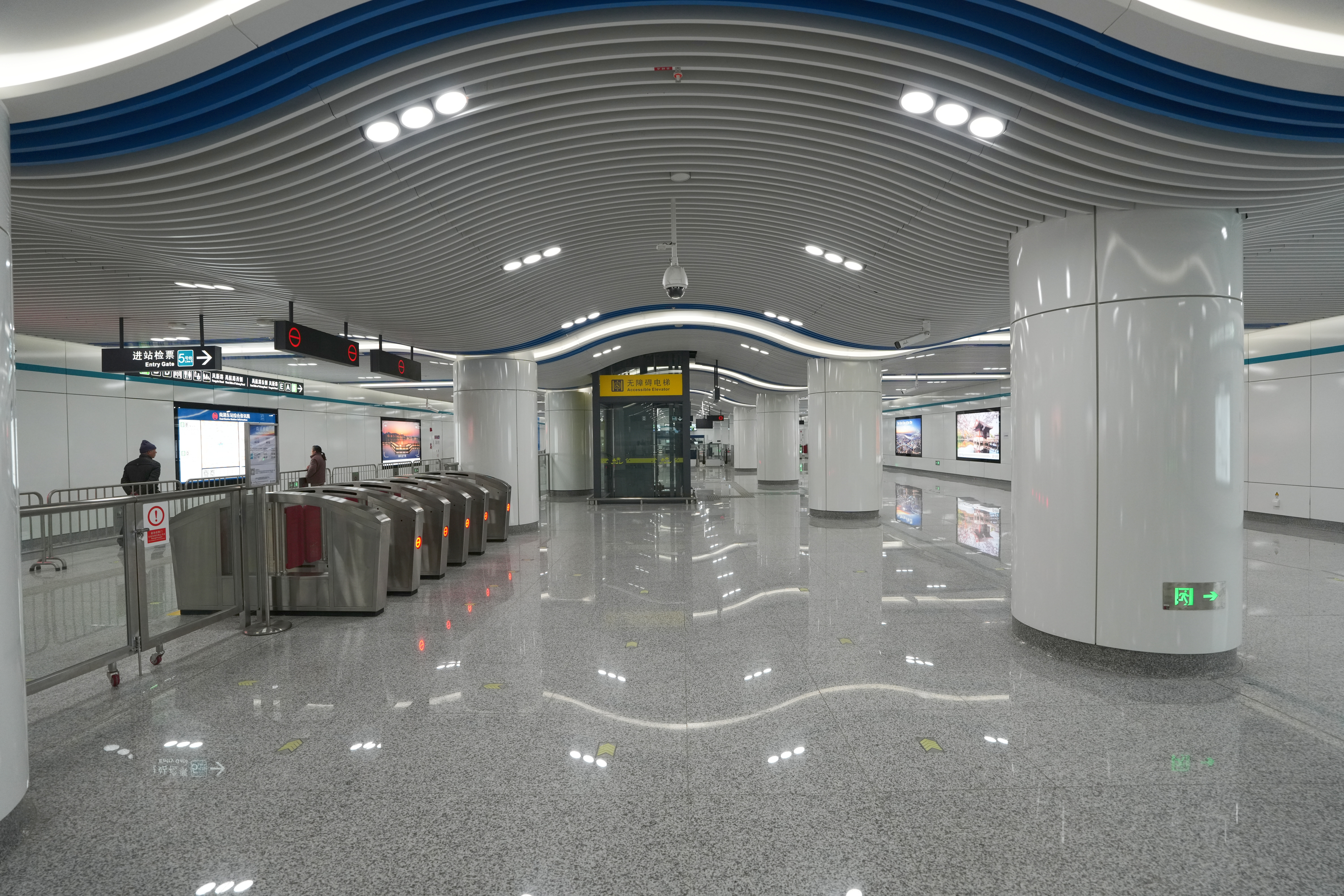
Concourse

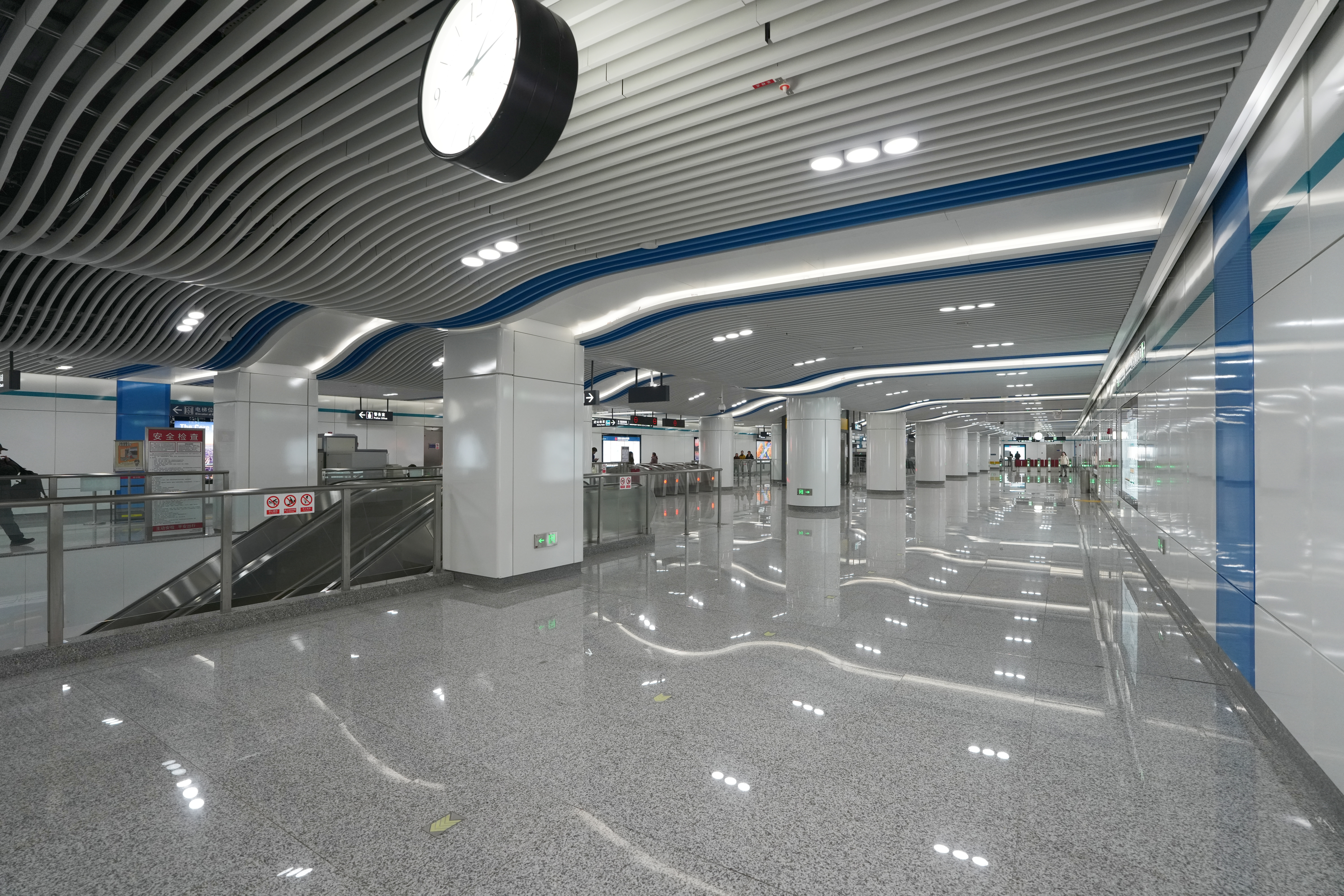
Concourse

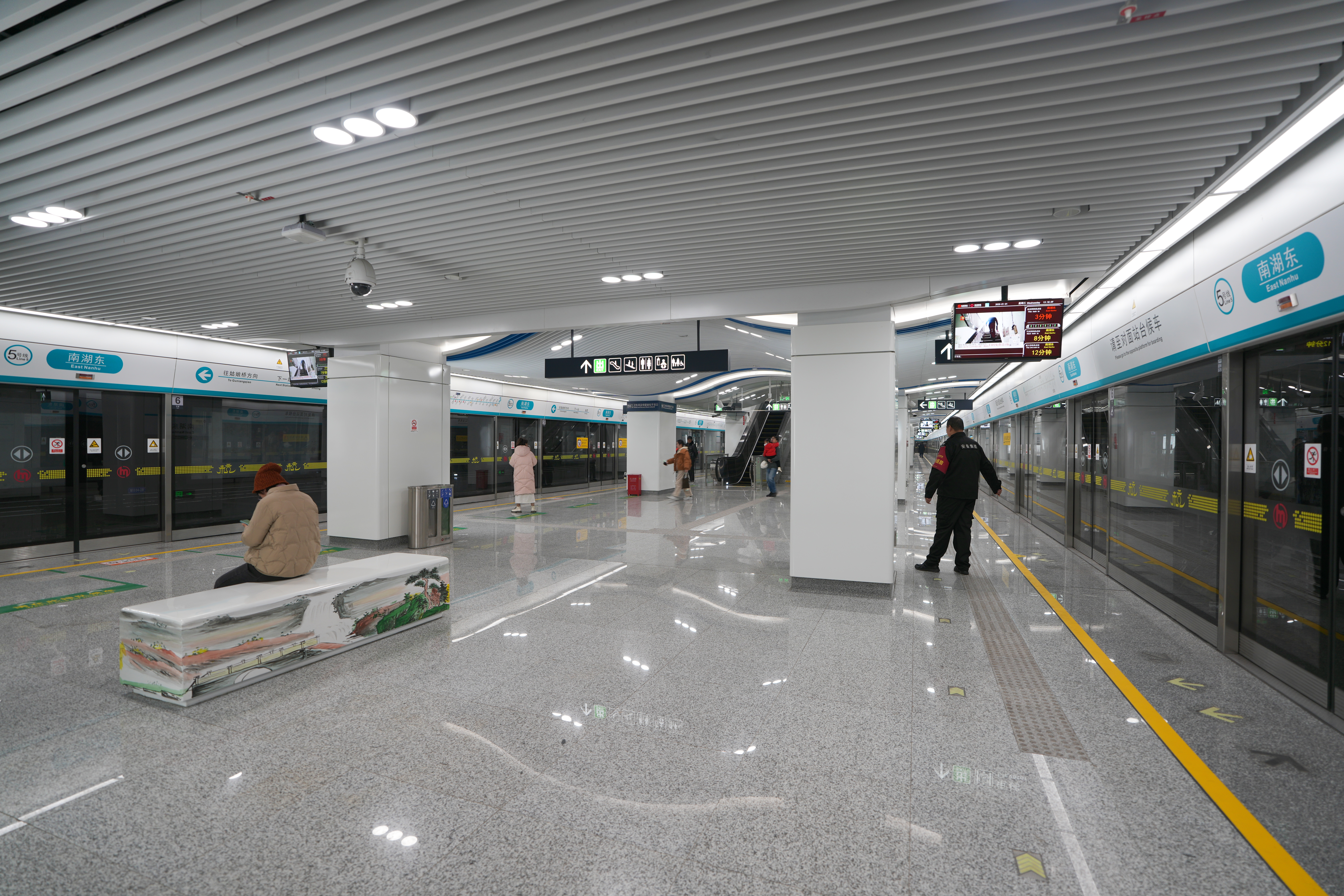
Platform

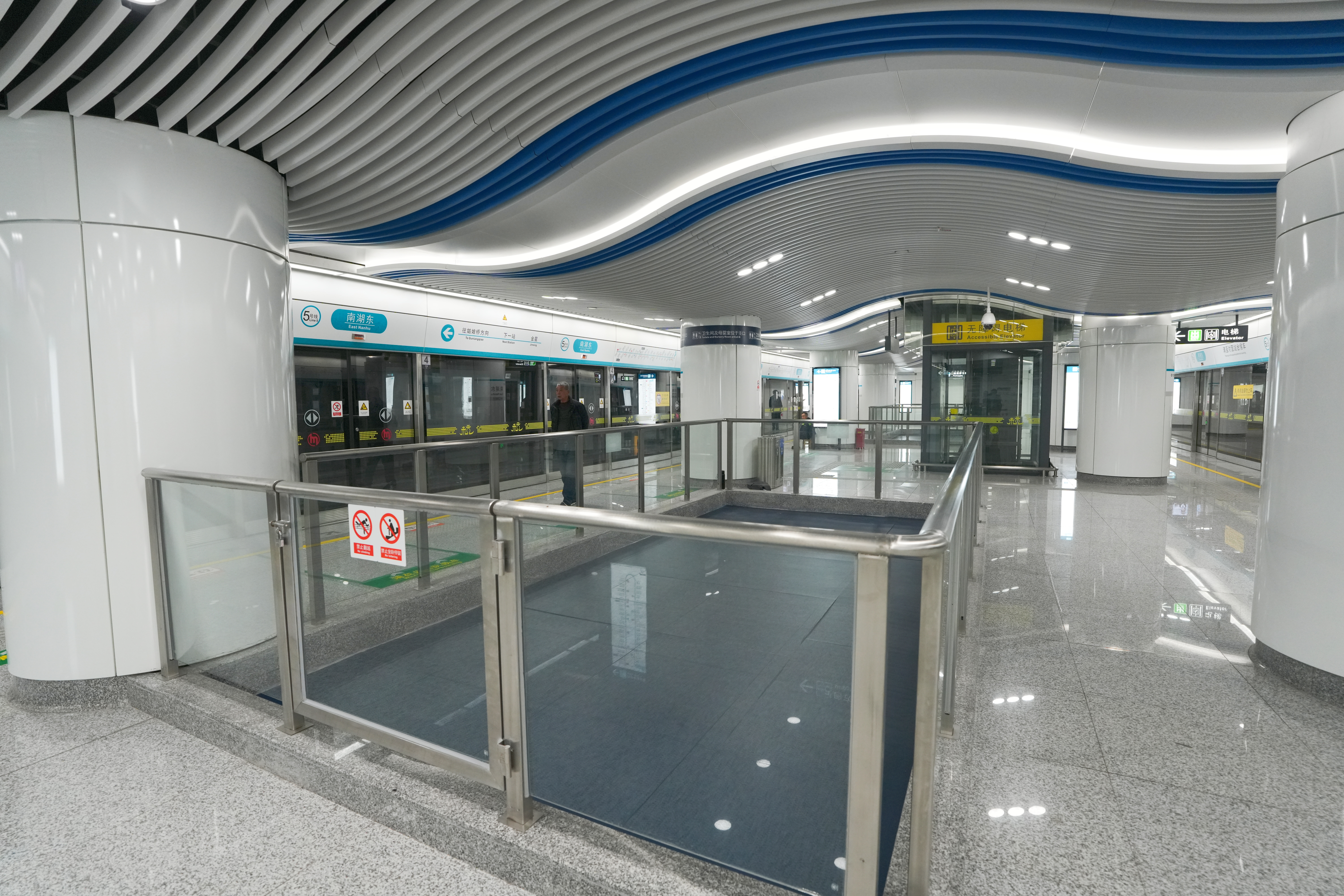
Preservation for Line 13

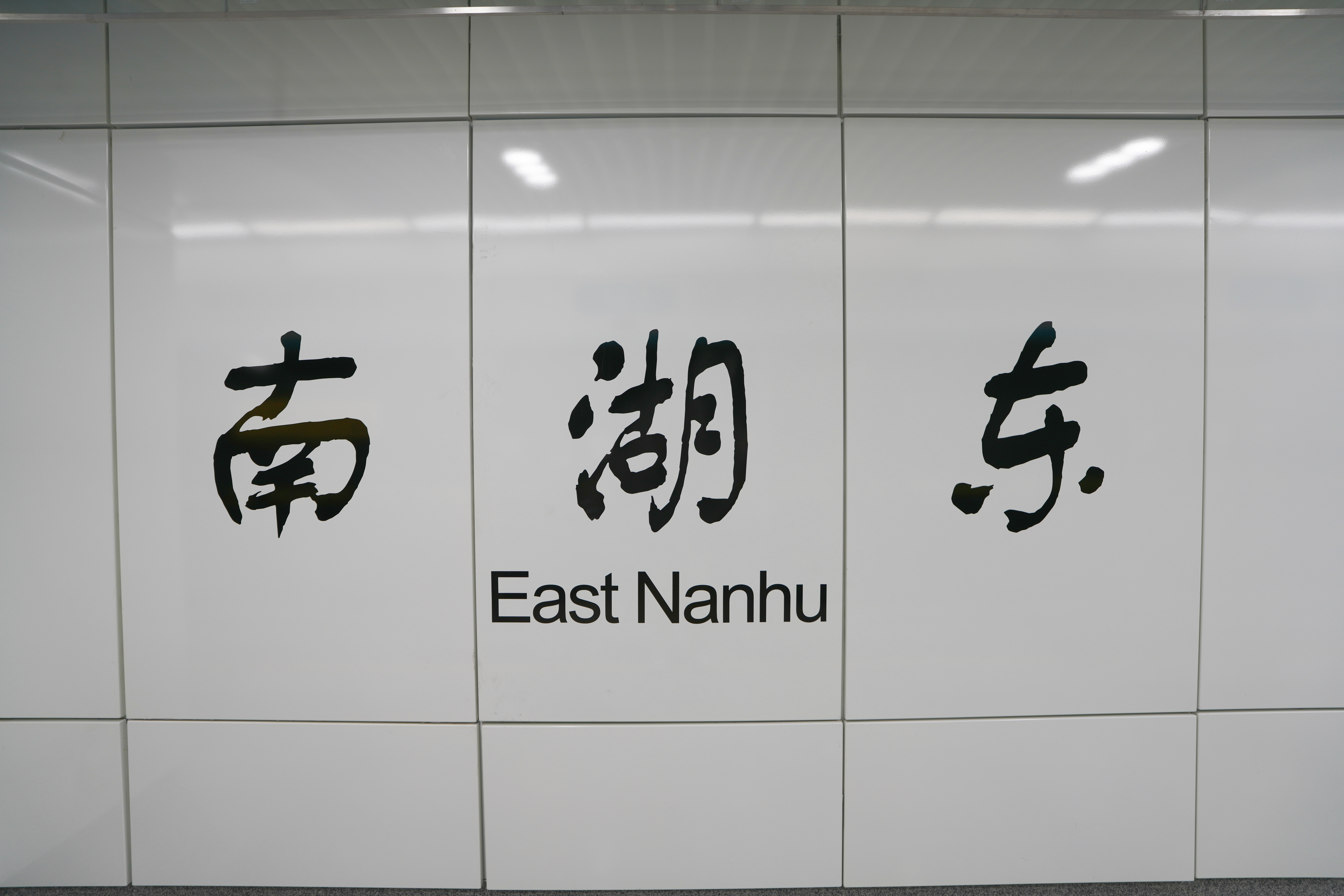
Station in traditional Chinese calligraphy

== Entrances/exits ==
- A: north side of Fengxin Road, east side of Yuhang Road
- B: north side of Fengxin Road, west side of Yuhang Road
- D: south side of Fengxin Road, west side of Yuhang Road
- E: south side of Fengxin Road, east side of Yuhang Road
