= Guniangqiao station =

Metro station in China

Guniangqiao 姑娘桥
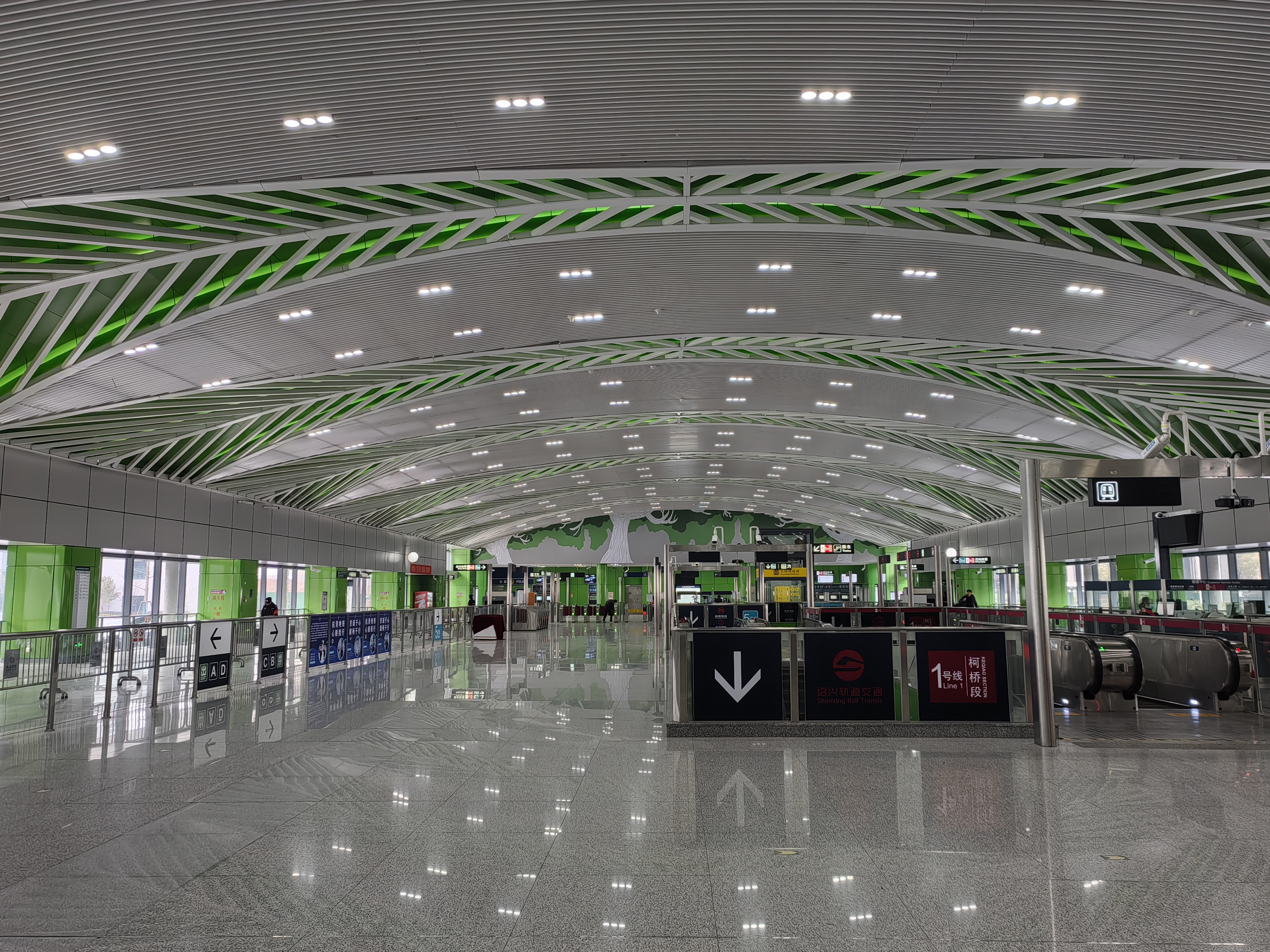
- Concourse

General information
- Location: Caihong Avenue; Xiaoshan District, Hangzhou, Zhejiang; China
- Coordinates: 30°10′42″N 120°19′33″E
- Operator: Hangzhou MTR Line 5 Corporation Limited (Hangzhou Line 5); Shaoxing Jingyue Metro Corporation Limited (Shaoxing Line 1)
- Lines: Line 5 (Hangzhou Metro); Line 1 (Shaoxing Metro)
- Platforms: 4 (2 island platforms)

Construction
- Structure type: Underground

Other information
- Station code: GNQ

History
- Opened: April 23, 2020 (Hangzhou Line 5); June 28, 2021 (Shaoxing Line 1)

Services
Preceding station	Hangzhou Metro	Following station
Shuangqiao towards East Nanhu	Line 5	Terminus
Preceding station	Shaoxing Metro	Following station
Terminus	Line 1	Yaqian towards Fangquan
Location

Guniangqiao (Chinese: 姑娘桥) is a metro station on Line 5 of Hangzhou Metro and Line 1 of Shaoxing Metro in Zhejiang province, China. It is located in Xiaoshan District, Hangzhou.

It is the eastern terminus of Hangzhou Metro Line 5 and the western terminus of Shaoxing Metro Line 1.

== Station layout ==
The Guniangqiao metro station has three levels: a concourse, and separate levels for Hangzhou Metro Line 5 and Shaoxing Metro Line 1. Each of these consists of an island platform with two tracks.

== Entrances/exits ==
- A: Caihong Avenue
- B: Caihong Avenue
- C: Guxiao Line
- D: Tangmei Line

== Gallery ==
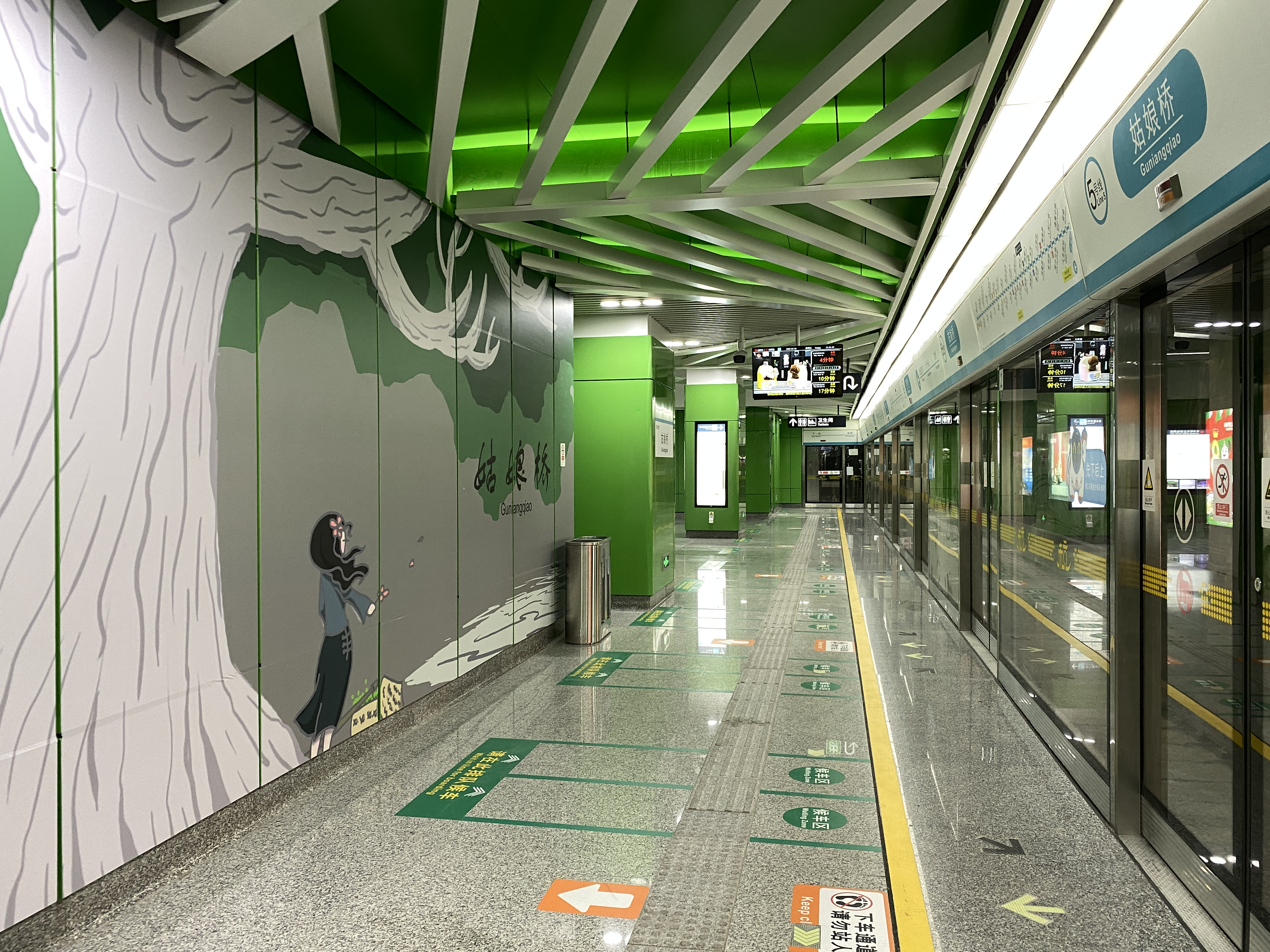
Hangzhou Metro platform

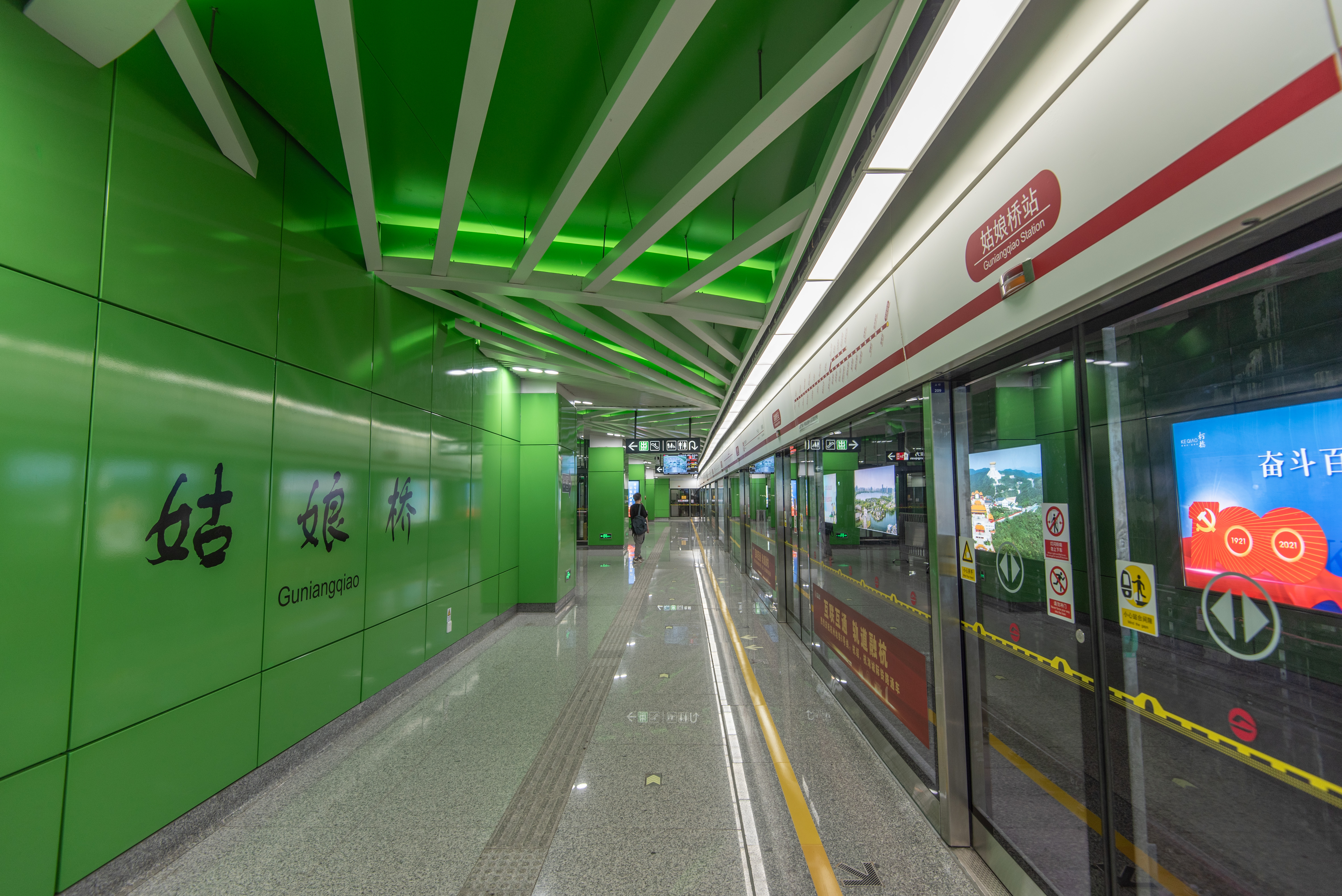
Shaoxing Metro platform
