= Mingshi Road station =

Metro station in Hangzhou, China

Mingshi Road 明石路
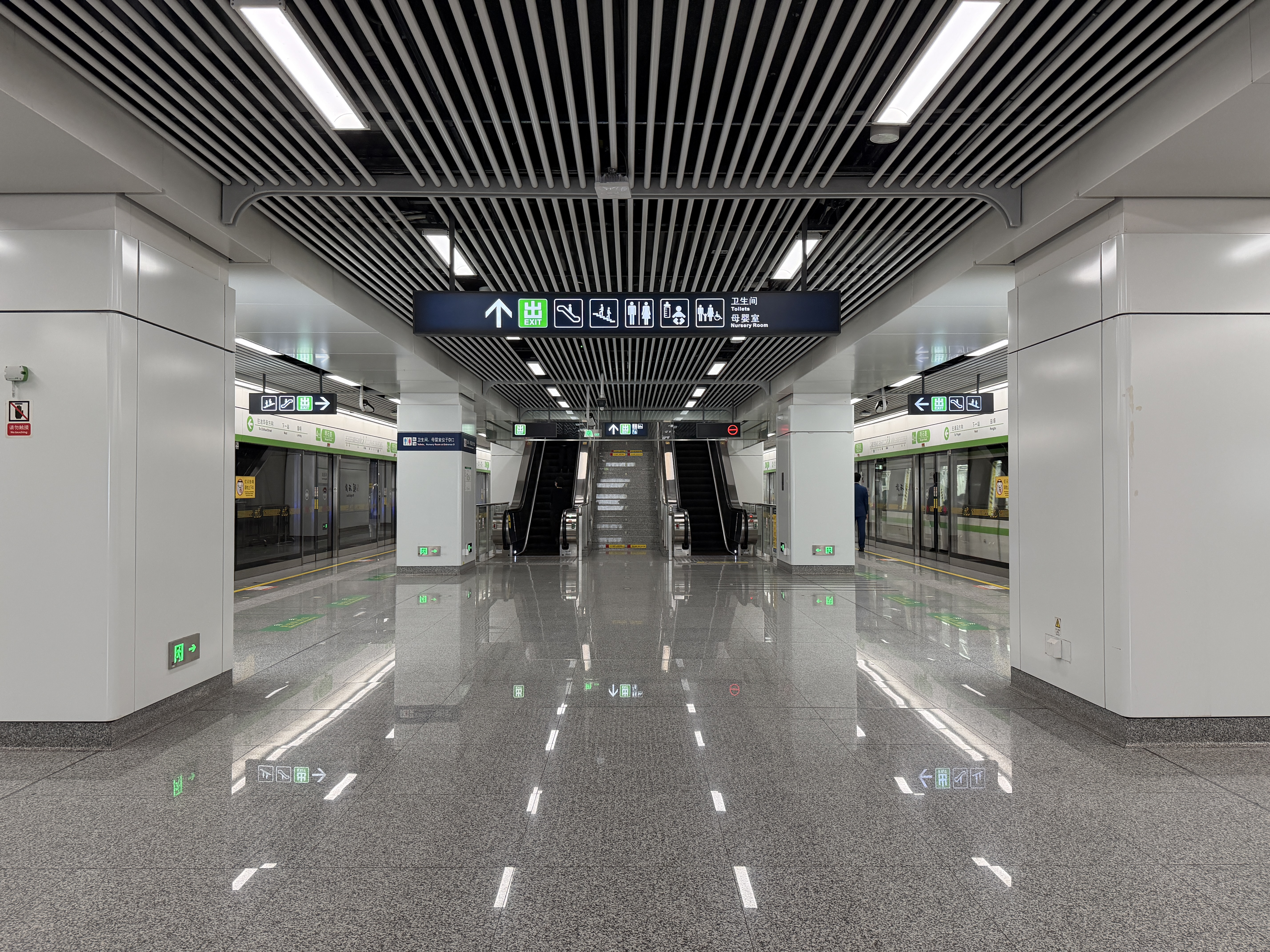
- Platforms

General information
- Location: Mingshi Road × Tiancheng Road/Huanzhan Road (N); Shangcheng District, Hangzhou, Zhejiang; China
- Coordinates: 30°18′22″N 120°13′22″E
- Operated by: Hangzhou Metro Corporation
- Line: Line 4
- Platforms: 2 (1 island platform)

Construction
- Structure type: Underground
- Accessible: Yes

History
- Opened: 21 February 2022

Services
Preceding station	Hangzhou Metro	Following station
Pengbu towards Puyan	Line 4	Liming towards Chihua Street
Location

Mingshi Road (Chinese: 明石路) is a metro station of Line 4 of the Hangzhou Metro in China. It is located in Shangcheng District of Hangzhou. The station was opened on 21 February 2022.

== Station structure ==
Mingshi Road has two levels: a concourse, and an island platform with two tracks for line 4.

== Entrances/exits ==
- A: east side of Mingshi Road, Desheng Road (E)
- B1 & B2: west side of Mingshi Road, Huanzhan Road (N)
- C1: west side of Mingshi Road, north side of Tiancheng Road
- C2: west side of Mingshi Road, south side of Tiancheng Road
- D1: east side of Mingshi Road, north side of Tiancheng Road
- D2: east side of Mingshi Road, south side of Tiancheng Road
