= Ducheng Ecopark station =

Metro station in Hangzhou, China

Ducheng Ecopark 独城生态公园
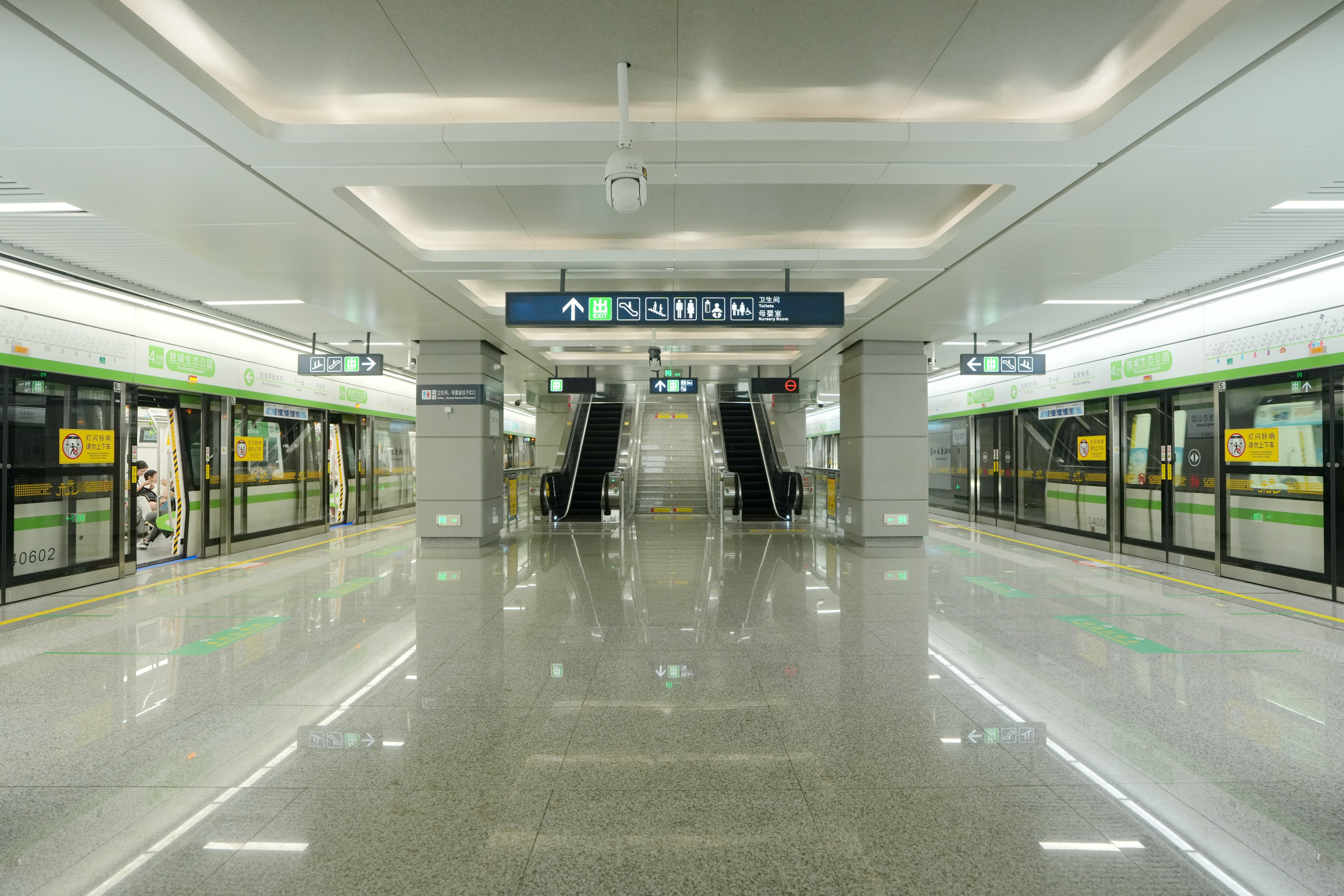

General information
- Location: Gongshu District, Hangzhou, Zhejiang; China
- Coordinates: 30°21′34.20″N 120°9′26.89″E
- Operated by: Hangzhou Metro Corporation
- Line: Line 4
- Platforms: 2 (1 island platform)

Services
Preceding station	Hangzhou Metro	Following station
Wujiajiaogang towards Puyan	Line 4	Ping'an Bridge towards Chihua Street
Location

Ducheng Ecopark (Chinese: 独城生态公园) is a metro station of Line 4 of the Hangzhou Metro in China. It is located in Gongshu District of Hangzhou. Because of the slow development caused by soil pollution remediation on the site of Hangzhou Iron & Steel Group, this station was opened for operation on July 26, 2025.
