= Taoyuan Street station =

Metro station in Hangzhou, China

Taoyuan Street 桃源街
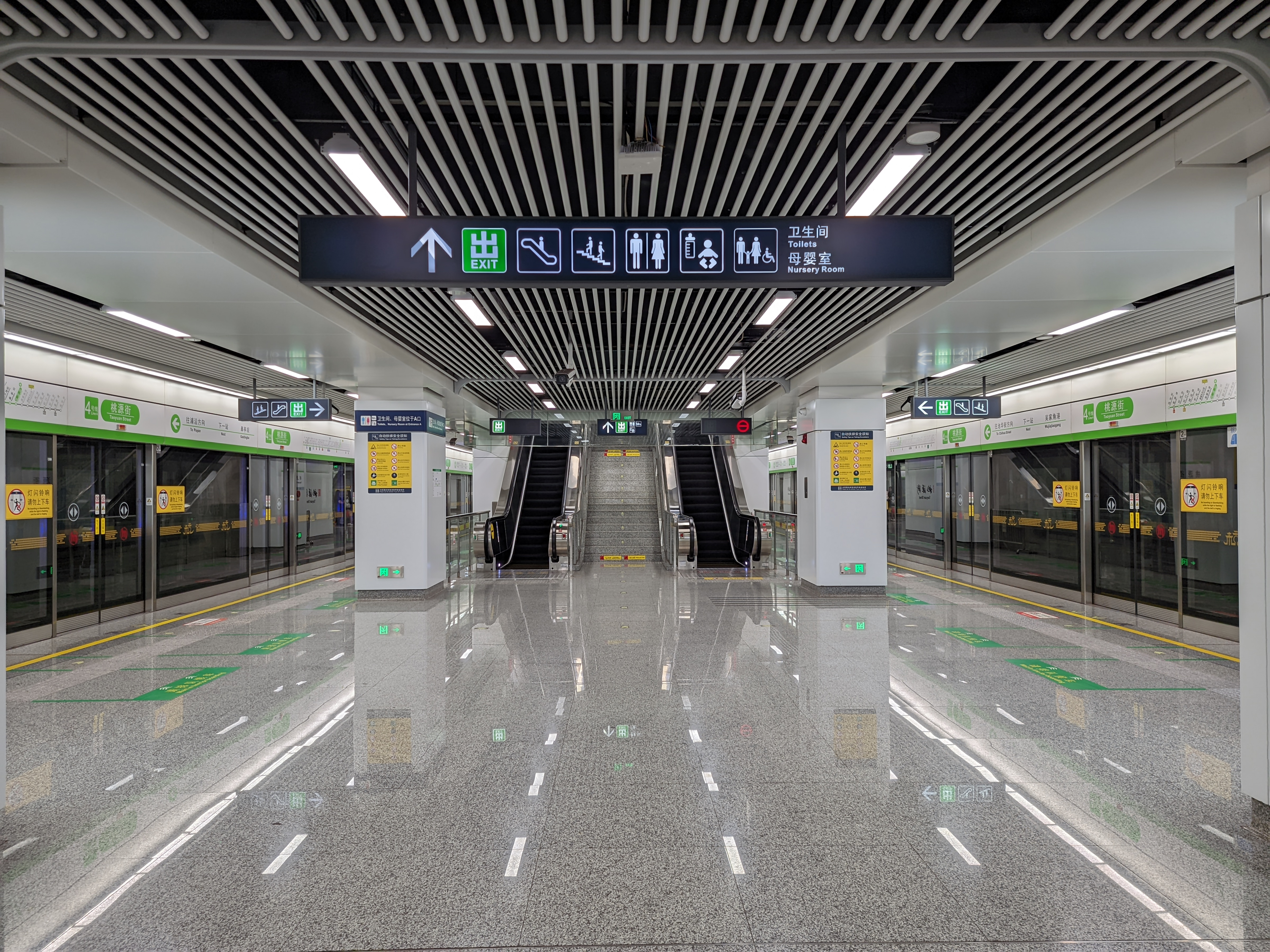
- Platforms

General information
- Location: Hangzhou Gongshu Powerlong Plaza; Gongshu District, Hangzhou, Zhejiang; China
- Coordinates: 30°20′36″N 120°10′26″E
- System: Hangzhou metro station
- Operator: Hangzhou Metro Corporation
- Line: Line 4
- Platforms: 2 (1 island platform)

Construction
- Structure type: Underground
- Accessible: Yes

History
- Opened: 21 February 2022

Services
Preceding station	Hangzhou Metro	Following station
Gaotingba towards Puyan	Line 4	Wujiajiaogang towards Chihua Street
Location

Taoyuan Street (Chinese: 桃源街) is a metro station of Line 4 of the Hangzhou Metro in China. It is located in Gongshu District of Hangzhou. The station was opened on 21 February 2022.

== Station layout ==
Taoyuan Street has two levels: a concourse, and an island platform with two tracks for line 4.

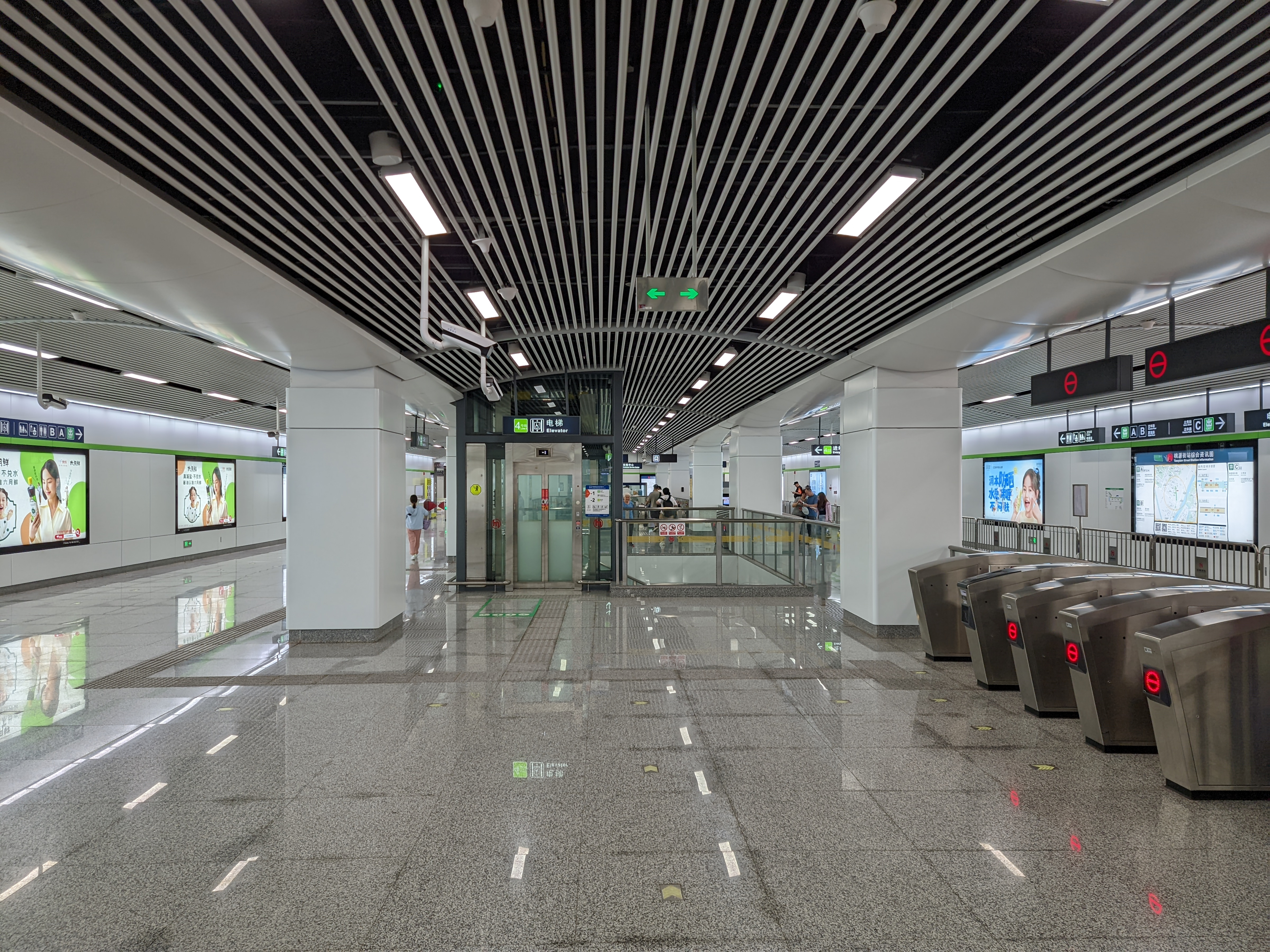
Concourse

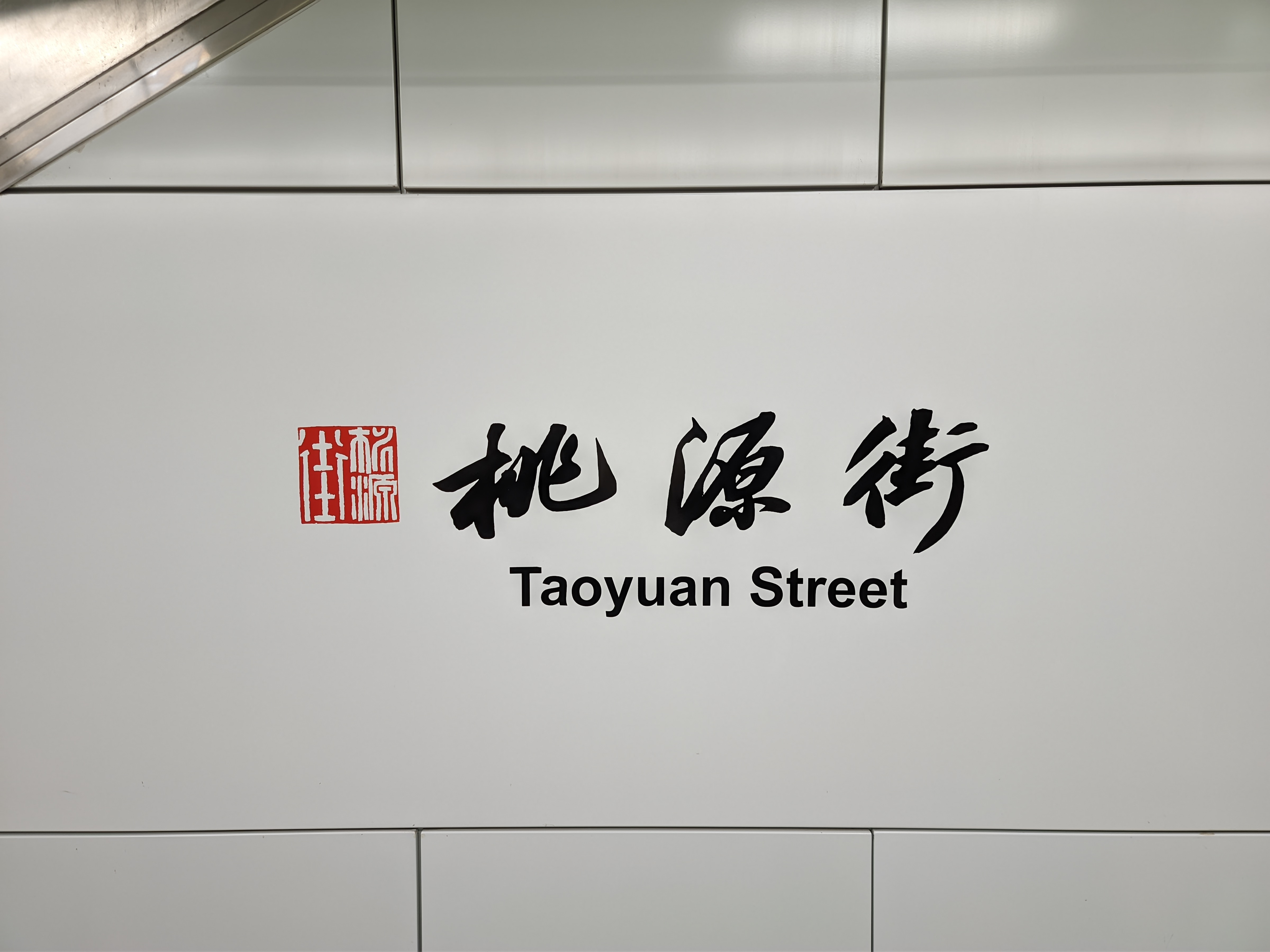
Station name in Chinese calligraphy

== Entrances/exits ==
- A: Hangzhou Gongshu Powerlong Plaza
- B: Wangchen Mingdi Community
- C: Hangzhou Gongshu Powerlong Plaza
