= Wujiajiaogang station =

Metro station in Hangzhou, China

Wujiajiaogang 吴家角港
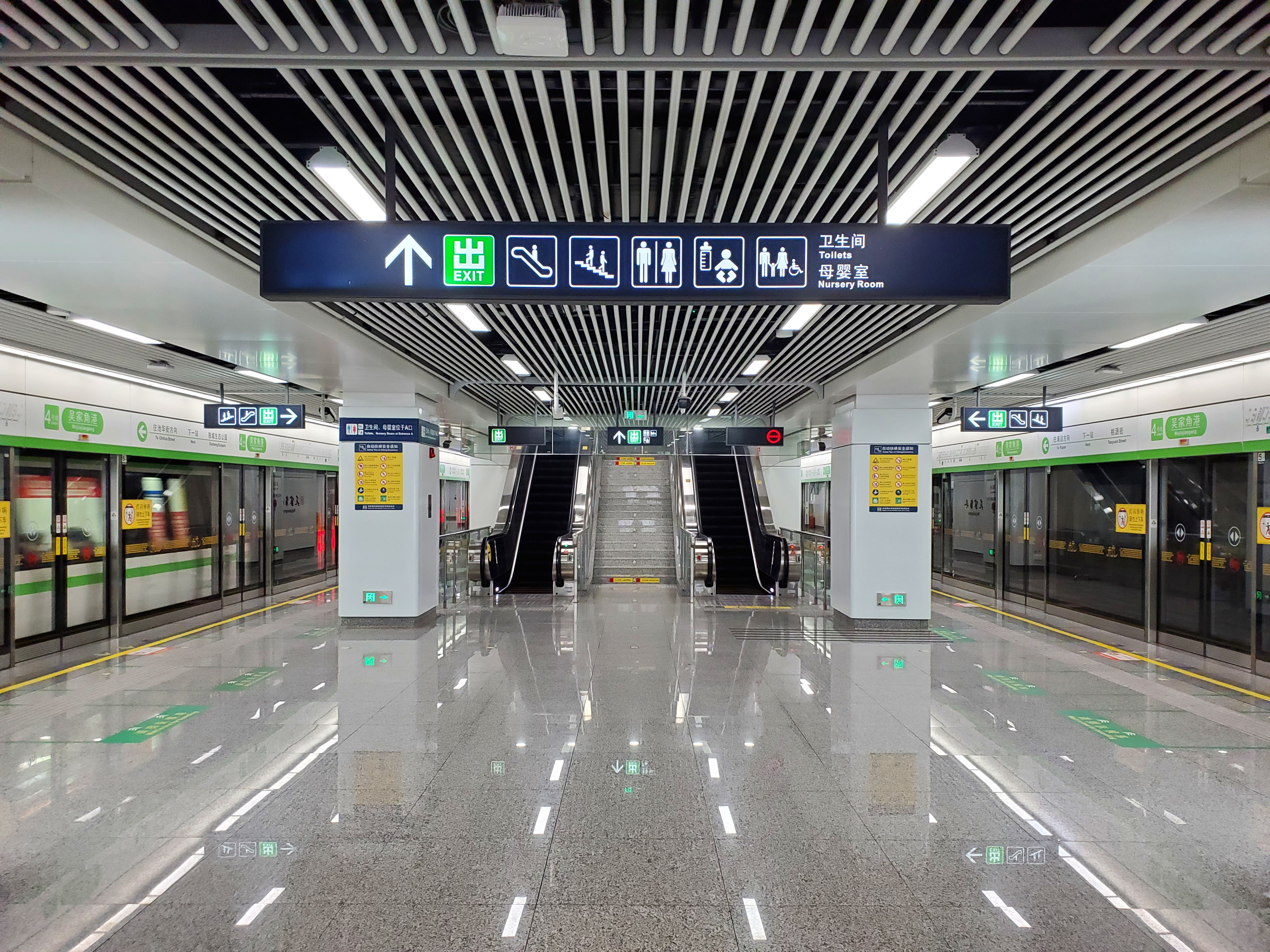
- Platforms

General information
- Location: Hetang Street × Jingshen Street; Gongshu District, Hangzhou, Zhejiang; China
- Coordinates: 30°21′12″N 120°09′52″E
- System: Hangzhou metro station
- Operator: Hangzhou Metro Corporation
- Line: Line 4
- Platforms: 2 (1 island platform)
- Tracks: 2

Construction
- Structure type: Underground
- Platform levels: 1
- Accessible: Yes

History
- Opened: 21 February 2022

Services
Preceding station	Hangzhou Metro	Following station
Taoyuan Street towards Puyan	Line 4	Ducheng Ecopark towards Chihua Street
Location

Wujiajiaogang (simplified Chinese: 吴家角港; traditional Chinese: 吳家角港) is a metro station of Line 4 of the Hangzhou Metro in China. It is located in Gongshu District of Hangzhou. The station was opened on 21 February 2022.

== Station layout ==
Wujiajiaogang has two levels: a concourse, and an island platform with two tracks for line 4.

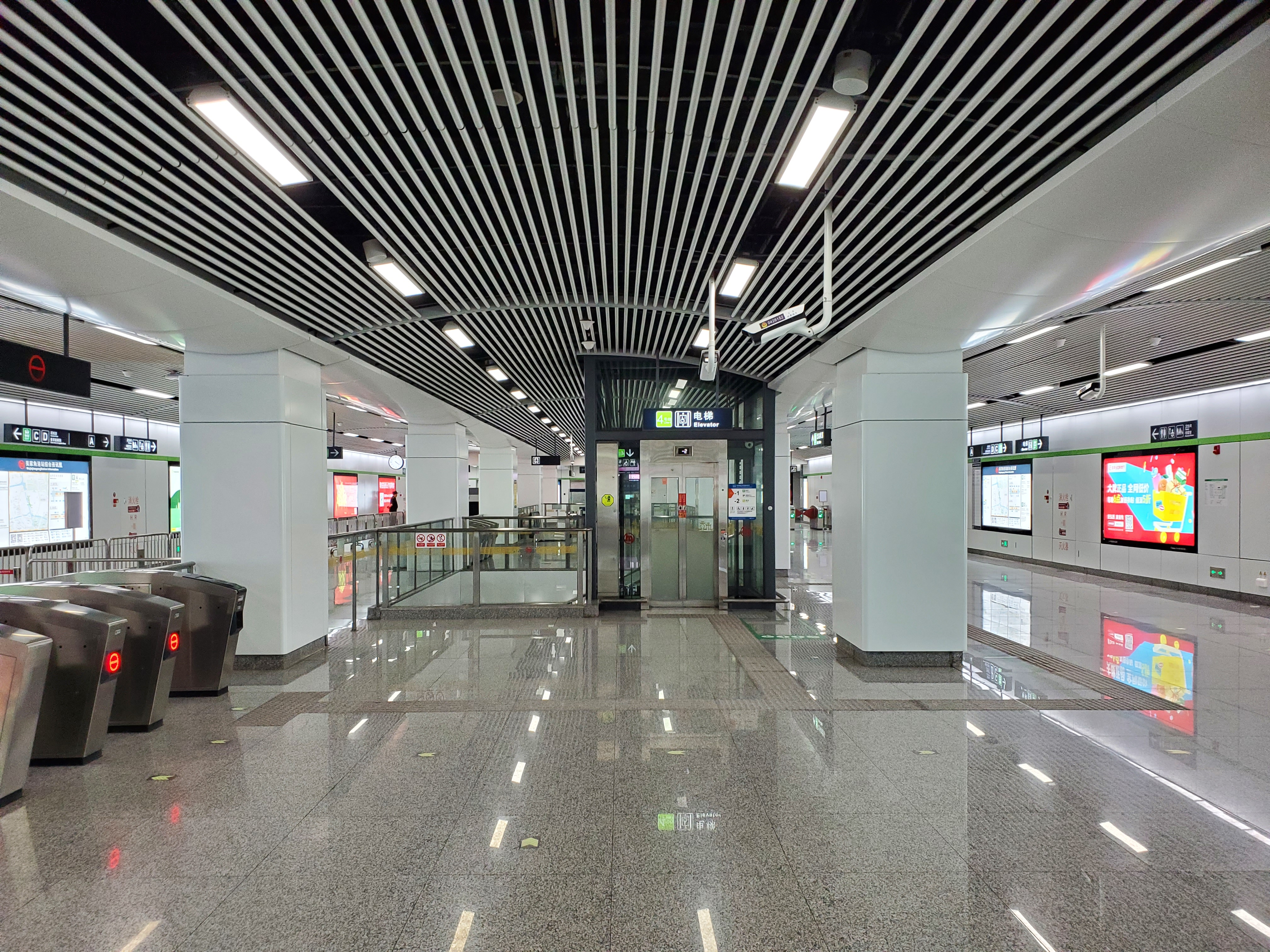
Concourse

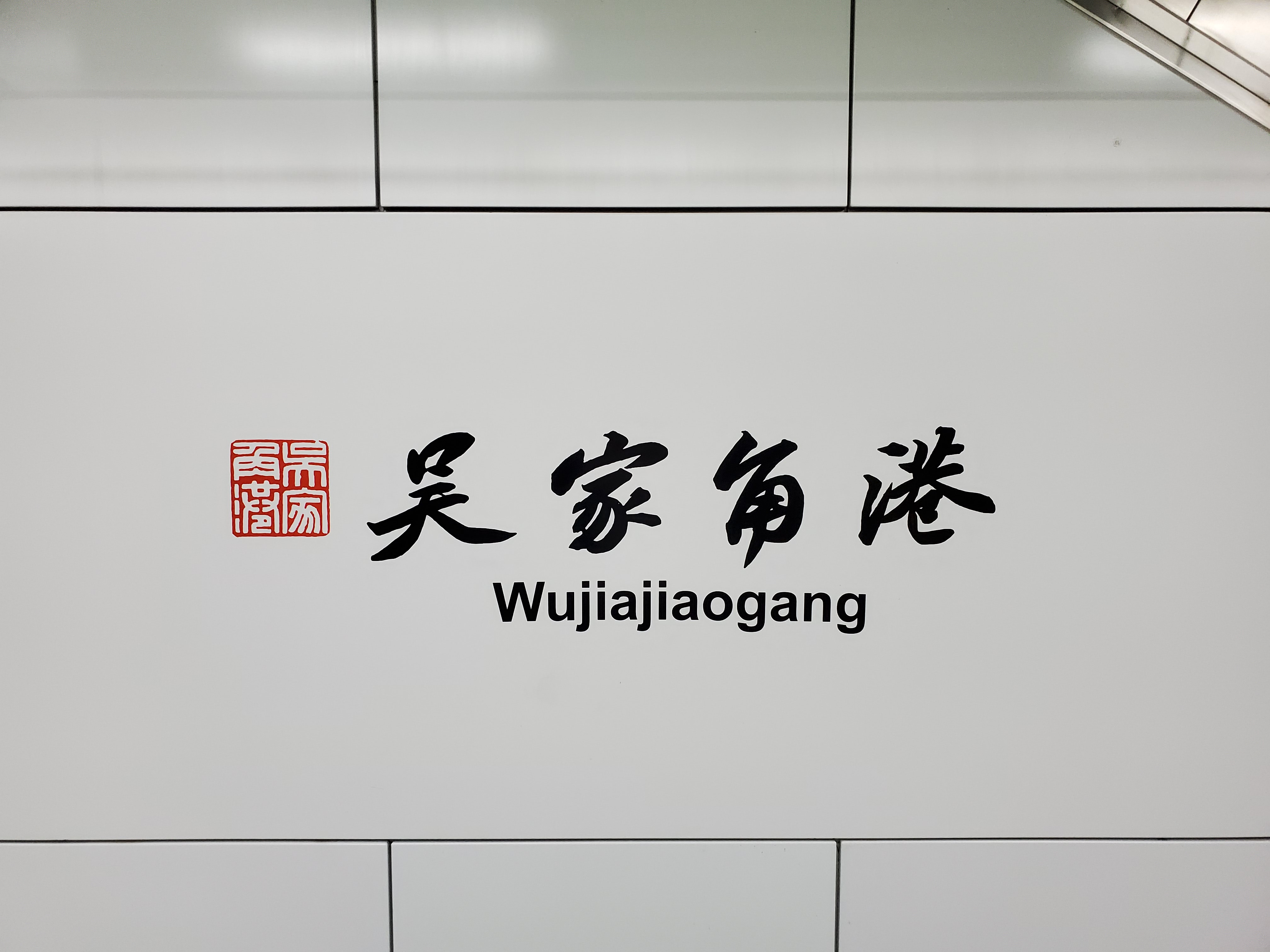
Station name in Chinese calligraphy

== Entrances/exits ==
There are 4 exits.

- A: east side of Hetang Street, Jinchang Road
- B: west side of Hetang Street, Jinchang Road
- C: west side of Hetang Street, south side of Jingshen Street
- D: east side of Hetang Street, Guantao Road
