= Chengxing Road station =

Metro station in Hangzhou, China

Coordinates: 30°14′30″N 120°12′07″E

Chengxing Road 城星路
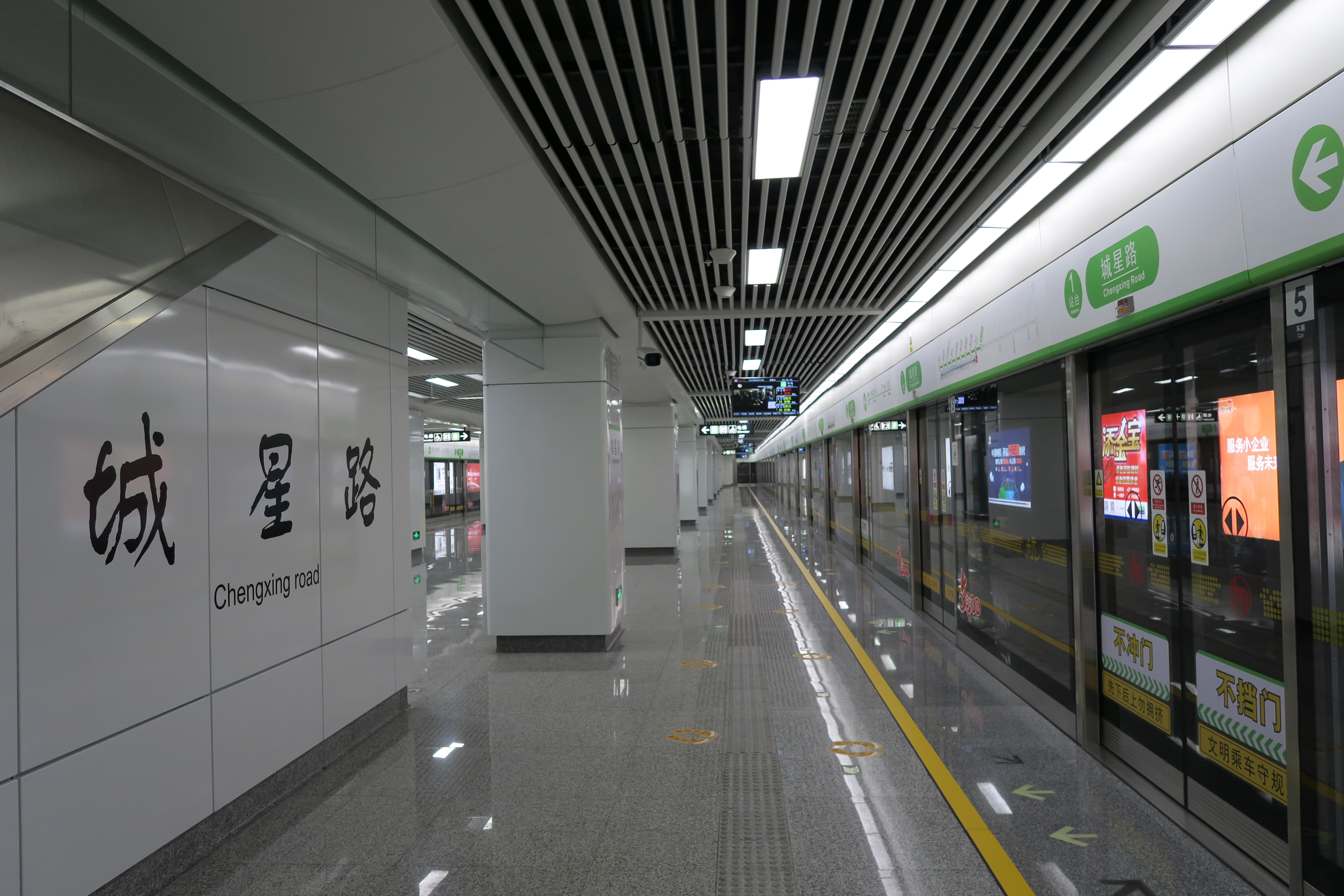
- Platform

General information
- Location: Shangcheng District, Hangzhou, Zhejiang; China
- Operated by: Hangzhou Metro Corporation
- Line(s): Line 4
- Platforms: 2 (1 island platform)

History
- Opened: February 2, 2015

Services
Preceding station	Hangzhou Metro	Following station
Jinjiang towards Puyan	Line 4	Citizen Center towards Chihua Street

Chengxing Road (Chinese: 城星路) is a metro station on Line 4 of the Hangzhou Metro in China. It is located in the Shangcheng District of Hangzhou.
