= Lianzhuang station =

Metro station in China

Lianzhuang 联庄
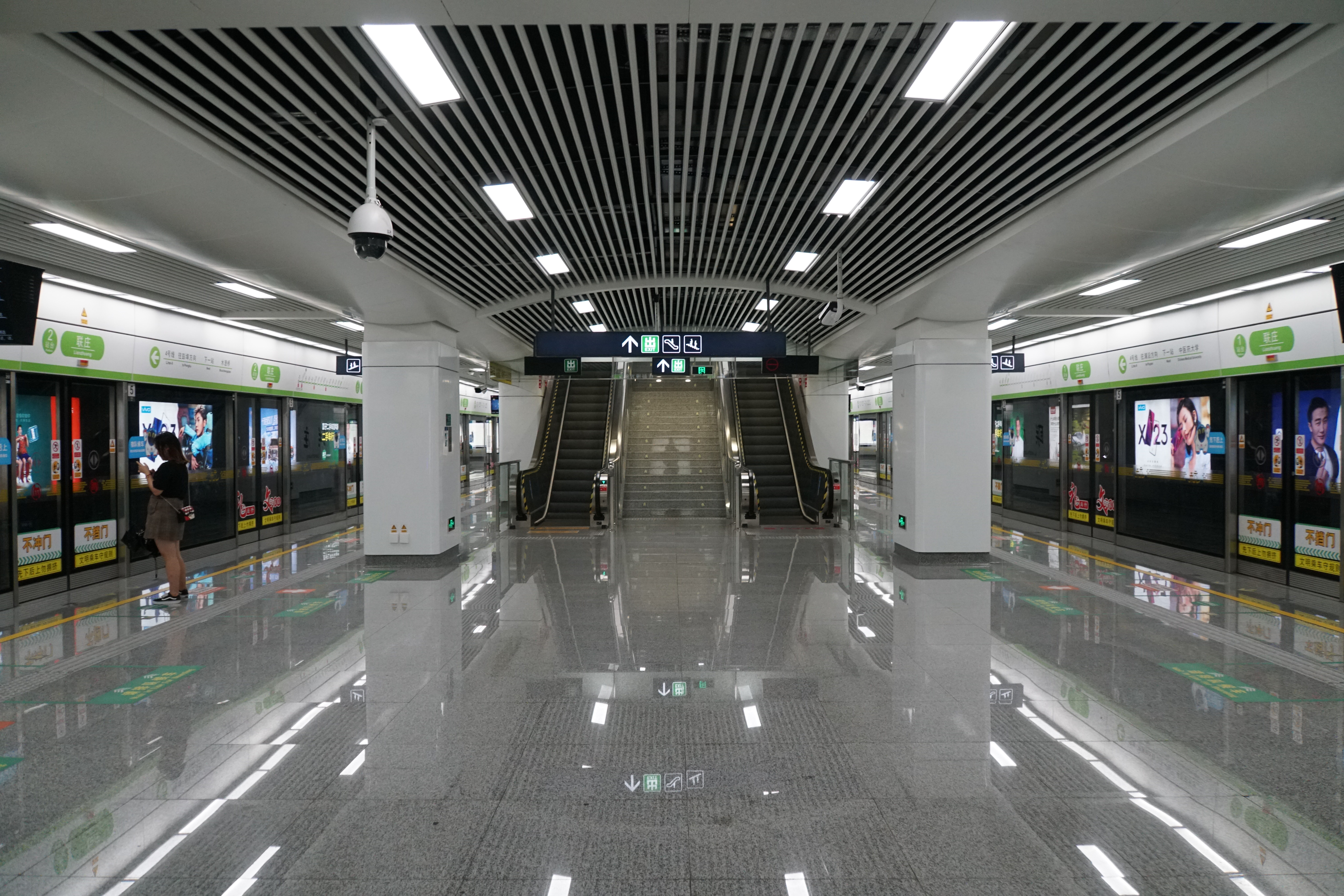

General information
- Location: Binjiang District, Hangzhou, Zhejiang; China
- Operated by: Hangzhou Metro Corporation
- Line: Line 4
- Platforms: 2 (1 island platform)

History
- Opened: June 6, 2018

Services
Preceding station	Hangzhou Metro	Following station
Zhejiang Chinese Medical University towards Puyan	Line 4	Shuicheng Bridge towards Chihua Street
Location

Lianzhuang (Chinese: 联庄) is a metro station on Line 4 of the Hangzhou Metro in China. It is located in the Binjiang District of Hangzhou.
