= South Huazhong Road station =

Metro station in Hangzhou, China

South Huazhong Road 华中南路
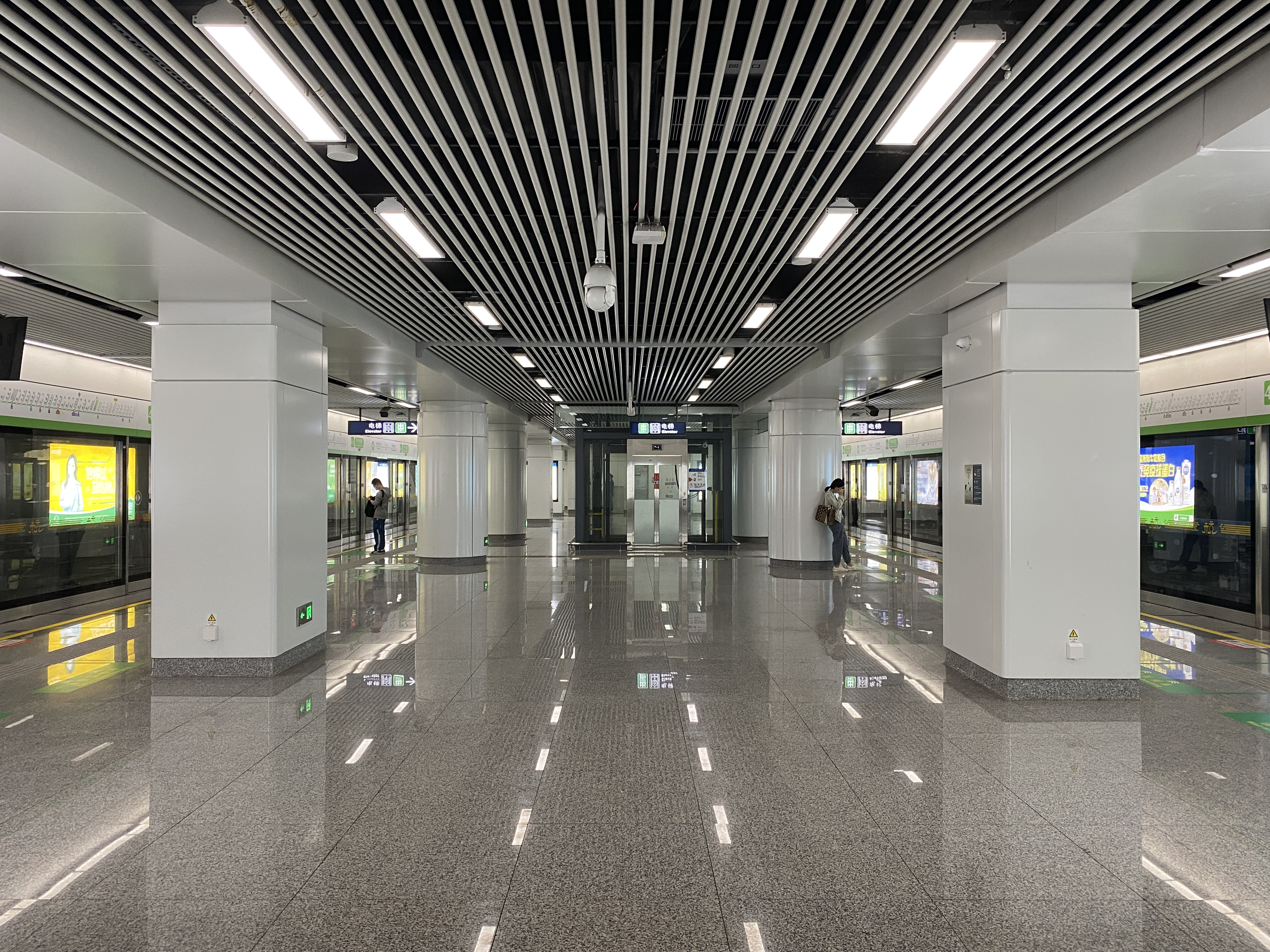
- Platforms

General information
- Location: Xingye Street × Huazhong Road (S); Gongshu District, Hangzhou, Zhejiang; China
- Coordinates: 30.3264°N 120.1970°E
- System: Hangzhou metro station
- Operator: Hangzhou Metro Corporation
- Line: Line 4
- Platforms: 2 (1 island platform)

Construction
- Structure type: Underground
- Accessible: Yes

History
- Opened: 21 February 2022

Services
Preceding station	Hangzhou Metro	Following station
Jianqiao Old Street towards Puyan	Line 4	Xintiandi Street towards Chihua Street
Location

South Huazhong Road (simplified Chinese: 华中南路; traditional Chinese: 華中南路) is a metro station of Line 4 of the Hangzhou Metro in China. It is located in Gongshu District of Hangzhou. The station was opened on 21 February 2022.

== Station layout ==
South Huazhong Road has two levels: a concourse, and an island platform with two tracks for line 4.

According to the plan, line 6 will also pass through in the future. During the construction of line 4, space was already reserved for line 6. The platform for line 6 will be located on the basement 3 and will also be an island platform.

== Entrances/exits ==
- A: north side of Xingye Street, east side of Huazhong Road (S)
- D1 & D2: north side of Xingye Street, west side of Huazhong Road (S)
- F1 & F2: south side of Xingye Street., west side of Huazhong Road (S)
- G: east side of Huazhong Road (S), Yuzhang Road
