= Shuicheng Bridge station =

Metro station in Hangzhou, China

Shuicheng Bridge 水澄桥
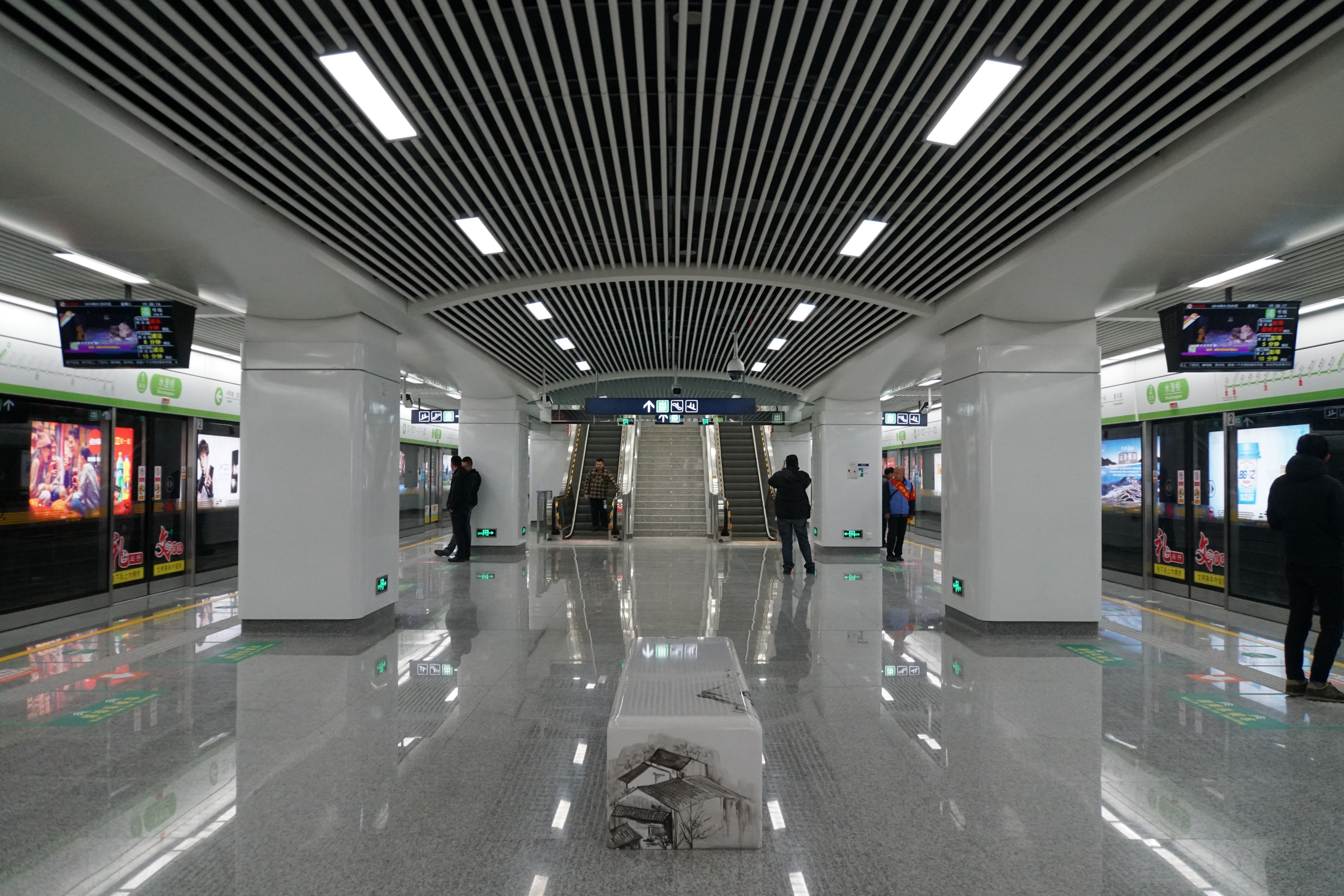

General information
- Location: Shangcheng District, Hangzhou, Zhejiang; China
- Operated by: Hangzhou Metro Corporation
- Line: Line 4
- Platforms: 2 (1 island platform)

History
- Opened: January 9, 2018
- Previous names: Shuichengqiao

Services
Preceding station	Hangzhou Metro	Following station
Lianzhuang towards Puyan	Line 4	Fuxing Road towards Chihua Street
Location

Shuicheng Bridge (Chinese: 水澄桥), formerly known as Shuichengqiao, is a metro station on Line 4 of the Hangzhou Metro in China. It is located in the Shangcheng District of Hangzhou.
