= Liming station =

Metro station in Hangzhou, China

Liming 黎明
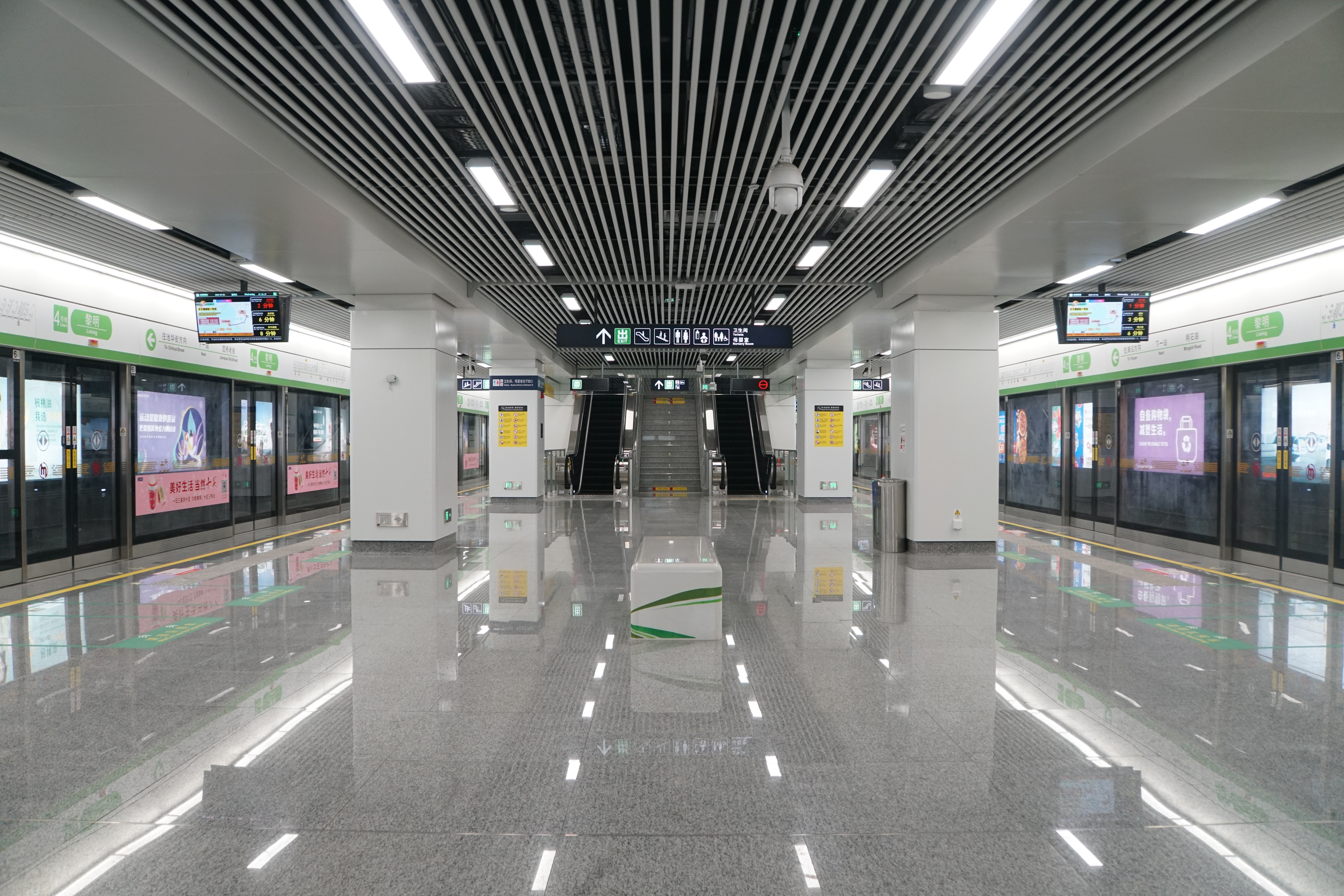
- Platform

General information
- Location: Shangcheng District, Hangzhou, Zhejiang; China
- Coordinates: 30.3176°N 120.2190°E
- Operated by: Hangzhou Metro Corporation
- Line: Line 4
- Platforms: 2 (1 island platform)

History
- Opened: 21 February 2022

Services
Preceding station	Hangzhou Metro	Following station
Mingshi Road towards Puyan	Line 4	Jianqiao Old Street towards Chihua Street
Location

Liming (Chinese: 黎明) is a metro station of Line 4 of the Hangzhou Metro in China. It is located in Shangcheng District of Hangzhou. The station was opened on 21 February 2022.

== Entrances/exits ==
There are 4 exits.

- A: east side of Mingshi Rd.
- B: west side of Mingshi Rd., Jichang Rd.
- C: west side of Mingshi Rd., Kui'en Aly.
- D: east side of Mingshi Rd., Xiangbu Rd.
