= Yongjiang Road station =

Metro station in China

Yongjiang Road 甬江路
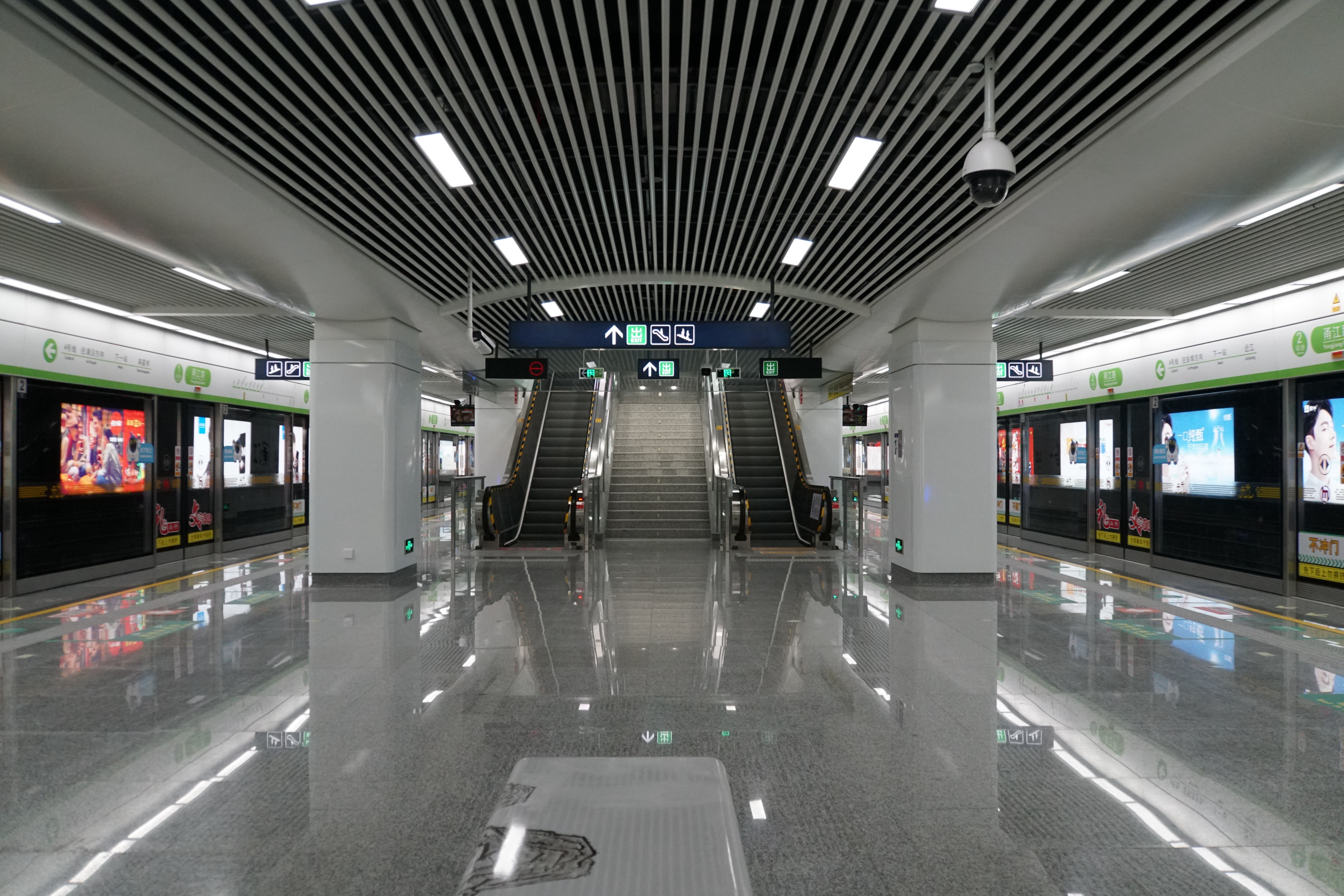

General information
- Location: Shangcheng District, Hangzhou, Zhejiang; China
- Operated by: Hangzhou Metro Corporation
- Line: Line 4
- Platforms: 2 (1 island platform)

History
- Opened: January 9, 2018

Services
Preceding station	Hangzhou Metro	Following station
Nanxingqiao towards Puyan	Line 4	Jinjiang towards Chihua Street
Location

Yongjiang Road (Chinese: 甬江路) is a metro station on Line 4 of the Hangzhou Metro in China. It is located in the Shangcheng District of Hangzhou.
