= Chuyun Road station =

Metro station in Hangzhou, China

Chuyun Road 储运路
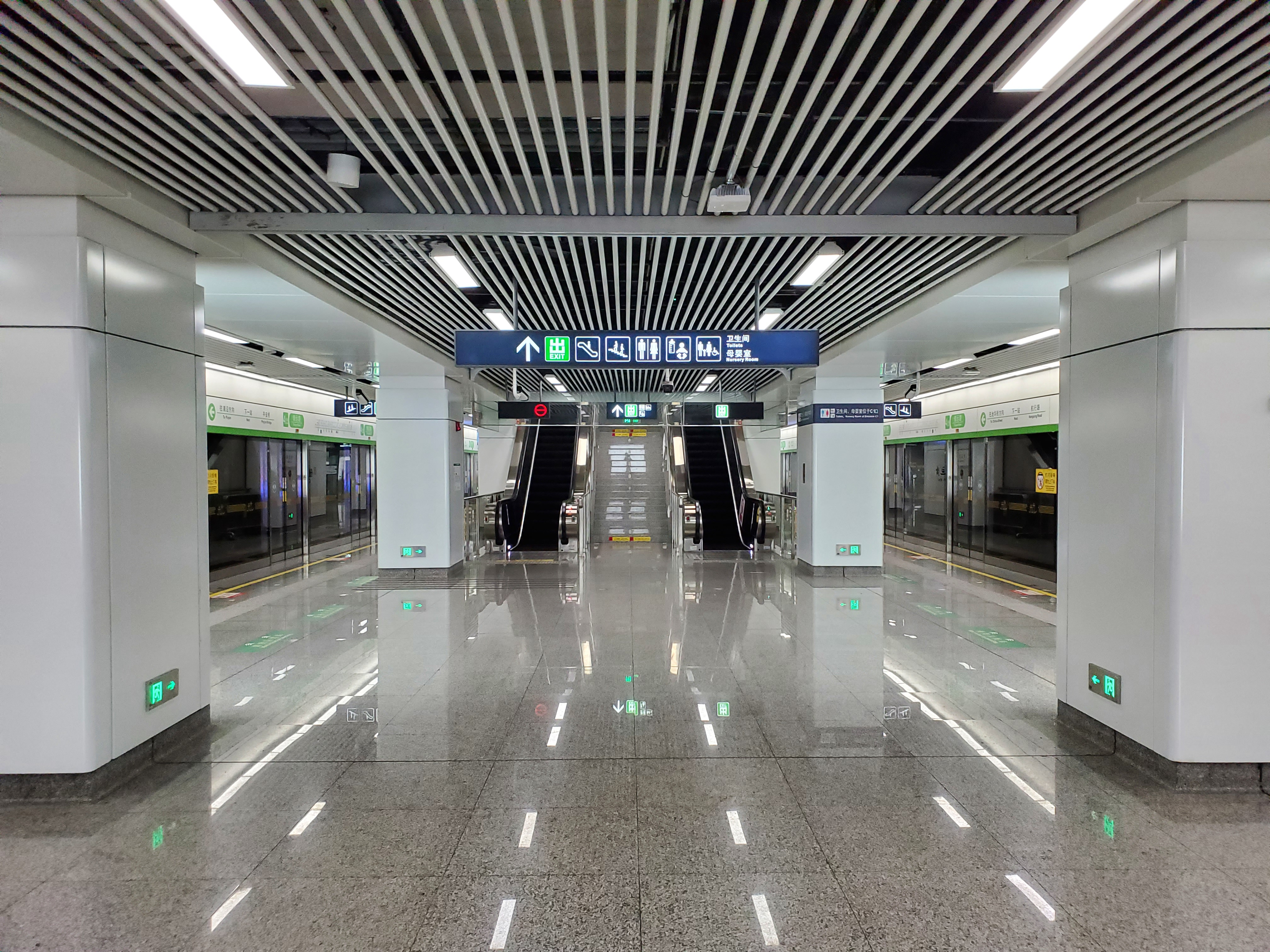
- Platforms

General information
- Location: Liangyun Street (良运街) × Chuyun Road; Yuhang District, Hangzhou, Zhejiang; China
- Coordinates: 30°21′22″N 120°07′27″E
- Operated by: Hangzhou Metro Corporation
- Line: Line 4
- Platforms: 2 (1 island platform)

Construction
- Structure type: Underground
- Accessible: Yes

History
- Opened: 21 February 2022

Services
Preceding station	Hangzhou Metro	Following station
Ping'an Bridge towards Puyan	Line 4	Hangxing Road towards Chihua Street
Location

Chuyun Road (simplified Chinese: 储运路; traditional Chinese: 儲運路) is a metro station of Line 4 of the Hangzhou Metro in China. It is located in Yuhang District of Hangzhou. The station was opened on 21 February 2022.

== Station layout ==
Chuyun Road has two levels: a concourse, and an island platform with two tracks for line 4.

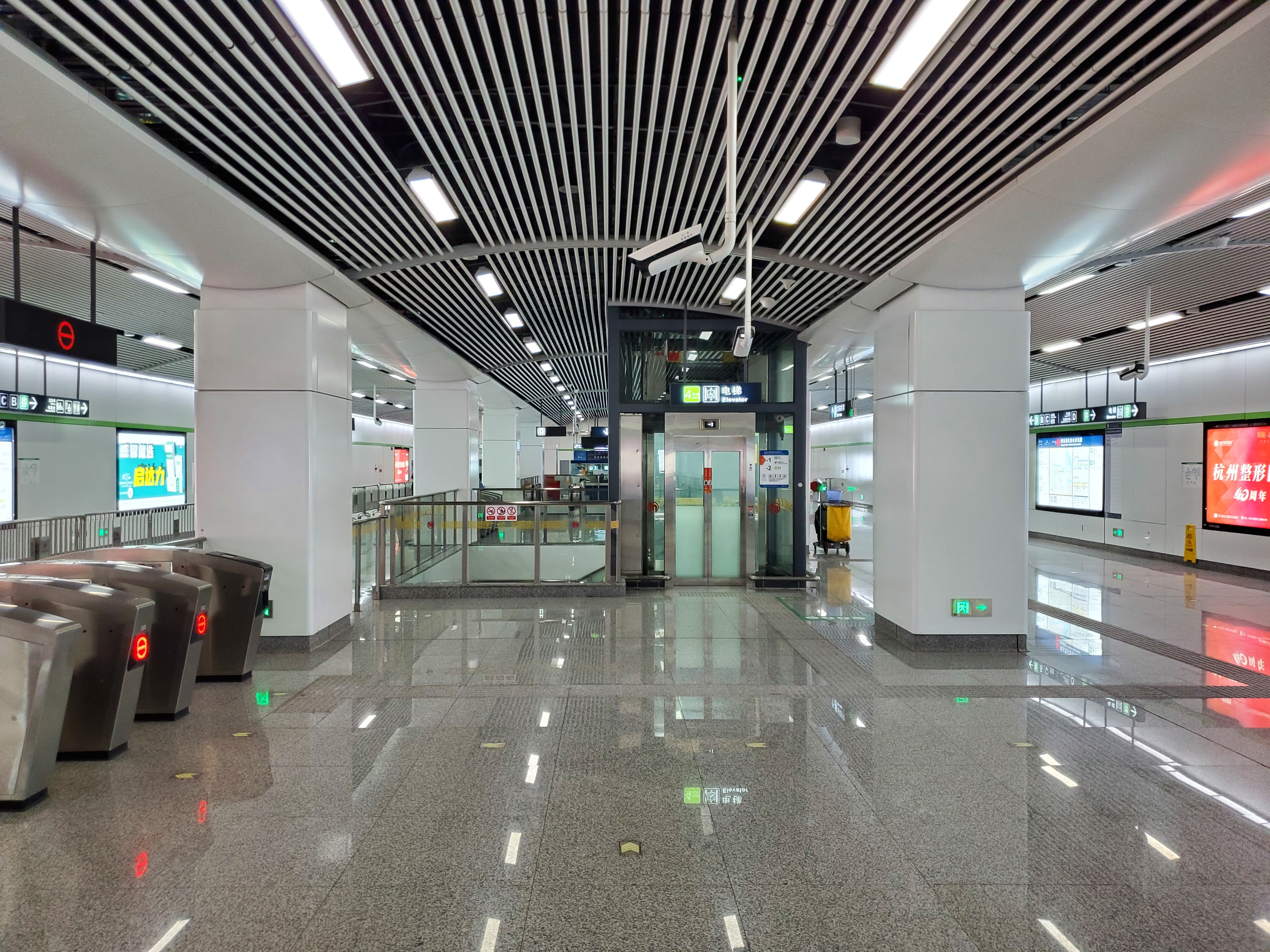
Concourse

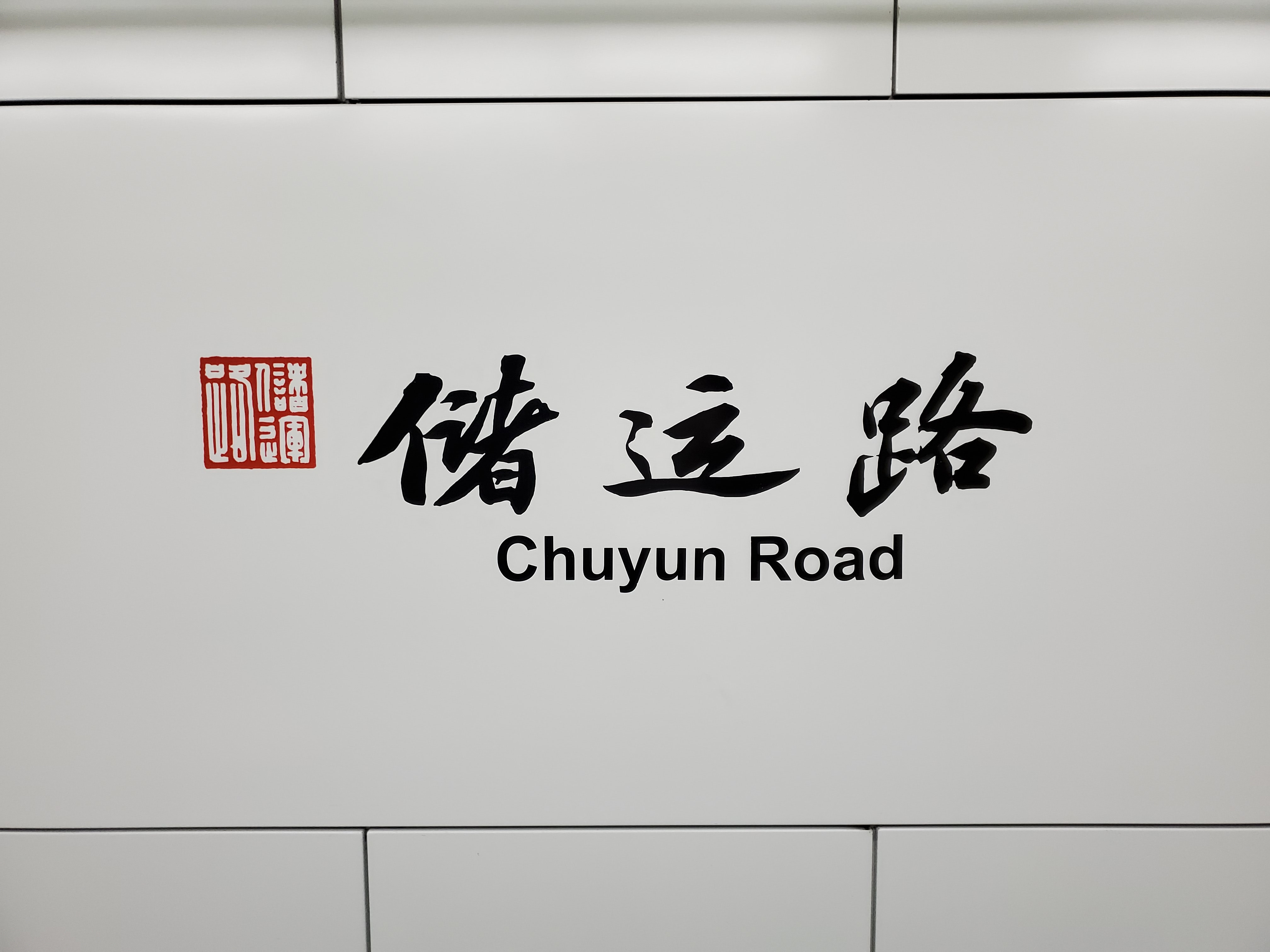
Station name in Chinese calligraphy

== Entrances/exits ==
There are 6 exits.

- A: east side of Chuyun Road, north side of Liangyun Street
- B: west side of Chuyun Road, north side of Liangyun Street
- C1: west side of Chuyun Road, south side of Liangyun Street, Xiawei Street
- C2: south side of Liangyun Street, Tongyi Road
- C3: north side of Liangyun Street, Tongyi Road
- D: east side of Chuyun Road, south side of Liangyun Street
