= Xintang station (Hangzhou Metro) =

Metro station in Hangzhou, China

Coordinates: 30°16′42″N 120°12′10″E

Xintang 新塘
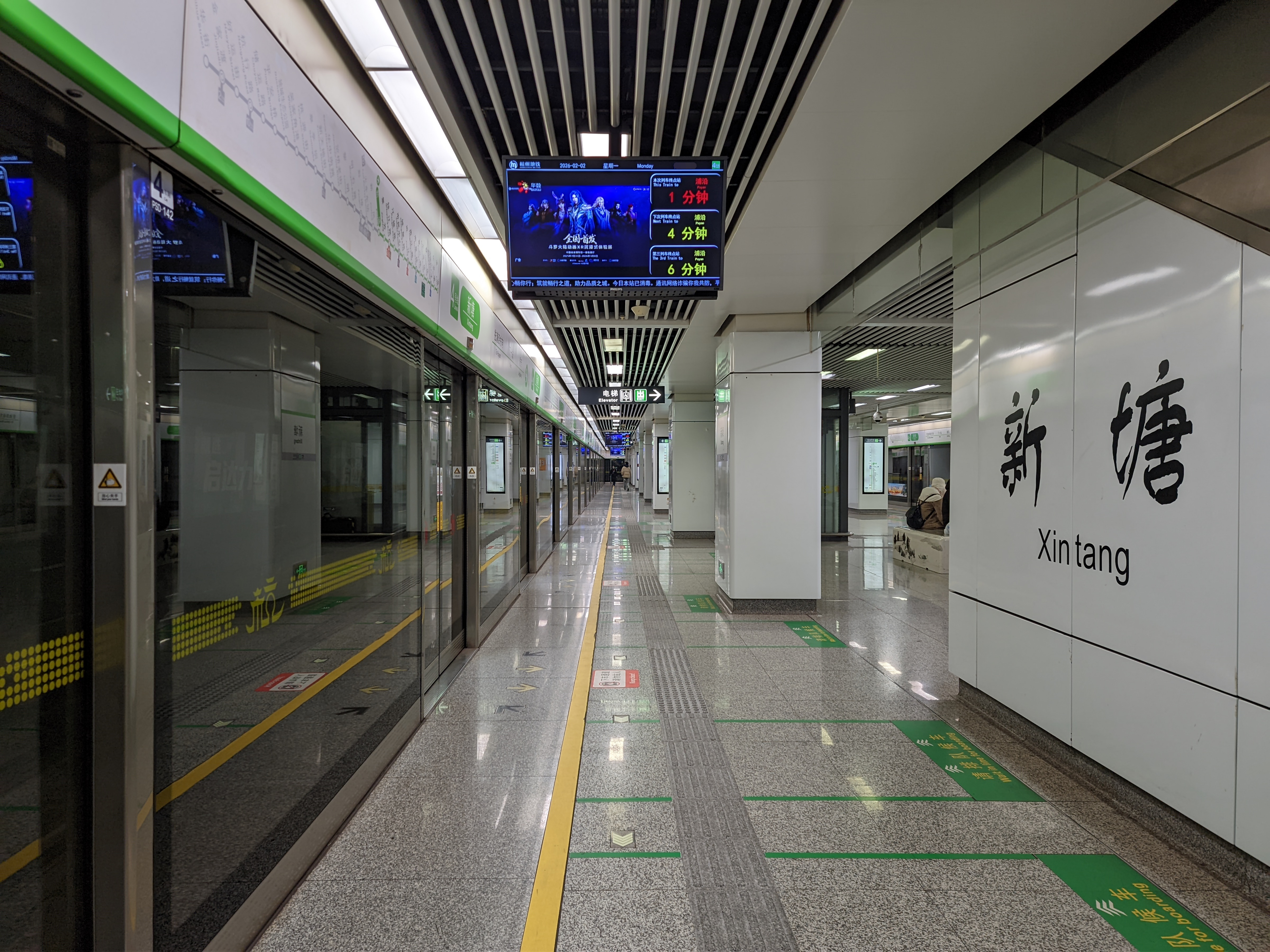
- Platform

General information
- Location: Shangcheng District, Hangzhou, Zhejiang; China
- Operated by: Hangzhou Metro Corporation
- Line: Line 4
- Platforms: 2 (1 island platform)

History
- Opened: June 28, 2015

Services
Preceding station	Hangzhou Metro	Following station
Jingfang towards Puyan	Line 4	Xinfeng towards Chihua Street
Location

Xintang (Chinese: 新塘) is a metro station on Line 4 of the Hangzhou Metro. It is located in the Shangcheng District of Hangzhou. This station was opened on June 28, 2015.
