= Zhejiang Chinese Medical University station =

Metro station in China

Zhejiang Chinese Medical University 中医药大学
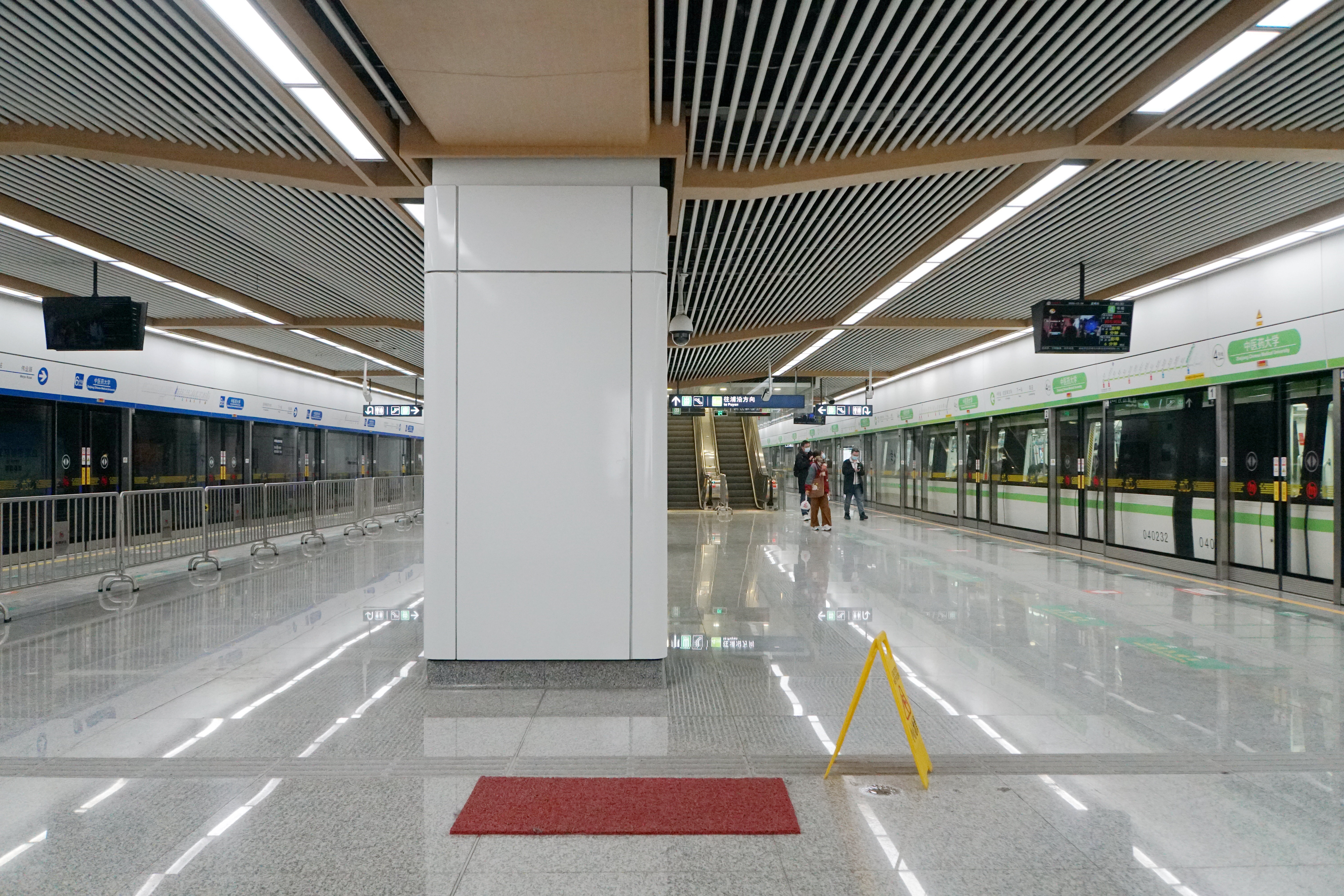
- Platforms of Line 4 toward Chihua Street (right) and Line 6 toward Goujulong (left)

General information
- Location: Puyan Road × Lianjiang Street; Binjiang District, Hangzhou, Zhejiang; China
- Coordinates: 30.177519°N 120.141934°E
- System: Hangzhou metro station
- Operator: Hangzhou Metro Corporation
- Lines: Line 4 Line 6
- Platforms: 4 (2 island platforms)

Construction
- Structure type: Underground
- Accessible: Yes

History
- Opened: 9 January 2018 (Line 4); 30 December 2020 (Line 6)
- Former names: Chinese Medical University station (before January 2020)

Services
Preceding station	Hangzhou Metro	Following station
Yangjiadun towards Puyan	Line 4	Lianzhuang towards Chihua Street
Xipu Road towards West Guihua Road or Shuangpu	Line 6	Weiye Road towards Goujulong
Route map
Location

Zhejiang Chinese Medical University (simplified Chinese: 中医药大学; traditional Chinese: 中醫藥大學), formerly known as Chinese Medical University, is a metro station on Line 4 and Line 6 of the Hangzhou Metro in China. Located in the Binjiang District of Hangzhou, it serves the nearby Zhejiang Chinese Medical University.

== Station layout ==
Zhejiang Chinese Medical University station has three levels: a concourse, and two island platforms in separate levels, each one with two tracks. Line 4 uses the eastern tracks, and Line 6 uses western tracks. A same-direction cross-platform interchange is provided between the two lines. All of two platform levels have toilets, and a nursery room is offered on basement 3.

G	Ground level	Exits
B1	Concourse	Tickets, Customer Service Center, Toilets, Convenient stores
B2		← Line 6 towards West Guihua Road or Shuangpu (Xipu Road)
B2	Island Platform, doors will open on the right for Line 4, left for Line 6
B2		← Line 4 towards Puyan (Yangjiadun)
B3		Line 6 towards Goujulong (Weiye Road) →
B3	Island Platform, doors will open on the left for Line 4, right for Line 6
B3		Line 4 towards Chihua Street (Lianzhuang) →

== Entrances/exits ==
- A: east side of Puyan Road, Dongxin Avenue
- B: west side of Puyan Road, Dongxin Avenue
- C: west side of Puyan Road, Binwen Road
- D: Zhejiang Chinese Medical University

== Gallery ==
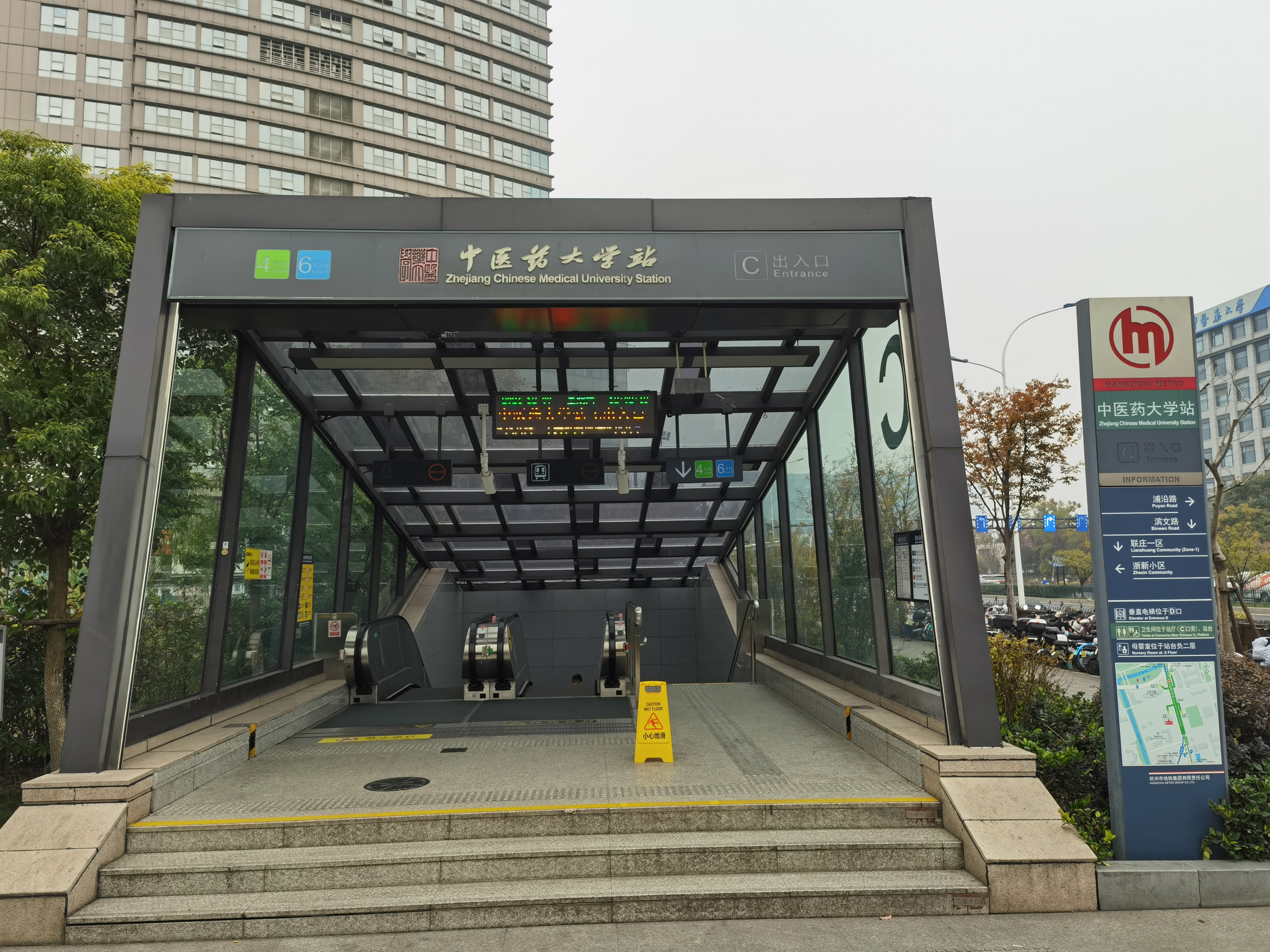
Entrance C

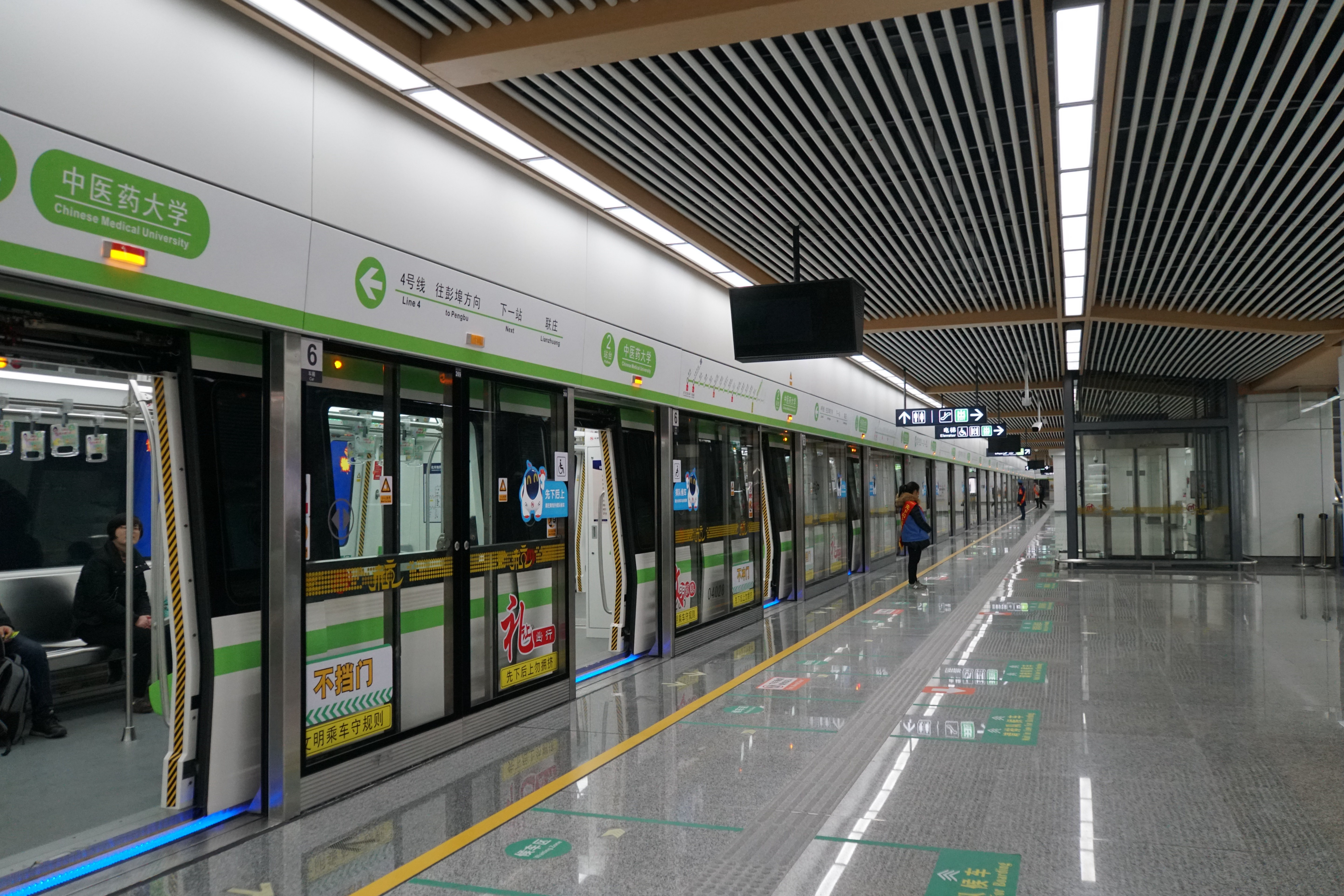
Platform of Line 4

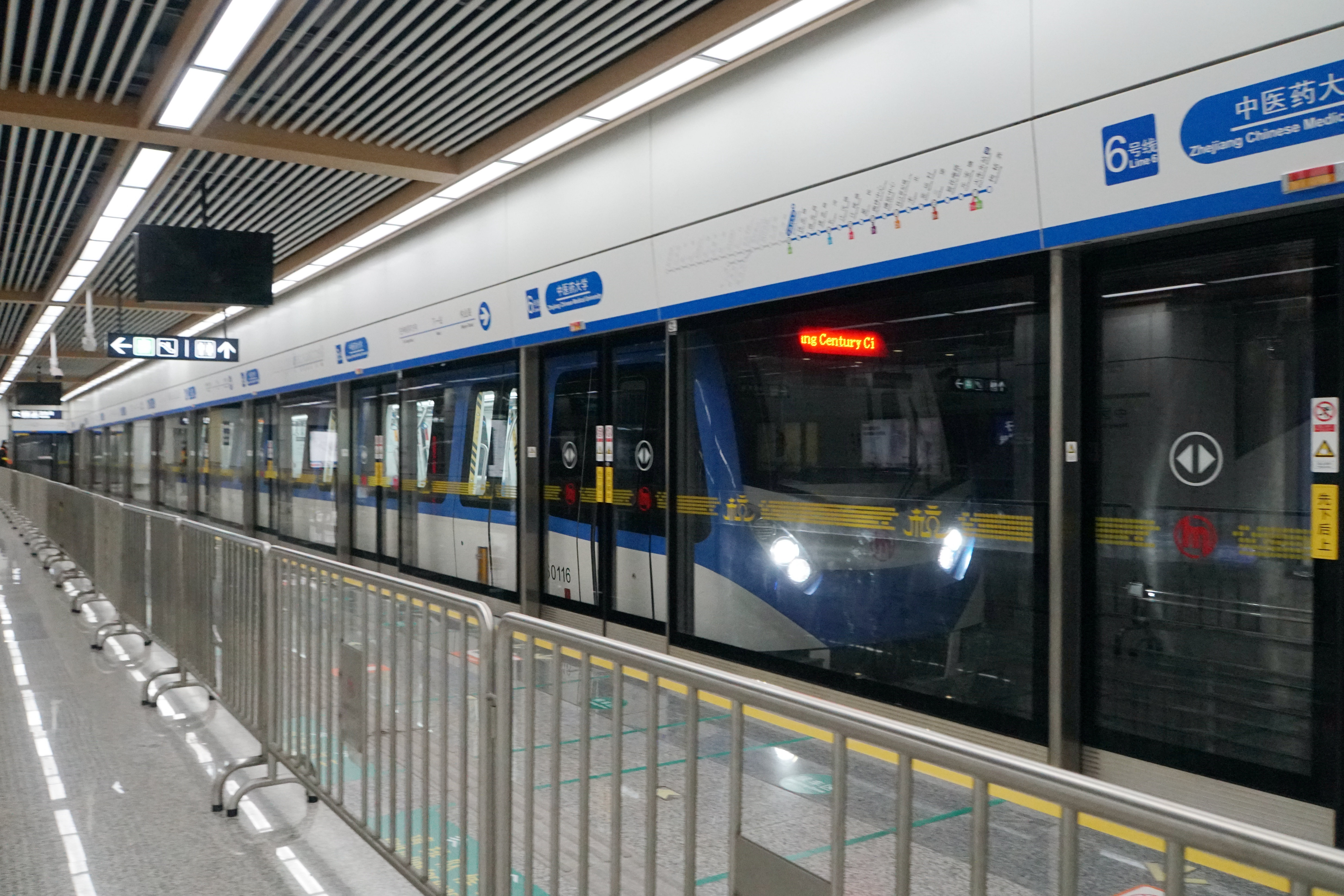
Train of Line 6 entering the station
