= Yangjiadun station =

Metro station in China

Yangjiadun 杨家墩
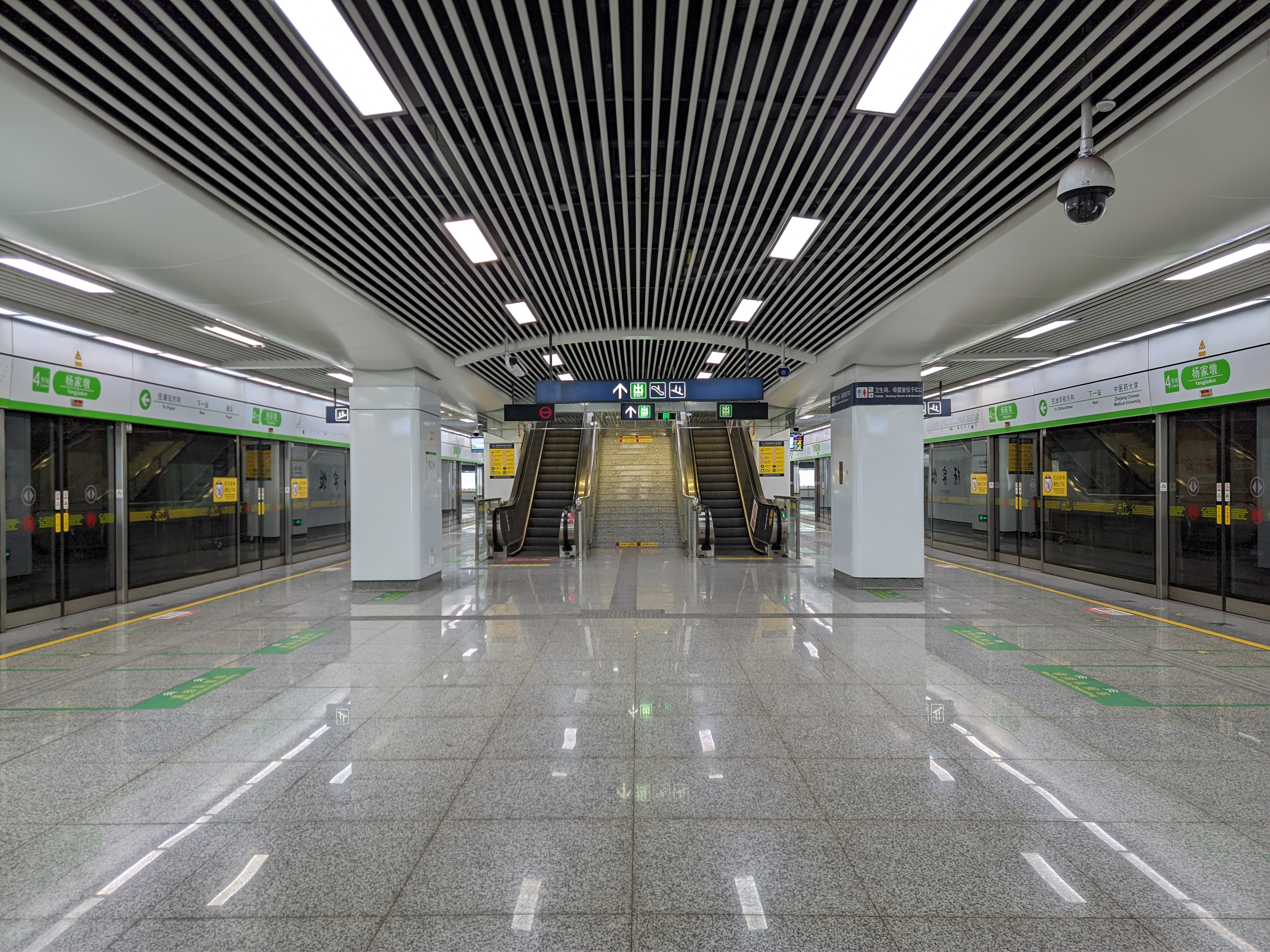

General information
- Location: Binjiang District, Hangzhou, Zhejiang; China
- Operated by: Hangzhou Metro Corporation
- Line: Line 4
- Platforms: 2 (1 island platform)

History
- Opened: January 9, 2018

Services
Preceding station	Hangzhou Metro	Following station
Puyan Terminus	Line 4	Zhejiang Chinese Medical University towards Chihua Street
Location

Yangjiadun (Chinese: 杨家墩) is a metro station on Line 4 of the Hangzhou Metro in China. It is located in the Binjiang District of Hangzhou.
