= Binjiang, Hangzhou =

Binjiang 滨江区
- District
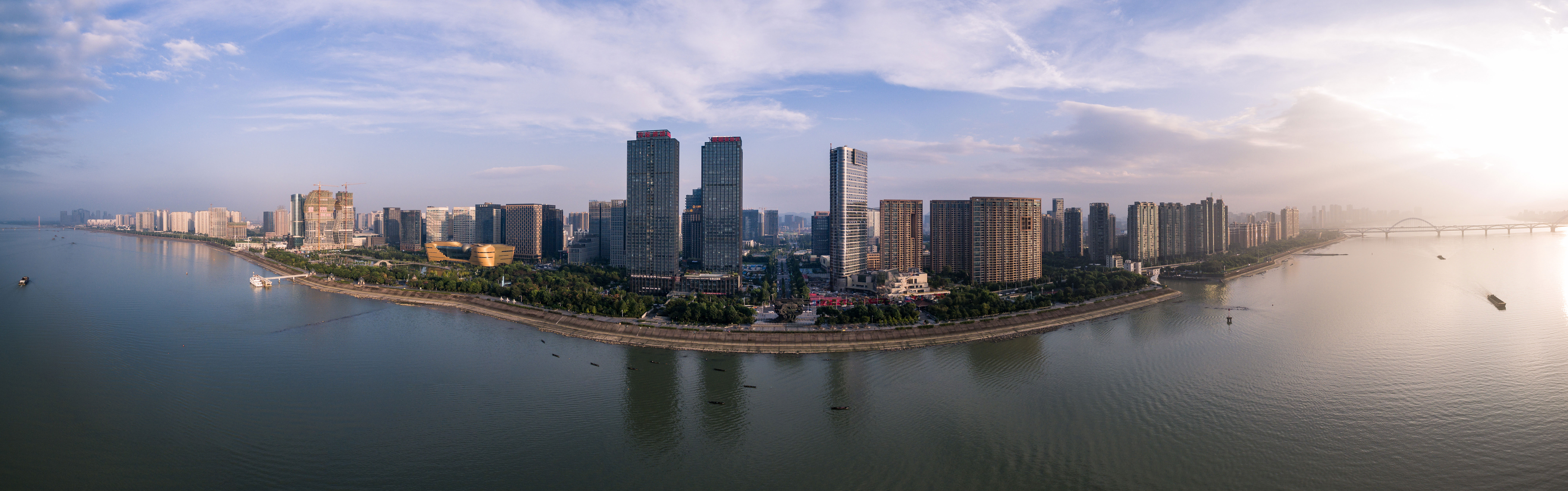
- Binjiang Aerial Panorama

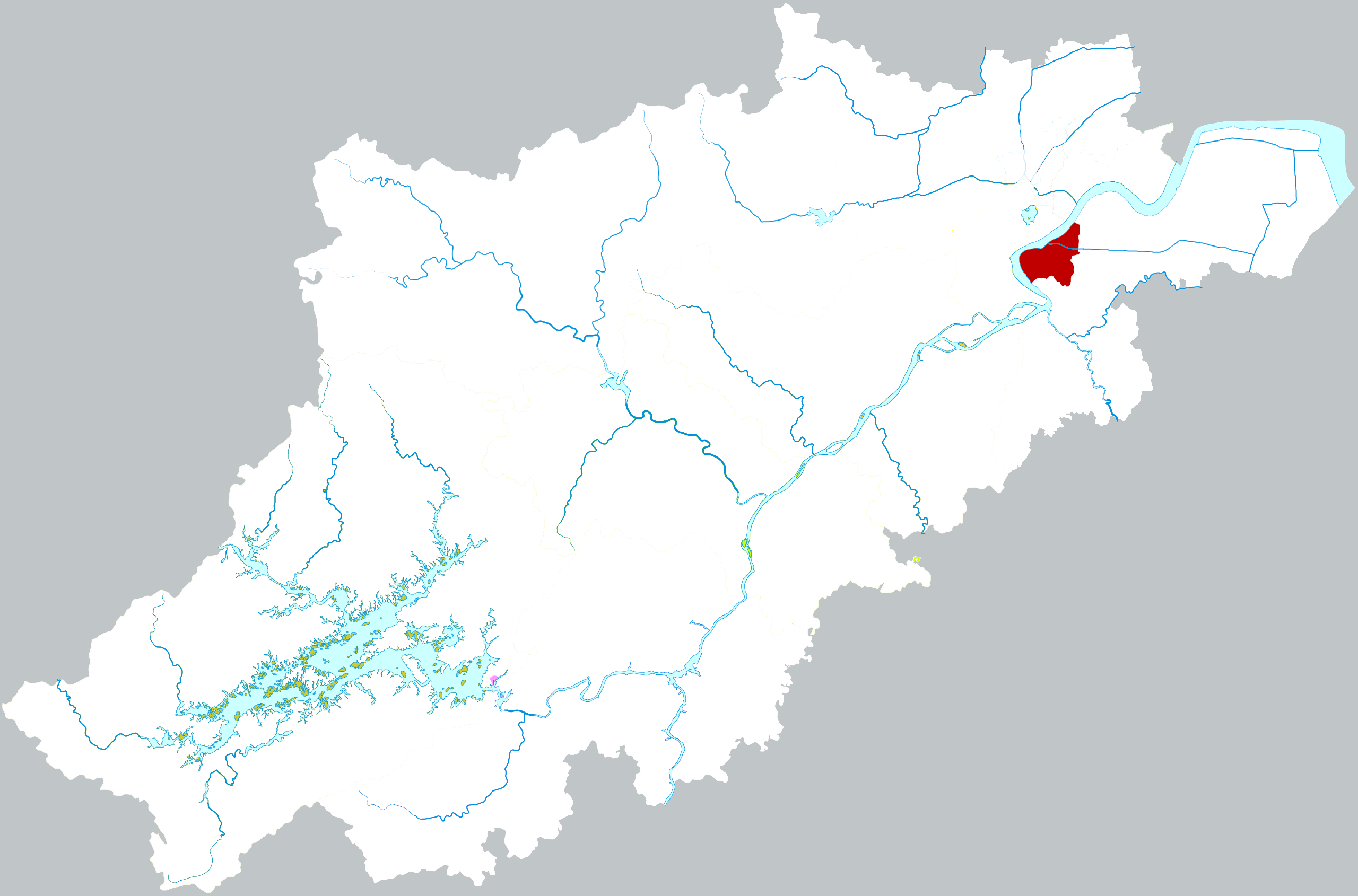
- Location of Binjiang District within Hangzhou

- Location in Zhejiang
- Coordinates: 30.225°N 120.197°E
- Country: People's Republic of China
- Province: Zhejiang
- Prefecture-level city: Hangzhou

Area
  - Total: 72.2 km^{2} (27.9 sq mi)

Population (2020)
  - Total: 503,859
  - Density: 6,980/km^{2} (18,100/sq mi)
- Time zone: UTC+8 (China Standard)
- Postal code: 310051

Binjiang, Hangzhou
- Simplified Chinese: 滨江区
Transcriptions
Standard Mandarin
- Hanyu Pinyin: Bīnjiāng Qū

Binjiang (Chinese: 滨江区) is an urban district of Hangzhou, Zhejiang, China.

The district's total area is 72.2 square kilometres (27.9 mi^{2}), and its permanent population totals 503,859 people as of 2020.

== Toponymy ==
The district's name is derived from its geographic location along the Qiantang River, and literally translates to river bank (simplified Chinese: 滨江区; traditional Chinese: 濱江區; pinyin: Bīnjiāng Qū; lit. 'river bank district').

== History ==
The area of present-day Binjiang District belonged to the ancient Chinese state of Yue. Xixing Old Street (Chinese: 西兴老街; pinyin: Xīxìng Lǎo Jiē), a neighborhood within Xixing Subdistrict, has been continuously inhabited since the Spring and Autumn period. Xixing was established by Yue statesman Fan Li.

The area fell under the jurisdiction of Xiaoshan County, the subdivisions of which are known as far back as the Tang dynasty.

Present-day Binjiang District lies along the ancient Grand Canal, which made the area central to the movement of goods and people from north China to south China. The area was a major point for the export of goods abroad.

During the Tang dynasty, the ancient town of Xixing was a major center for poetry.

During the Japanese invasion of China, most townships in Xiaoshan County were occupied or semi-occupied by the Japanese army.

In 1947, Heshang District (Chinese: 河上区; pinyin: Héshàng Qū) was established within Xiaoshan County as a county-controlled district.

The area came under control of the People's Republic of China in May 1949.

In September 1958, people's communes were established throughout nearly all of Xiaoshan County. They remained commonplace in Xiaoshan County until their abolition in May 1984.

Xiaoshan County was changed to a county-level city on November 27, 1987, and administered the three towns of Xixing, Changhe, and Puyan.

On May 8, 1996, Xiaoshan was merged into nearby Xihu District.

On December 12, 1996, Binjiang District was created, with the three towns which formerly belonged to Xiaoshan.

The district's three towns were upgraded to subdistricts on December 3, 2003.

In August 2015, Binjiang District was approved as China's tenth National Independent Innovation Demonstration Zone.

== Geography ==
Binjiang District is bordered by Xiaoshan District to its east and south, and by the Qiantang River to its north and west. Across the Qiantang River lies Jianggan District, Shangcheng District, and Xihu District.

== Administrative divisions ==
Binjiang District has jurisdiction over three subdistricts: Xixing Subdistrict, Changhe Subdistrict, and Puyan Subdistrict. These subdistricts are then further divided into 53 residential communities.

== Demographics ==
As of 2020, 192,265 people (38.16% of its total population) live in Puyan Subdistrict, 168,276 (33.40%) live in Changhe Subdistrict, and 143,318 (28.44%) live in Xixing Subdistrict.

== Economy ==
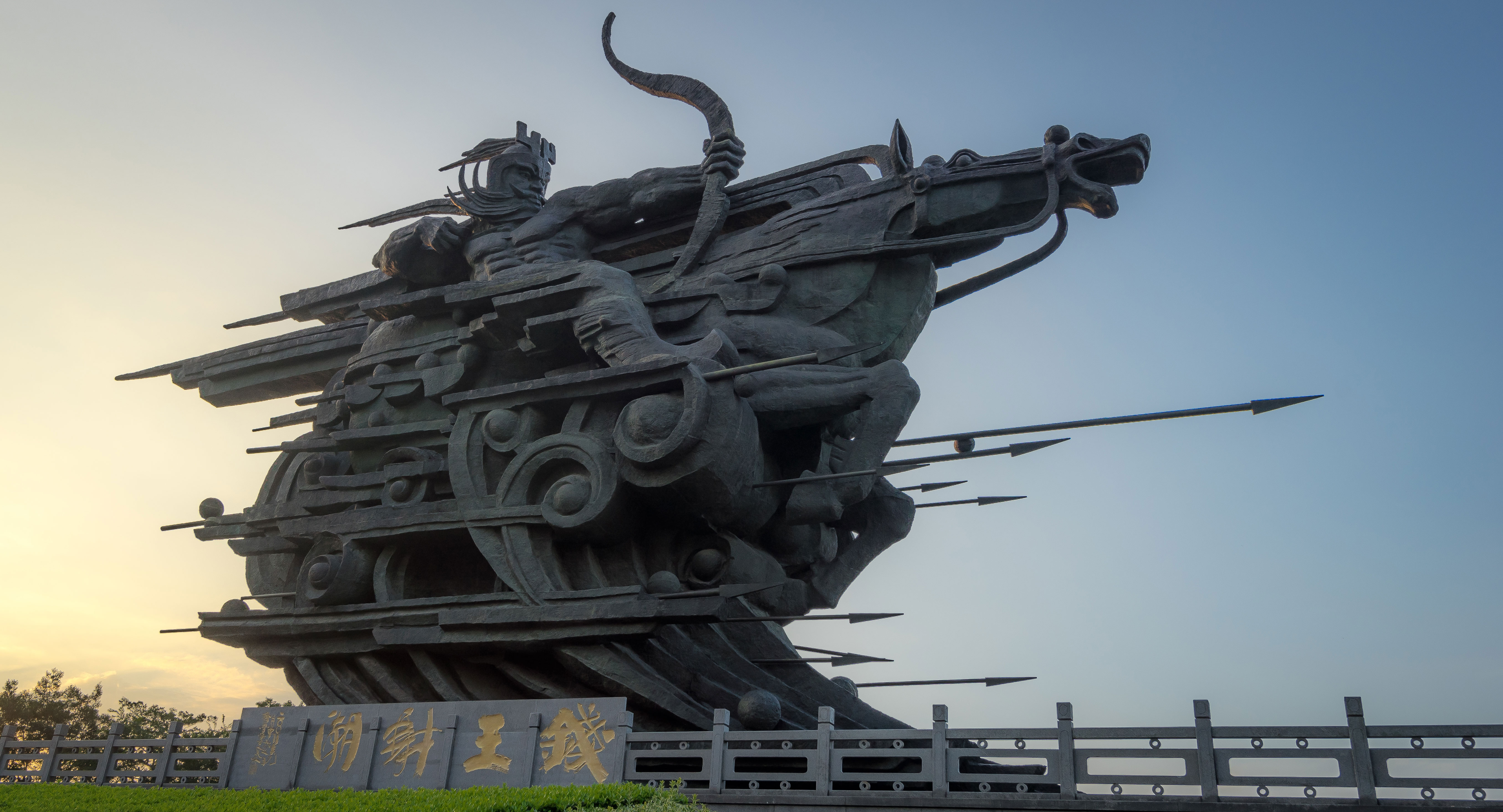
King Qian Shooting the Tidal Wave

As of 2020, Binjiang District's gross domestic product (GDP) totals 174.57 billion renminbi (RMB), and posted a growth rate of 7.2%. In 2019, Binjiang District's GDP totaled ¥159.22 billion, and grew at a rate of 8.2%.

In 2020, Binjiang District's primary sector accounted for just 0.03% of its GDP, while its secondary sector accounted for 46.34% of it, and its tertiary sector was responsible for 53.62% of it.

Binjiang District is a major corporate center within China, and some of the country's largest private enterprises have headquarters or major offices in the district. Geely, a major automotive manufacturing company which was the 10th largest private enterprise in China as of 2020, has its headquarters in the district. Other large companies headquartered in Binjiang District include video surveillance company Dahua Technology, appliance company Supor, and logistics company BEST. Other major firms with a presence in Binjiang District include Alibaba, NetEase, H3C, Hikvision, Uniview, CHINT Group (Chinese: 正泰太阳能), Supcon (Chinese: 浙江中控), and Focused Photonics (Chinese: 聚光科技).

== Culture ==
During the Tang dynasty, the ancient town of Xixing (Chinese: 西兴; pinyin: Xīxìng), located within present-day Xixing Subdistrict and then known as Xiling (Chinese: 西陵; pinyin: Xīlíng), was a major center for Tang poetry. Xixing was the subject of a poem by Bai Juyi.

== Transportation ==
=== Metro ===
Binjiang District is served by five lines on the Hangzhou Metro: Line 1, Line 4, Line 5, Line 6, and Line 7. In the future, Line 18 will also going through Binjiang District.

- Line 1: Binkang Road, Xixing, Binhe Road, Jiangling Road
- Line 4: Puyan, Yangjiadun, Zhejiang Chinese Medical University, Lianzhuang
- Line 5: Changhe, Jucai Road, Jianghui Road, Binkang Road
- Line 6: Xipu Road, Zhejiang Chinese Medical University, Weiye Road, Chengye Road, Jianye Road, Changhe, Jianghan Road, Jiangling Road, Xingmin, Olympic Sports Center
- Line 7: Olympic Sports Center

=== Road ===
- Shidai Avenue
- S4 Airport Expressway
- Zhonghe Elevated Bridge
- Guanshan Tunnel
