= Weiye Road station =

Metro station in China

Weiye Road 伟业路
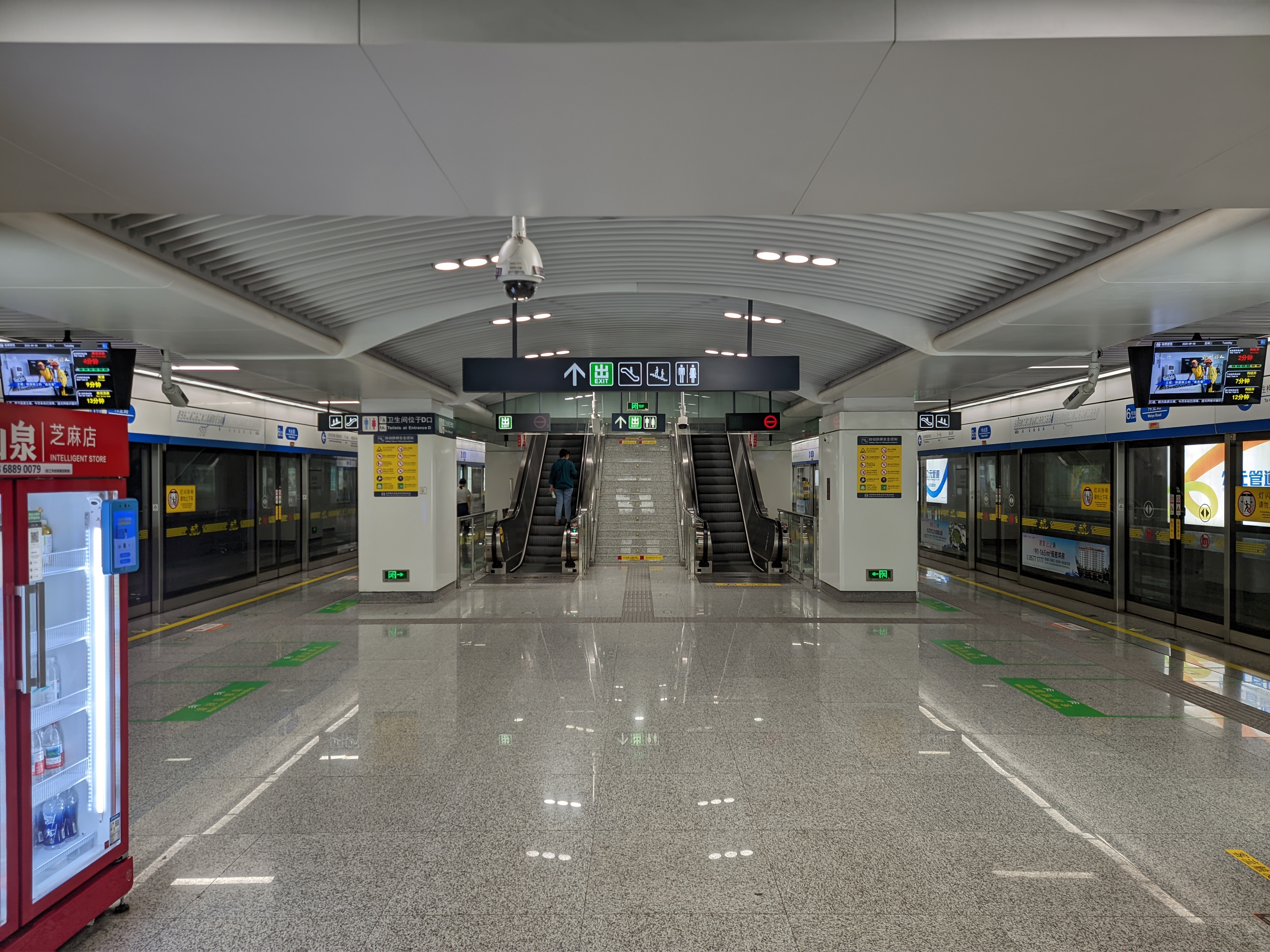
- Platforms

General information
- Location: Jiangnan Avenue × Weiye Road; Binjiang District, Hangzhou, Zhejiang; China
- Coordinates: 30°11′05″N 120°09′16″E
- System: Hangzhou metro station
- Operator: Hangzhou Metro Corporation
- Line: Line 6
- Platforms: 2 (1 island platform)
- Tracks: 2

Construction
- Structure type: Underground
- Accessible: Yes

History
- Opened: 30 December 2020

Services
Preceding station	Hangzhou Metro	Following station
Zhejiang Chinese Medical University towards West Guihua Road or Shuangpu	Line 6	Chengye Road towards Goujulong
Location

Weiye Road (simplified Chinese: 伟业路; traditional Chinese: 偉業路) is a metro station on Line 6 of the Hangzhou Metro in China. The station opened on 30 December 2020, along with other stations completed in Phase 1 of Line 6. It is located in the Binjiang District of Hangzhou, capital city of Zhejiang province.

== Station layout ==
Weiye Road has two levels: a concourse, and an island platform with two tracks for line 6.

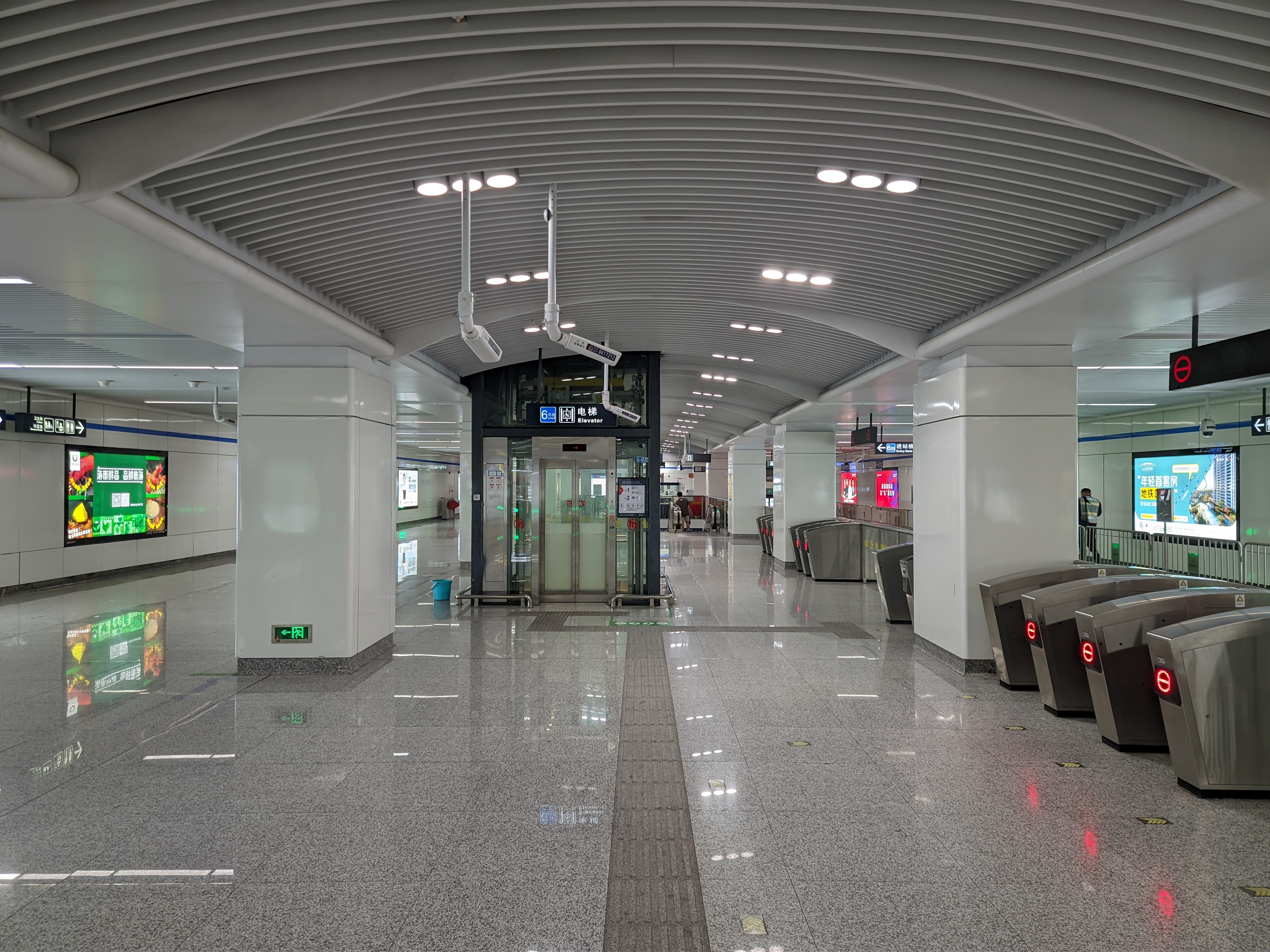
Concourse

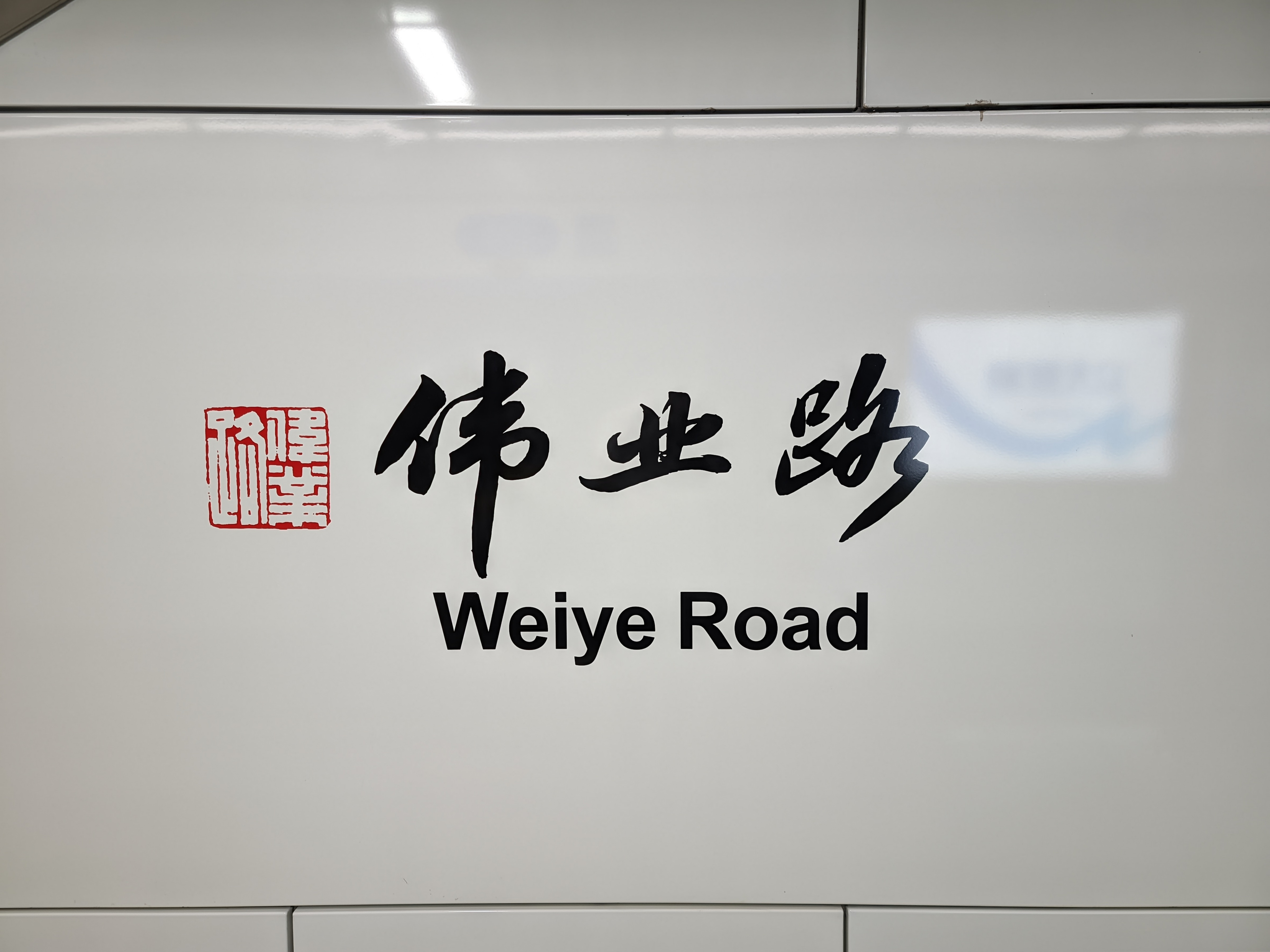
Station name in Chinese calligraphy

== Entrances/exits ==
- A: Binjiang Convention and Exhibition Center
- B: north side of Jiangnan Avenue, west side of Weiye Road
- C: south side of Jiangnan Avenue, west side of Weiye Road
- D: south side of Jiangnan Avenue, east side of Weiye Road
