= Line 4 (Hangzhou Metro) =

Metro line of the Hangzhou Metro system in China

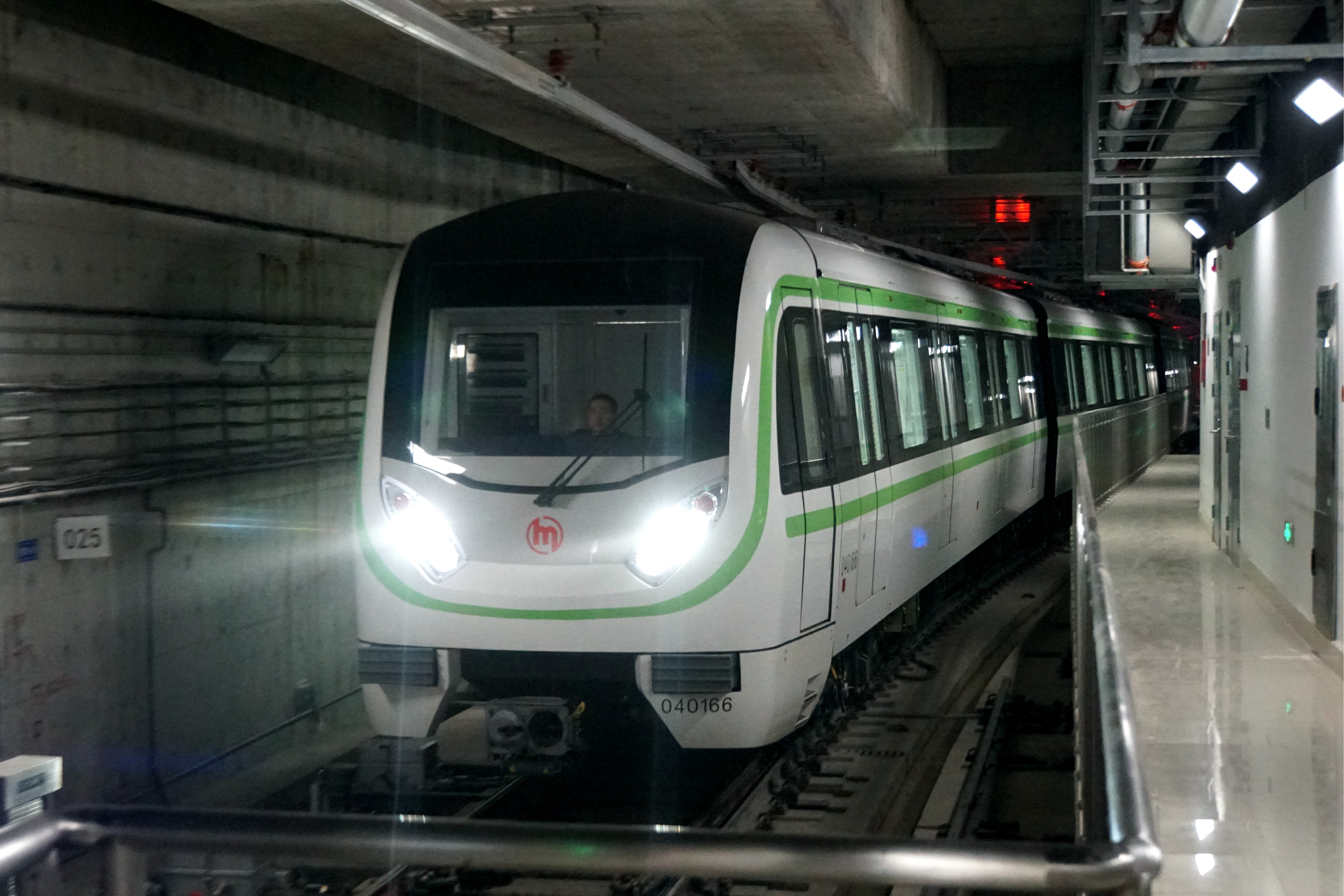
- A train of Hangzhou Metro Line 4

Overview
- Status: Operational
- Owner: City of Hangzhou
- Locale: Hangzhou, Zhejiang, China
- Termini: Chihua Street; Puyan
- Stations: 33 (32 in operation)

Service
- Type: Rapid transit
- System: Hangzhou Metro
- Operator(s): Hangzhou Metro Corporation
- Depot(s): Qibao Stabling Yard; Gouzhuang Depot
- Rolling stock: PM082; PM174
- Daily ridership: 422,800 (2019 Peak)

History
- Opened: 2 February 2015; 11 years ago

Technical
- Line length: 46.85 km (29.11 mi)
- Number of tracks: 2
- Character: Underground
- Track gauge: 1,435 mm (4 ft 8 1/2 in)
- Electrification: Overhead line, 1500 V DC
- Operating speed: 80 km/h (50 mph)

Line 4 of the Hangzhou Metro (Chinese: 杭州地铁四号线; pinyin: Hángzhōu Dìtiě Sìhào Xiàn) is a rapid transit line in Hangzhou. It is colored green on maps.

== Description ==
=== Phase 1 ===
Phase 1 of the line started operation since 2015. Running northeast–southwest, the line connects Hangzhou East railway station, Qianjiang New City and Binjiang District. Part of the line (Qianjiang Road to Shuicheng Bridge) runs along the north bank of Qiantang River.

=== Phase 2 ===
The second phase of Line 4 is 26 km in length. This extension was opened on 21 February 2022.

== Opening timeline ==
Segment	Commencement	Length	Station(s)	Name
Pengbu — Jinjiang	2 February 2015	9.6 km (6.0 mi)	9	Phase 1 (initial section)
Xintang	28 June 2015	Infill station	1	
Jinjiang — Puyan	9 January 2018	11.2 km (7.0 mi)	7	Phase 1 (final section)
Lianzhuang	6 June 2018	Infill station	1	
Pengbu — Chihua Street	21 February 2022	26 km (16 mi)	14	Phase 2 (exclude Ducheng Ecopark Station)
Ducheng Ecopark	26 July 2025	Infill station	1	

== Stations ==
Legend

- Operational
- Under construction

Section	Station name		Connections	Distance km		Location
Section	English	Chinese	Connections	Distance km		Location
Phase 3 south ext.	Wenyan	闻堰	18	-		Xiaoshan
Phase 3 south ext.	Middle Wanda Road	万达中路		1.020		Xiaoshan
Phase 3 south ext.	North Wanda Road	万达北路		1.638		Xiaoshan
Phase 3 south ext.	Puju Street	浦炬街		0.939		Binjiang
Phase 1	Puyan	浦沿		1.357		Binjiang
Phase 1	Yangjiadun	杨家墩				Binjiang
Phase 1	Zhejiang Chinese Medical University	中医药大学	6			Binjiang
Phase 1	Lianzhuang	联庄				Binjiang
Phase 1	Shuicheng Bridge	水澄桥				Shangcheng
Phase 1	Fuxing Road	复兴路				Shangcheng
Phase 1	Nanxingqiao	南星桥	5			Shangcheng
Phase 1	Yongjiang Road	甬江路	18			Shangcheng
Phase 1	Jinjiang	近江	1			Shangcheng
Phase 1	Chengxing Road	城星路				Shangcheng
Phase 1	Citizen Center	市民中心	7			Shangcheng
Phase 1	Jiangjin Road	江锦路				Shangcheng
Phase 1	Qianjiang Road	钱江路	2 9			Shangcheng
Phase 1	Jingfang	景芳	15			Shangcheng
Phase 1	Xintang	新塘				Shangcheng
Phase 1	Xinfeng	新风				Shangcheng
Phase 1	East Railway Station	火车东站	1 6 (Note: Out-of-station interchange with East Railway Station (East Square)) 19; HGH			Shangcheng
Phase 1	Pengbu	彭埠	1			Shangcheng
Phase 2	Mingshi Road	明石路			24.420	Shangcheng
Phase 2	Liming	黎明		1.346		Shangcheng
Phase 2	Jianqiao Old Street	笕桥老街		1.173	28.939	Shangcheng
Phase 2	South Huazhong Road	华中南路		1.713	28.652	Gongshu
Phase 2	Xintiandi Street	新天地街	3	2.156	30.808	Gongshu
Phase 2	Gaotingba	皋亭坝		1.750	32.558	Gongshu
Phase 2	Taoyuan Street	桃源街		1.465	34.023	Gongshu
Phase 2	Wujiajiaogang	吴家角港		1.326		Gongshu
Phase 2	Ducheng Ecopark	独城生态公园		1.850		Gongshu
Phase 2	Ping'an Bridge	平安桥	15	1.390	38.590	Gongshu
Phase 2	Chuyun Road	储运路		1.309	39.900	Yuhang
Phase 2	Hangxing Road	杭行路	10	1.333	41.230	Yuhang
Phase 2	Haoyun Street	好运街		1.574	42.812	Yuhang
Phase 2	Jinjiadu	金家渡	2	2.187	44.999	Yuhang
Phase 2	Chihua Street	池华街		1.746	46.745	Xihu
Phase 3 west ext.	Lianchi Road	莲池路		1.742		Xihu
Phase 3 west ext.	East Westlake University	西湖大学东		1.160		Xihu
Phase 3 west ext.	Westlake University	西湖大学		1.265		Xihu
Phase 3 west ext.	Yungu	云谷		0.954		Xihu

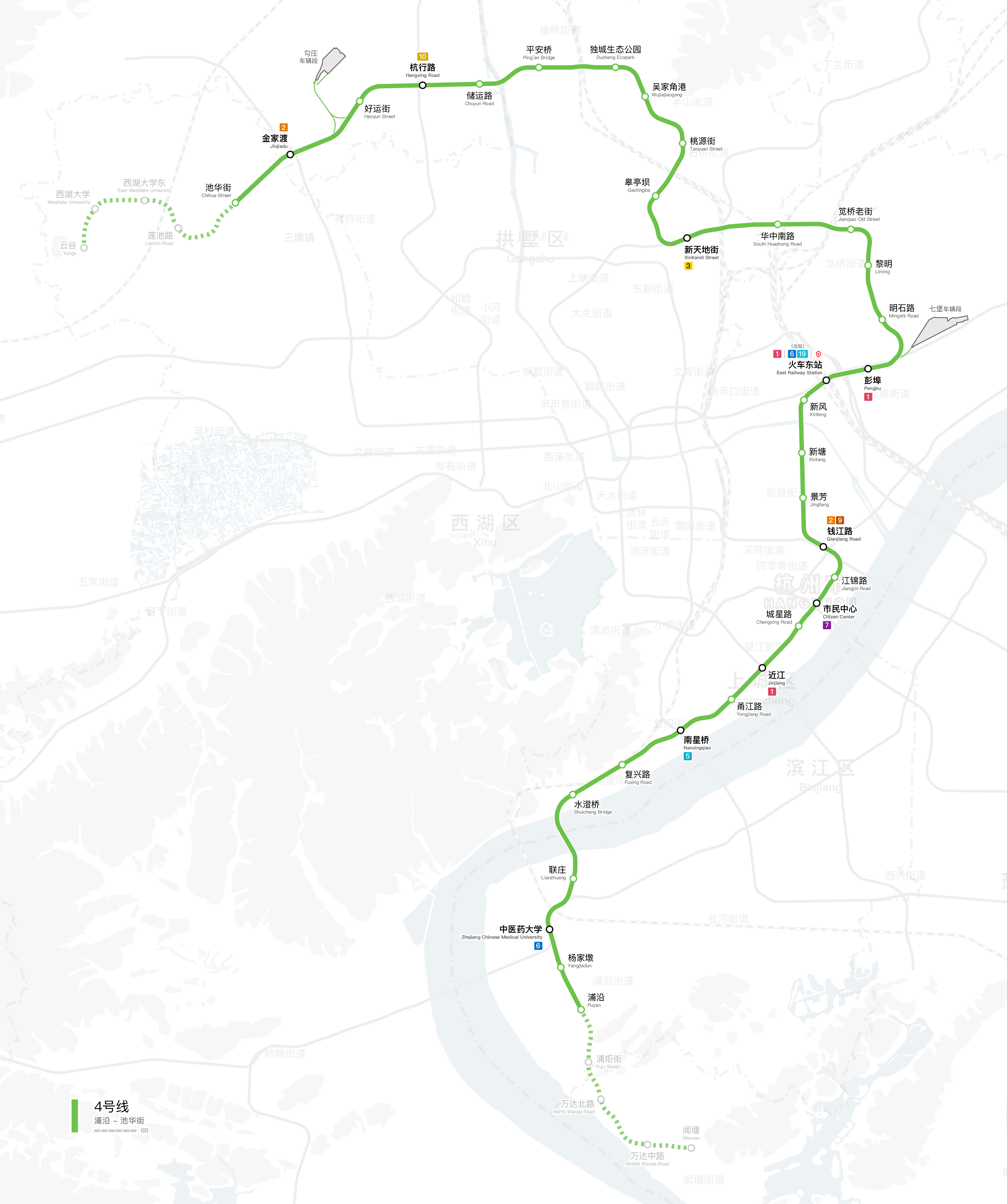
To scale map of Hangzhou Metro Line 4

== Rolling stock ==
Stock	Class	Year built	Builder	Number built	Numbers	Formation	Depots	Line assigned	Notes
PM082	B	2013-2015	CSR Nanjing Puzhen	174 (29 sets)	04 001 - 04 029 (040011-040296)	Tc+Mp+M+M+Mp+Tc	Gouzhuang Yard; Qibao Depot	4	
PM174	B	2020-2022	CRRC Nanjing Puzhen	192 (32 sets)	04 030 - 04 061 (040301-040616)	Tc+Mp+M+M+Mp+Tc	Gouzhuang Yard; Qibao Depot	4	

== See also ==
- Hangzhou Metro
