= Puyan station =

Metro station in Hangzhou, China

Puyan 浦沿
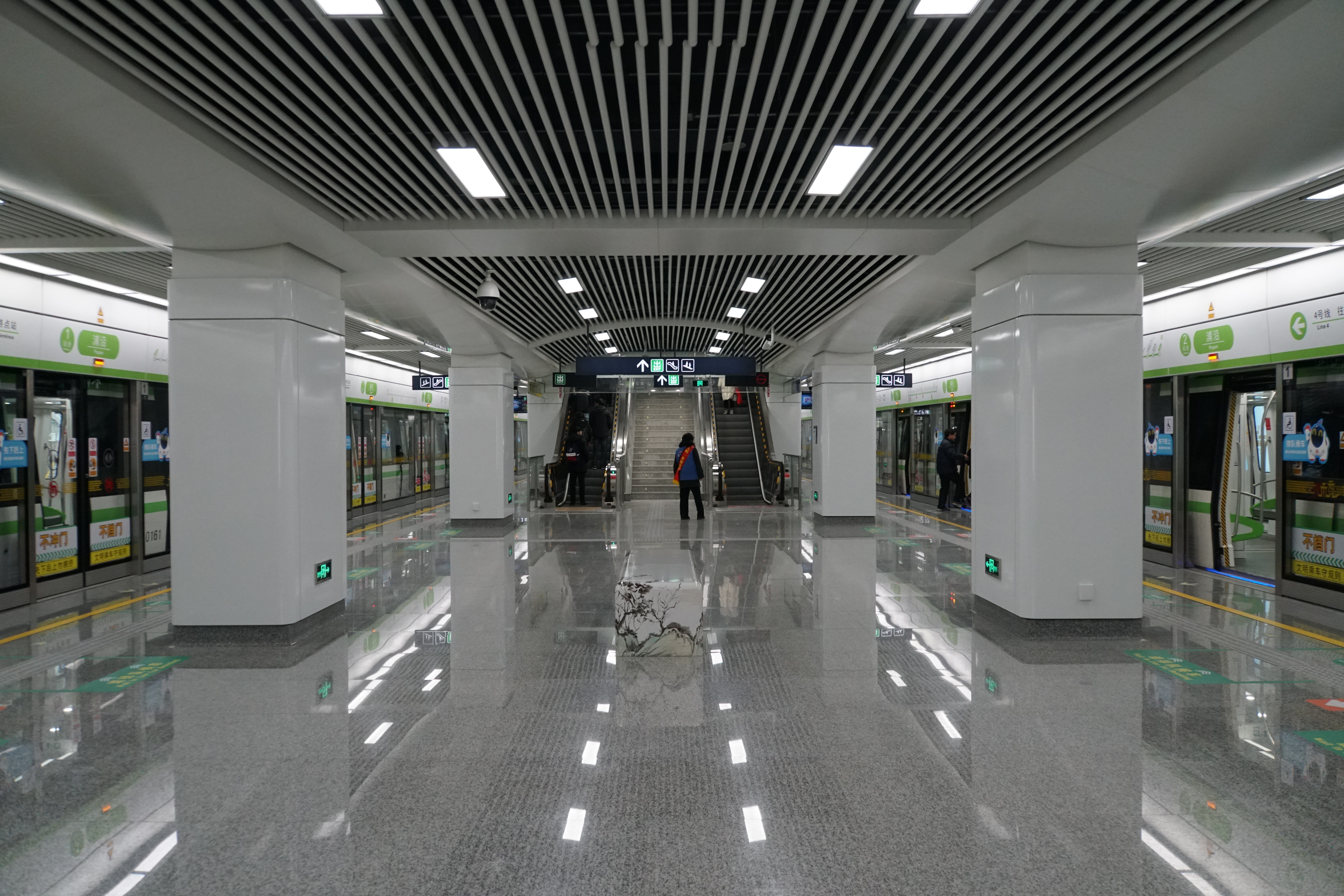

General information
- Location: Puyan Road × Dongguan Road; Binjiang District, Hangzhou, Zhejiang; China
- Coordinates: 30°09′40″N 120°08′56″E
- System: Hangzhou metro station
- Operator: Hangzhou Metro Corporation
- Line: Line 4
- Platforms: 2 (1 island platform)

Construction
- Structure type: Underground
- Accessible: Yes

History
- Opened: January 9, 2018

Services
| Preceding station | Hangzhou Metro | Following station |
|---|---|---|
| Terminus | Line 4 | Yangjiadun towards Chihua Street |
Location

Puyan (Chinese: 浦沿) is a metro station on Line 4 of the Hangzhou Metro in China. It is located in the Binjiang District of Hangzhou and it is the southern terminus of Line 4.

== Station layout ==
Puyan has two levels: a concourse, and an island platform with two tracks for line 4.

== Entrances/exits ==
- A: east side of Puyan Road, Dongguan Road
- C: west side of Puyan Road, Dongguan Road
- D1: Jinsheng Mancheng community
- D2: Carpark, Puyan metro station
- E: Jinsheng Mancheng community
