= Chihua Street station =

Metro station in Hangzhou, China

Chihua Street 池华街
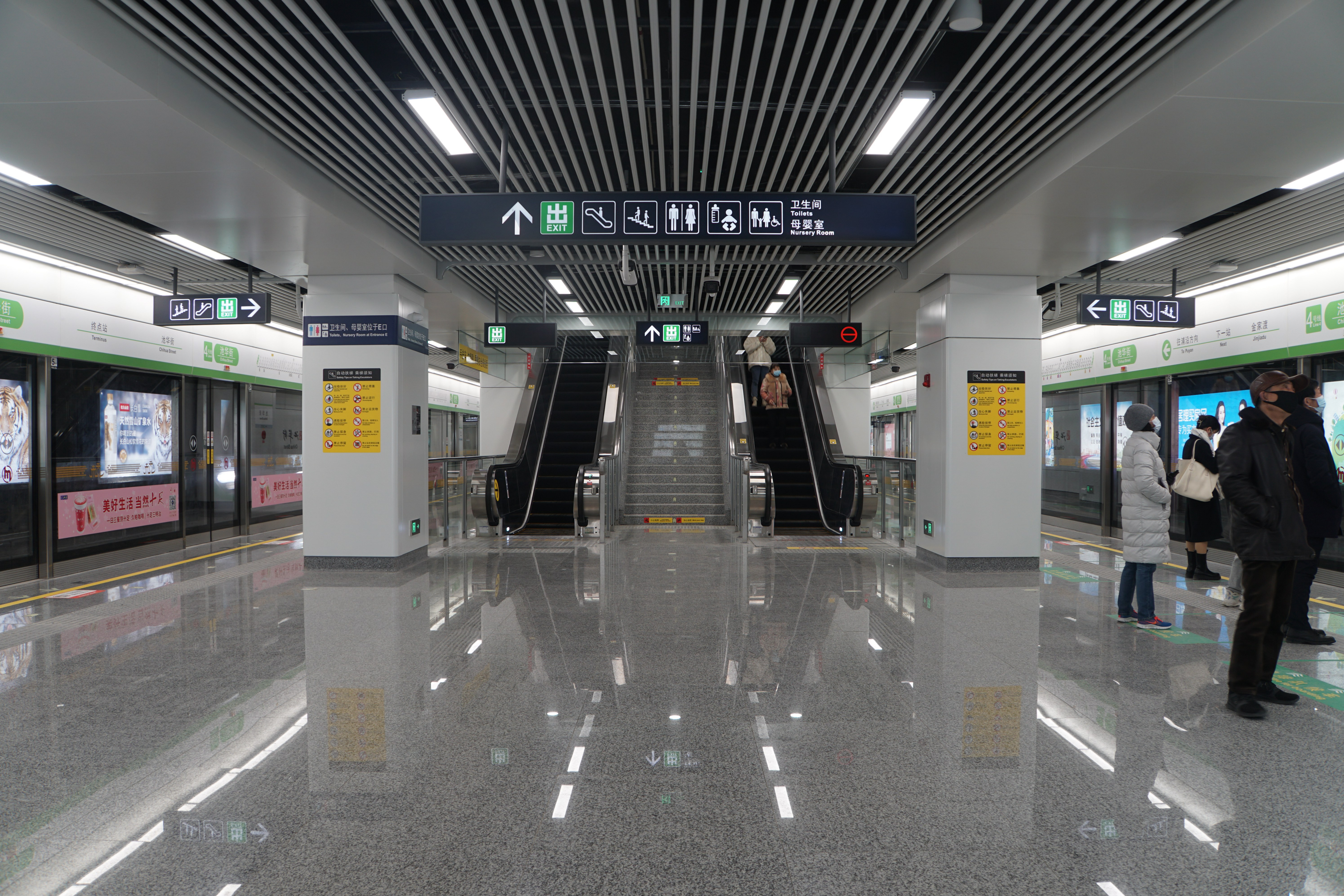
- Platform

General information
- Location: Zixuan Road × Chihua Street; Sandun Town, Xihu District, Hangzhou, Zhejiang; China
- Coordinates: 30°19′49″N 120°3′51″E
- System: Hangzhou metro station
- Operator: Hangzhou Metro Corporation
- Line: Line 4
- Platforms: 2 (1 island platform)
- Tracks: 2

Construction
- Structure type: Underground
- Accessible: Yes

History
- Opened: 21 February 2022; 4 years ago

Services
Preceding station	Hangzhou Metro	Following station
Jinjiadu towards Puyan	Line 4	Terminus
Location

Chihua Street (simplified Chinese: 池华街; traditional Chinese: 池華街) is the western terminus of Line 4 of the Hangzhou Metro in China. It is located in the Xihu District of Hangzhou. It was opened on 21 February 2022.

== Station layout ==
Chihua Street has two levels: a concourse, and an island platform with two tracks for line 4.

== Entrances/exits ==
- A: south side of Chihua Street, east side of Zixuan Road
- B: north side of Chihua Street, east side of Zixuan Road
- C: Fengsheng Nineroya Seal Community
- D1a & D1b: Zijin Dream Plaza
- D2a & D2b: Zijun Xiyuan Community (North Zone)
- D3: north side of Chihua Street
- E: south side of Chihua Street, west side of Zixuan Road
