= Cuibai Road station =

Metro station in Hangzhou, China

Cuibai Road 翠柏路
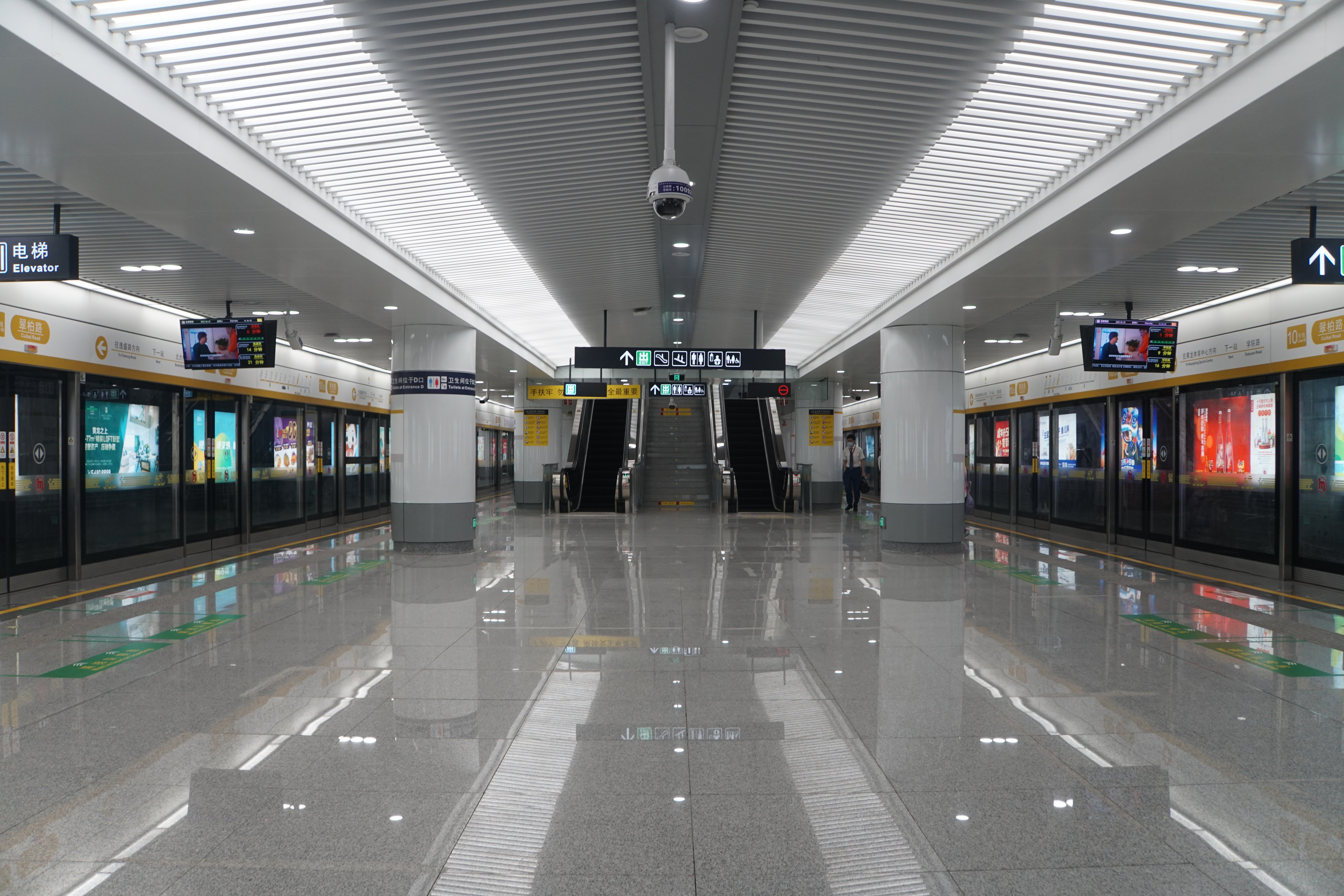
- platform

General information
- Location: Xihu District, Hangzhou, Zhejiang; China
- Coordinates: 30.2921°N 120.12415°E
- Operated by: Hangzhou Metro Corporation
- Line: Line 10
- Platforms: 2 (1 island platform)

History
- Opened: 21 February 2022

Services
Preceding station	Hangzhou Metro	Following station
Xueyuan Road towards Huanglong Sports Center	Line 10	Beida Bridge towards Yisheng Road
Location

Cuibai Road (Chinese: 翠柏路) is a metro station of Line 10 of the Hangzhou Metro in China. It is located in Xihu District of Hangzhou. The station was opened on 21 February 2022.
