= Xueyuan Road station (Hangzhou Metro) =

Metro station in Hangzhou, China

Xueyuan Road 学院路
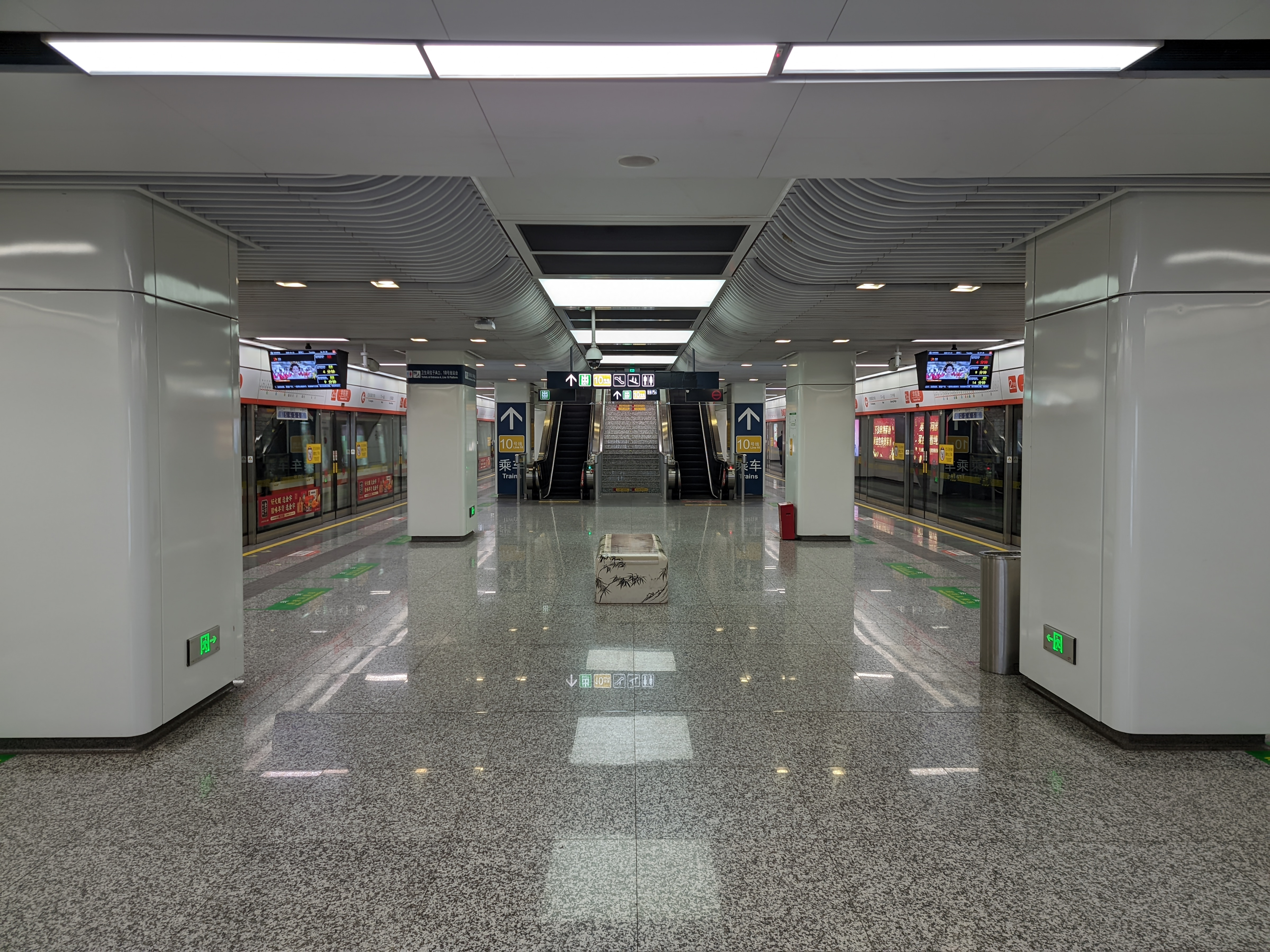
- Platform of Line 2

General information
- Location: Wen'er Road × Xueyuan Road; Xihu District, Hangzhou, Zhejiang; China
- Coordinates: 30.284999°N 120.124948°E
- System: Hangzhou metro station
- Operator: Hangzhou Metro Corporation
- Lines: Line 2 Line 10
- Platforms: 4 (2 island platforms)

Construction
- Structure type: Underground
- Accessible: Yes

History
- Opened: July 3, 2017 (Line 2); June 24, 2022 (Line 10)

Services
Preceding station	Hangzhou Metro	Following station
Xianing Bridge towards Chaoyang	Line 2	Gucui Road towards Liangzhu
Wensan Road towards Huanglong Sports Center	Line 10	Cuibai Road towards Yisheng Road
Route map
Location

Xueyuan Road (simplified Chinese: 学院路; traditional Chinese: 學院路) is a metro station on Line 2 and Line 10 of the Hangzhou Metro in China. It is located in the Xihu District of Hangzhou.

== Station layout ==
Xueyuan Road has three levels: a concourse, and separate levels for lines 2 and 10. Basement 2 is for line 2, and basement 3 is for line 10. Each of these consists of an island platform with two tracks.

== Entrances/exits ==
There are 7 exits. The exit D & E before Line 10 opened called B & C. Exits A/D–F connect Line 2, exits B/C connect Line 10. But the exit F belong to Line 10 project.

- A: north side of Wen'er Road, east side of Xueyuan Road
- B1 & B2: east side of Xueyuan Road, Xingzhi Alley
- C: Cuiyuan Community (Zone 1)
- D: north side of Wen'er Road, west side of Xueyuan Road
- E: Fenghua Fudi Community
- F: south side of Wen'er Road, east side of Xueyuan Road

== Gallery ==
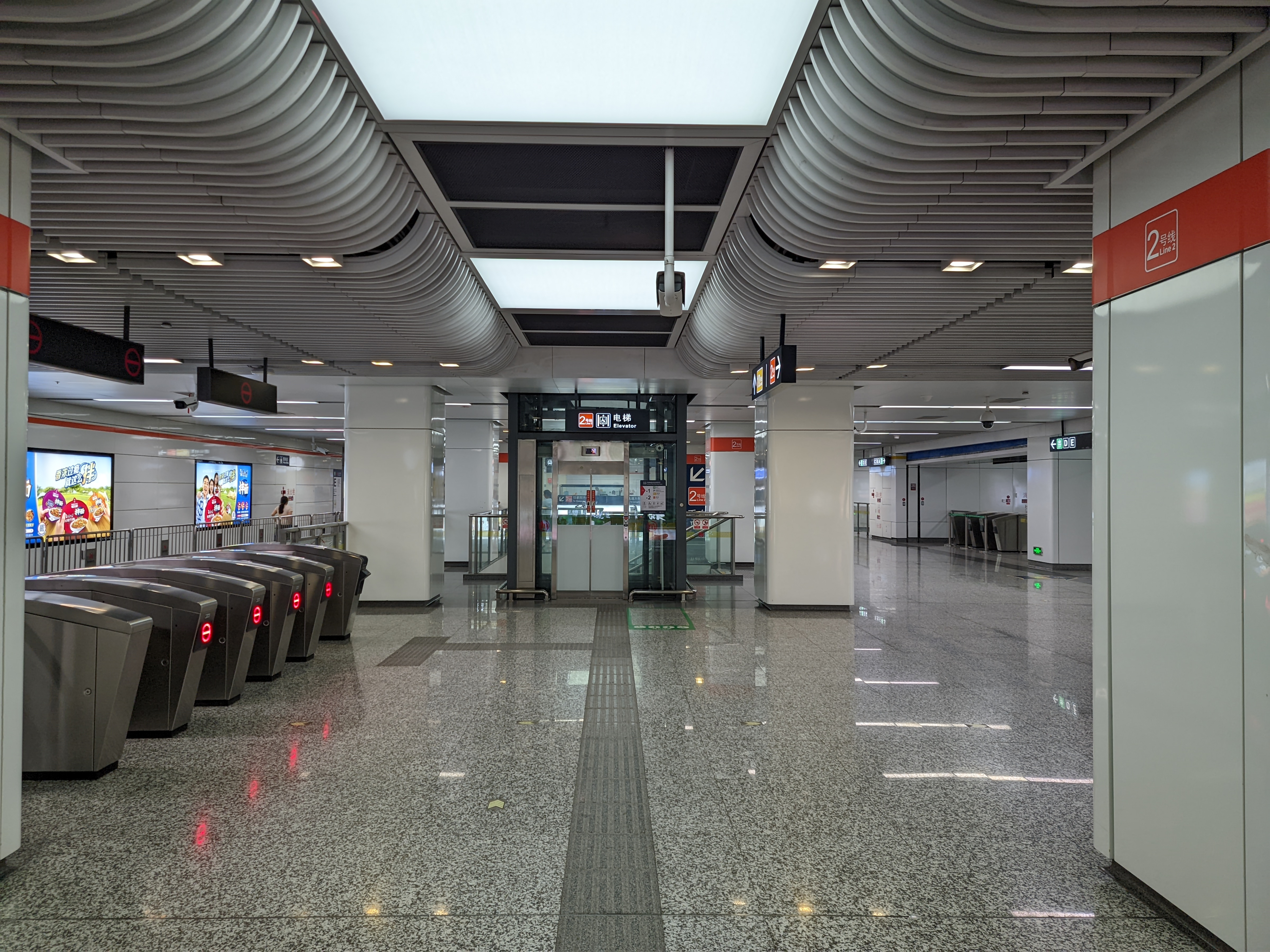
Concourse of Line 2

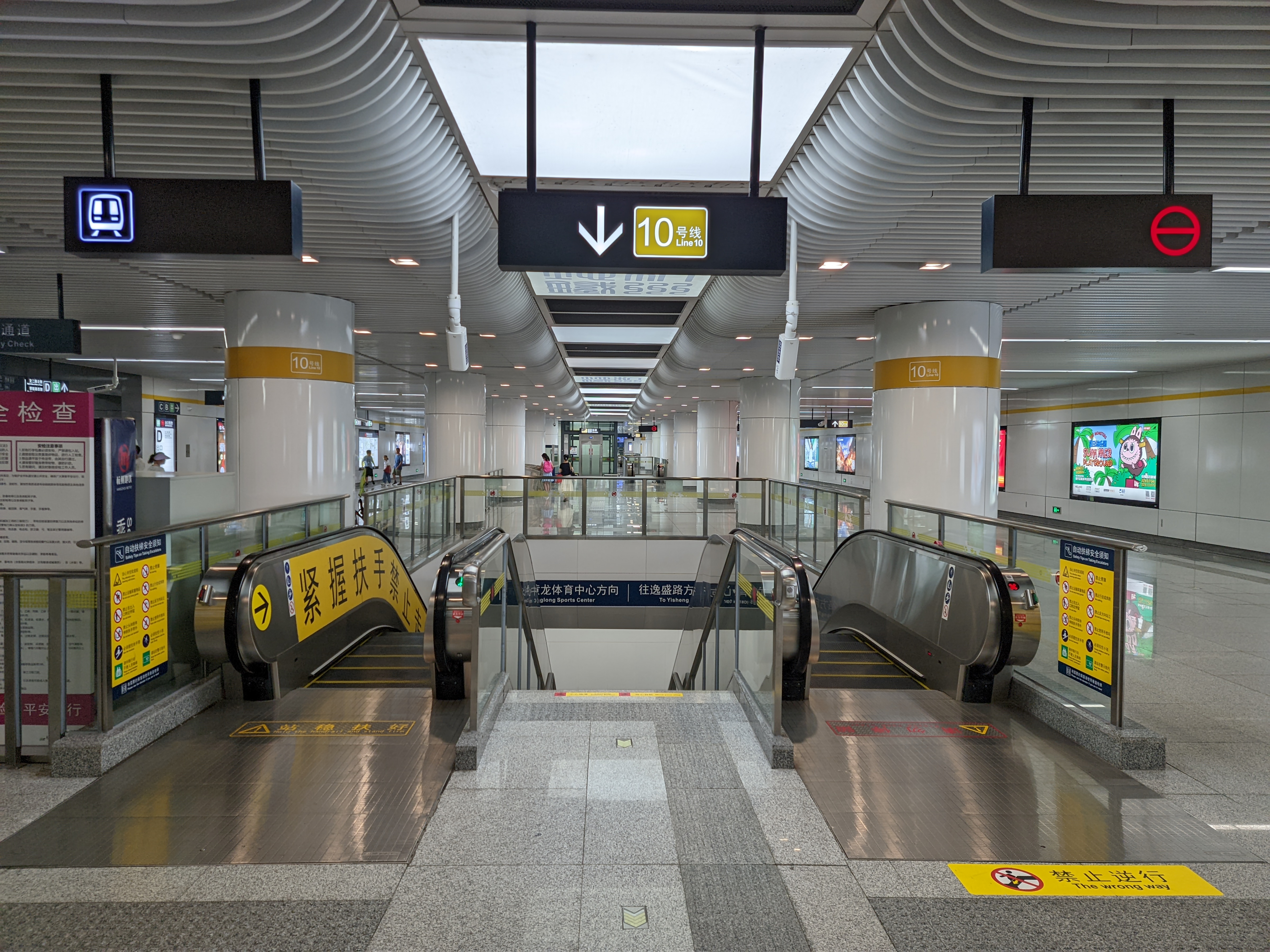
Concourse of Line 10

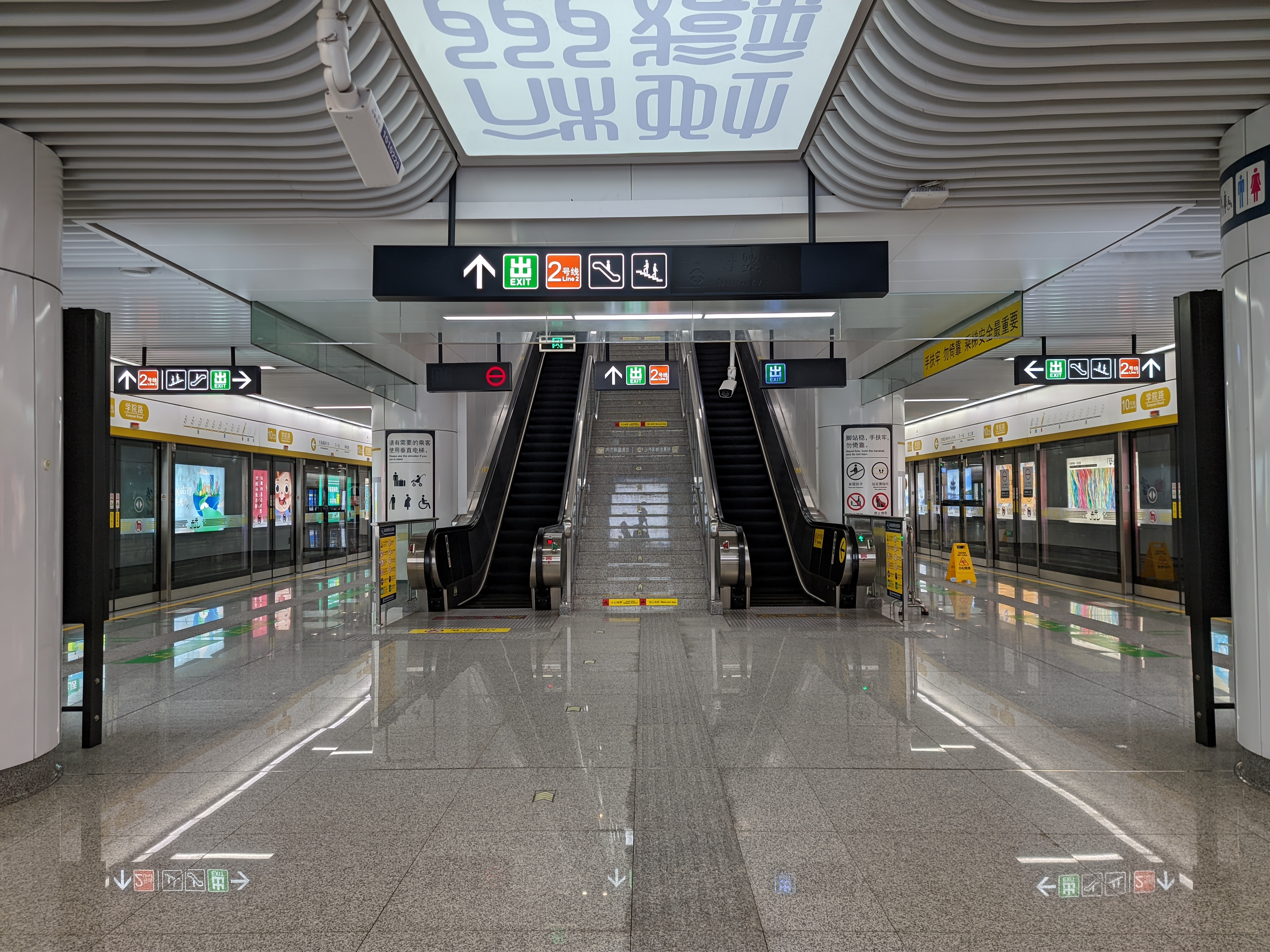
Platforms of Line 10
