= Hangxing Road station =

Metro station in Hangzhou, China

Hangxing Road 杭行路
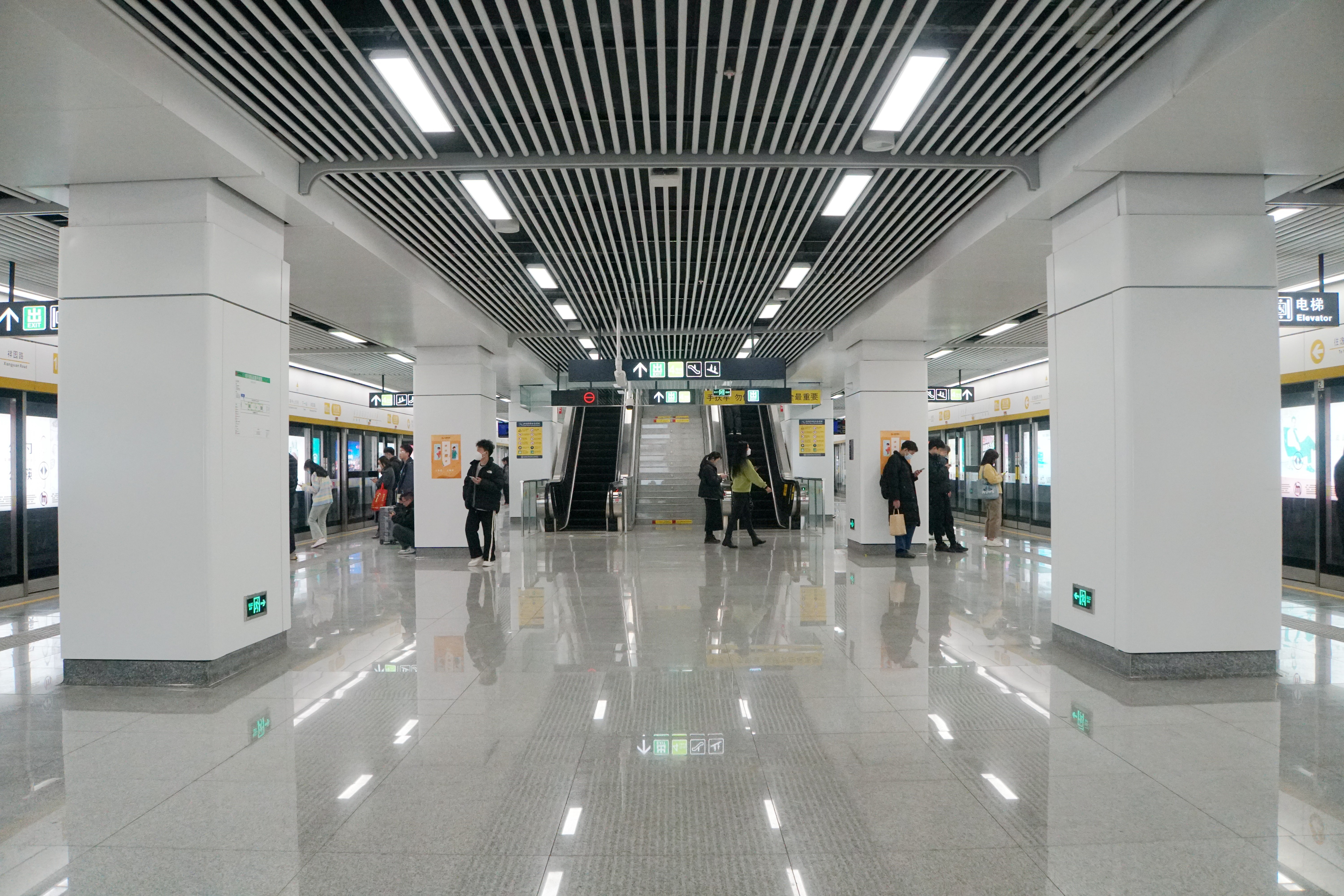
- Line 10 Platforms

General information
- Location: Liangyun Street × Xiangyuan Road; Yuhang District, Hangzhou, Zhejiang; China
- Coordinates: 30°21′21″N 120°06′35″E
- System: Hangzhou metro station
- Operator: Hangzhou Metro Corporation
- Lines: Line 4 Line 10
- Platforms: 4 (2 island platforms)

Construction
- Structure type: Underground
- Accessible: Yes

History
- Opened: 21 February 2022; 4 years ago

Services
Preceding station	Hangzhou Metro	Following station
Chuyun Road towards Puyan	Line 4	Haoyun Street towards Chihua Street
Xiangyuan Road towards Huanglong Sports Center	Line 10	Jinde Road towards Yisheng Road
Route map
Location

Hangxing Road (Chinese: 杭行路) is a metro station of Line 4 and Line 10 of the Hangzhou Metro in China. It is located in Yuhang District of Hangzhou. The station was opened on 21 February 2022.

== Station layout ==
Hangxing Road has three levels: a concourse, and separate levels for lines 4 and 10. Basement 2 is for line 10, and basement 3 is for line 4. Each of these consists of an island platform with two tracks.

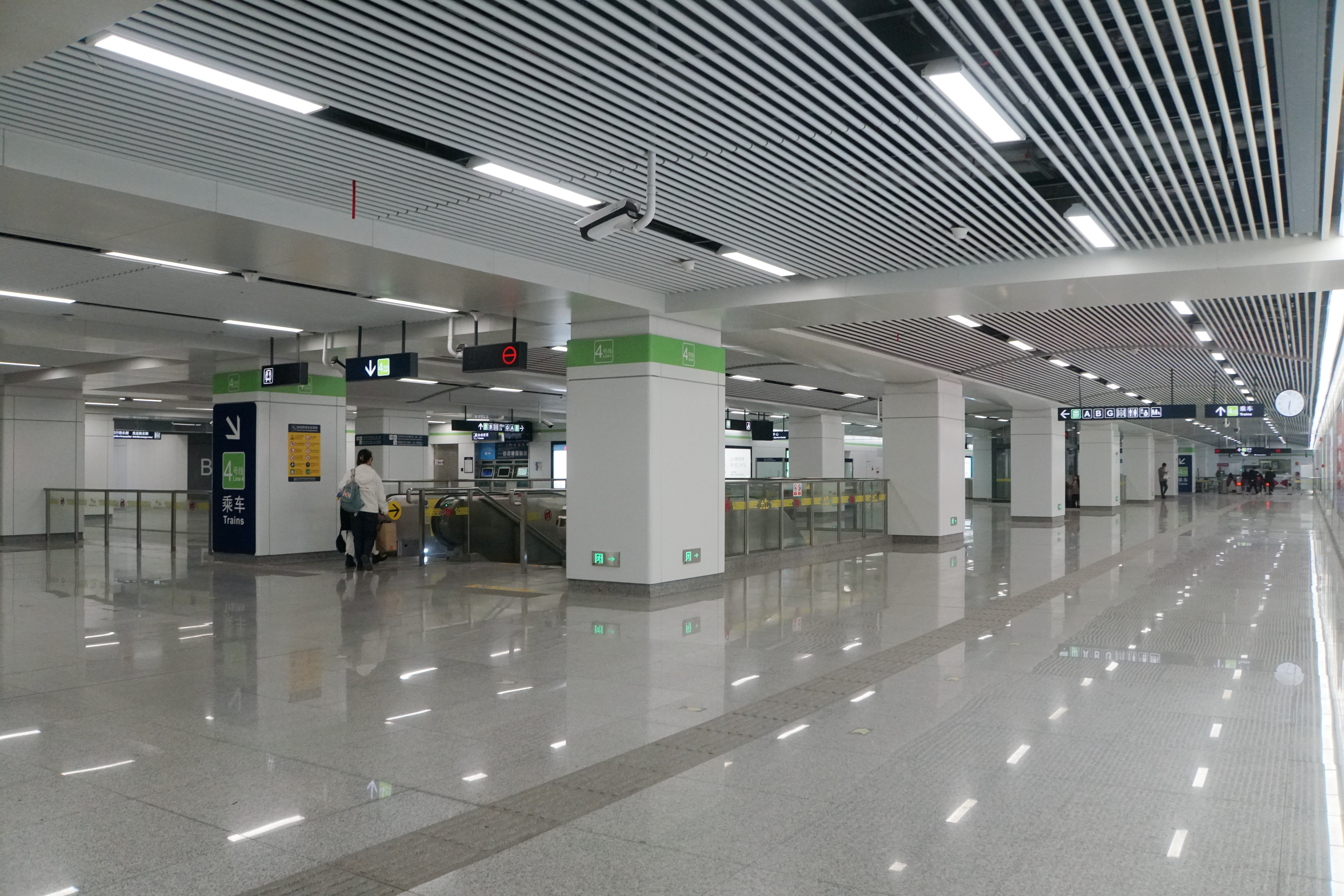
Concourse of Line 4

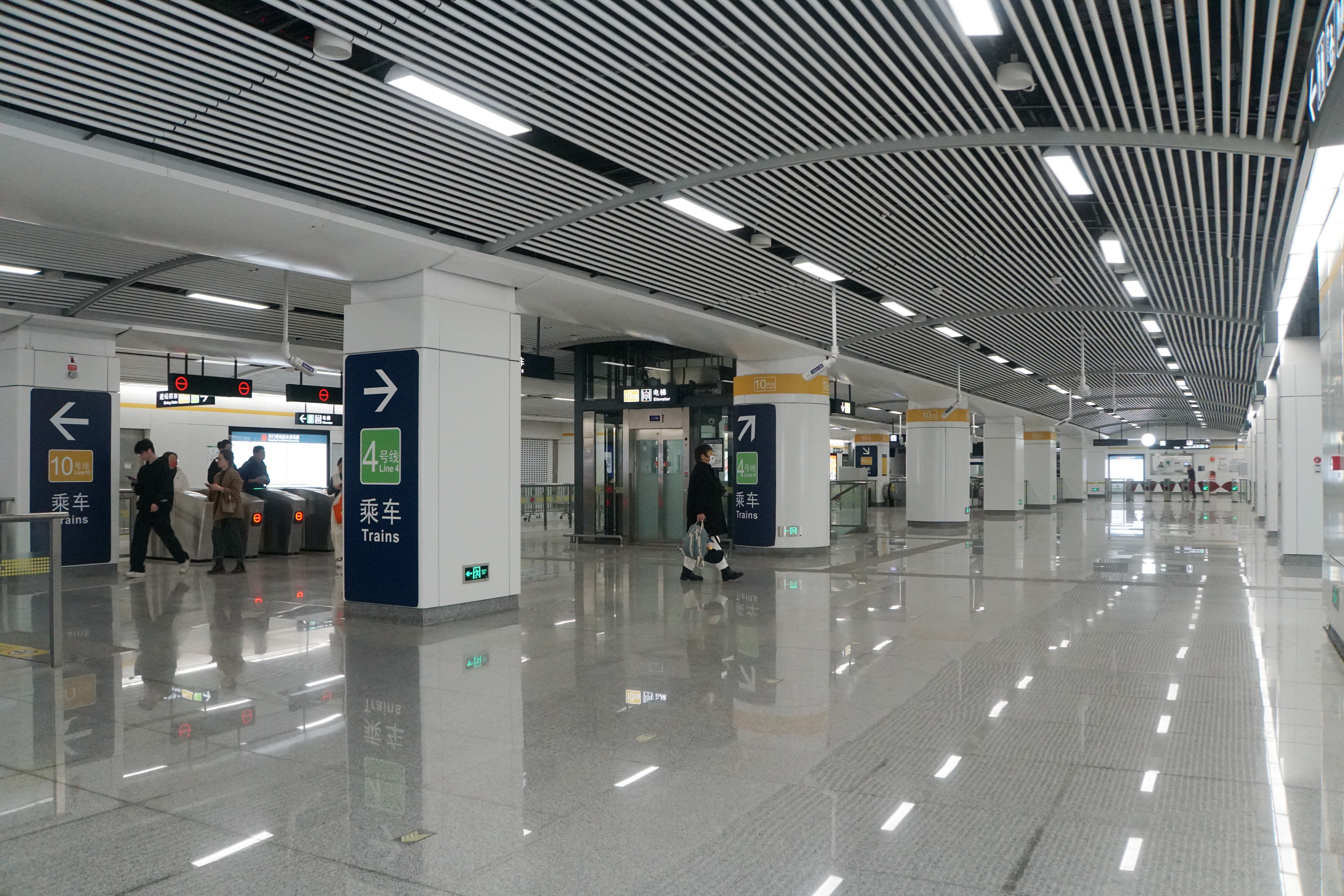
Concourse of Line 10

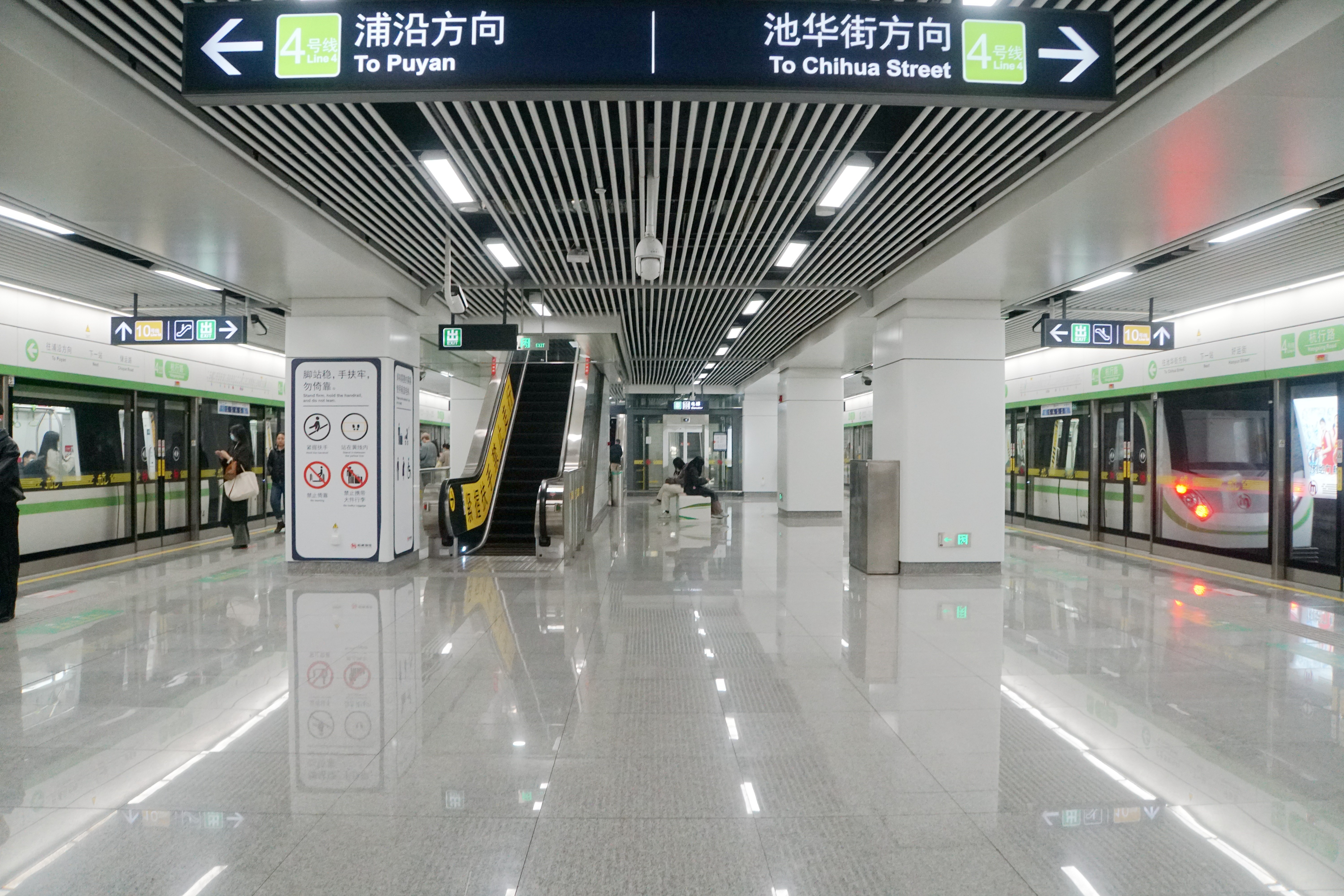
Platforms of Line 4

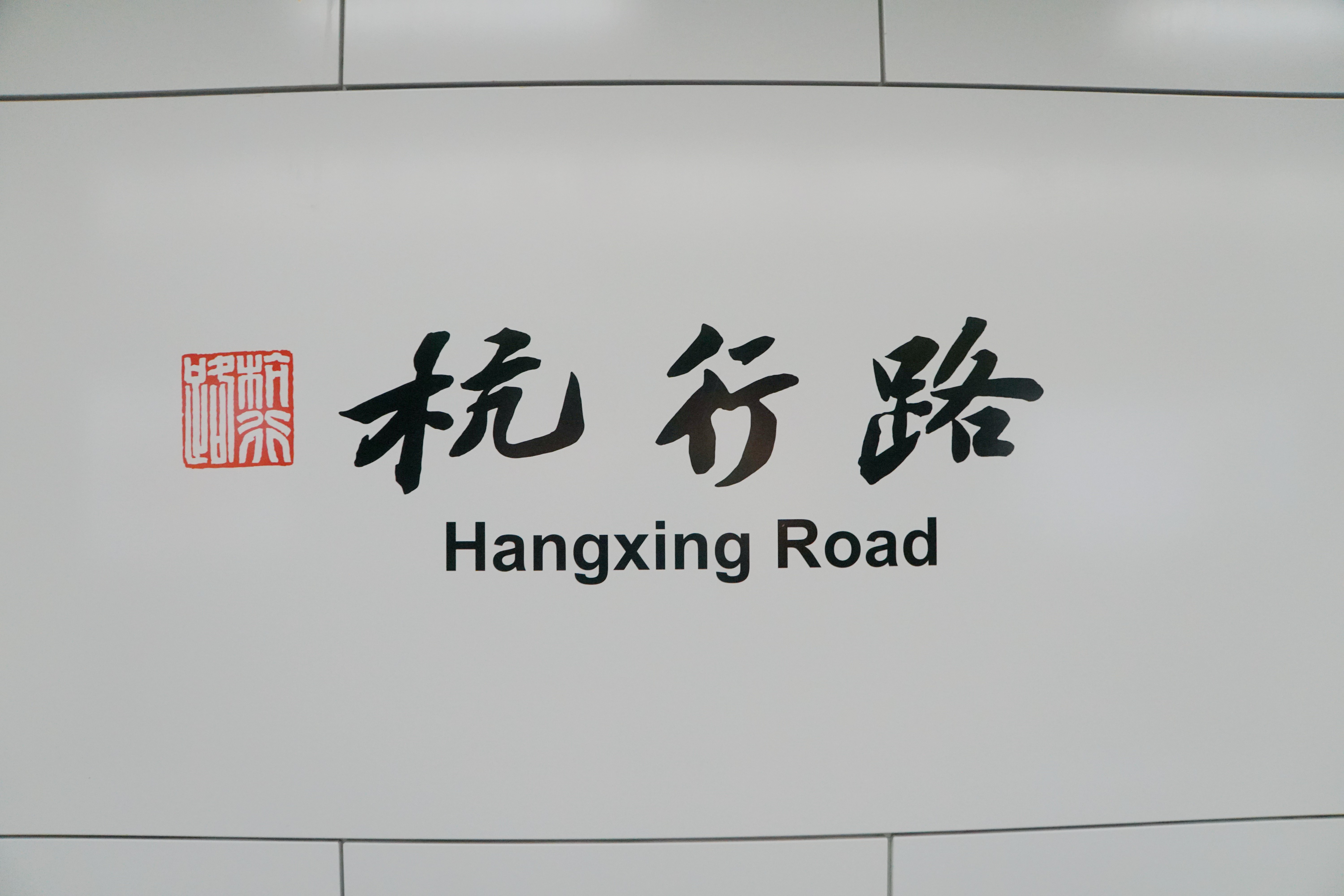
Station name in Chinese calligraphy

== Entrances/exits ==
- A: north side of Liangyun Street, Beiruan Road
- B: east side of Hangxing Road, north side of Liangyun Street
- C: YOHOO PARK
- D: north side of Liangyun Street, west side of Hangxing Road
- E: Hangzhou Chengbei MixC
- F1 & F2: Changwu Apartment (Zone 1)
- G1 & G2: Changwu Apartment (Zone 1), Liangyun Jiayuan Community
