= Beida Bridge station =

Metro station in Hangzhou, China

Beida Bridge 北大桥
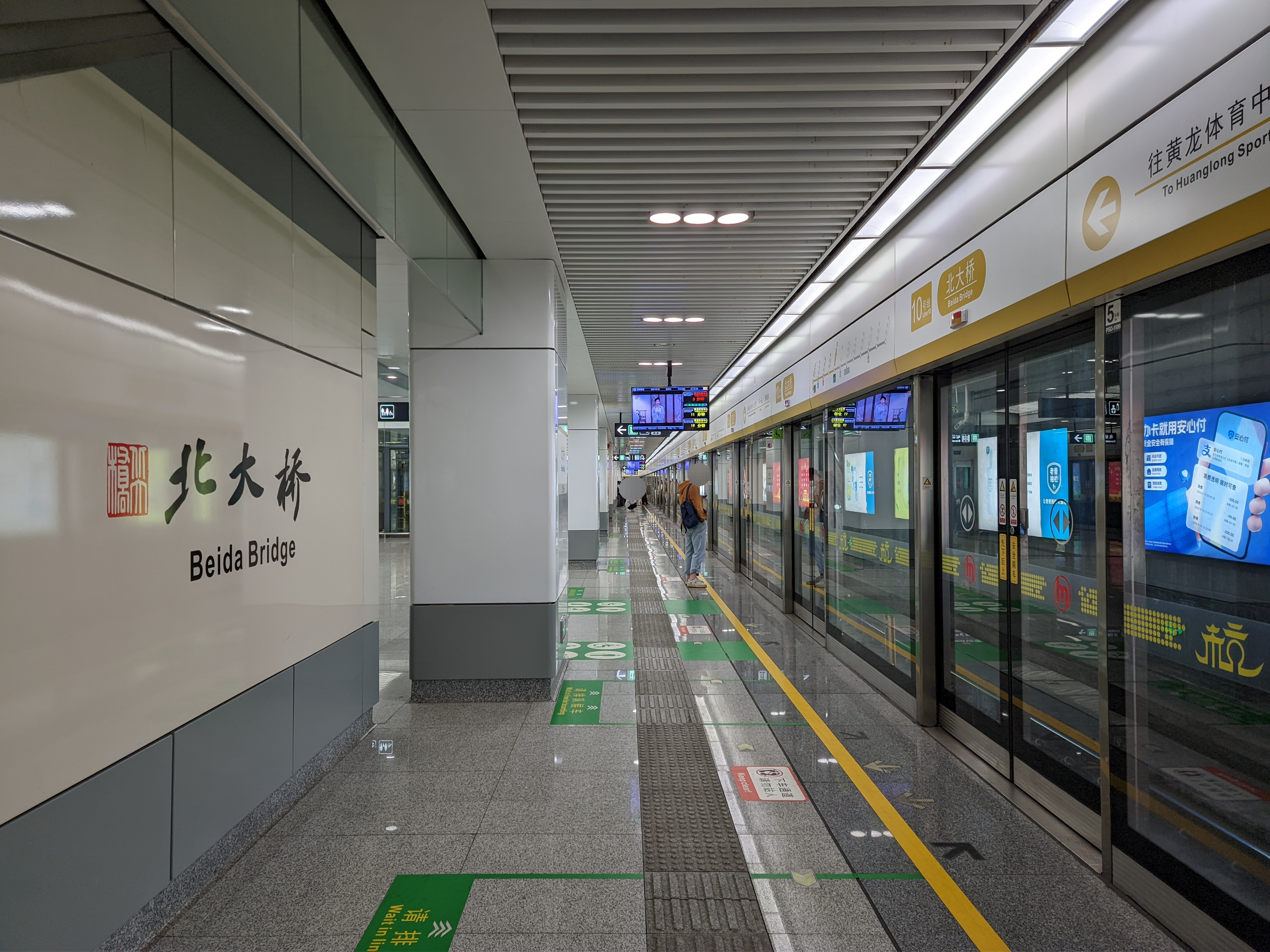
- Platforms

General information
- Location: Moganshan Road × Yinxiu Road & Guyun Road; Gongshu District, Hangzhou, Zhejiang; China
- Coordinates: 30.30584°N 120.12481°E
- System: Hangzhou metro station
- Operator: Hangzhou Metro Corporation
- Line: Line 10
- Platforms: 2 (1 island platform)

Construction
- Structure type: Underground
- Accessible: Yes

History
- Opened: 21 February 2022

Services
Preceding station	Hangzhou Metro	Following station
Cuibai Road towards Huanglong Sports Center	Line 10	Hemu towards Yisheng Road
Location

Beida Bridge (simplified Chinese: 北大桥; traditional Chinese: 北大橋) is a metro station of Line 10 of the Hangzhou Metro in China. It is located in Gongshu District of Hangzhou. The station was opened on 21 February 2022.

== Station layout ==
Beida Bridge has two levels: a concourse, and an island platform with two tracks for line 10.

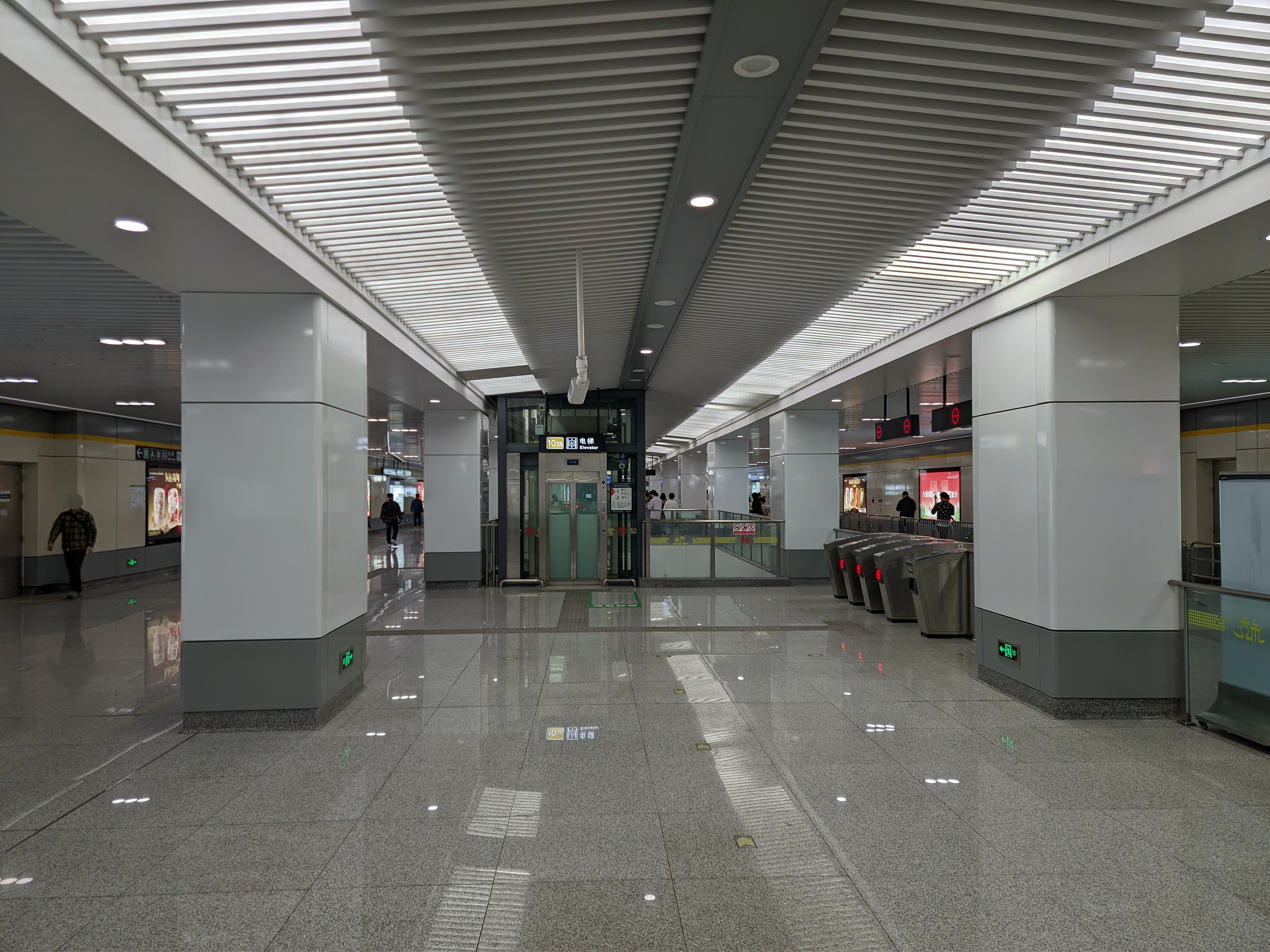
Concourse

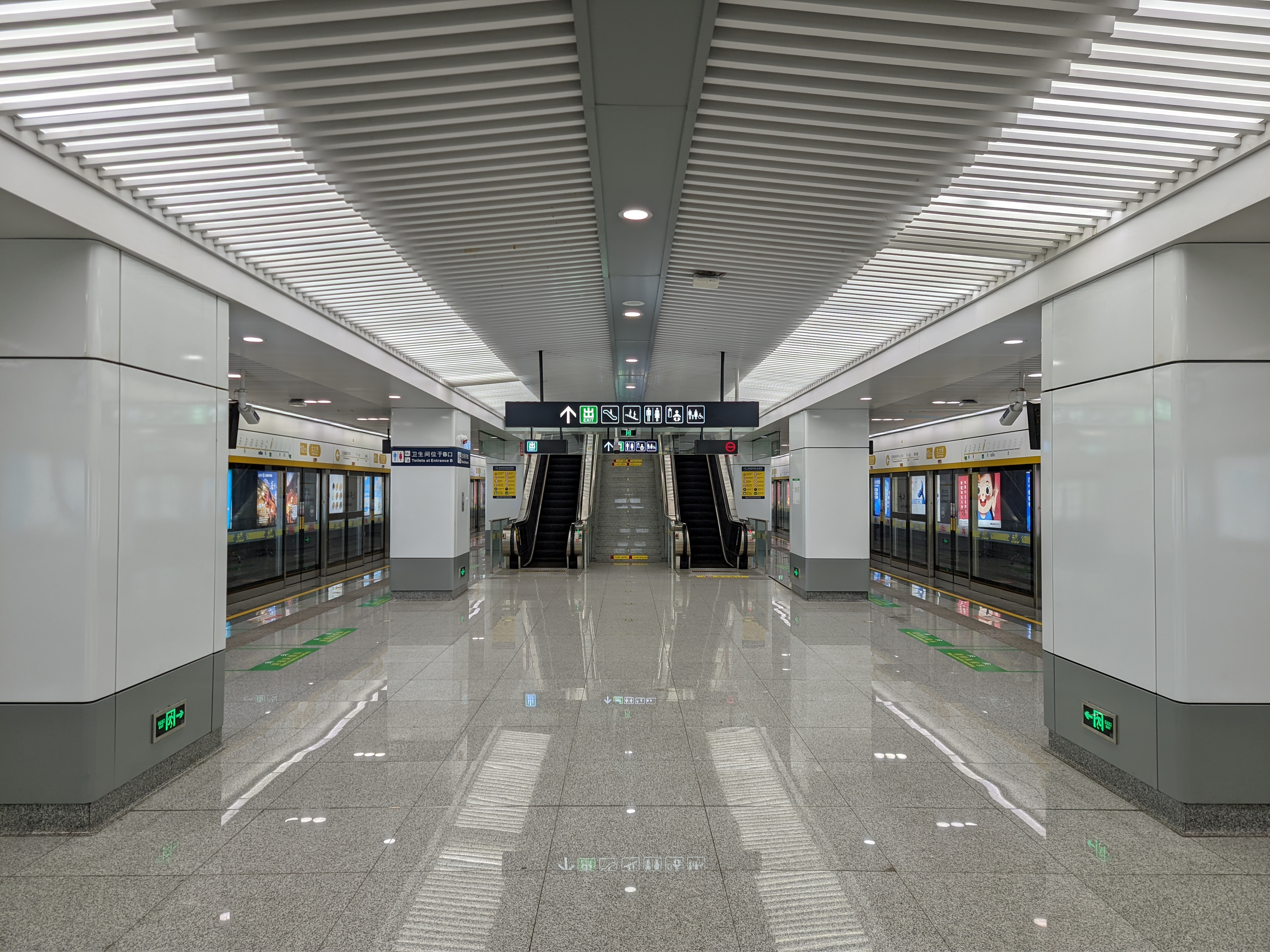
Platforms

== Entrances/exits ==
- A: Hangzhou Automobile Advanced Technician's School
- B: Splendid City
- C: Joy City
- D: Shiji Xinzhu Community, Hangzhou Changzheng High School
