= Hemu station =

Metro station in China

Hemu 和睦
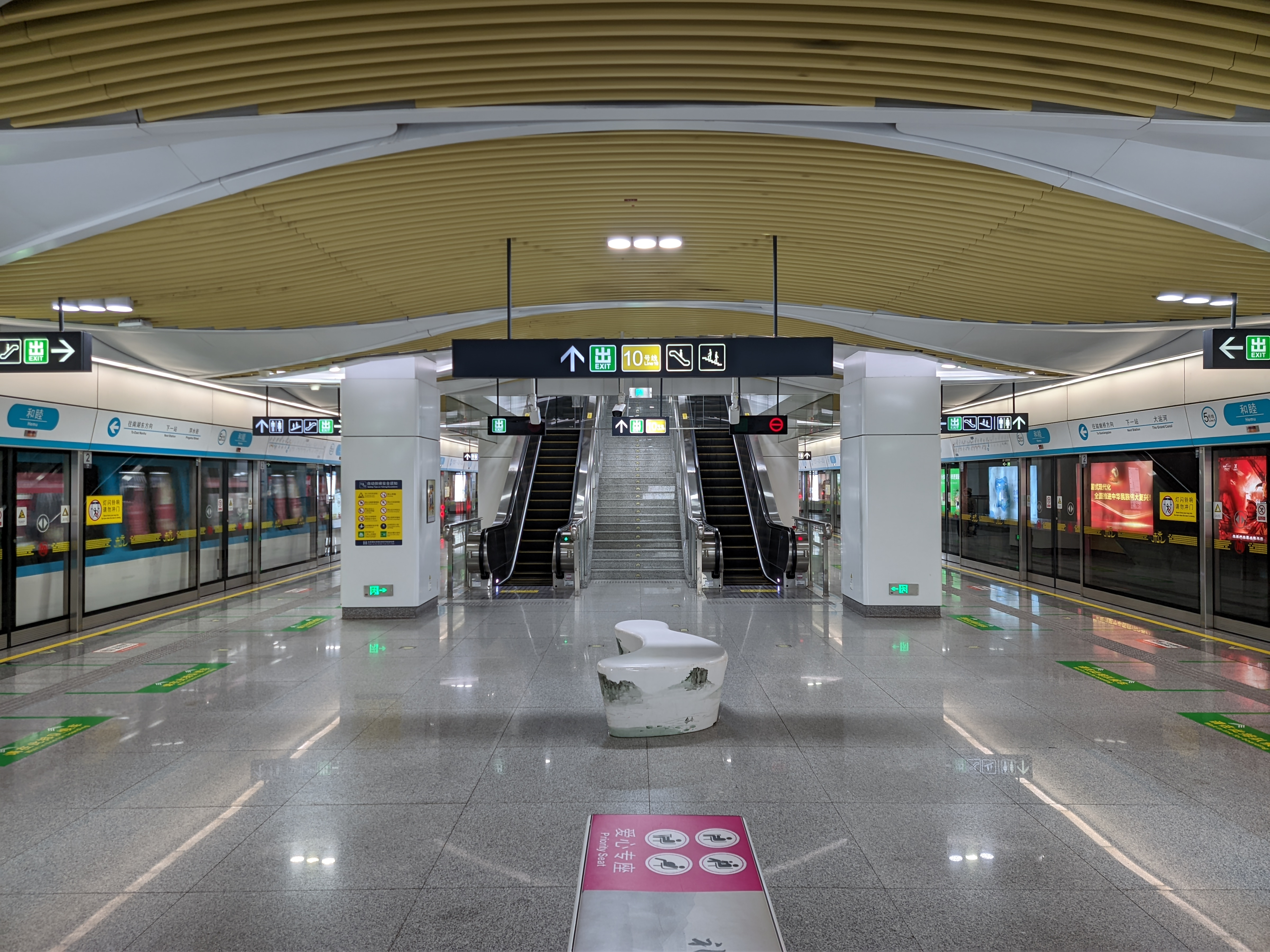
- Platforms of Line 5

General information
- Location: Pingshui Street & Pingshui Street (E) × Moganshan Road; Gongshu District, Hangzhou, Zhejiang; China
- Coordinates: 30°18′43″N 120°06′56″E
- System: Hangzhou metro station
- Operator: Hangzhou MTR Line 5 Corporation; Hangzhou Metro Corporation
- Lines: Line 5 Line 10
- Platforms: 4 (2 island platforms)

Construction
- Structure type: Underground
- Accessible: Yes

Other information
- Station code: HEM

History
- Opened: June 24, 2019 (Line 5); February 21, 2022 (Line 10)

Services
Preceding station	Hangzhou Metro	Following station
Pingshui Street towards East Nanhu	Line 5	The Grand Canal towards Guniangqiao
Beida Bridge towards Huanglong Sports Center	Line 10	Huayuangang towards Yisheng Road
Location

Hemu (Chinese: 和睦) is a metro station on Line 5 and Line 10 of the Hangzhou Metro in China. It is located in the Gongshu District of Hangzhou.

== Station layout ==
Hemu has three levels: a concourse, and separate levels for lines 5 and 10. Basement 2 is for line 5, and basement 3 is for line 10. Each of these consists of an island platform with two tracks.

== Entrances/exits ==
- A: Hemu Xincun Community
- B: east side of Moganshan Road
- C: The One Place
- D1: The One Place
- D2: Zhelv Dexin Xichen Community
- D3: Blue Diamond Mansions
- D4: Shangjing Shui'an Huating Community
- D5: Shangjing Shui'an Yuting Community
- E: Blue Diamond Mansions
