= Wensan Road station =

Metro station in Hangzhou, China

Wensan Road 文三路
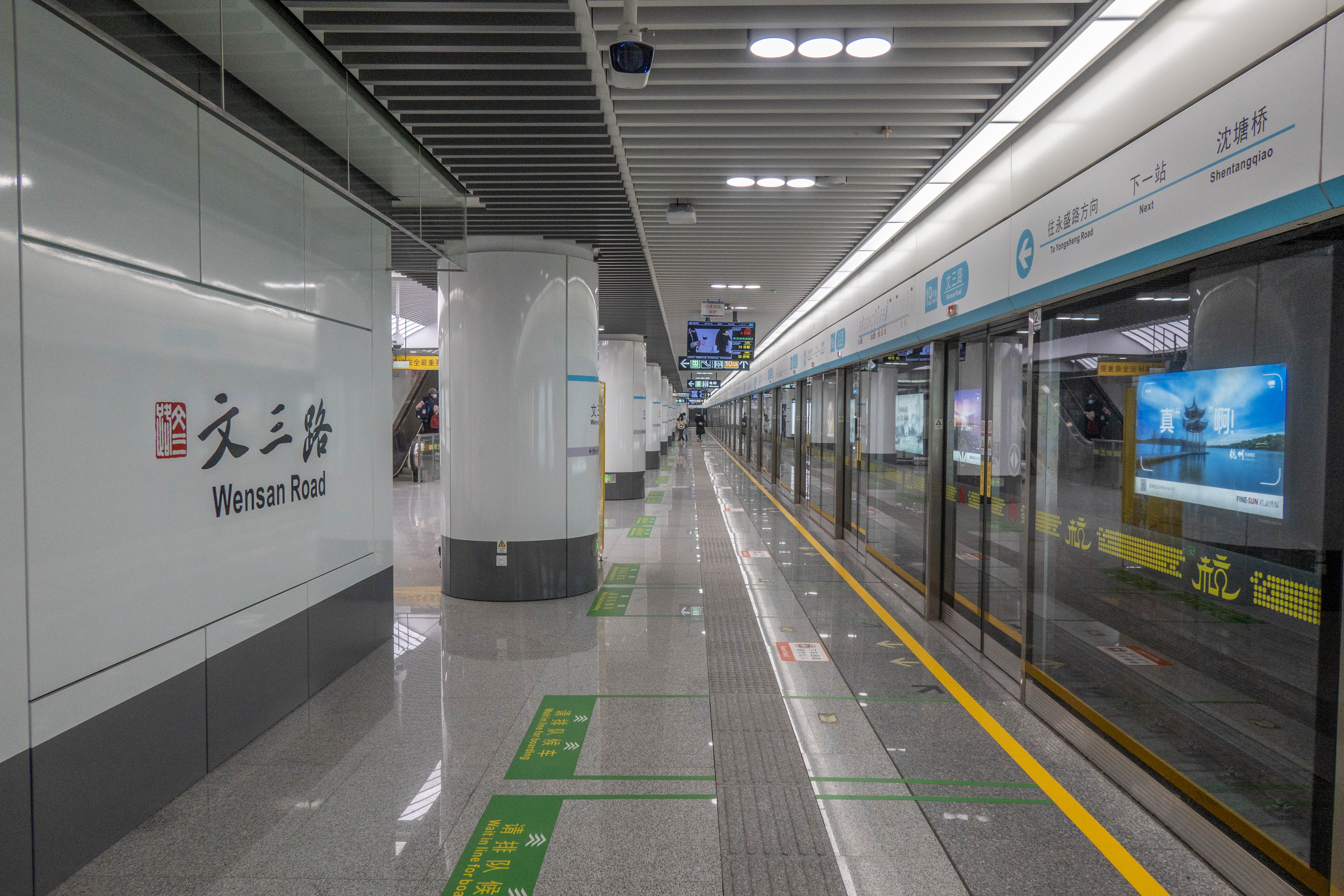
- Line 19 platform

General information
- Location: Xueyuan Road × Wensan Road; Xihu District, Hangzhou, Zhejiang; China
- Coordinates: 30°16′45″N 120°07′27″E
- Operated by: Hangzhou Metro Corporation
- Lines: Line 10; Line 19
- Platforms: 4 (1 island platform and 2 side platforms)

Construction
- Structure type: Underground
- Accessible: Yes

History
- Opened: 21 February 2023

Services
Preceding station	Hangzhou Metro	Following station
Huanglong Sports Center Terminus	Line 10	Xueyuan Road towards Yisheng Road
Wulian towards Tiaoxi	Line 19	Shentangqiao towards Yongsheng Road
Location

Wensan Road (Chinese: 文三路) is a metro station of Line 10 and Line 19 of the Hangzhou Metro in China. It is located in Xihu District of Hangzhou. The station was opened on 21 February 2023.

== Station layout ==
Wensan Road has three levels: basement 1 is a concourse, basement 2 is an island platforms with two tracks for line 19, and basement 3 are two side platforms with two tracks for line 10.

== Entrances/exits ==
- A: Jiulian Xincun community
- B: Qianjiang Technology Building
- C: Qianjiang Technology Building
- D1: Huanglong International Center
- D2: Huayuan Building, Huaxing Technology Building
- D3: Huaxing Times Plaza
- E1 & E2: Huanglong International Center
- F: Huanglong International Center
- G: Huanglong International Center
