= Jinde Road station =

Metro station in Hangzhou, China

Jinde Road 金德路
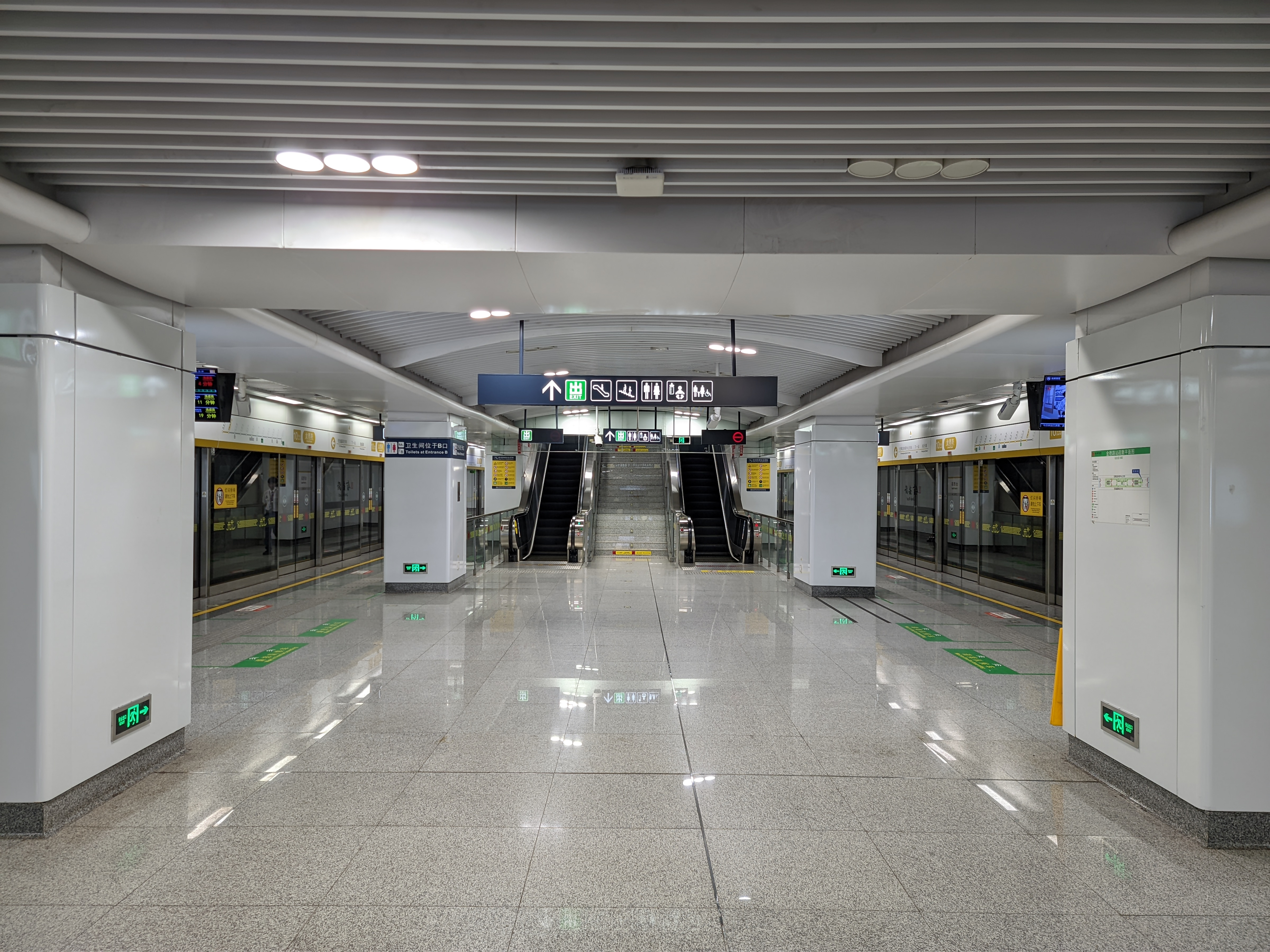
- Platforms

General information
- Location: Hangxing Road × Jinde Road & Fenyue Street; Yuhang District, Hangzhou, Zhejiang; China
- Coordinates: 30°22′00″N 120°06′34″E
- System: Hangzhou metro station
- Operator: Hangzhou Metro Corporation
- Line: Line 10
- Platforms: 2 (1 island platform)

Construction
- Structure type: Underground
- Accessible: Yes

History
- Opened: 21 February 2022

Services
Preceding station	Hangzhou Metro	Following station
Hangxing Road towards Huanglong Sports Center	Line 10	Yisheng Road Terminus
Location

Jinde Road (Chinese: 金德路) is a metro station of Line 10 of the Hangzhou Metro in China. It is located in Yuhang District of Hangzhou. The station was opened on 21 February 2022.

== Station layout ==
Jinde Road has two levels: a concourse, and an island platform with two tracks for line 10.

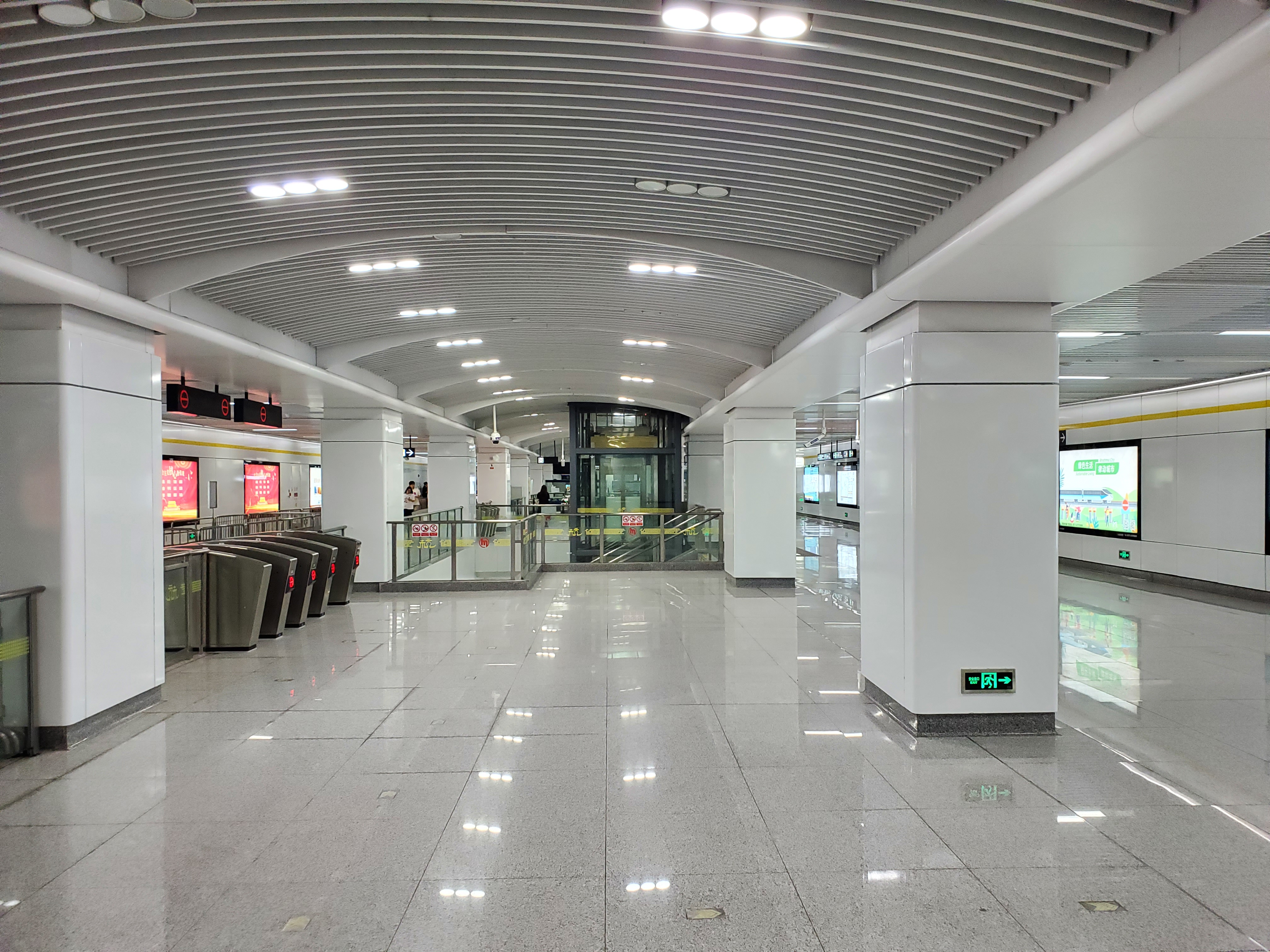
Concourse

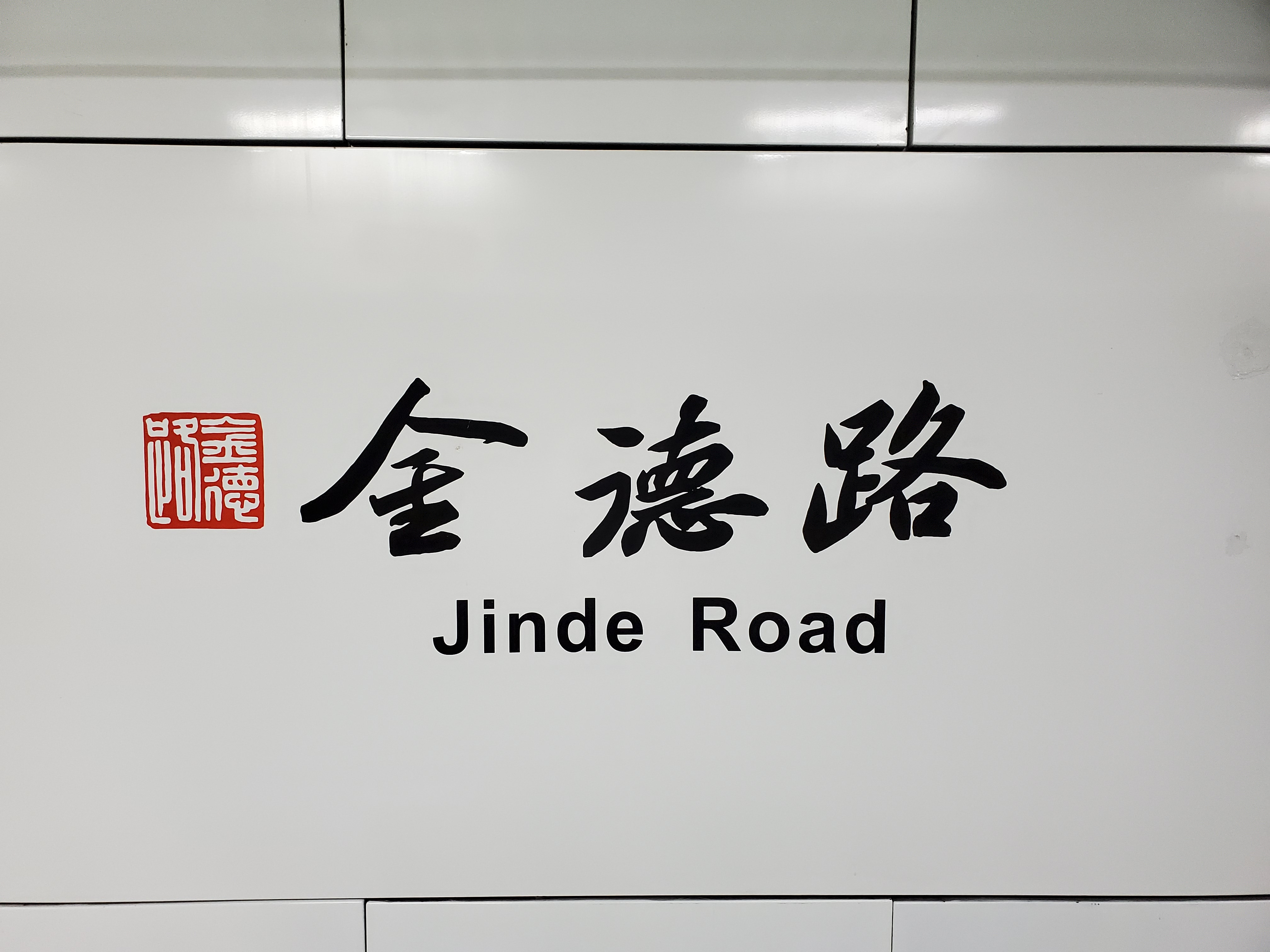
Station name in Chinese calligraphy

== Entrances/exits ==
- A: Yunhe Jinting Community (Zone 2)
- B: west side of Hangxing Road, Kangliang Street
- C: west side of Hangxing Road
- D: Yunhe Jinting Community (Zone 3)
