= Dazhu Bridge =

Dazhu Bridge 大诸桥
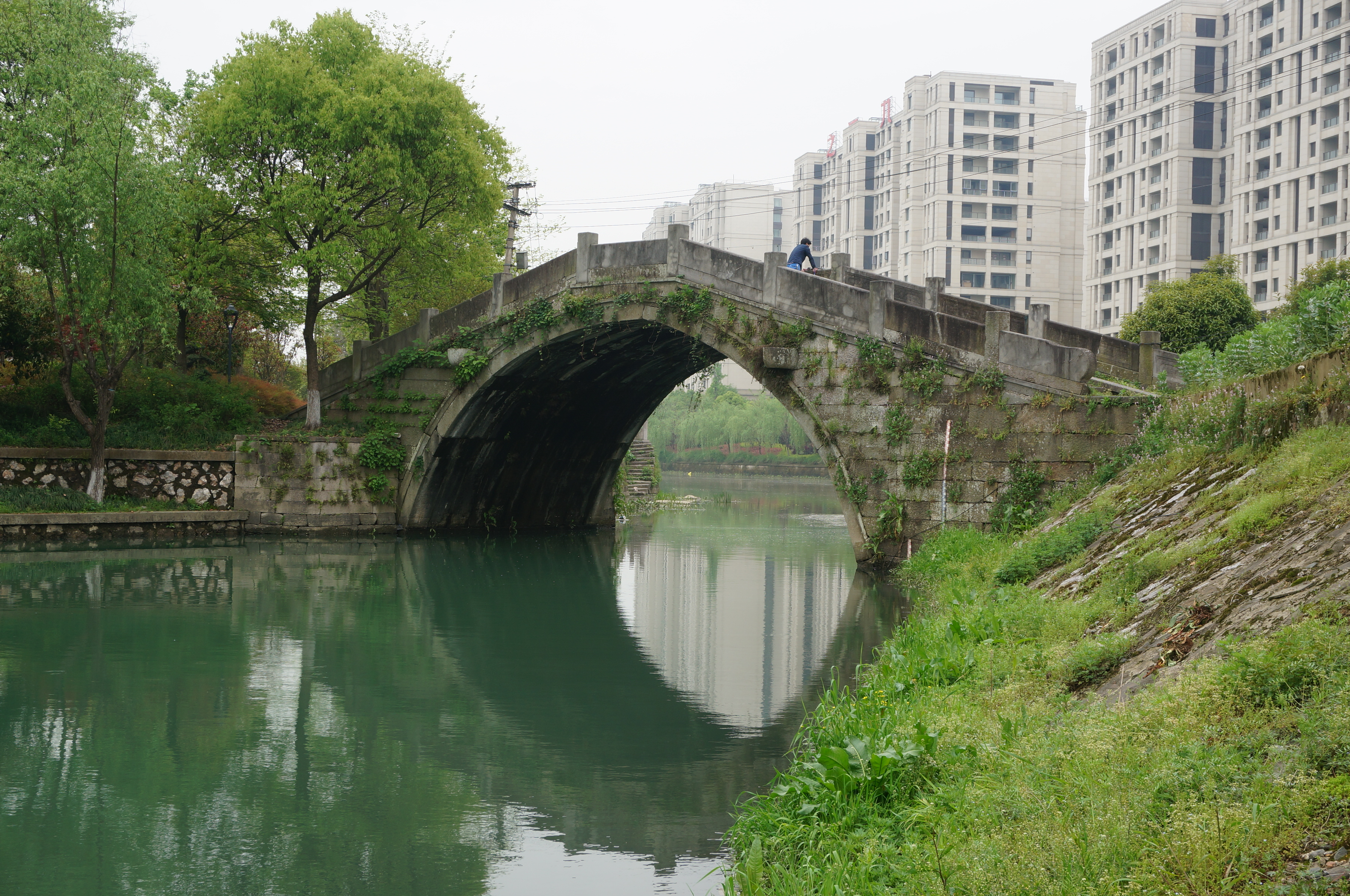
- The Dazhu Bridge in April 2016.
- Coordinates: 30°10′22″N 120°05′45″E
- Locale: Zhuantang Subdistrict, Xihu District, Hangzhou, Zhejiang
- Other name(s): Zhu Bridge; Shangzhu Bridge; Wannian Bridge

Characteristics
- Design: Arch Bridge
- Material: Stone
- Total length: 28 metres (92 ft)
- Width: 6 metres (20 ft)

History
- Construction start: Song dynasty (907–1279)
- Construction end: 1588 (reconstruction)

Dazhu Bridge (simplified Chinese: 大诸桥; traditional Chinese: 大諸橋; pinyin: Dàzhū Qiáo), formerly known as "Zhu Bridge" (朱桥; 朱橋), "Shangzhu Bridge" (上朱桥; 上朱橋)or "Wannian Bridge" (万年桥; 萬年橋), is a historic stone arch bridge in Zhuantang Subdistrict, Xihu District, Hangzhou, Zhejiang province. It is 28-metre (92 ft) long and 6-metre (20 ft) wide.

== History ==
The bridge was originally built in the Song dynasty (907–1279). It was rebuilt in 1588, during the reign of Wanli Emperor in the Ming dynasty. On July 9, 2000, it was designated as a municipal cultural unit by the local government.
