= Line 10 (Hangzhou Metro) =

Metro line of the Hangzhou Metro system in China

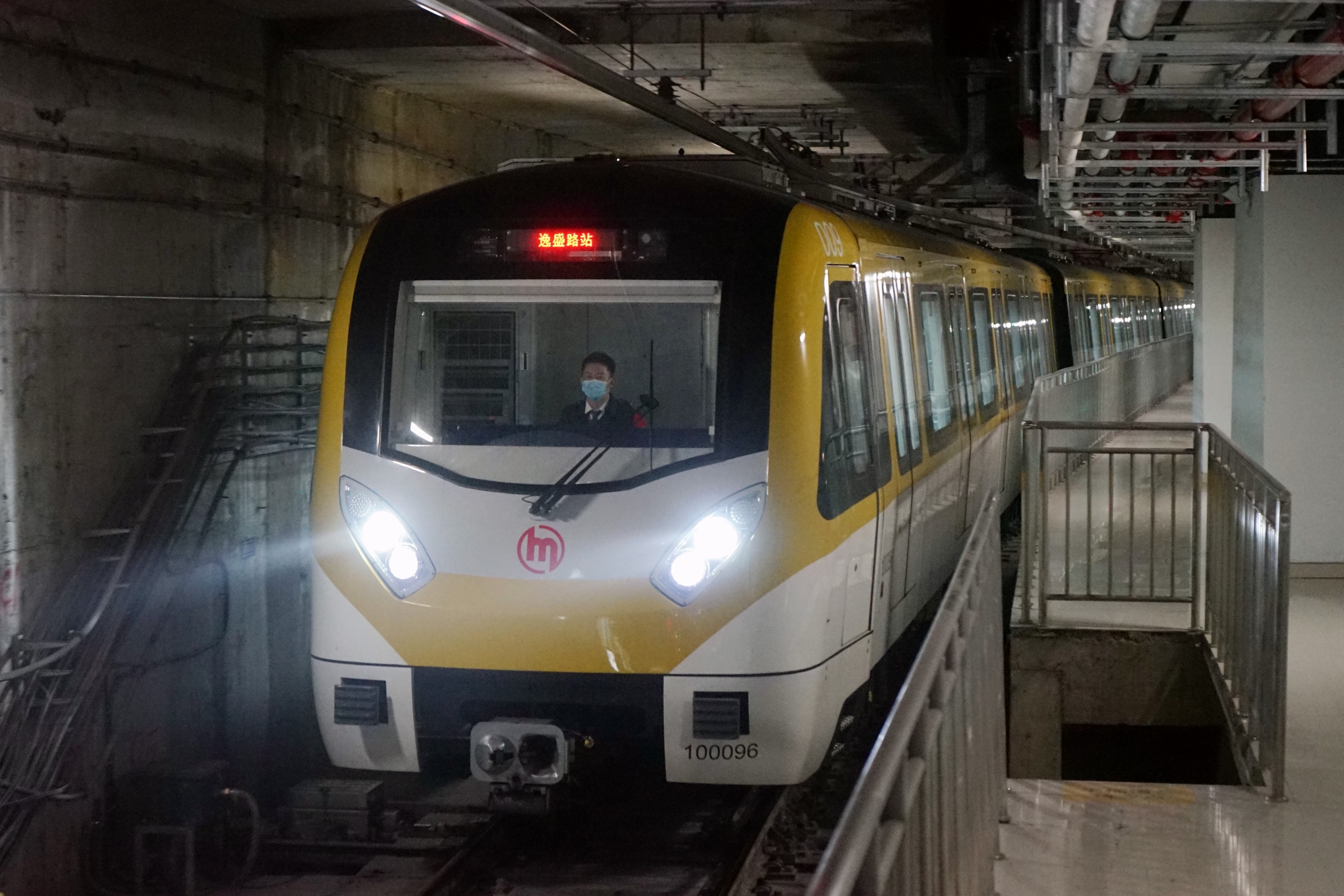
- A train of Hangzhou Metro Line 10

Overview
- Status: In operation
- Owner: City of Hangzhou
- Locale: Hangzhou, Zhejiang, China
- Termini: Yisheng Road; Huanglong Sports Center
- Stations: 12

Service
- Type: Rapid transit
- System: Hangzhou Metro
- Services: 1
- Operator(s): Hangzhou Metro Corporation
- Depot(s): Renhe Depot
- Rolling stock: PM170

History
- Opened: February 21, 2022; 4 years ago

Technical
- Line length: 14.67 km (9.12 mi)
- Character: Underground
- Track gauge: 1,435 mm (4 ft 8 1/2 in)
- Electrification: Overhead, 1500 V DC
- Operating speed: 80 km/h (50 mph)

Line 10 drawn to scale.

Line 10 of the Hangzhou Metro (simplified Chinese: 杭州地铁十号线; traditional Chinese: 杭州地鐵十號線; pinyin: Hángzhōu Dìtiě Shíhào Xiàn) is a metro line in Hangzhou. The line is 14.7 km (9.1 mi) long and will run between Huanglong Sports Center station in Xihu District and Yisheng Road station in Yuhang District up in the north, passing through west Hangzhou. Yisheng Road to Cuibai Road section of the line was opened on 21 February 2022. The one-station extension to Xueyuan Road was opened on 24 June 2022. The section from Xueyuan Road to Huanglong Sports Center was opened on 22 September 2022. The line is colored gold on maps.

== Opening timeline ==
Segment	Commencement	Length	Station(s)	Name
Yisheng Road — Cuibai Road	21 February 2022	12 km (7 mi)	9	Phase 1
Cuibai Road — Xueyuan Road	24 June 2022	3 km (2 mi)	1	Phase 1
Xueyuan Road — Huanglong Sports Center	22 September 2022	3 km (2 mi)	1	Phase 1
Wensan Road	21 February 2023	Not applicable	1	Infill station

== Stations ==
Station name		Connections	Distance km	Location
English	Chinese	Connections	Distance km	Location
Yisheng Road	逸盛路			Yuhang
Jinde Road	金德路			Yuhang
Hangxing Road	杭行路	4		Yuhang
Xiangyuan Road	祥园路			Gongshu
Dujiaqiao	渡驾桥			Gongshu
Huayuangang	花园岗			Gongshu
Hemu	和睦	5		Gongshu
Beida Bridge	北大桥			Gongshu
Cuibai Road	翠柏路			Xihu
Xueyuan Road	学院路	2		Xihu
Wensan Road	文三路	19		Xihu
Huanglong Sports Center	黄龙体育中心	3		Xihu

== Rolling stock ==
Stock	Class	Year built	Builder	Number built	Numbers	Formation	Depots	Line assigned	Notes
PM170	A	2020–2021	CRRC Nanjing Puzhen	96 (16 sets)	10 001 - 10 016 (100011–100166)	Tc+Mp+M+M+Mp+Tc	Renhe Depot	10	

== Incident ==
On 26 October 2022 at 11:40 am, an incident occurred at the construction site of the public network coverage project of Wensan Road station of the first phase of Line 10. During the wiring process above the bridge, a worker touched the 220V live cable that was not insulated in the incision in the strong electric bridge above the ceiling, and died after rescue failed.

== See also ==
- Hangzhou Metro
