= Dajiangdong =

Industrial park in Hangzhou

The Dajiangdong Industrial Cluster (Chinese: 大江东产业聚集区; pinyin: Dàjiāngdōng Chǎnyè Jùjíqū) is an industrial park in Hangzhou. Located in the easternmost part of the city, the cluster is around 50 km away from the city center, and 15 km away to Hangzhou Xiaoshan International Airport. Its total planned area is 427 square kilometres. Automobile manufacturing is the primary industry of the cluster, in which various motor companies have set up their plants, including Ford and Geely. The industrial cluster is also renowned for its Ferrero chocolate plant, the only Ferrero manufacturing plant in China.

Line 7 and Line 8 of Hangzhou Metro will serve the region from its scheduled completion in late 2021.
