= Huanglong Sports Center station =

Metro station in Hangzhou, China

Huanglong Sports Center 黄龙体育中心
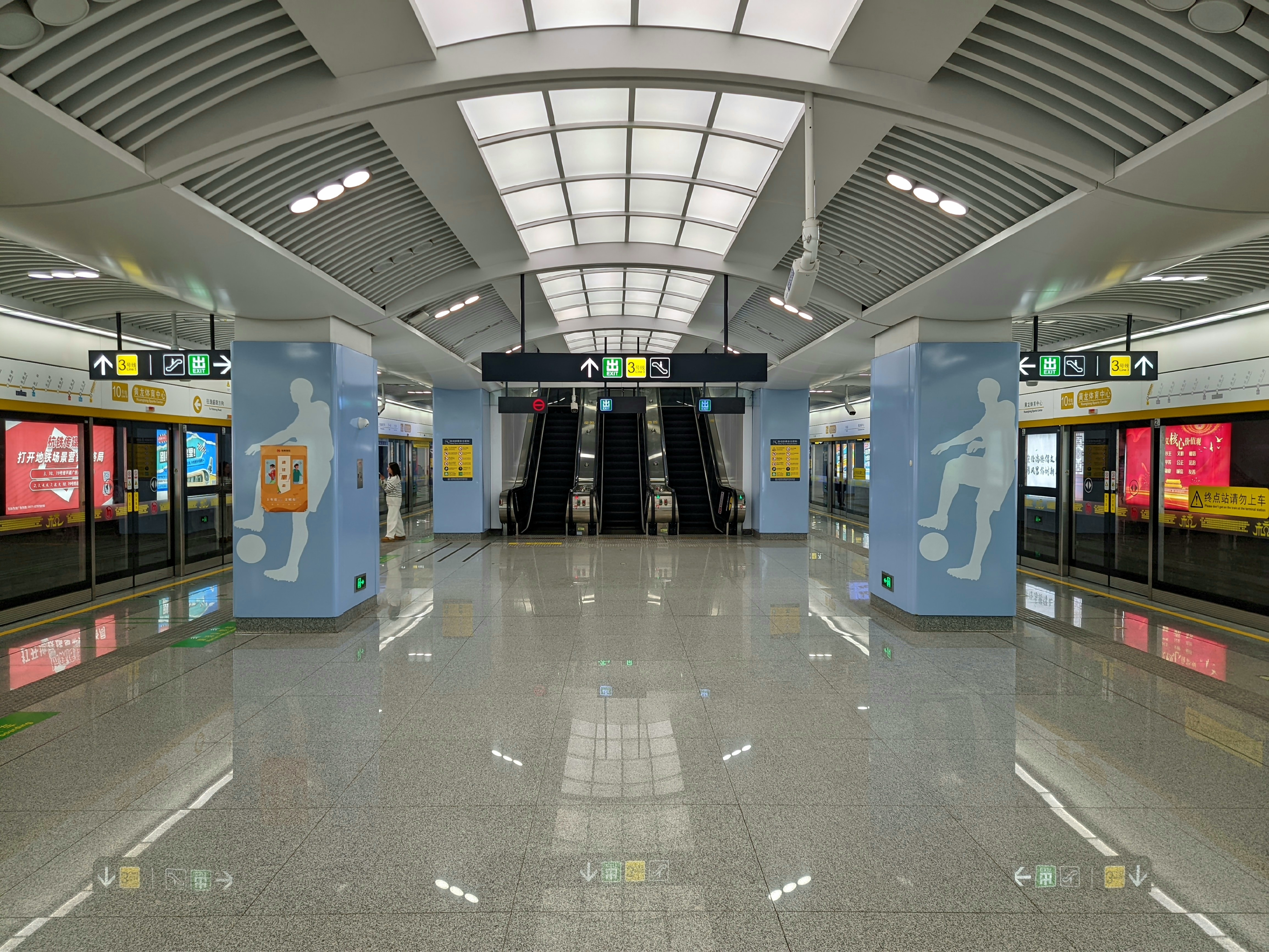
- Line 10 platforms

General information
- Location: Xihu Gymnasium, Yugu Road; Xihu District, Hangzhou, Zhejiang; China
- Coordinates: 30°16′17″N 120°07′29″E
- System: Hangzhou Metro
- Operated by: Hangzhou Metro Corporation
- Lines: Line 3 Line 10
- Platforms: 4 (2 island platforms)

Construction
- Structure type: Underground
- Accessible: Yes

History
- Opened: 10 June 2022 (Line 3); 22 September 2022 (Line 10)

Services
Preceding station	Hangzhou Metro	Following station
Gudang towards Wushanqiancun or Shima	Line 3	Huanglong Cave towards Xingqiao
Terminus	Line 10	Wensan Road towards Yisheng Road
Location

Huanglong Sports Center (simplified Chinese: 黄龙体育中心; traditional Chinese: 黃龍體育中心) is a metro station of Line 3 and Line 10 of the Hangzhou Metro in China. It is located in Xihu District of Hangzhou. The part of Line 3 was opened on 21 February 2022. The part of Line 10 was opened on 22 September 2022.

== Station layout ==
Huanglong Sports Center has four levels: a concourse, an equipment area for staffs, and separate levels for lines 3 and 10. Basement 2 is for line 10, and basement 4 is for line 3. Each of these consists of an island platform with two tracks.

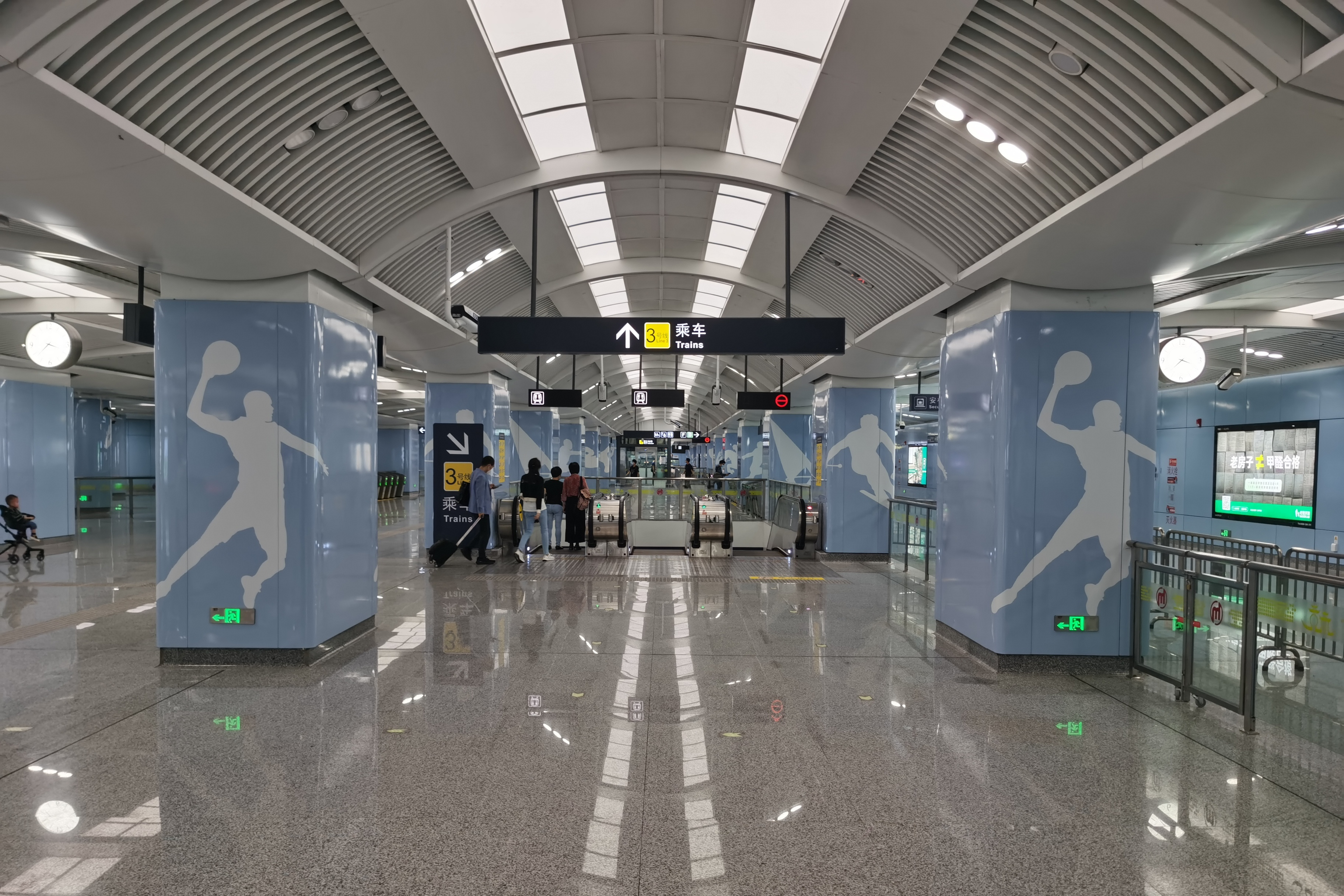
Concourse (Line 3)

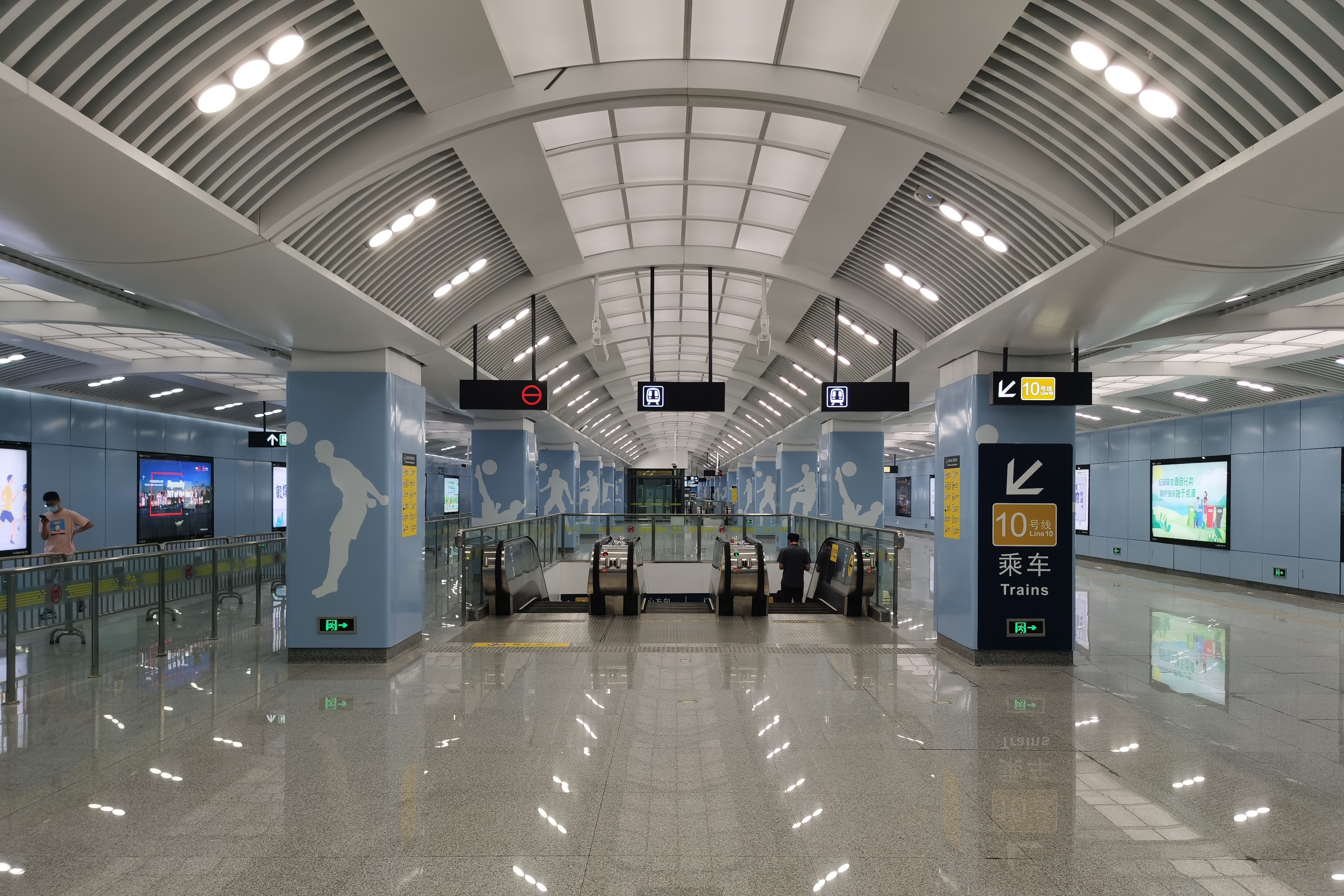
Concourse (Line 10)

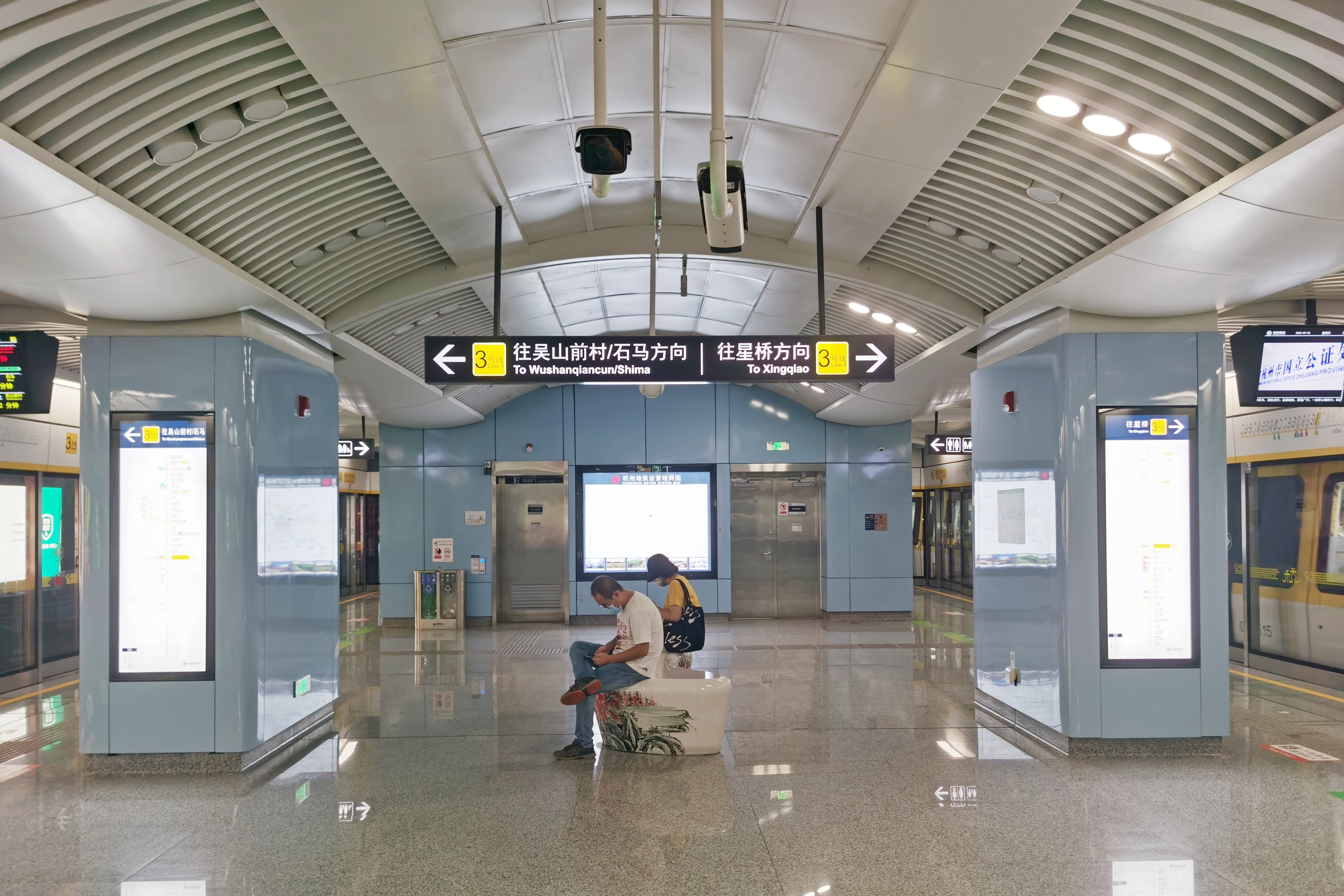
Line 3 platforms

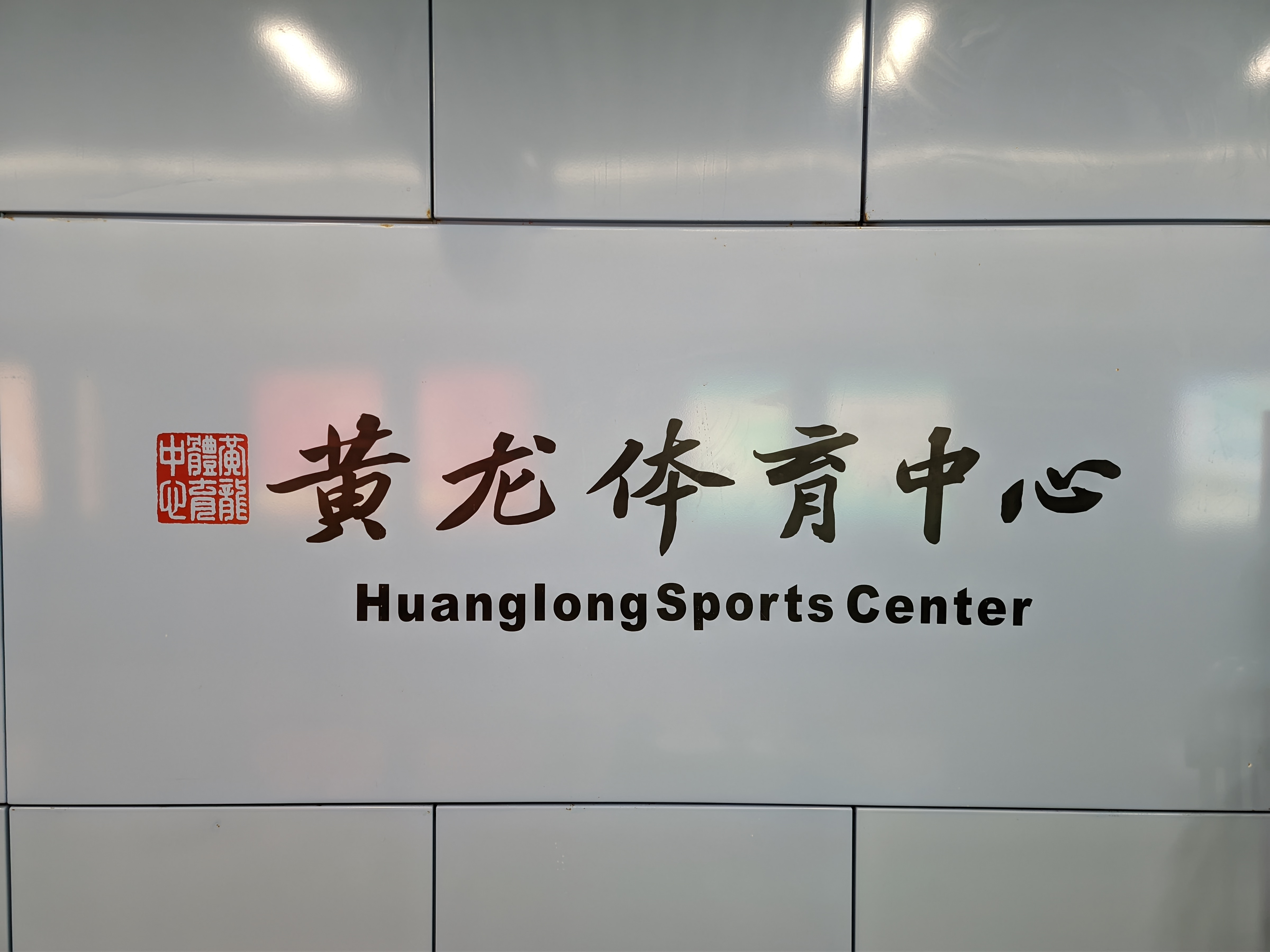
Station name

== Entrances/exits ==
- A: Xihu Gymnasium
- B: east side of Yugu Road, Xihu Gymnasium
- C: east side of Yugu Road, Tianmushan Road
- D: west side of Yugu Road, south side of Xixi Road
- F: Xihu Gymnasium, Huanglong Sports Centre
