= Yisheng Road station =

Metro station in Hangzhou, China

Yisheng Road 逸盛路
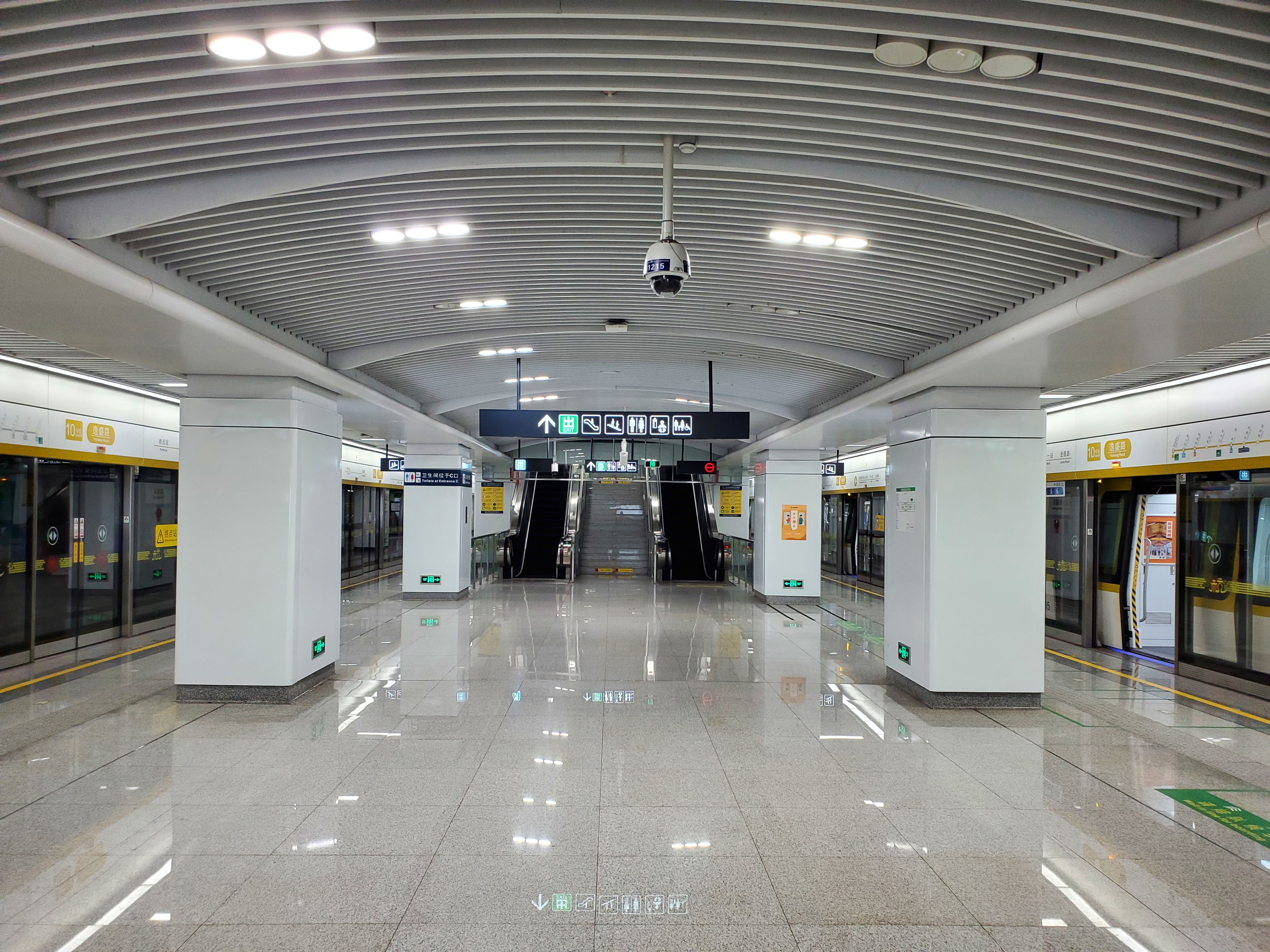
- Platforms

General information
- Location: Ganghong Road (W) × Yisheng Road; Yuhang District, Hangzhou, Zhejiang; China
- Coordinates: 30°22′49″N 120°06′33″E
- System: Hangzhou metro station
- Operator: Hangzhou Metro Corporation
- Line: Line 10
- Platforms: 2 (1 island platform)

Construction
- Structure type: Underground
- Accessible: Yes

History
- Opened: 21 February 2022

Services
Preceding station	Hangzhou Metro	Following station
Jinde Road towards Huanglong Sports Center	Line 10	Terminus
Location

Yisheng Road (Chinese: 逸盛路) is a metro station of Line 10 of the Hangzhou Metro. It is located in Yuhang District of Hangzhou. The station was opened on 21 February 2022. It is the northern terminus of Line 10.

== Station layout ==
Yisheng Road has two levels: a concourse, and an island platform with two tracks for line 10.

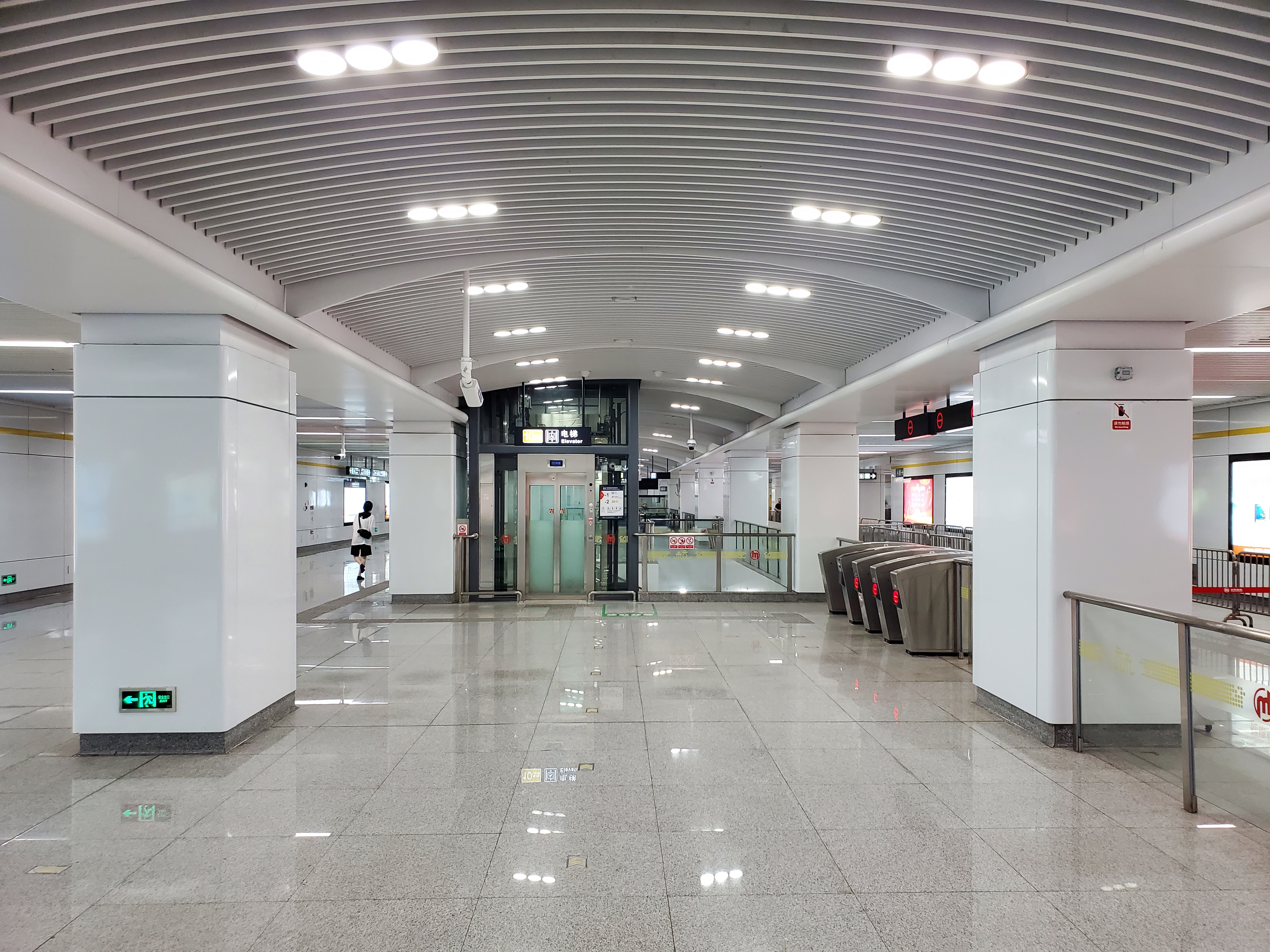
Concourse

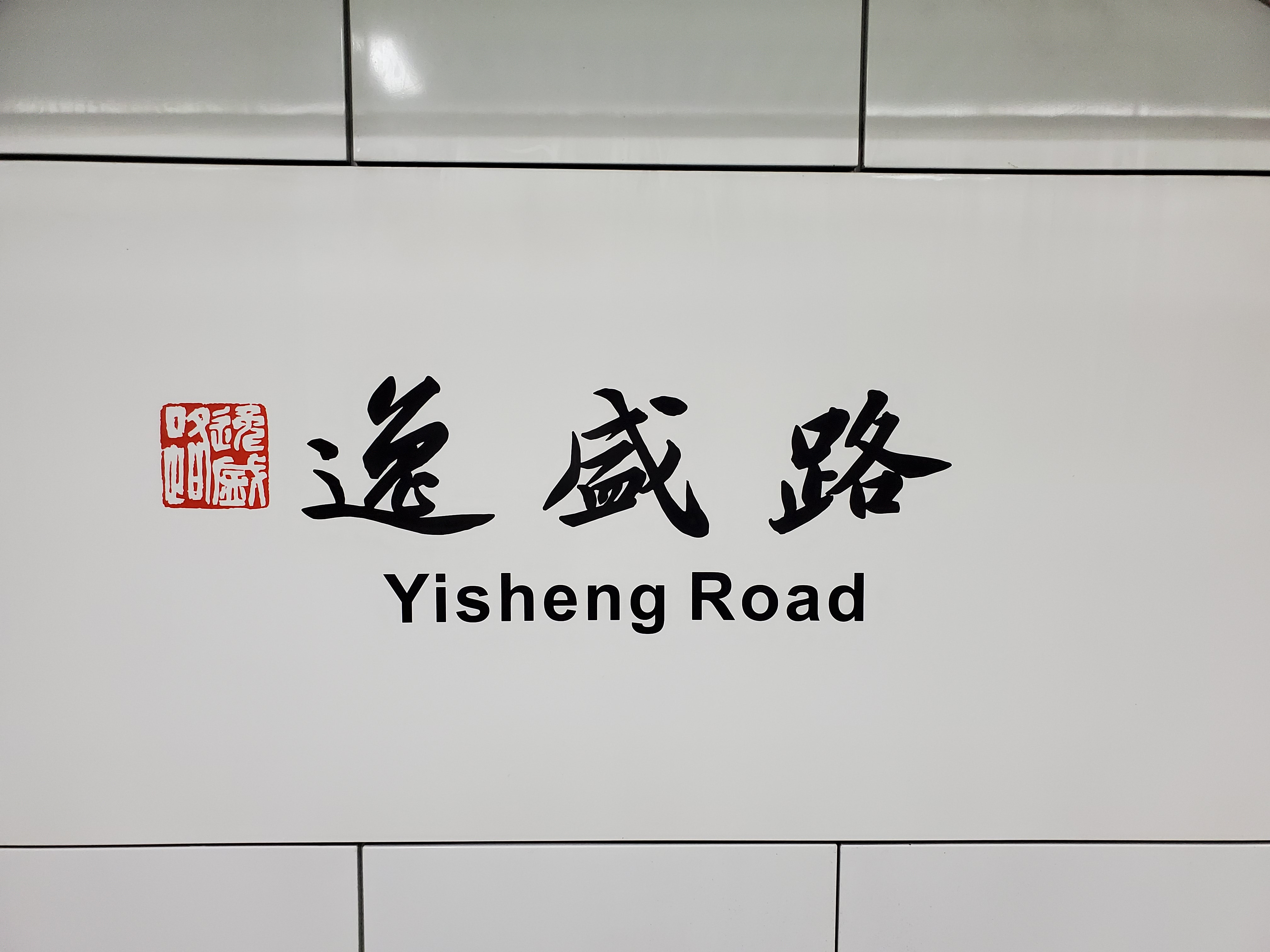
Station name in Chinese calligraphy

== Entrances/exits ==
- A: east side of Ganghong Road (W), north side of Yisheng Road
- B1 & B2: west side of Ganghong Road (W), south side of Yisheng Road
- C: east side of Ganghong Road (W), south side of Yisheng Road
