= Hangzhou Metro =

Rapid transit system in Zhejiang, China

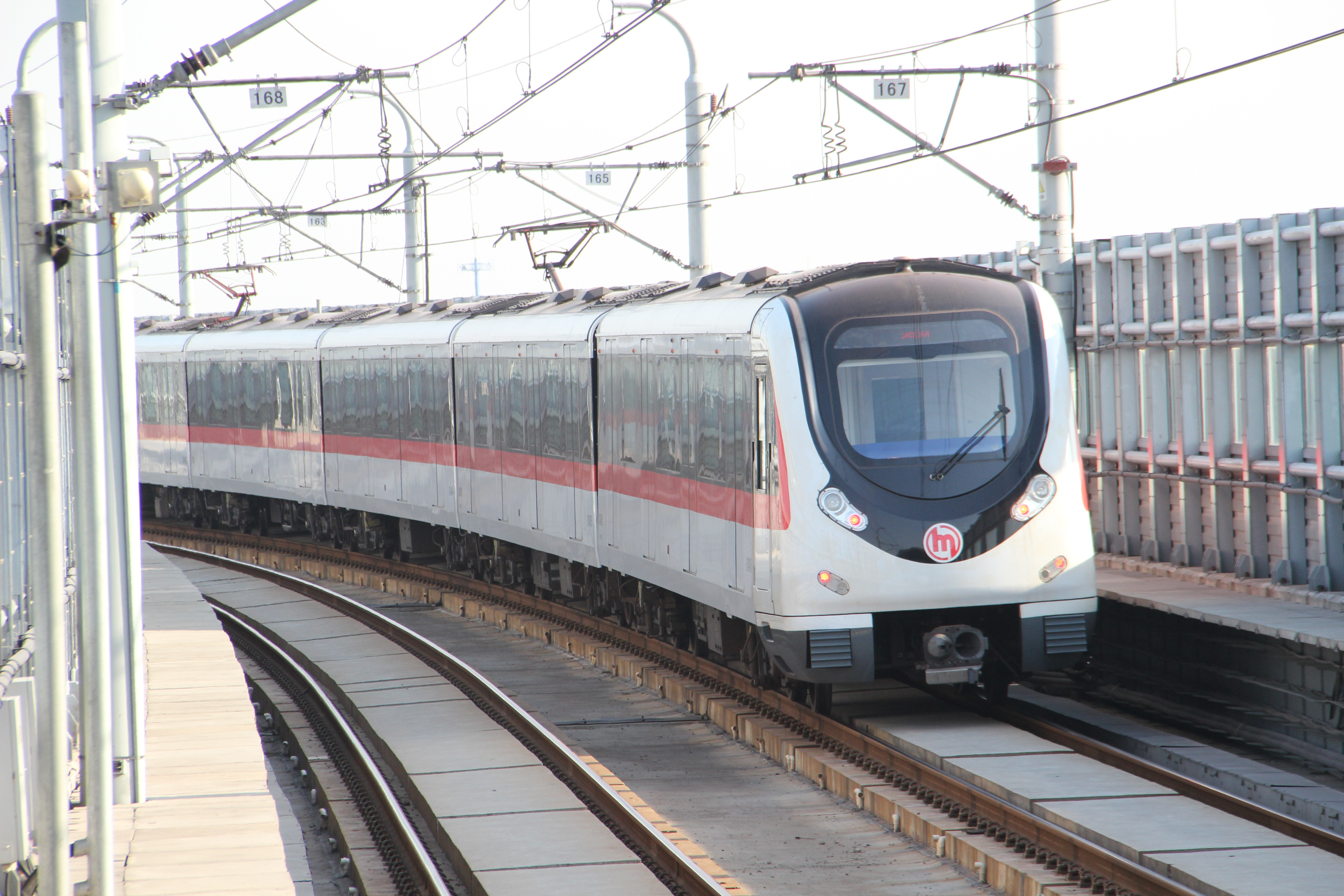

Overview
- Owner: City of Hangzhou
- Locale: Hangzhou, Zhejiang, China
- Transit type: Rapid transit
- Number of lines: 13
- Number of stations: 270
- Daily ridership: 2,461,300 (2021 avg.); 5,815,800 (31 December 2025, Peak)

Operation
- Began operation: November 24, 2012; 13 years ago
- Operators: Hangzhou Metro Corporation (Line 2, Line 3, Line 4, Line 6, Line 7, Line 8, Line 9, Line 10, Line 16, Line 19); MTR Corporation (Hangzhou) (Line 1, Line 5)

Technical
- System length: 516 km (321 mi) (metro lines only, excluding Hanghai line); 562 km (349 mi) (metro + commuter rail, including Hanghai line)
- Track gauge: 1,435 mm (4 ft 8 1/2 in)
System map
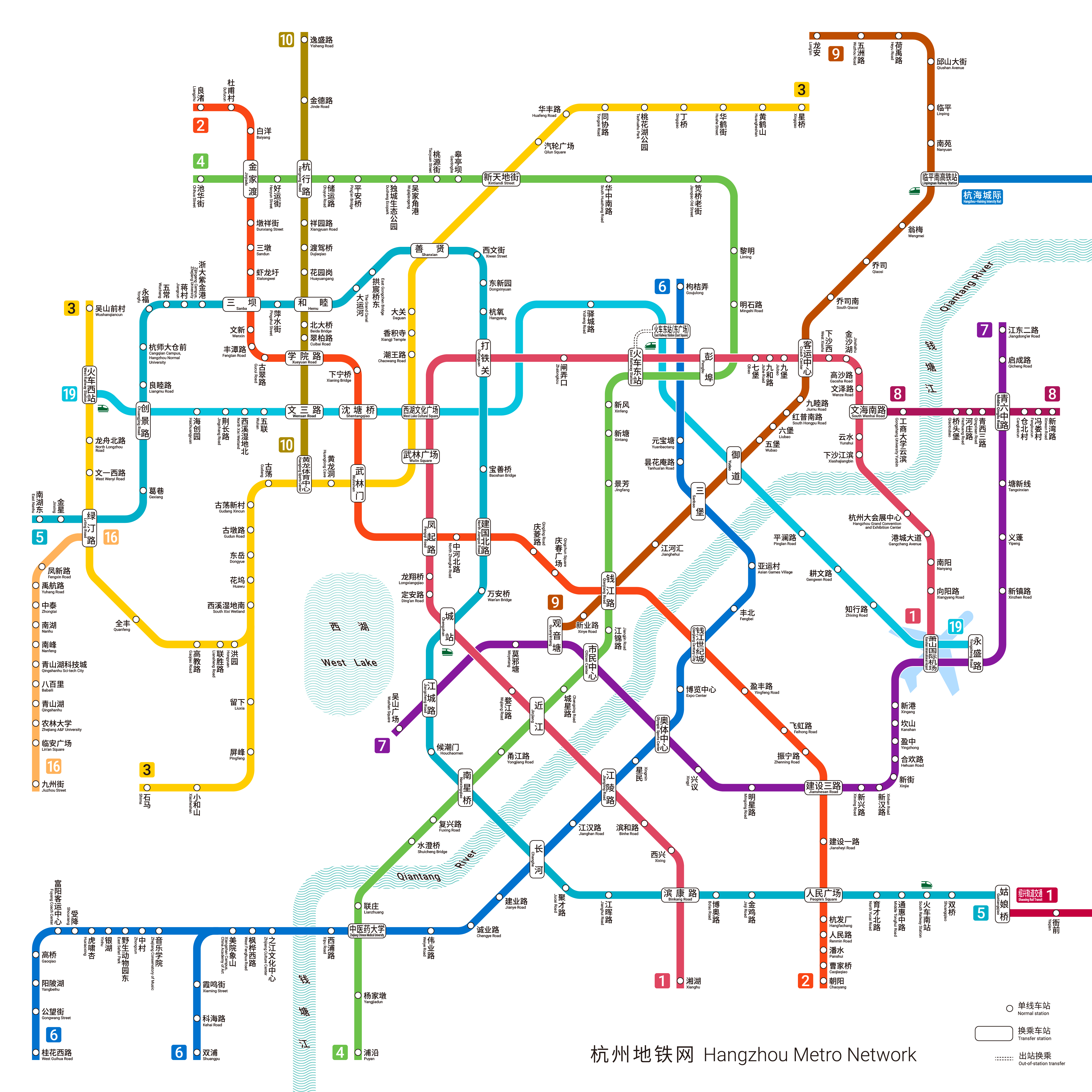

Hangzhou Metro
- Simplified Chinese: 杭州地铁
- Traditional Chinese: 杭州地鐵
Transcriptions
Standard Mandarin
- Hanyu Pinyin: Hángzhōu Dìtiě
Wu
- Romanization: hhaan tseu di thiq

The Hangzhou Metro (Chinese: 杭州地铁) is a rapid transit system that serves Hangzhou, the capital city of Zhejiang province, China. The system opened on November 24, 2012. It is the 17th city in China to operate a rapid transit system.

== Network ==
There are currently 12 lines in operation. The adjacent Shaoxing Metro connects the system at Guniangqiao station on Line 5, and the Hangzhou-Haining Intercity Rail connects to the system at Linpingnan Railway Station on Line 9.

- Line 1 is an arc-shaped line. It begins at Xianghu in Xiaoshan, stretches across downtown Hangzhou after crossing the Qiantang River and ends at Hangzhou Xiaoshan Int'l Airport. It connects West Lake, Hangzhou Railway Station, Hangzhou East Railway Station, Xiasha Higher Education Park and the Airport. It used to have a branch line to Linping District, which became part of Line 9 in July 2021.
- Line 2 links the Xiaoshan Industrial Park with Qianjiang Century City, Downtown Hangzhou and Liangzhu in Yuhang District. It runs in northwest–southeast direction.
- Line 3 begins in Xingqiao subdistrict in Linping District, runs in northeast–southwest direction and terminates at Wushanqiancun, North of Hangzhou West Railway Station. A branch commence near Xixi Wetland and connects Xiaoheshan Higher Education Park.
- Line 4 is a hook-shaped line that stretching from Puyan to Chihua Street in north Sandunzhen in Xihu District. It connects Puyan, West Lake scenic area south, Qianjiang New City, Hangzhou East Railway Station and several residential areas in the north part of the city.
- Line 5 is a Z-shaped line stretching from Future Sci-Tech City in Yuhang District, passing multiple areas in the downtown and ends near the Hangzhou-Shaoxing city limit. It provides multiple points of transfer and it is one of the busiest lines in the system, serving more than 500,000 passengers per day. It connects to Line 1 of the Shaoxing Metro.
- Line 6 connects Fuyang District with Olympic Sports Park, Qianjiang Century City, Asian Games Village and the Hangzhou East Railway Station. It is one of two metro lines linking the main venue of 2022 Asian Games.
- Line 7 links the West Lake with Qianjiang New City, Olympic Sports Park, Hangzhou Xiaoshan Int'l Airport and Dajiangdong Industrial Park.
- Line 8 provides a link between Xiasha Higher Education Park and Dajiangdong Industrial Park.
- Line 9 provides a link between Qianjiang New City and Linping District. It connects to the Hangzhou–Haining Intercity Rail. The section between Linping and Coach Center was part of Line 1 until July 10, 2021.
- Line 10 provides a North–South link between Huanglong Sports Center and Renhe subdistrict in Yuhang. It plans to connect Hangzhou-Deqing Intercity Rail in the future.
- Line 16 is an express metro line linking Lin'an District with Yuhang District.
- Line 19 is an express metro line linking Hangzhou West Railway Station, Hangzhou East Railway Station and Hangzhou Xiaoshan International Airport.

The Hangzhou Metro has the only metro system map in China whose first seven lines follow the hue order of the rainbow colors.

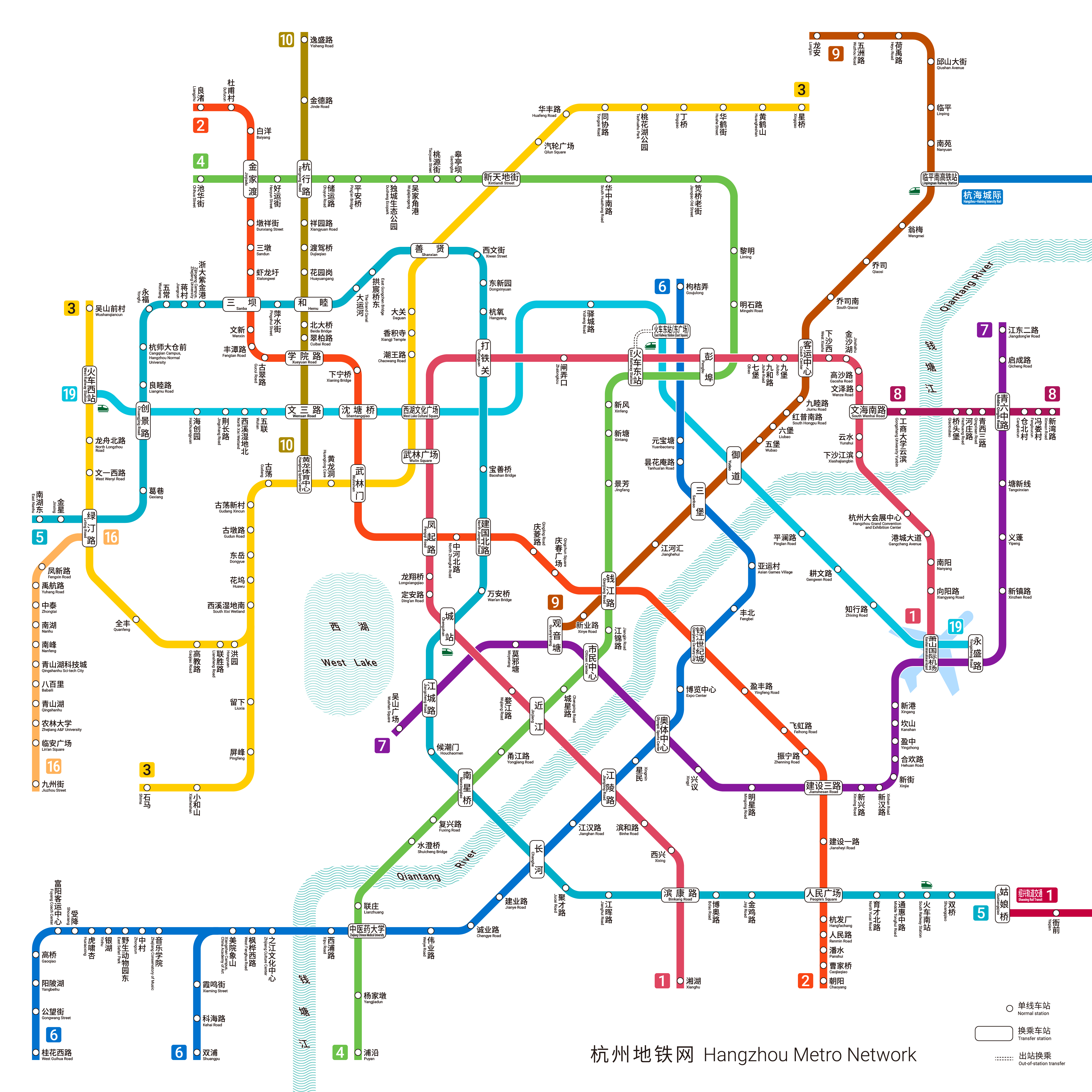
Hangzhou Metro Map

=== Lines ===
Line	Terminals (District)		Commencement	Newest Extension	Length km	Stations	Operator
	Xianghu (Xiaoshan)	Xiaoshan International Airport (Xiaoshan)	November 24, 2012	December 30, 2020	53.1	33	
	Chaoyang (Xiaoshan)	Liangzhu (Yuhang)	November 24, 2014	December 27, 2017	43.3	33	
	Xingqiao (Linping)	Wushanqiancun (Yuhang) Shima (Xihu)	February 21, 2022	September 22, 2022	57.5	37	
	Chihua Street (Xihu)	Puyan (Binjiang)	February 2, 2015	February 21, 2022	46.8	32	
	East Nanhu (Yuhang)	Guniangqiao (Xiaoshan)	June 24, 2019	January 1, 2025	56.0	40	
	Goujulong (Shangcheng)	West Guihua Road (Fuyang); Shuangpu (Xihu)	December 30, 2020	November 6, 2021	58.5	34	
	Jiangdong'er Road (Qiantang)	Wushan Square (Shangcheng)	December 30, 2020	April 1, 2022	47.5	24	
	South Wenhai Road (Qiantang)	Xinwan Road (Qiantang)	June 28, 2021	–	17.2	9	
	Guanyintang (Shangcheng)	Long'an (Linping)	July 10, 2021	April 1, 2022	29.5	19	
	Yisheng Road (Yuhang)	Huanglong Sports Center (Xihu)	February 21, 2022	September 22, 2022	14.7	12	
	Lvting Road (Yuhang)	Jiuzhou Street (Lin'an)	April 23, 2020	–	35.1	12	
	West Railway Station (Yuhang)	Yongsheng Road (Xiaoshan)	September 22, 2022	–	59.14	17 (Note: Includes unopened station Jingchang Road. Excludes unopened Tiaoxi to the west.)	
Total					516	300	

== History ==
=== Initial plans ===
The planning for a metro system in the city started in the 1990s and was about to start construction works in September 2003, but the State Council suspended construction works due to increasing costs. The state council approved the construction and operation of a rapid transit system by the Hangzhou Subway Group Co. Ltd in Hangzhou on June 5, 2005. The preliminary design for the first line, Line 1, was approved on January 11, 2007, by the Development and Reform Commission after four days of study. It would be 47.97 km (29.81 mi) long, of which 41.36 km (25.70 mi) is underground, 6.14 km (3.82 mi) elevated, and 0.47 km (0.29 mi) at grade.

=== Construction ===
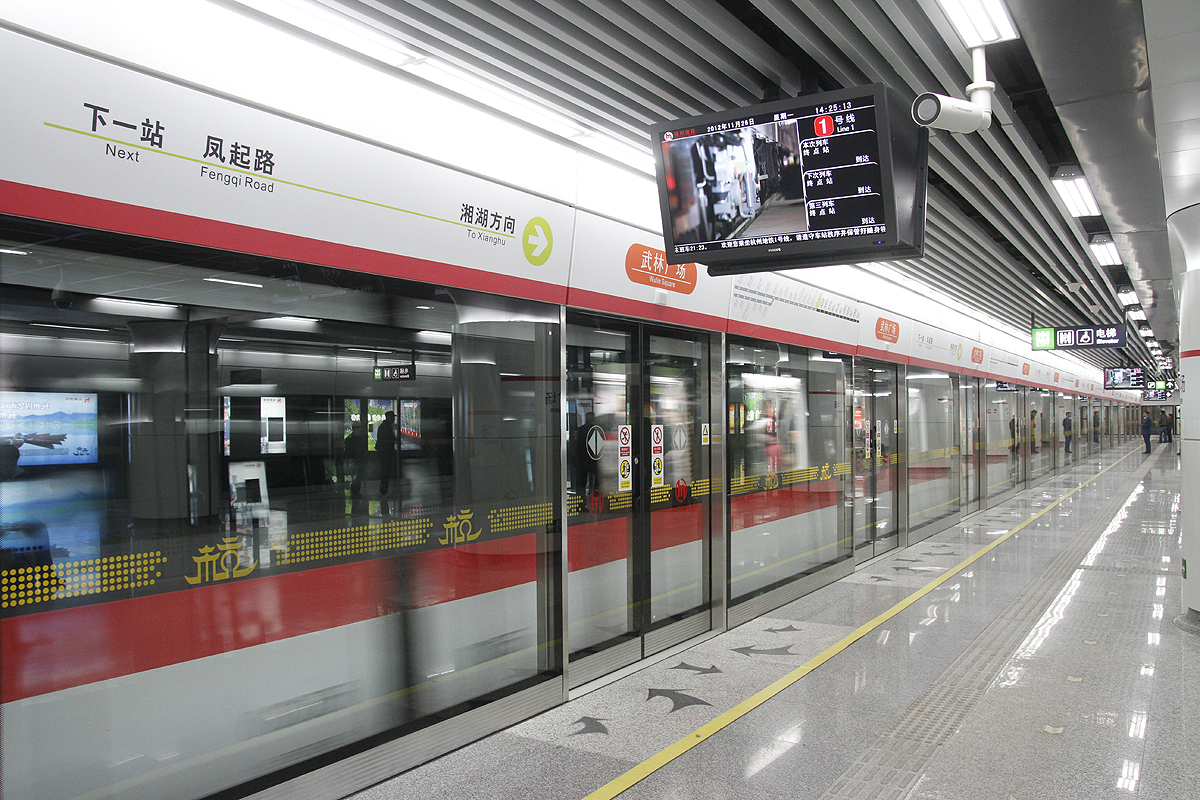
Wulin Square station

Evolution of the network

Construction of the first phase of Hangzhou Metro Line 1 began on March 28, 2007, with subsequent phases beginning later in that year. The first phase included three underground stations in Qianjiang New City. Jiubao East Station is the biggest station along Line 1 and will be a hub for the future metro system and other forms of public transport. The funding of Line 1 came from both the city government and the banks, with 10.2 billion yuan and 5 billion yuan respectively. The first phase construction was estimated to be 45 billion yuan.

In January 2009, it was announced that MTR Corporation would invest in a 22 billion-yuan ($3.2 billion) / 25-year / 49% share joint venture with the Hangzhou government to operate Line 1 of the metro.

The first section of Line 4 opened for trial operation on February 2, 2015.

In December 2016, the National Development and Reform Commission approved the planning for 10 lines, including extensions to the three existing lines, scheduled to open in time for the 2022 Asian Games. By then the Hangzhou Metro network is projected to be 446 km (277.13 mi) long. As of 2018 there are over 300 km (186.41 mi) of subway lines under construction in Hangzhou.

=== Accident ===
On November 15, 2008, a 75-metre (246 ft 1 in) section of the tunnel near Fengqing Avenue in Xiaoshan District collapsed while under construction, killing 17 people.

== Future expansions ==

=== Under construction ===
Years	Lines	Section	Terminals		Length (km)	Stations	Notes & References
2026	Hangde	Phase I	Renhe North	Deqing High-speed Railway Station	25.9	9	

=== Phase IV Expansion ===
On November 14, 2022 the NDRC approved the 4th Phase Expansion plan consisting of 152.9 km of new lines.

Years	Line	Length km	Stations	Notes
Before 2027	3 Phase II	7.5	5	Under Construction
Before 2027	4 Phase III West	5	4	Under Construction
Before 2027	4 Phase III South	5	5	Under Construction
Before 2027	9 Phase II	10.1	7	Under Construction
Before 2027	10 Phase II	5.8	3	Under Construction
Before 2027	10 Phase III	5	2	
Before 2027	12 Phase I North	24.3	14	Under Construction
Before 2027	12 Phase I South	1.7	1	Under Construction
Before 2027	15 Phase I	40.5	30	Under Construction
Before 2027	18 Phase I	48	19	Under Construction
Total		152.9	90	
