= Xihu, Hangzhou =

Xihu 西湖区
- District
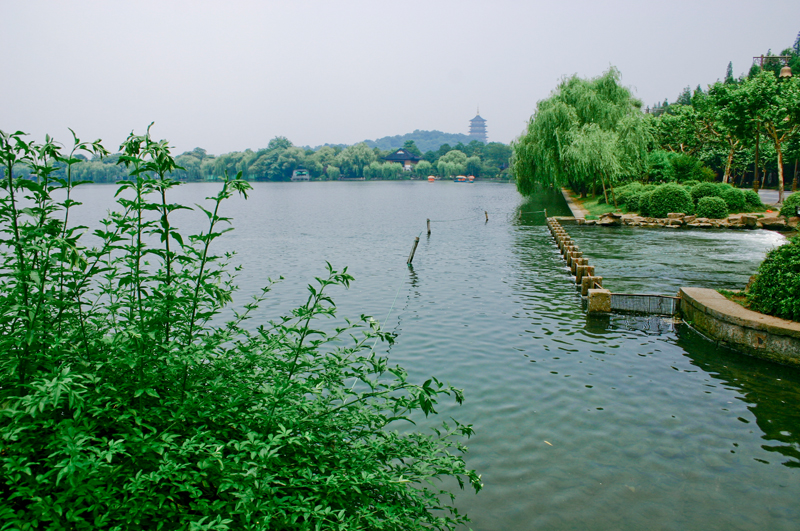

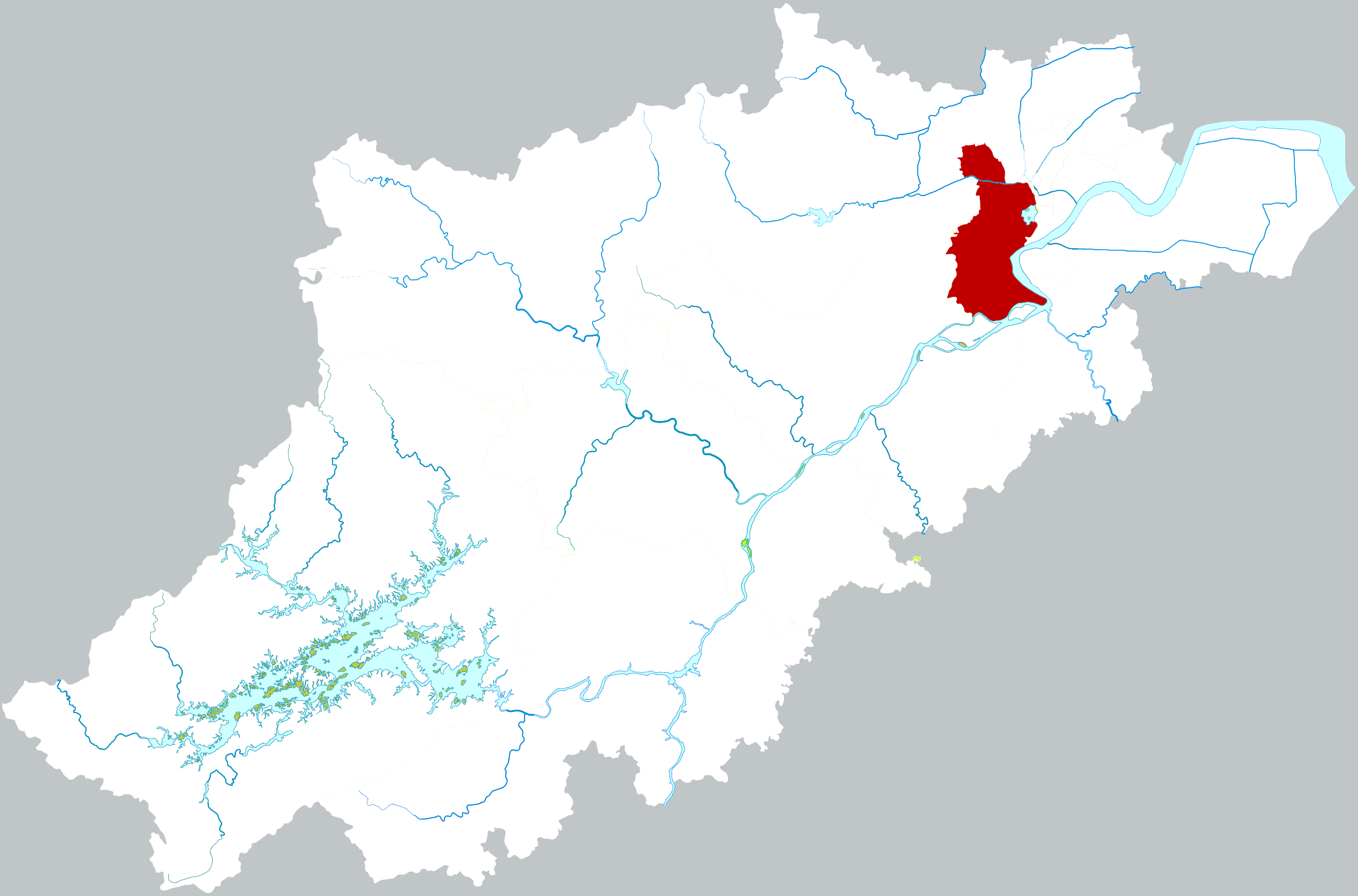
- Location of Xihu District within Hangzhou

- Location in Zhejiang
- Coordinates: 30°16′N 120°08′E
- Country: People's Republic of China
- Province: Zhejiang
- Sub-provincial city: Hangzhou

Area
  - Total: 312.43 km^{2} (120.63 sq mi)

Population
  - Total: 544,600
  - Density: 1,743/km^{2} (4,515/sq mi)
- Time zone: UTC+8 (China Standard)
- Website: www.hzxh.gov.cn

Xihu District (Chinese: 西湖区; pinyin: Xīhú Qū) is an urban district of Hangzhou, Zhejiang, China. It was named after West Lake, which is in its jurisdiction.

== Administrative divisions ==
Subdistricts:

- Beishan Subdistrict (北山街道), Lingyin Subdistrict (灵隐街道), Xixi Subdistrict (西溪街道), Cuiyuan Subdistrict (翠苑街道), Wenxin Subdistrict (文新街道), Gudang Subdistrict (古荡街道), Xihu Subdistrict (西湖街道), Zhuantang Subdistrict (转塘街道), Jiangcun Subdistrict (蒋村街道), Liuxia Subdistrict (留下街道)

Towns:

- Shuangpu (双浦镇), Sandun (三墩镇)
