= Datieguan station =

Hangzhou Metro station

Datieguan 打铁关
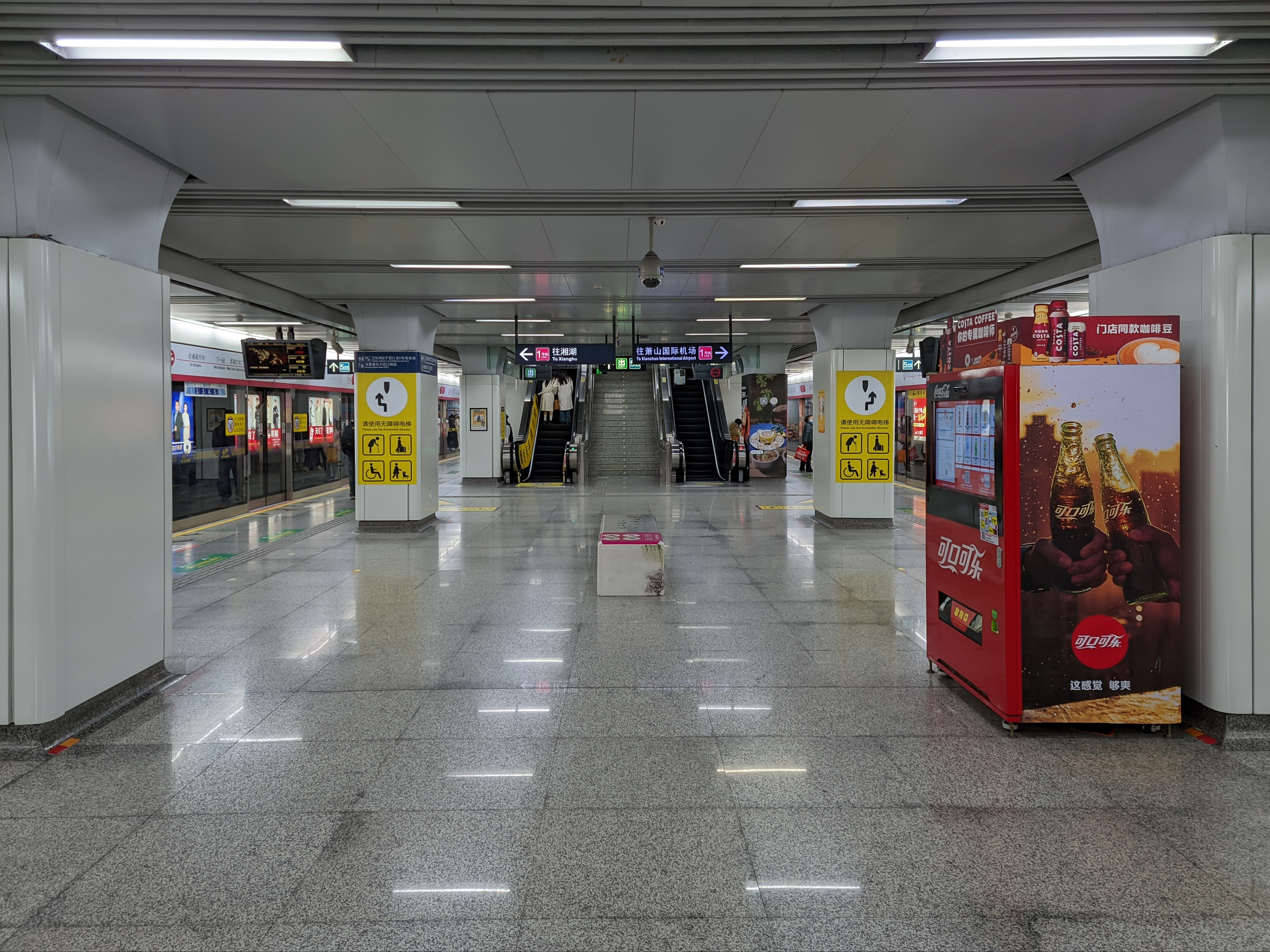
- Platforms for Line 1

General information
- Location: Dongxin Road × Tongsheng Alley; Gongshu District, Hangzhou, Zhejiang; China
- Coordinates: 30.287836°N 120.172178°E
- System: Hangzhou metro station
- Operator: Hangzhou MTR Corporation; Hangzhou MTR Line 5 Corporation
- Lines: Line 1; Line 5
- Platforms: 4 (2 island platforms)

Construction
- Structure type: Underground
- Accessible: Yes

Other information
- Station code: DTG

History
- Opened: 24 November 2012; 13 years ago (Line 1); 23 April 2020; 6 years ago (Line 5)

Services
Preceding station	Hangzhou Metro	Following station
West Lake Cultural Square towards Xianghu	Line 1	Zhalongkou towards Xiaoshan International Airport
Hangyang towards East Nanhu	Line 5	Baoshan Bridge towards Guniangqiao
Location

Datieguan (simplified Chinese: 打铁关; traditional Chinese: 打鐵關) is a station on Line 1 and Line 5 of the Hangzhou Metro in China. It was opened in November 2012, together with the rest of the stations on Line 1. The Line 5 began its service on 23 April 2020. It is located in the Gongshu District of Hangzhou.

== Station layout ==
Datieguan has three levels: a concourse, and separate levels for lines 1 and 5. Basement 2 is for line 1, and basement 3 is for line 5. Each of these consists of an island platform with two tracks.

== Entrances/exits ==
- A: Datieguan Xincun Community
- B: Soho City
- C: Wenhui Rd.
- E1 & E2: east side of Dongxin Road
- F: west side of Dongxin Road

== Gallery ==
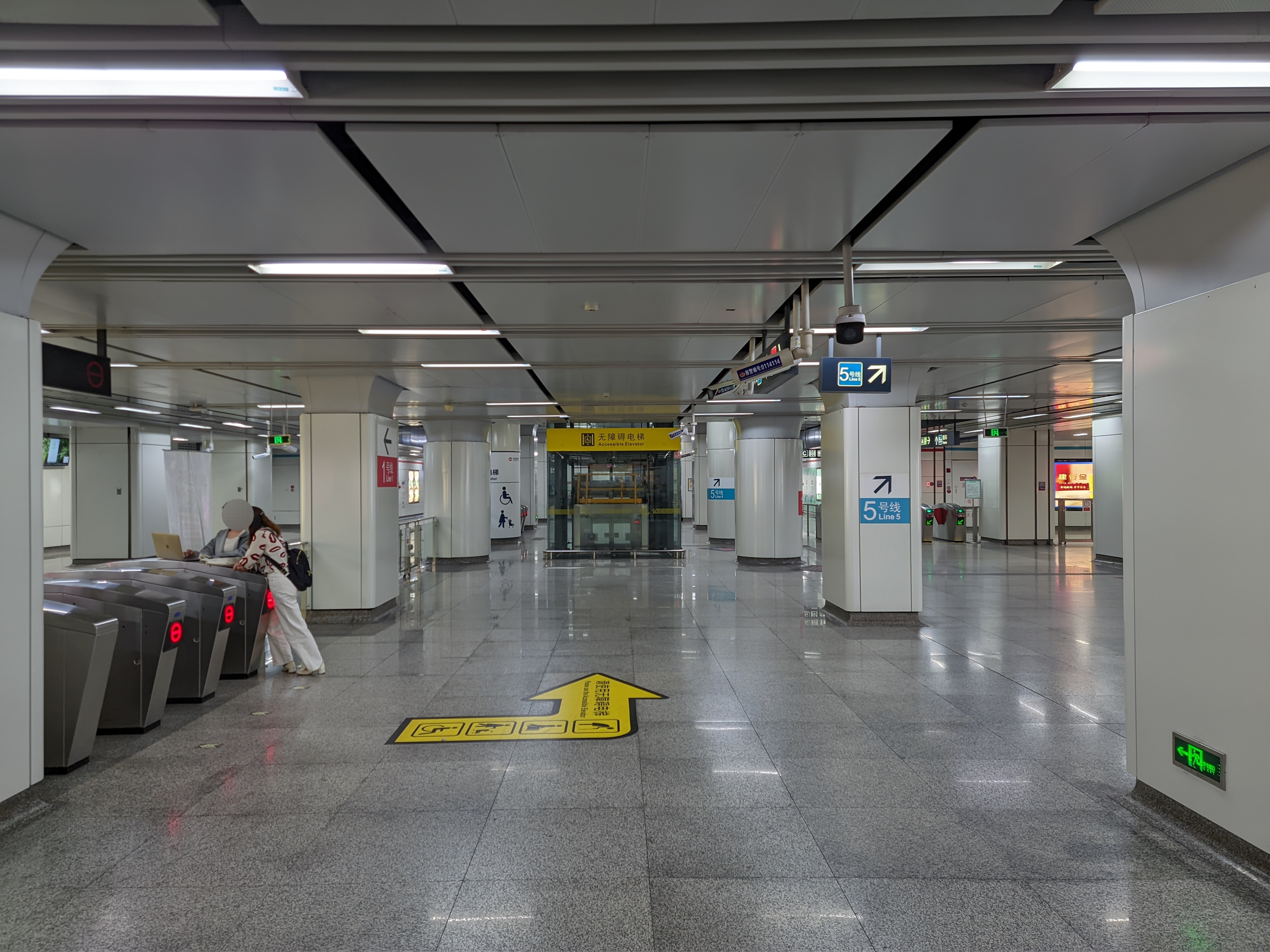
Concourse

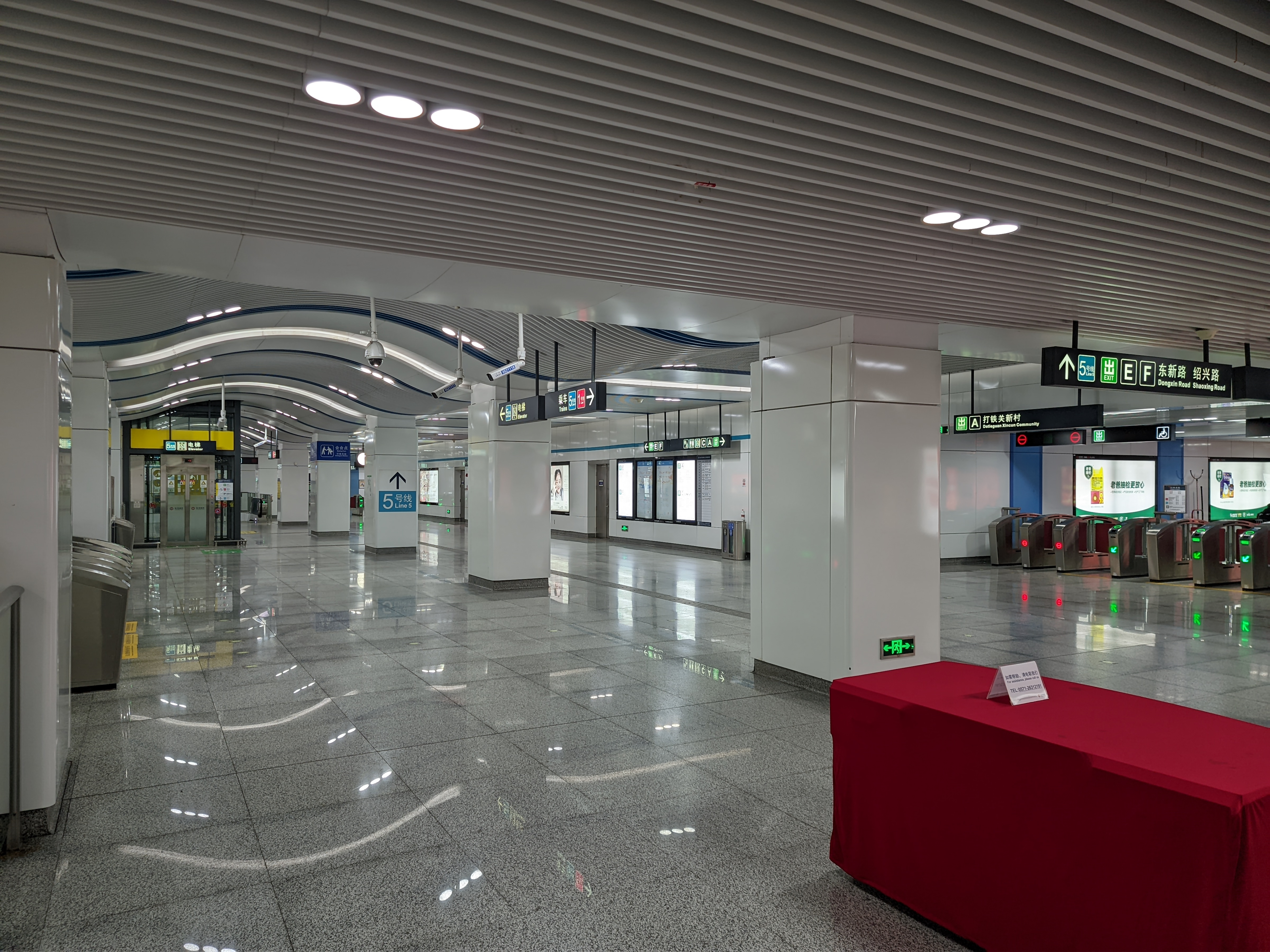
Concourse

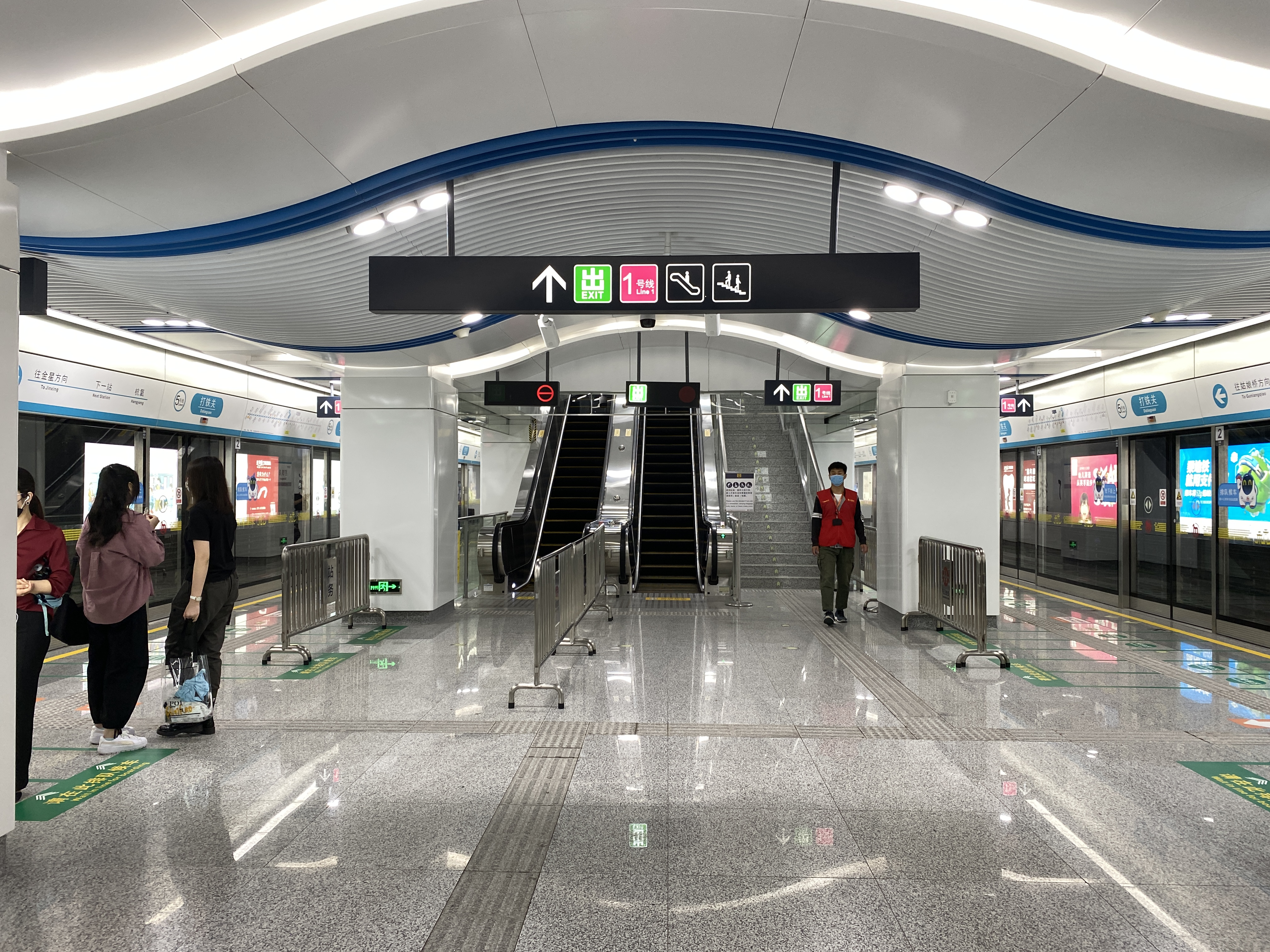
Line 5 Platforms

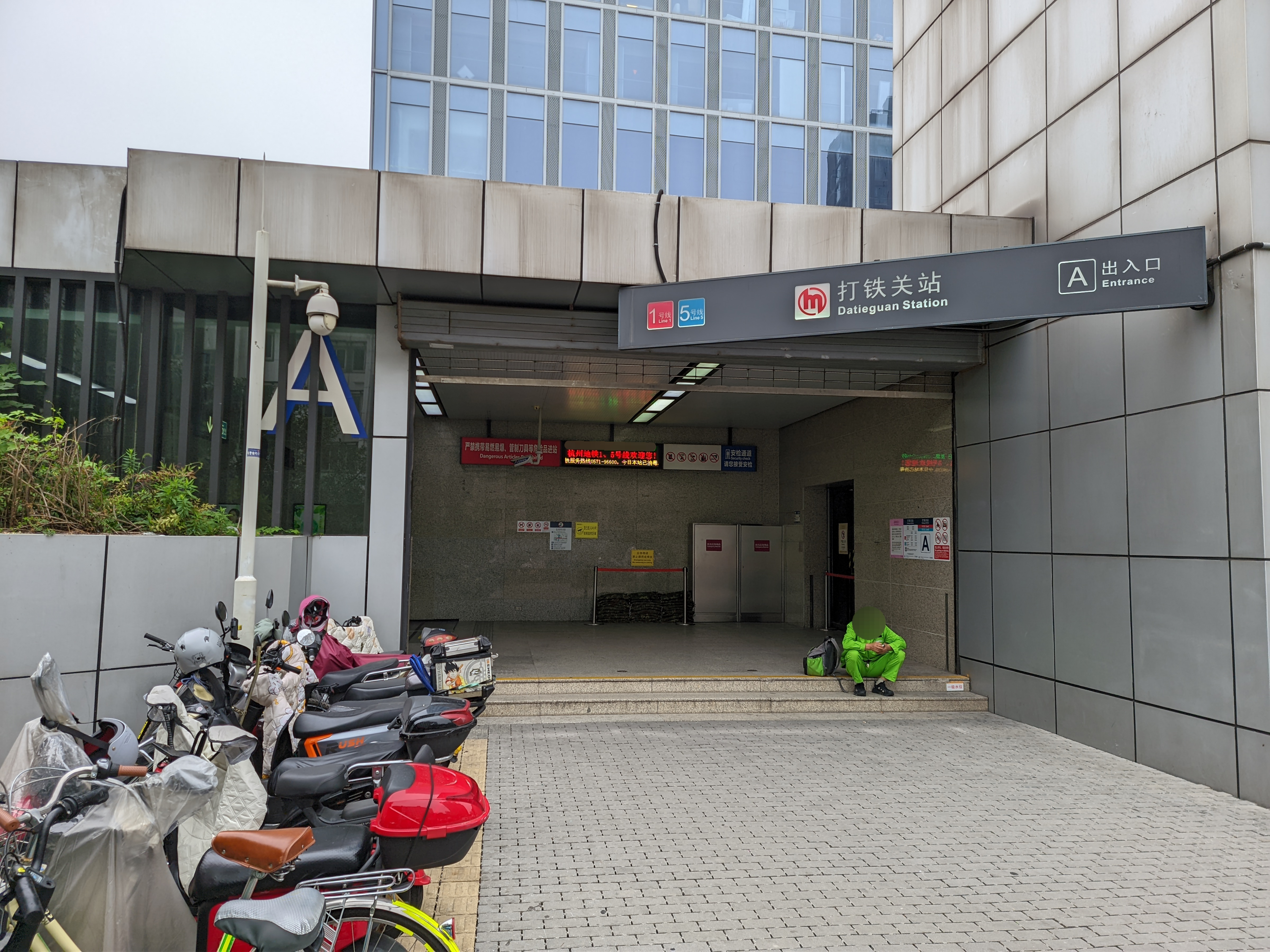
Entrance A
