= Dujiaqiao station =

Metro station in Hangzhou, China

Dujiaqiao 渡驾桥
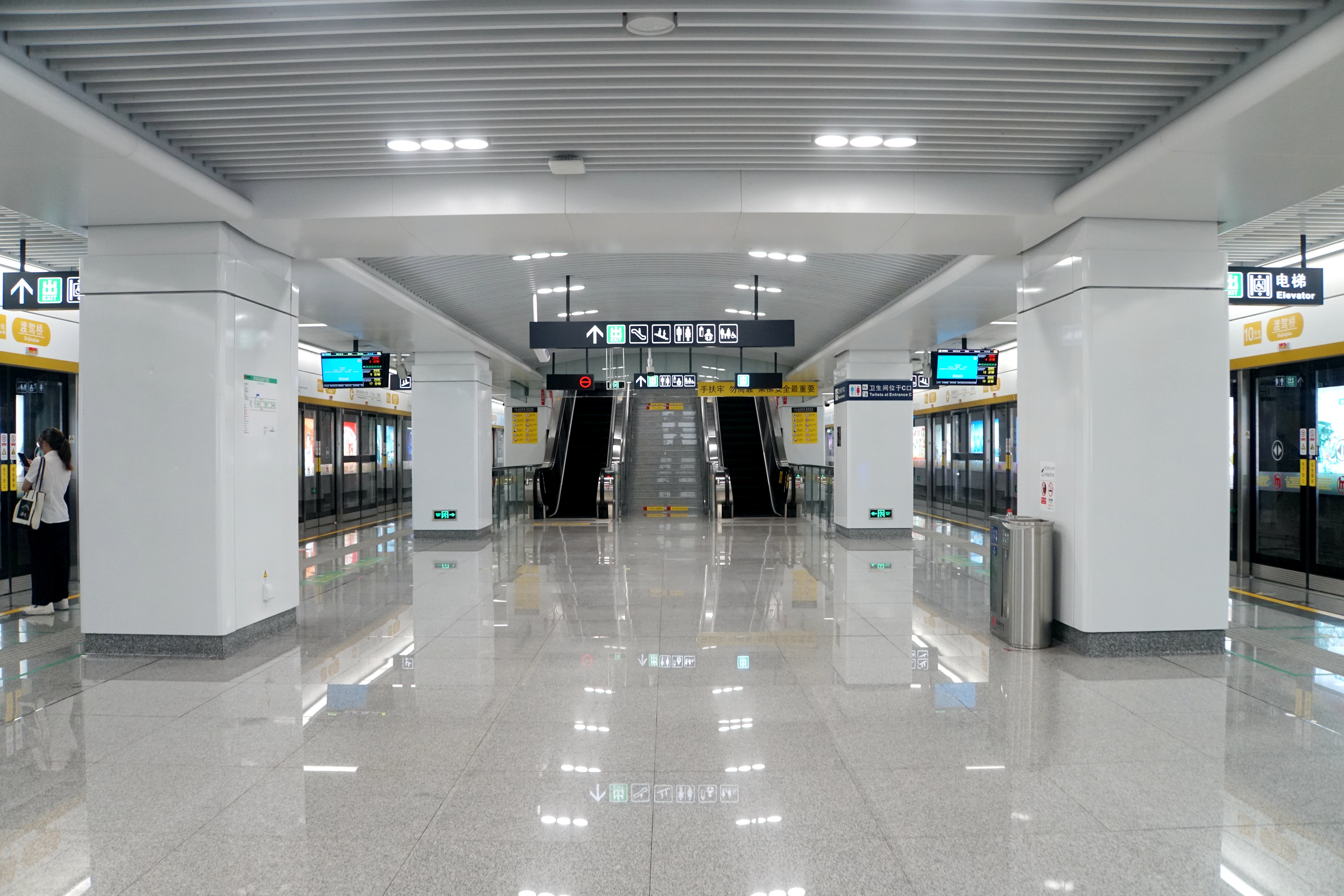
- Platforms

General information
- Location: Shixiang Road; Gongshu District, Hangzhou, Zhejiang; China
- Coordinates: 30°19′38″N 120°06′39″E
- System: Hangzhou metro station
- Operator: Hangzhou Metro Corporation
- Line: Line 10
- Platforms: 2 (1 island platform)

Construction
- Structure type: Underground
- Accessible: Yes

History
- Opened: 21 February 2022

Services
| Preceding station | Hangzhou Metro | Following station |
|---|---|---|
| Huayuangang towards Huanglong Sports Center | Line 10 | Xiangyuan Road towards Yisheng Road |
Location

Dujiaqiao (simplified Chinese: 渡驾桥; traditional Chinese: 渡駕橋) is a metro station of Line 10 of the Hangzhou Metro in China. It is located in Gongshu District of Hangzhou. The station was opened on 21 February 2022.

== Station layout ==
Dujiaqiao has two levels: a concourse, and an island platform with two tracks for line 10.

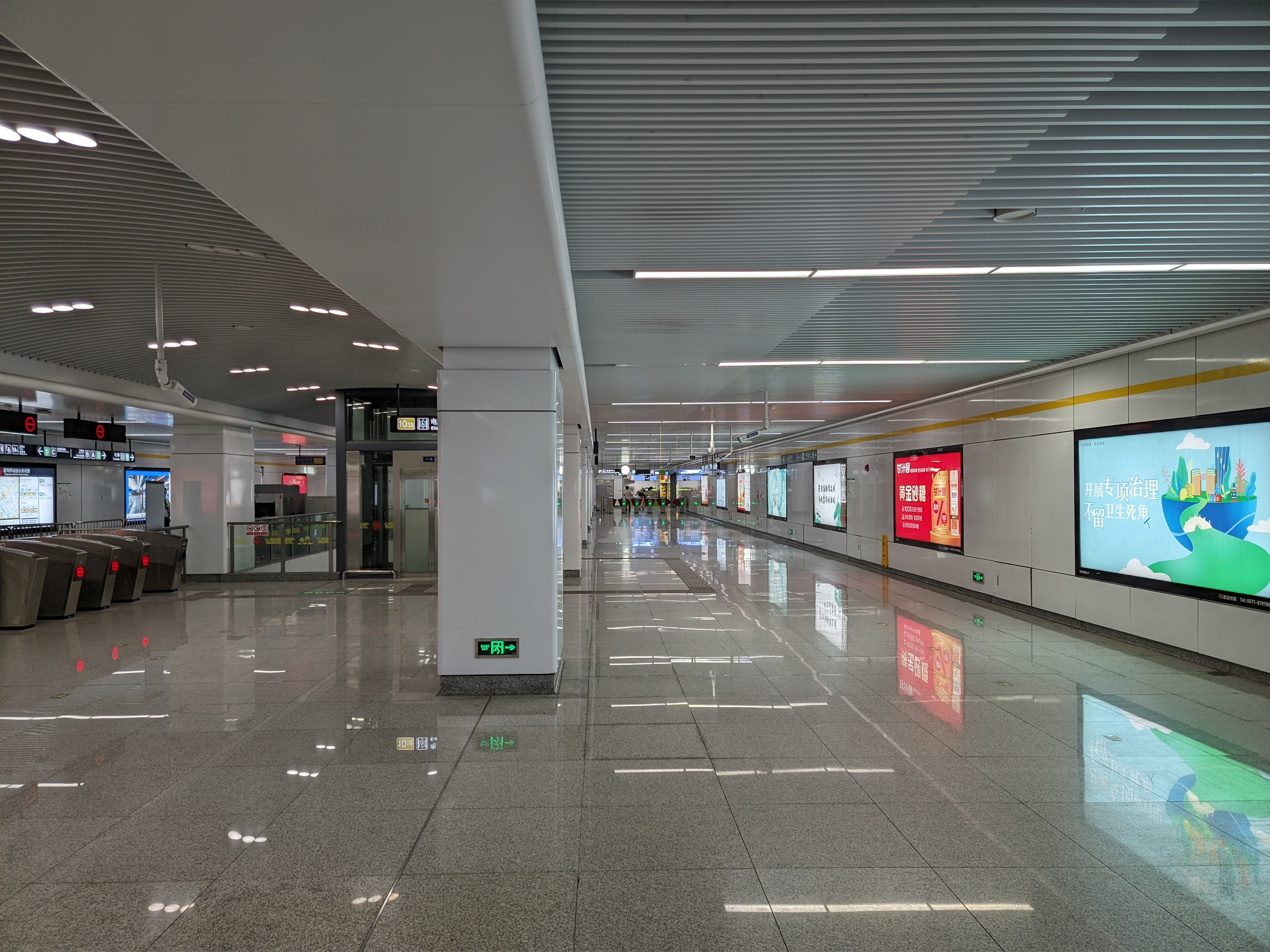
Concourse

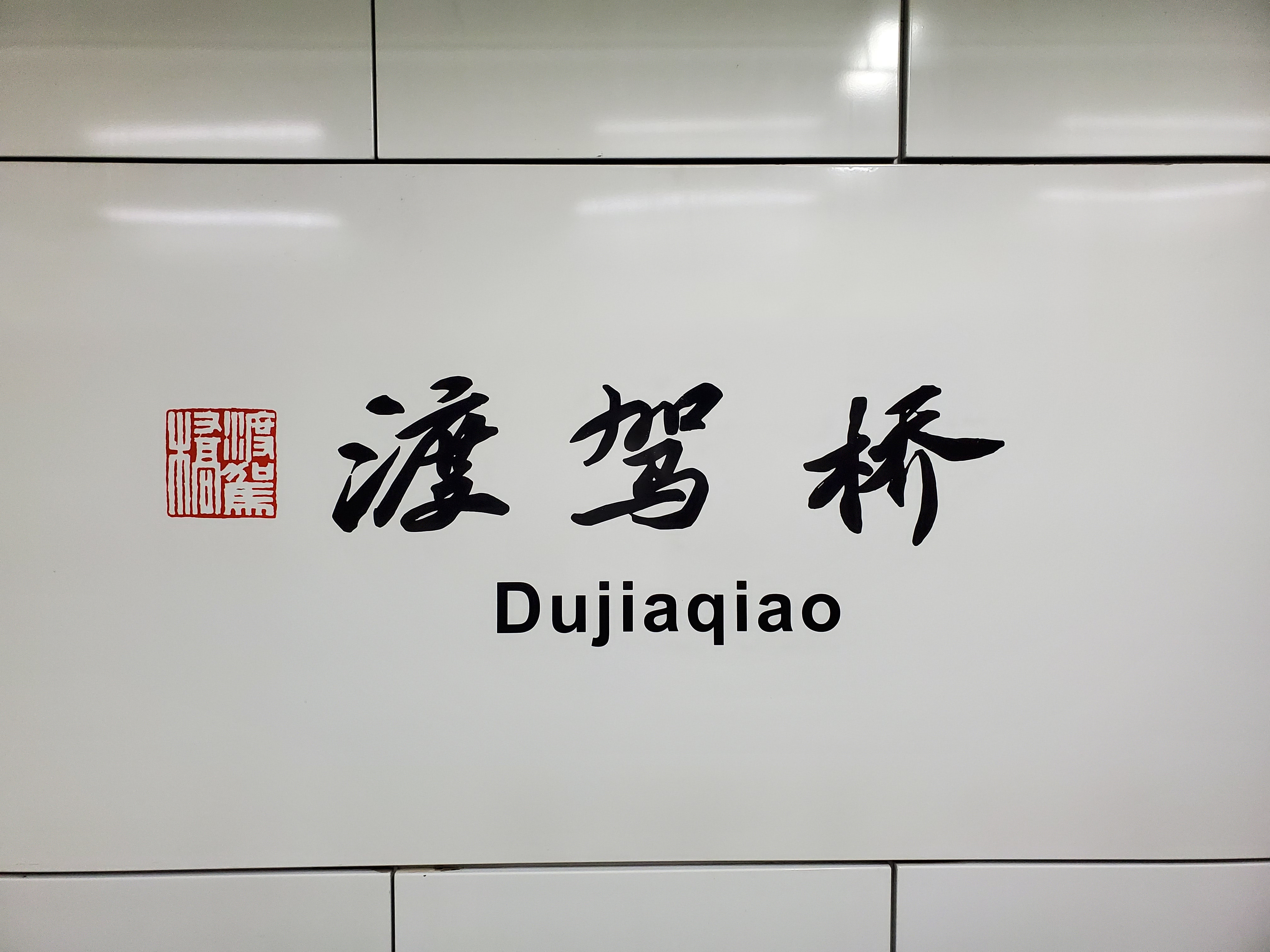
Station name in Chinese calligraphy

== Entrances/exits ==
- A: Hangzhou International Convention and Exhibition Center, Haiwaihai Hangzhou Auto Mall
- B: Mid Town
- C: south side of Shixiang Road
