= Xiangyuan Road station =

Metro station in Hangzhou, China

Xiangyuan Road 祥园路
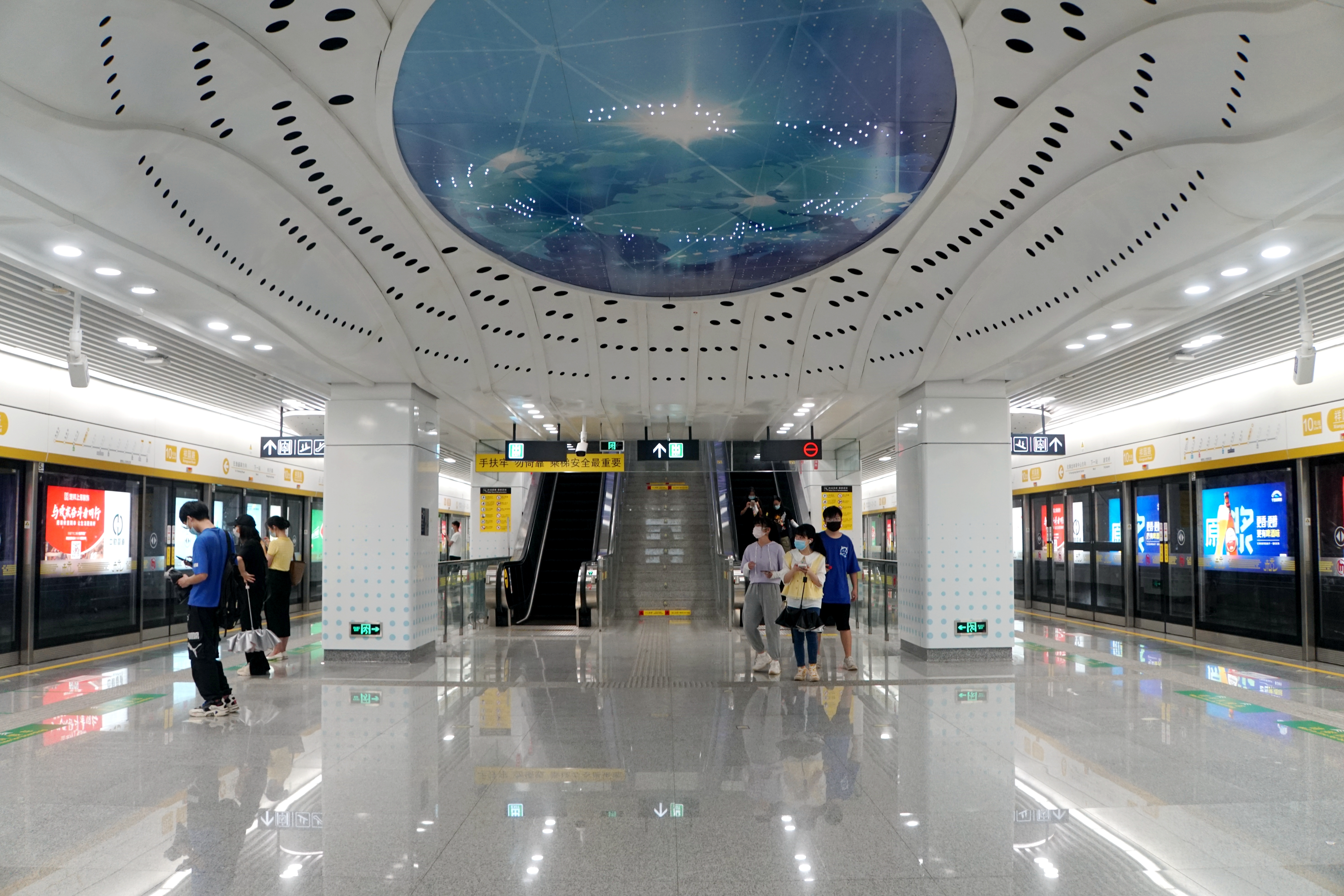
- Platforms

General information
- Location: Hangxing Road × Xiangyuan Road; Gongshu District, Hangzhou, Zhejiang; China
- Coordinates: 30°20′21″N 120°06′42″E
- System: Hangzhou metro station
- Operator: Hangzhou Metro Corporation
- Line: Line 10
- Platforms: 2 (1 island platform)

Construction
- Structure type: Underground
- Accessible: Yes

History
- Opened: 21 February 2022

Services
Preceding station	Hangzhou Metro	Following station
Dujiaqiao towards Huanglong Sports Center	Line 10	Hangxing Road towards Yisheng Road
Location

Xiangyuan Road (simplified Chinese: 祥园路; traditional Chinese: 祥園路) is a metro station of Line 10 of the Hangzhou Metro in China. It is located in Gongshu District of Hangzhou. The station was opened on 21 February 2022.

== Station layout ==
Xiangyuan Road has two levels: a concourse, and an island platform with two tracks for line 10. It is designed as an interchange station of lines 10 and 14 in the future.

== Design ==
The theme of Xiangyuan Road Station's interior design is "The Light of Technology" (Chinese: “科技之光”) . Design elements are extracted from software structures and code programming, and abstractly applied in the form of mimetic blue lighting and special columns. This reflects Hangzhou's spirit of openness and innovation in the software technology and internet era.

== Entrances/exits ==
- A: east side of Hangxing Road, north side of Xiangyuan Road
- B: west side of Hangxing Road, north side of Xiangyuan Road
- C: west side of Hangxing Road, south side of Xiangyuan Road
- D: east side of Hangxing Road, south side of Xiangyuan Road
