= Xintiandi Street station =

Metro station in China

Xintiandi Street 新天地街
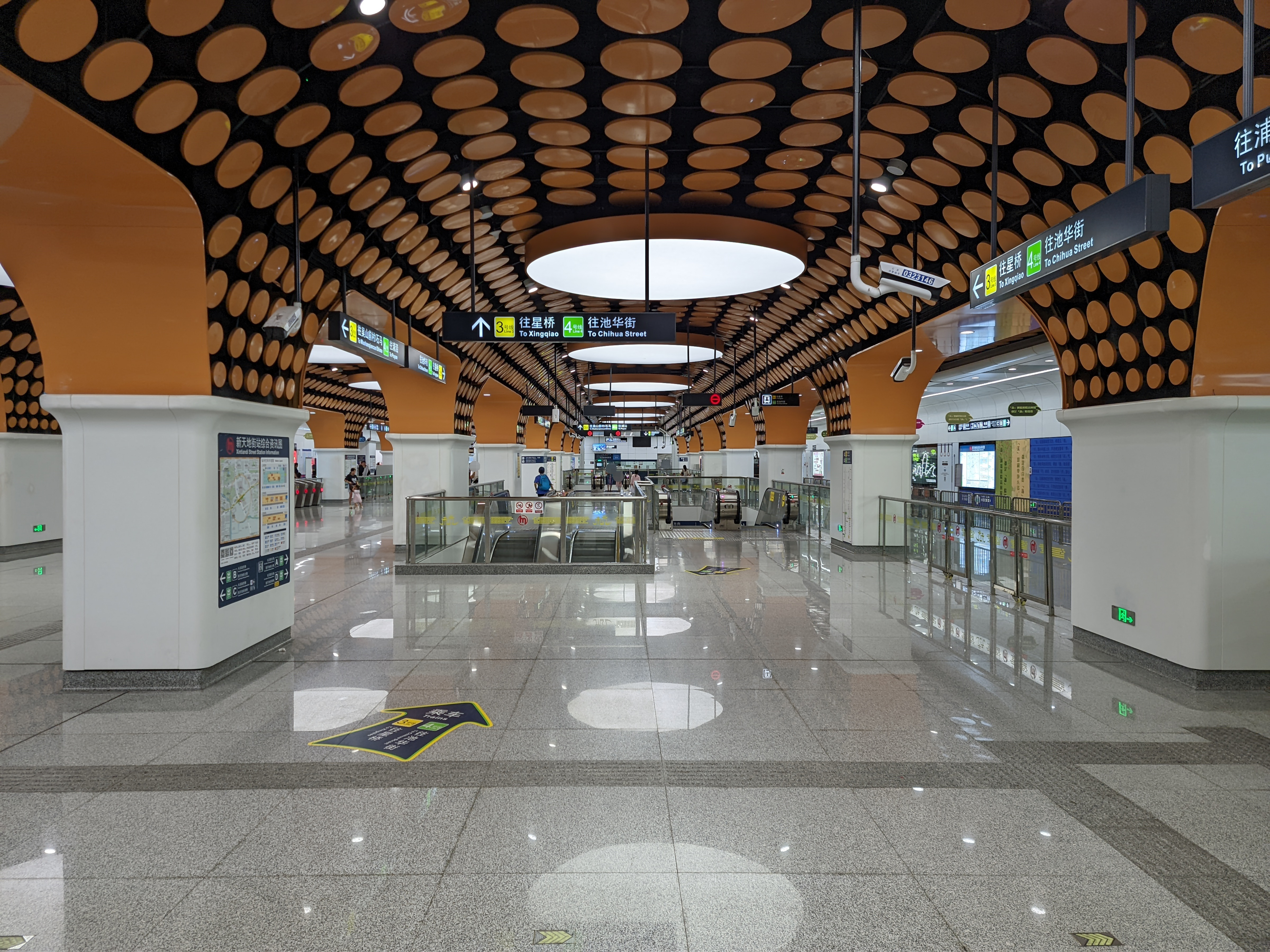
- Concourse

General information
- Location: Xintiandi Street × Changbang Road; Gongshu District, Hangzhou, Zhejiang; China
- Coordinates: 30.3236°N 120.1752°E
- Operated by: Hangzhou Metro Corporation
- Line(s): Line 3 Line 4
- Platforms: 4 (2 island platforms)

Other information
- Station code: XTD

History
- Opened: 21 February 2022

Services
Preceding station	Hangzhou Metro	Following station
Shanxian towards Wushanqiancun or Shima	Line 3	Qilun Square towards Xingqiao
South Huazhong Road towards Puyan	Line 4	Gaotingba towards Chihua Street

Xintiandi Street (Chinese: 新天地街) is a metro station on Line 3 and Line 4 of the Hangzhou Metro in China. It is located in the Gongshu District of Hangzhou. The station was opened on 21 February 2022.

== Station layout ==
The station has two stacked-island platforms that offer a cross-platform interchange between Line 3 and Line 4 in inverse direction. Line 3 uses pair of tracks at the north (upper) side while Line 4 uses tracks at the south (lower) side.

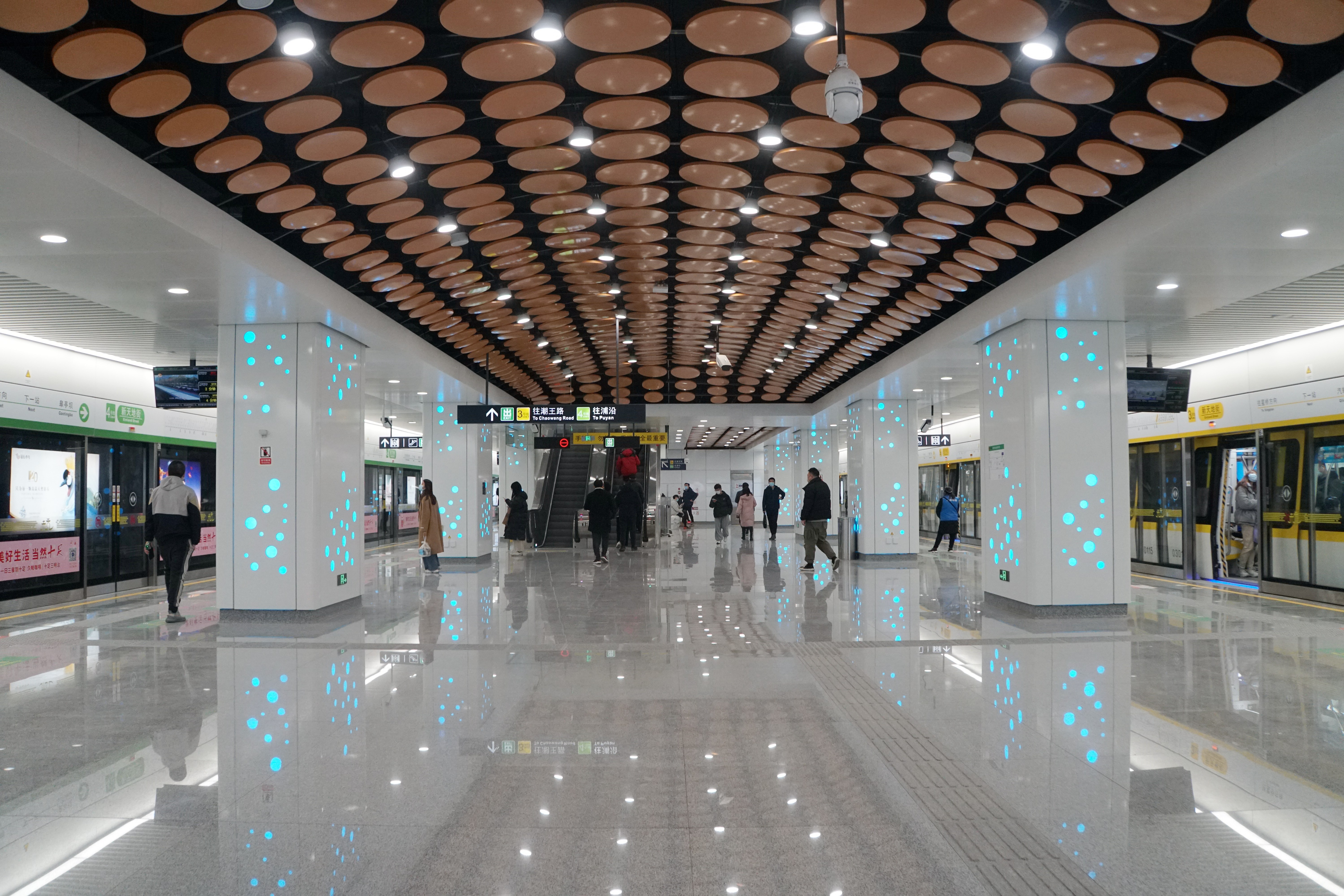
Platform of Line 3 (right) and Line 4 (left)

== Entrances/exits ==
There are five exits.

- A: east side of Changbang Rd., north side of Xintiandi St.
- B_{1}: west side of Changbang Rd., north side of Xintiandi St.
- B_{2}: north side of Xintiandi St.
- C: west side of Changbang Rd., south side of Xintiandi St.
- D: east side of Changbang Rd., south side of Xintiandi St.
