= Huayuangang station =

Metro station in Hangzhou, China

Huayuangang 花园岗
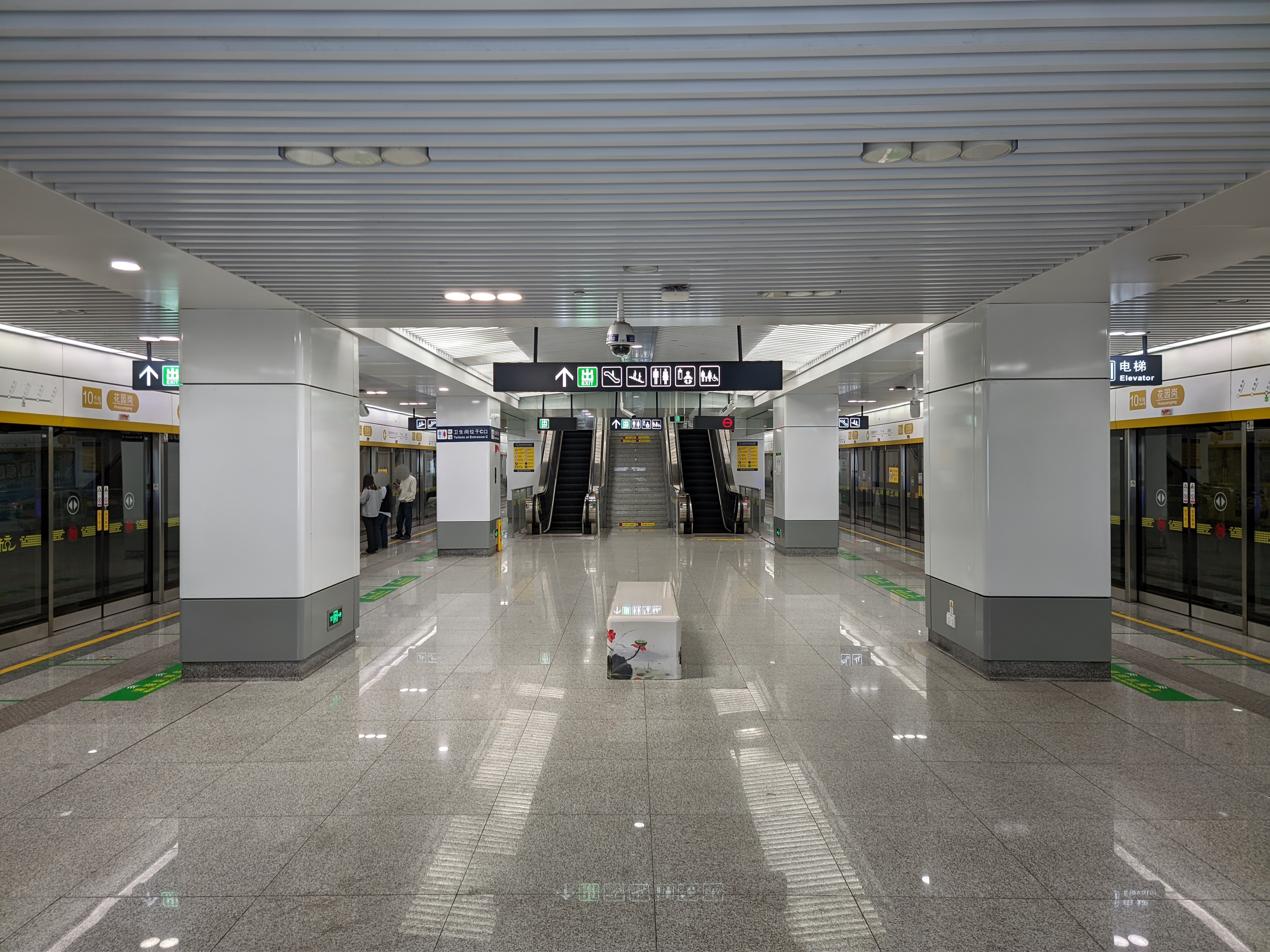
- Platforms

General information
- Location: Moganshan Road × Huayuangang Street; Gongshu District, Hangzhou, Zhejiang; China
- Coordinates: 30.3193°N 120.1070°E
- System: Hangzhou metro station
- Operator: Hangzhou Metro Corporation
- Line: Line 10
- Platforms: 2 (1 island platform)
- Connections: Hangzhou North

Construction
- Structure type: Underground
- Accessible: Yes

History
- Opened: 21 February 2022

Services
Preceding station	Hangzhou Metro	Following station
Hemu towards Huanglong Sports Center	Line 10	Dujiaqiao towards Yisheng Road
Route map
Location

Huayuangang (simplified Chinese: 花园岗; traditional Chinese: 花園崗) is a metro station of Line 10 of the Hangzhou Metro in China. It is located in Gongshu District of Hangzhou. The station was opened on 21 February 2022.

== Station layout ==
Huayuangang has two levels: a concourse, and an island platform with two tracks for line 10.

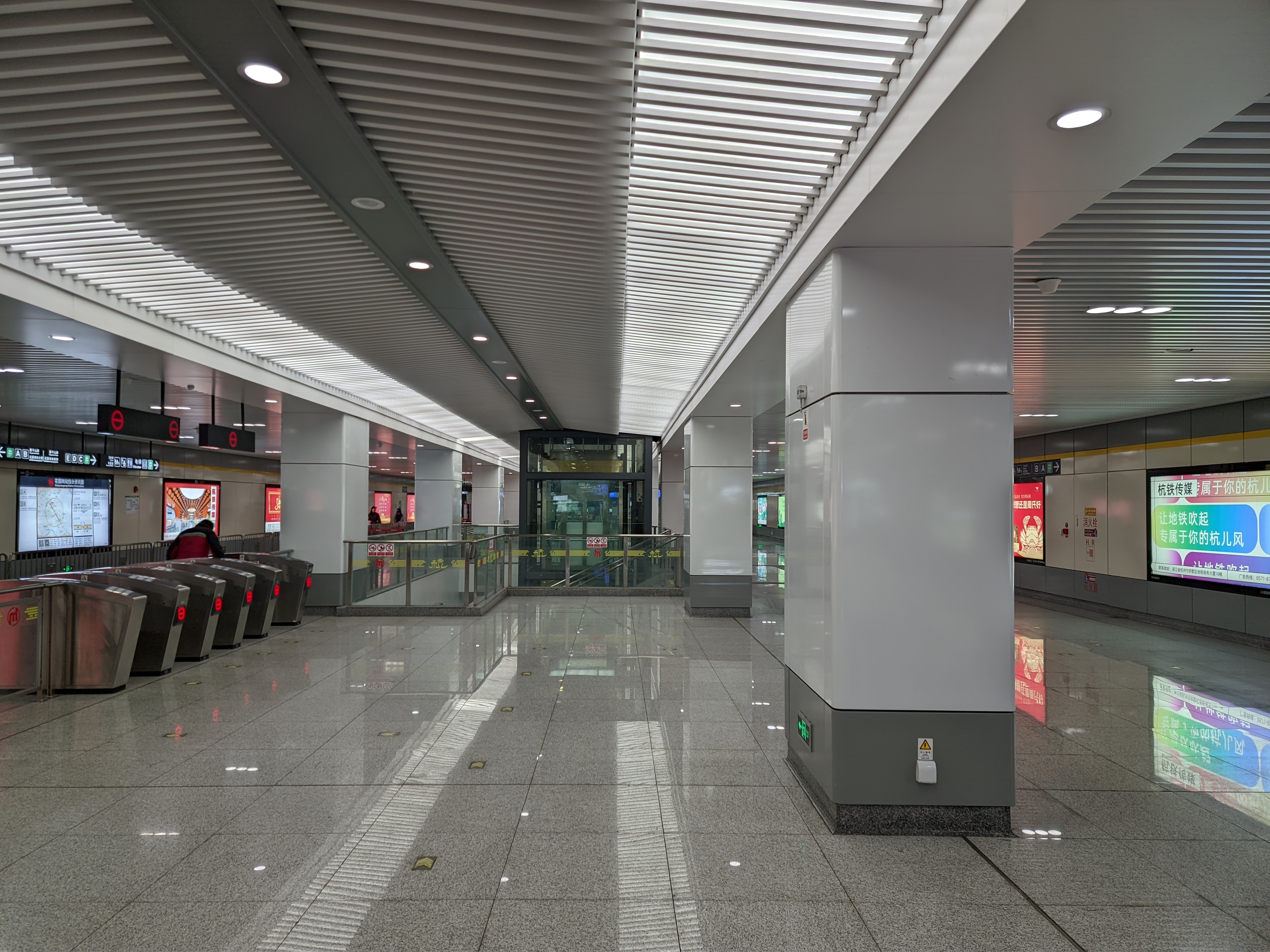
Concourse

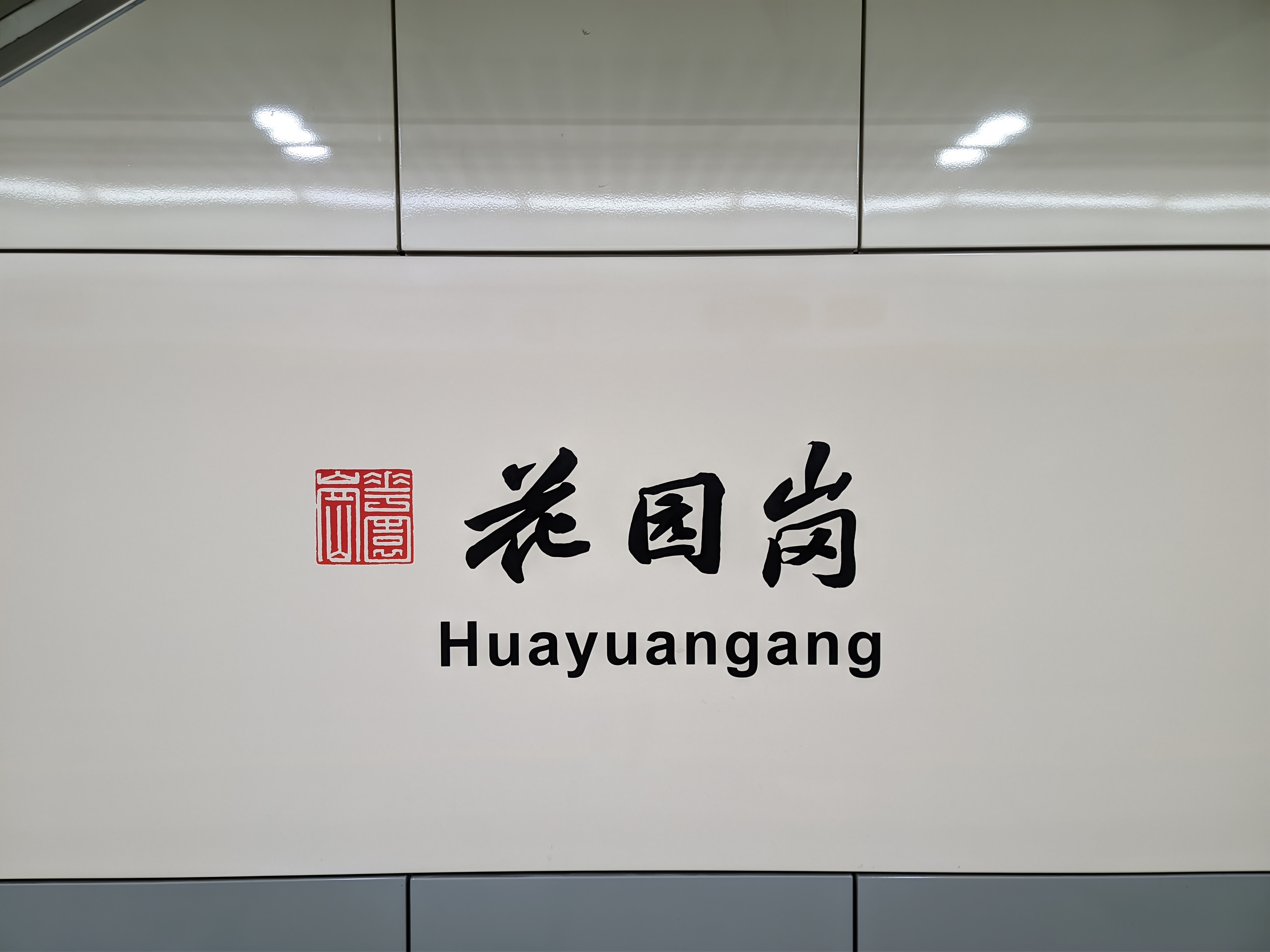
Station name

== Entrances/exits ==
- A: east side of Moganshan Road, north side of Huayuangang Street
- B: west side of Moganshan Road, north side of Huayuangang Street
- C: east side of Moganshan Road, south side of Huayuangang Street
- D1: Hangzhou North coach station
- E: Hangzhou North coach station
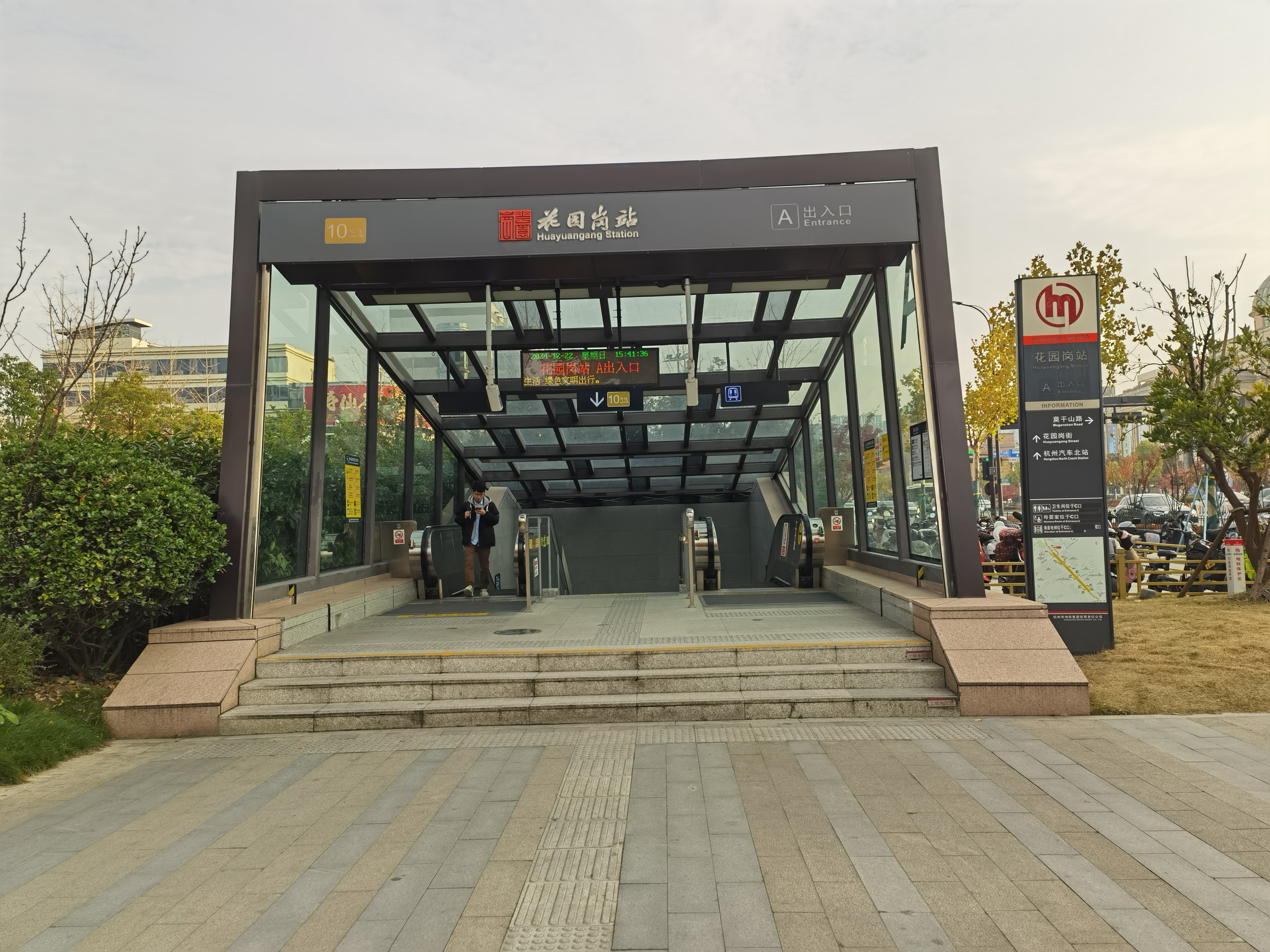
Entrance A

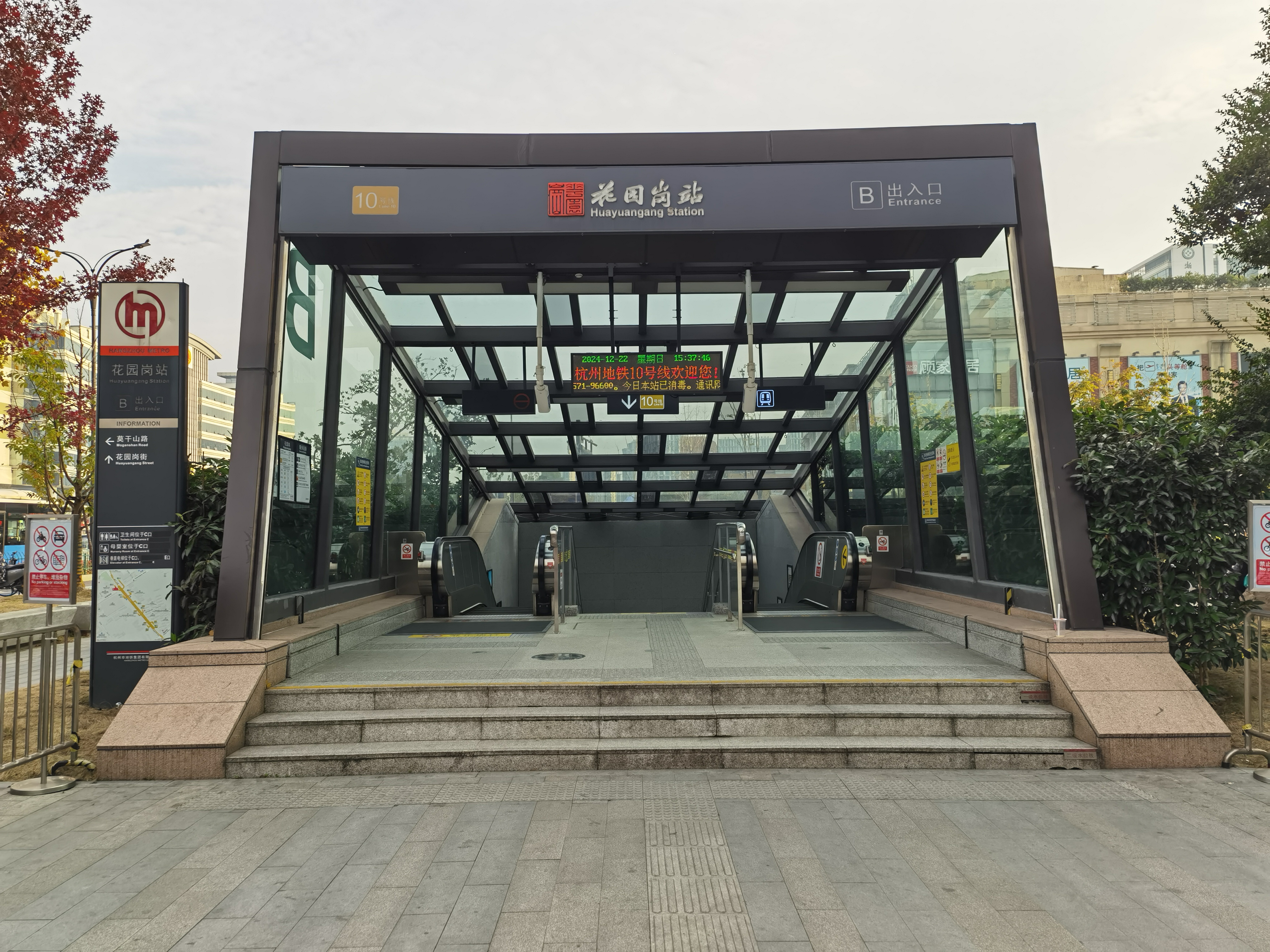
Entrance B

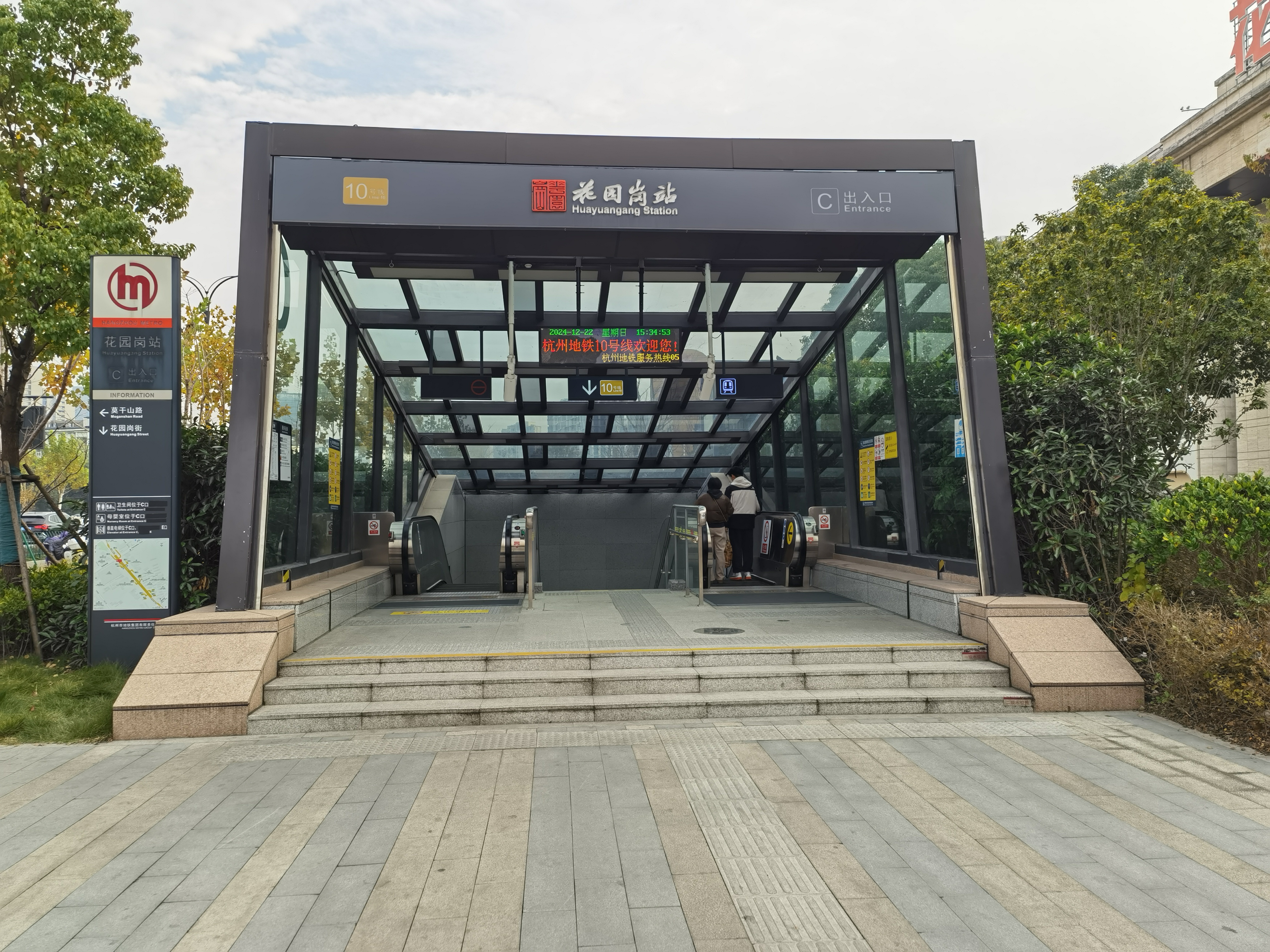
Entrance C

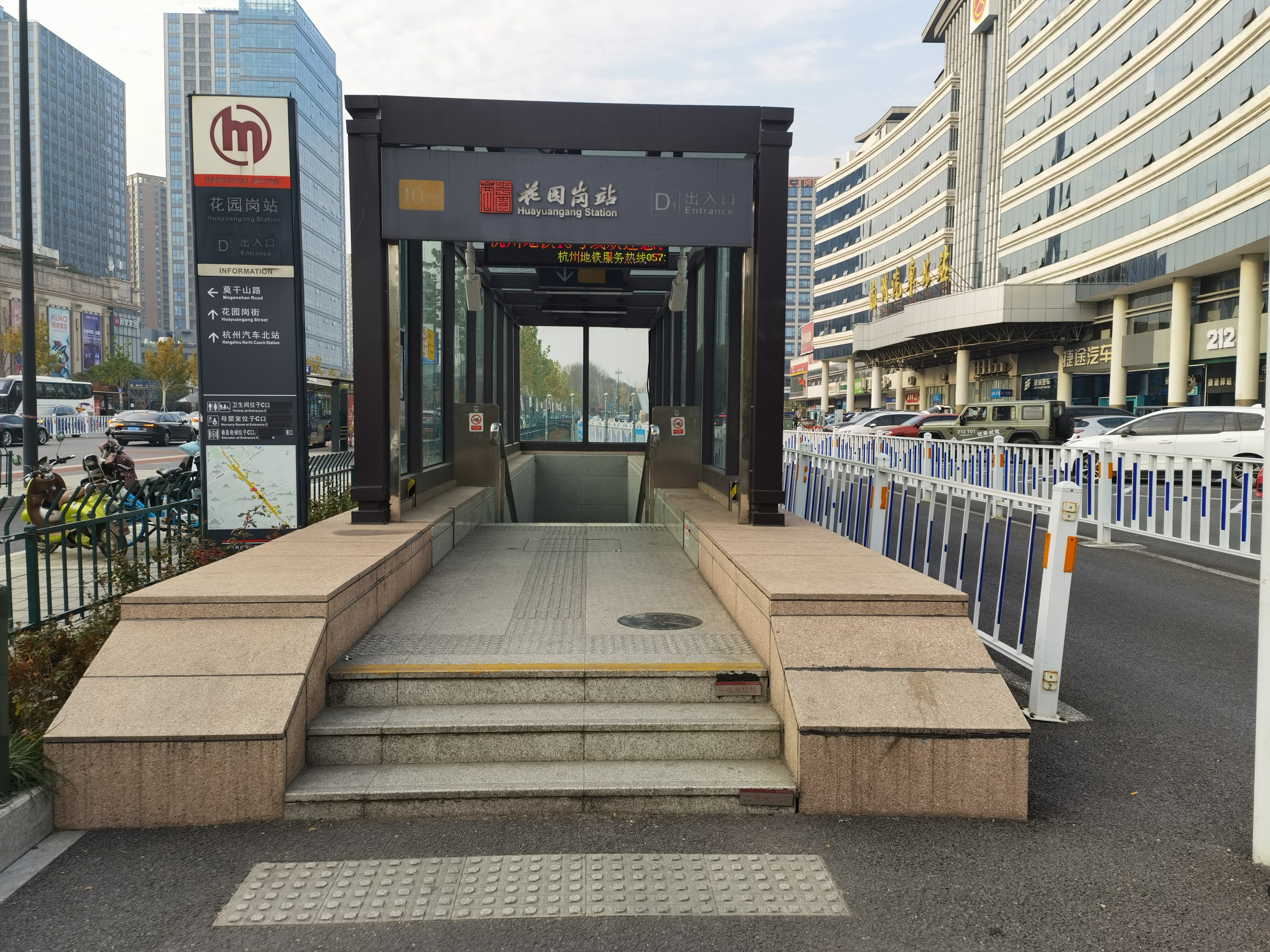
Entrance D1

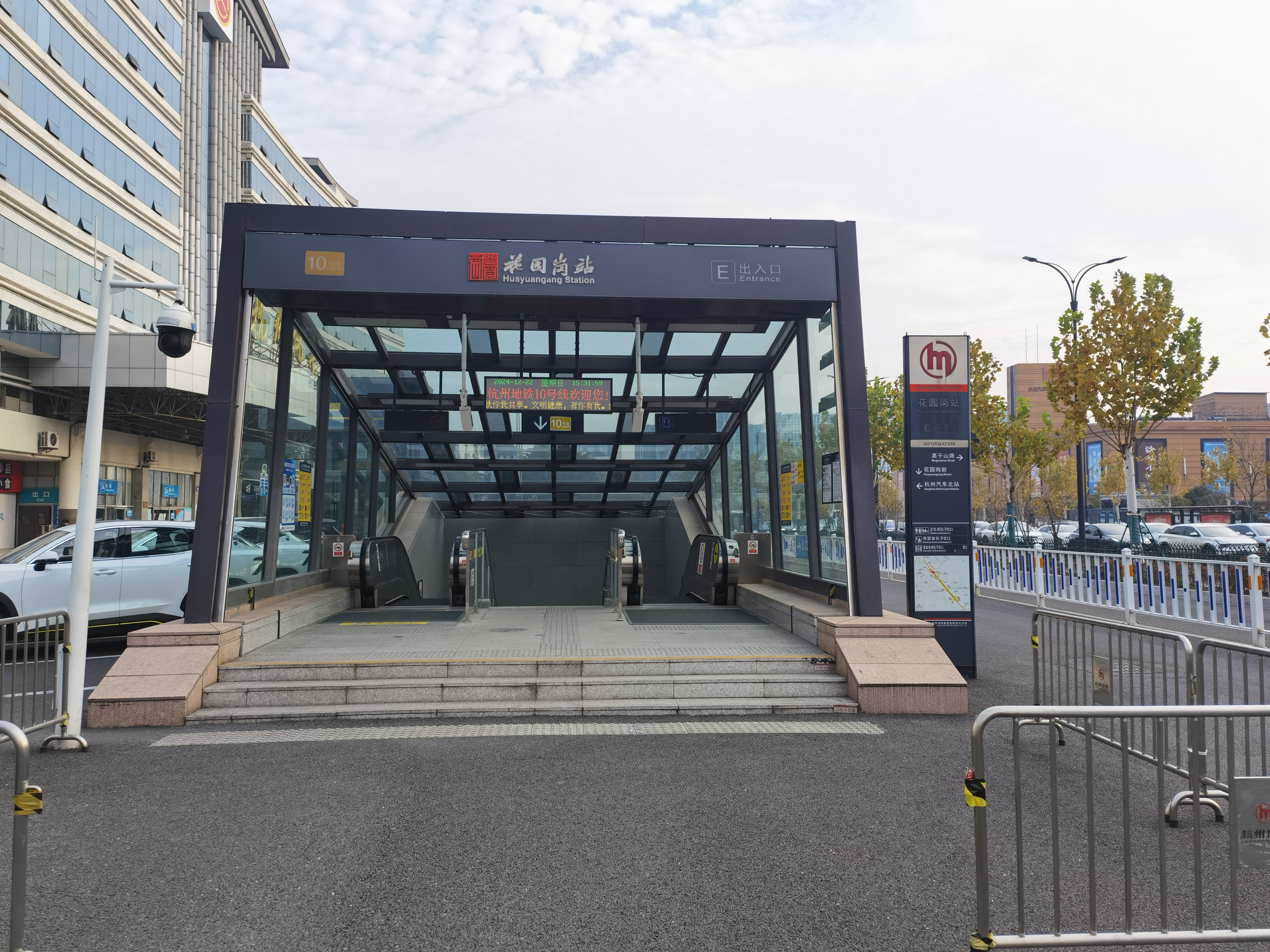
Entrance E
