= Gaotingba station =

Metro station in Hangzhou, China

Gaotingba 皋亭坝
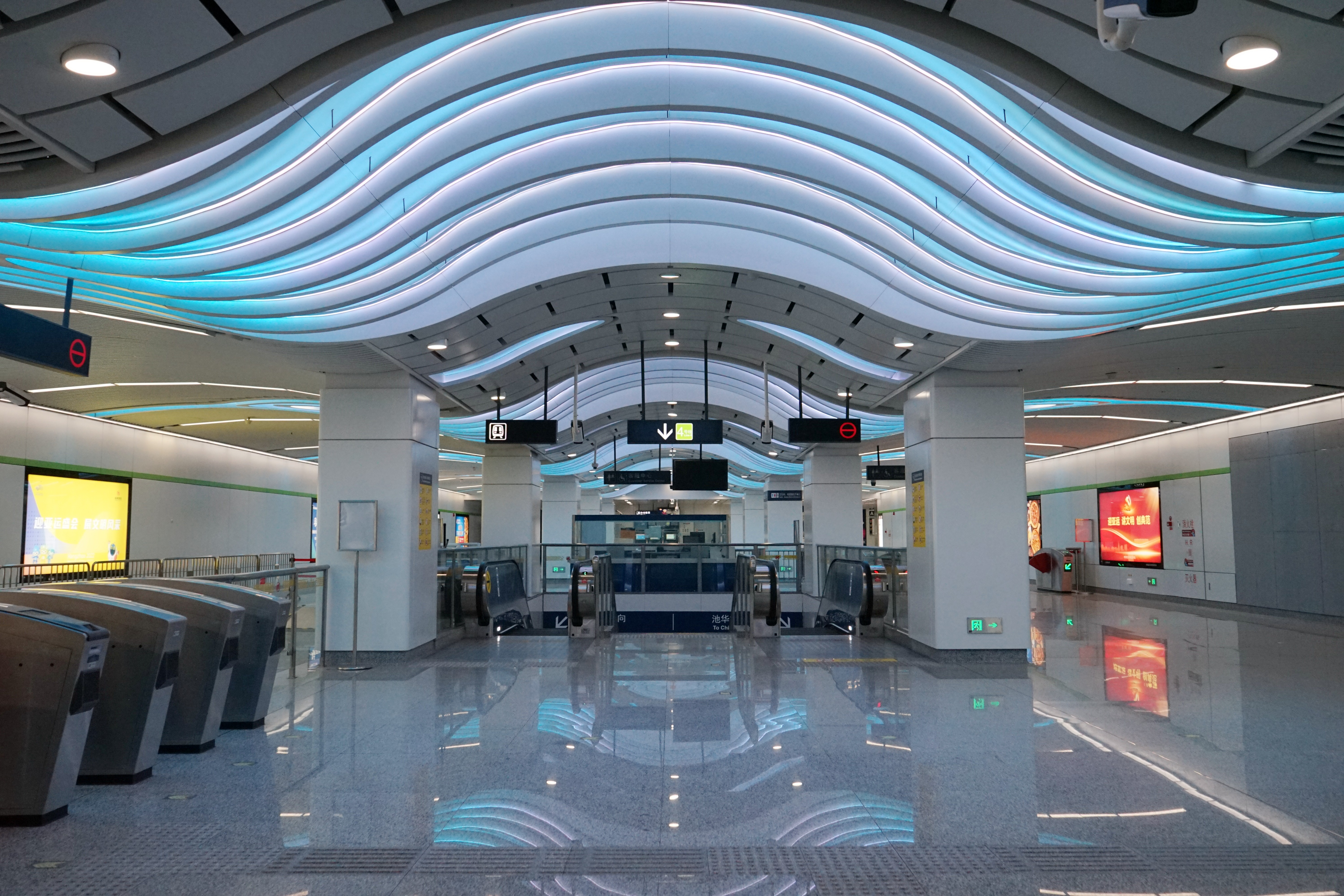
- Concourse

General information
- Location: Shenban Road × Changbin Street/Wangyun Street; Gongshu District, Hangzhou, Zhejiang; China
- Coordinates: 30.33254°N 120.16732°E
- System: Hangzhou metro station
- Operator: Hangzhou Metro Corporation
- Line: Line 4
- Platforms: 2 (1 island platform)

History
- Opened: 21 February 2022

Services
Preceding station	Hangzhou Metro	Following station
Xintiandi Street towards Puyan	Line 4	Taoyuan Street towards Chihua Street
Location

Gaotingba (Chinese: 皋亭坝) is a metro station of Line 4 of the Hangzhou Metro in China. It is located in Gongshu District of Hangzhou. The station was opened on 21 February 2022.

== Station layout ==
Gaotingba has two levels: a concourse, and an island platform with two tracks for line 4.

== Design ==
The station draws inspiration from the "Huanxiyongning Bridge" (Chinese: 欢喜永宁桥) on the Shangtang River, incorporating the design concept of reflections in the water. The ceiling features irregular shapes, with artistic glass creating a ripple effect, complemented by projected lighting to simulate the reflection of water ripples under sunlight.

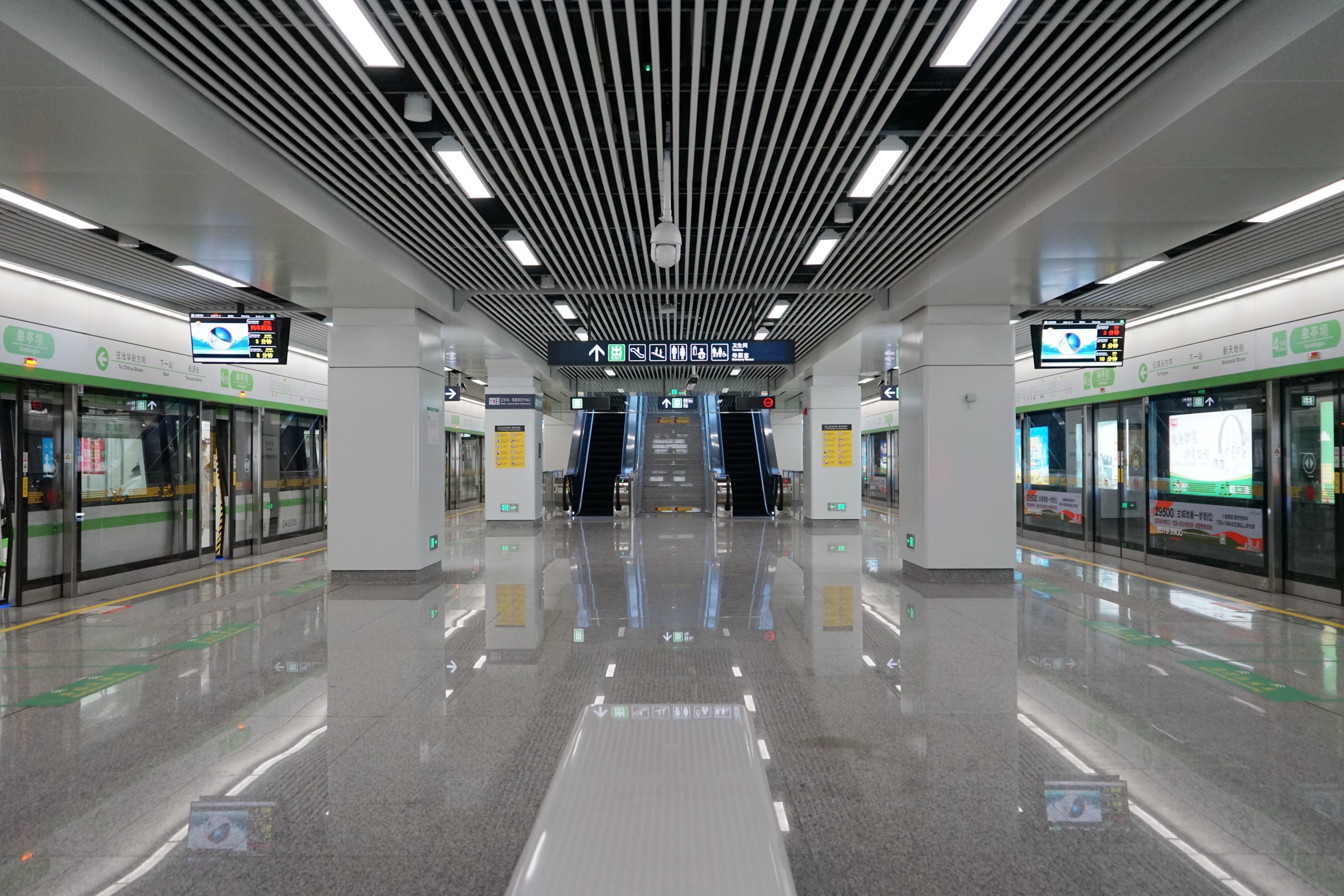
Platforms

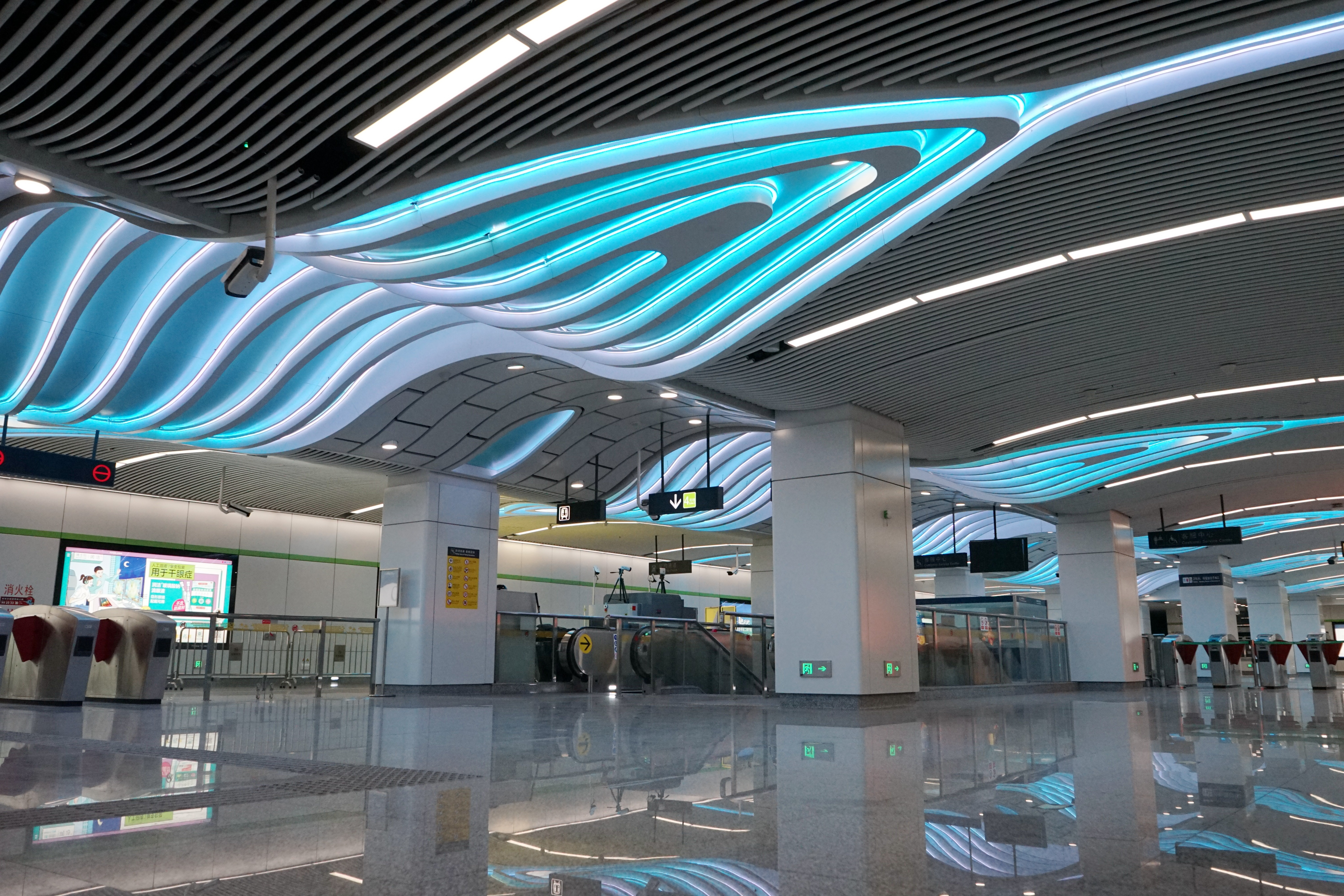
Concourse

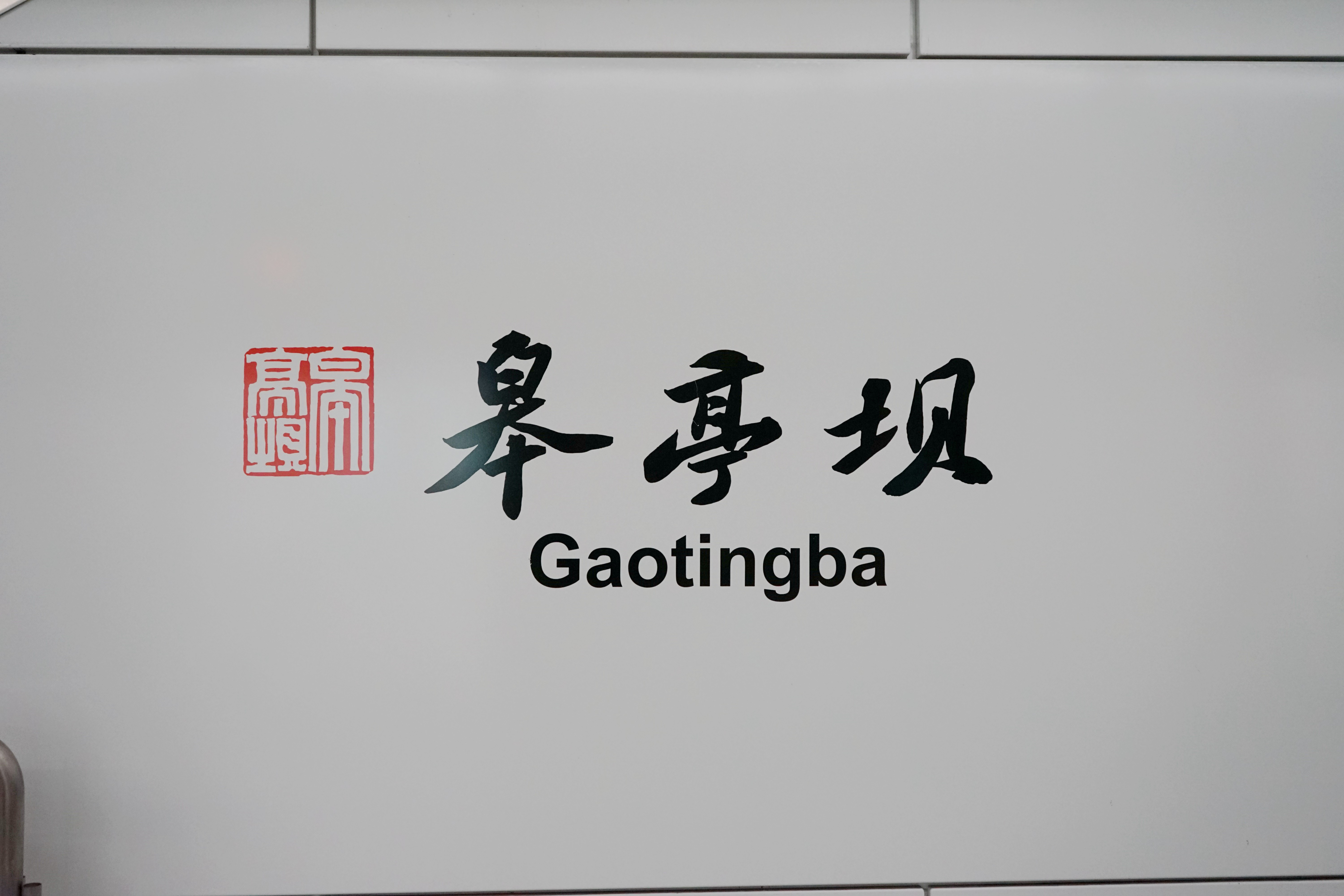
Station name

== Entrances/exits ==
- A: east side of Shenban Road
- B: west side of Shenban Road, Changbin Street
- C: west side of Shenban Road, Wangyun Street
- D: east side of Shenban Road, Shixiang Road
