= Xiangfu Bridge =

Xiangfu Bridge 祥符桥
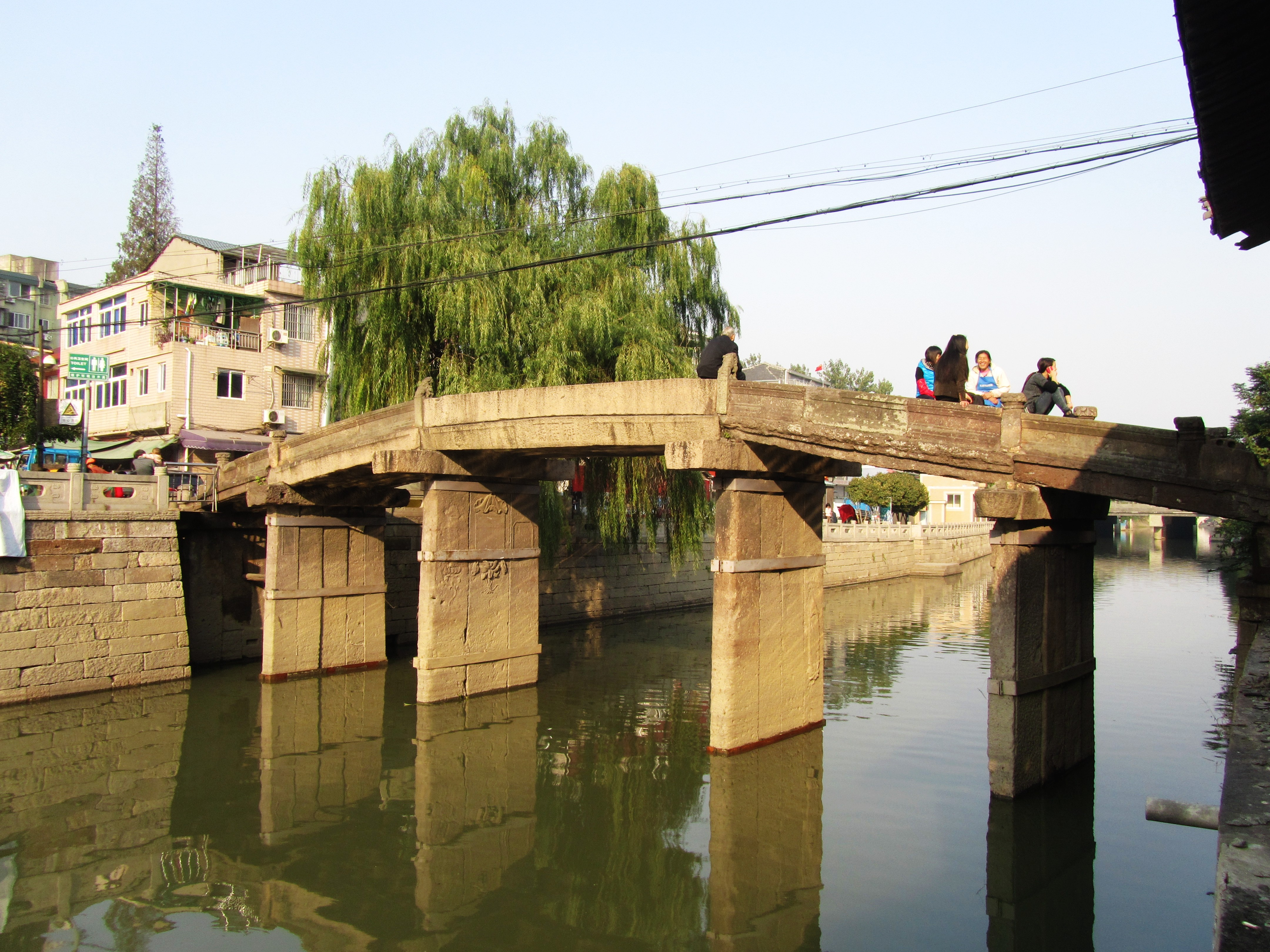
- Xiangfu Bridge in October 2013
- Coordinates: 30°19′56″N 120°06′41″E
- Carries: Pedestrians
- Crosses: Grand Canal
- Locale: Xiangfu Subdistrict, Gongshu District, Hangzhou, Zhejiang, China

Characteristics
- Design: Arch bridge
- Material: Stone
- Total length: 28 metres (92 ft)
- Width: 3.6 metres (12 ft)
- Height: 5 metres (16 ft)

History
- Rebuilt: 1543

Location
- Interactive map of Xiangfu Bridge

The Xiangfu Bridge (simplified Chinese: 祥符桥; traditional Chinese: 祥符橋; pinyin: Xiángfú Qiáo) is a historic stone arch bridge over the Grand Canal in Xiangfu Subdistrict, Gongshu District, Hangzhou, Zhejiang, China. It is the only Ming dynasty stone arch bridge preserved in Hangzhou. The bridge measures 28 metres (92 ft) long, 3.6 metres (12 ft) wide, and approximately 5 metres (16 ft) high.

== History ==
The first known instance of Xiangfu Bridge being documented on Lin'an Annals of Xianchun (咸淳临安志) appeared in 1268, during the Southern Song dynasty. The current bridge was rebuilt in 1543, during the reign of Jiajing Emperor of the Ming dynasty (1368–1644).

On 6 May 2013, it was listed among the seventh batch of "Major National Historical and Cultural Sites in Zhejiang" by the State Council of China.

== Gallery ==
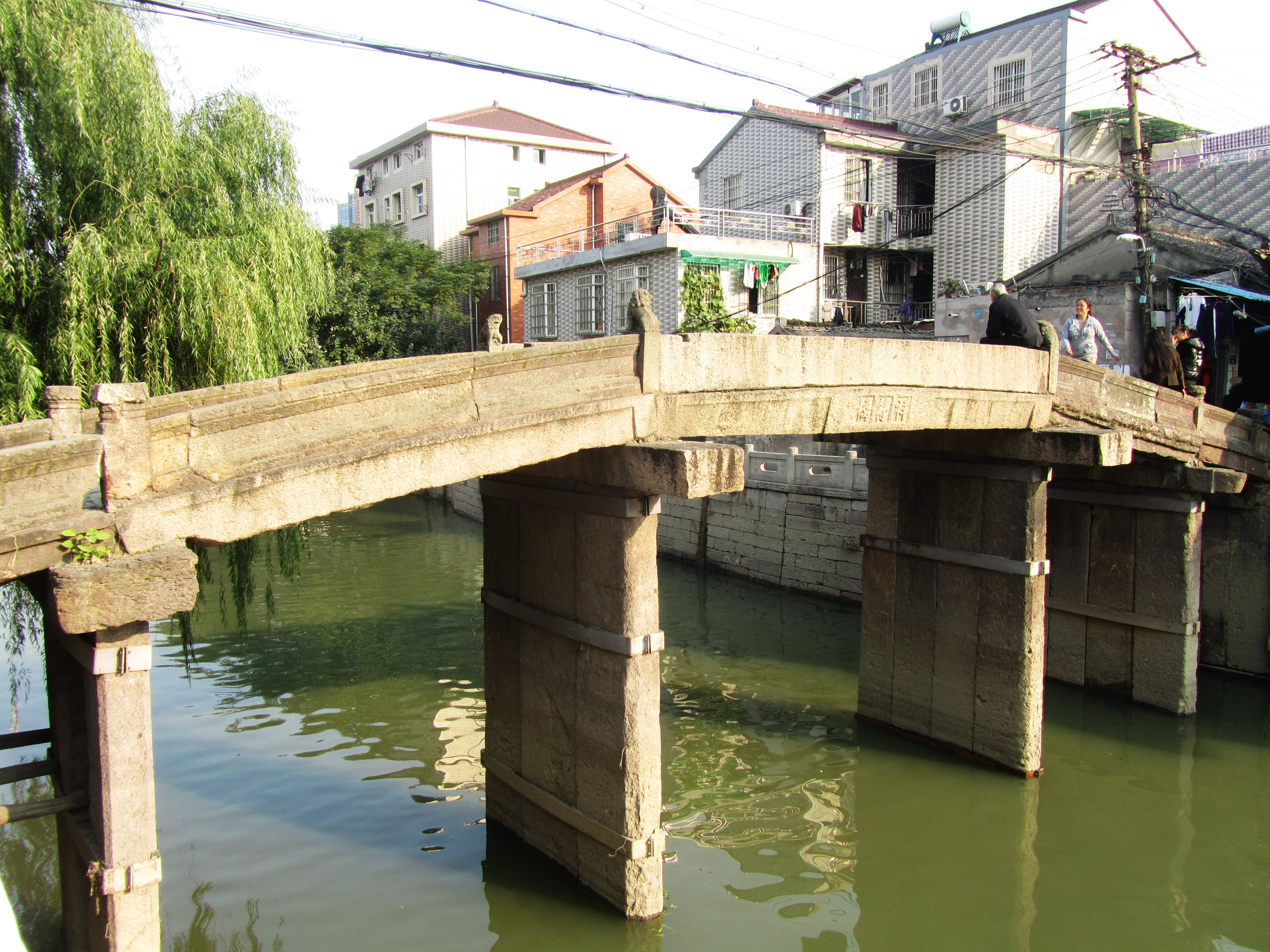
Xiangfu Bridge in October 2013

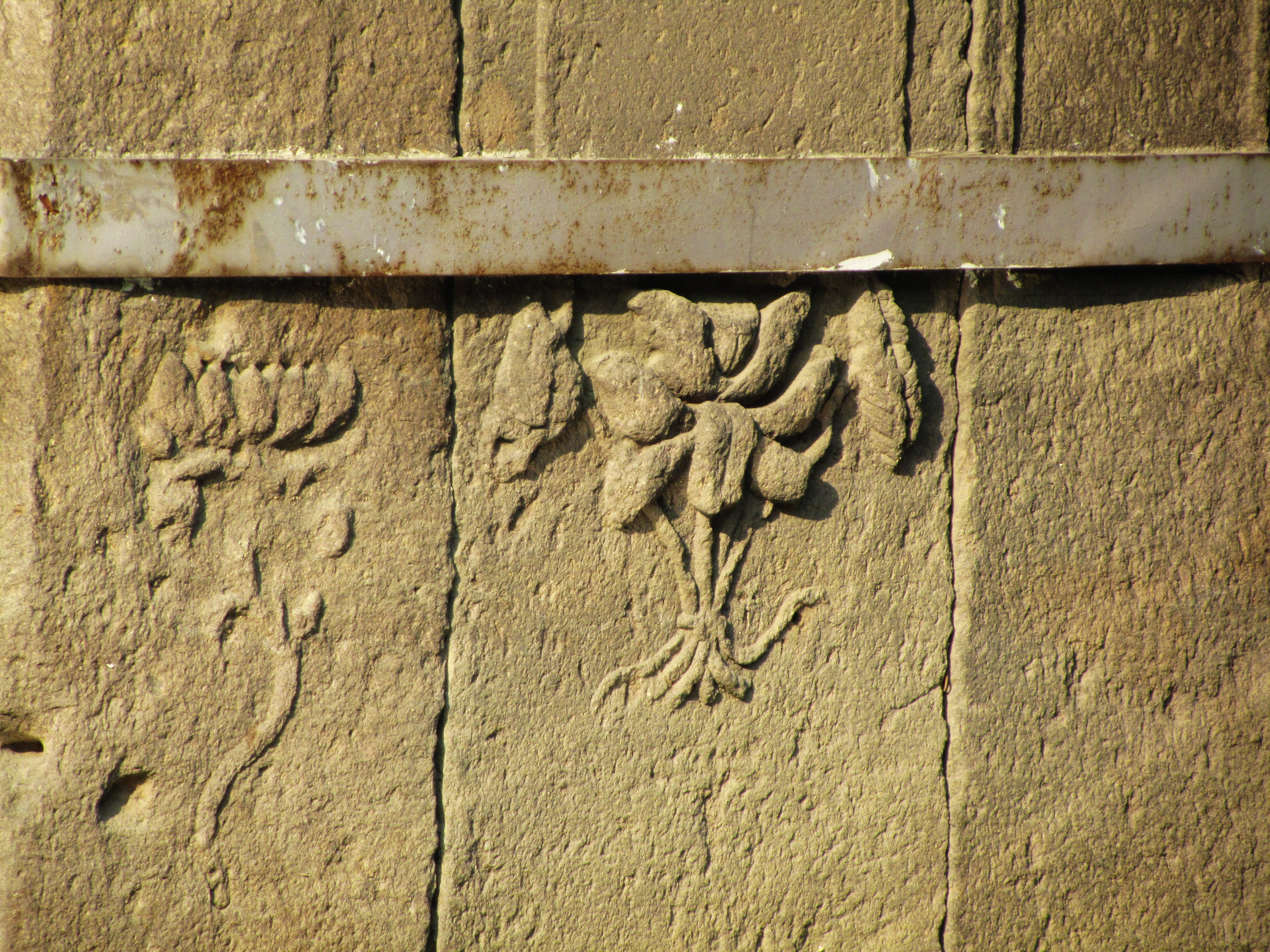
Lotus carving on the pier

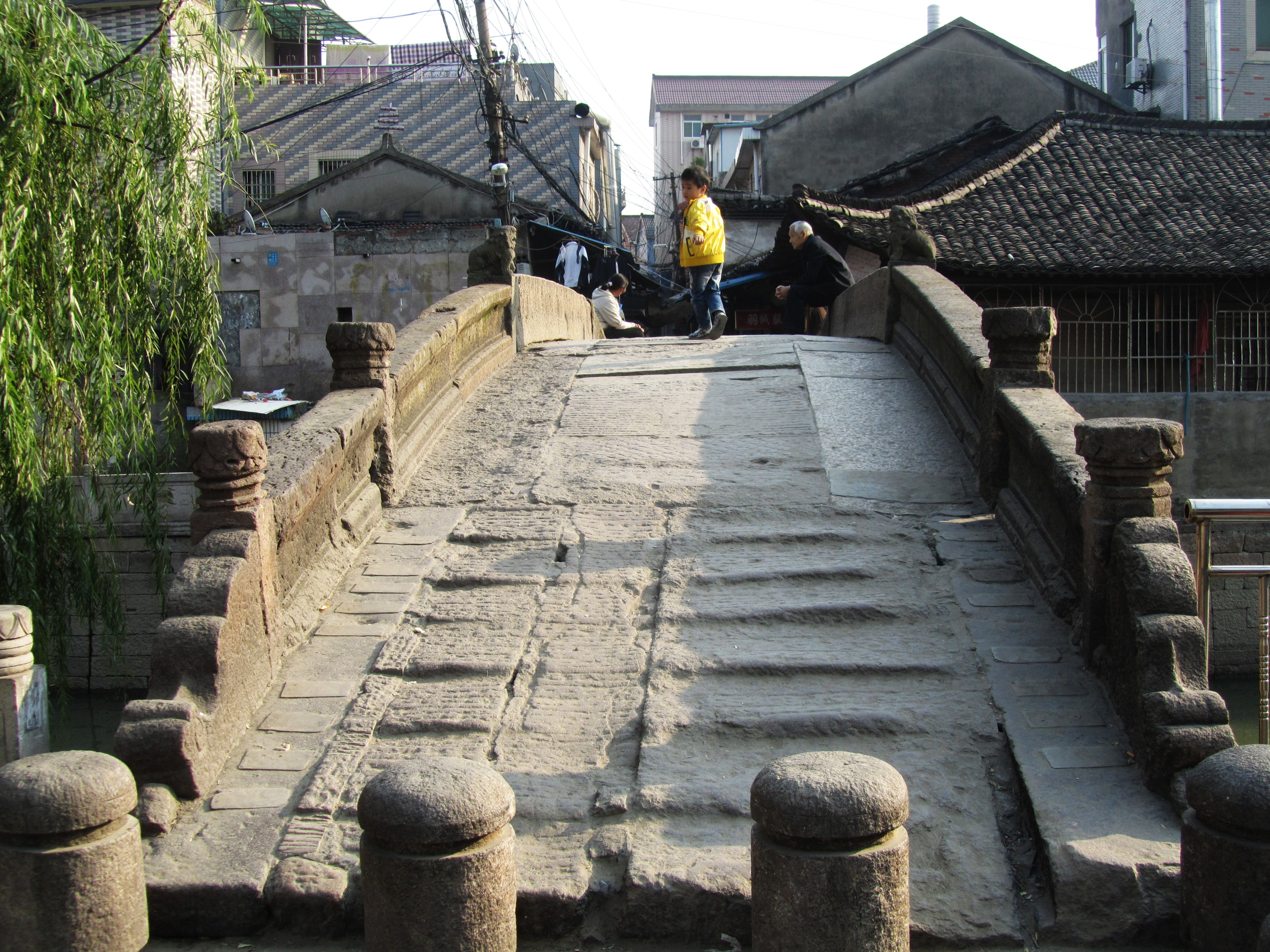
Xiangfu Bridge in October 2013

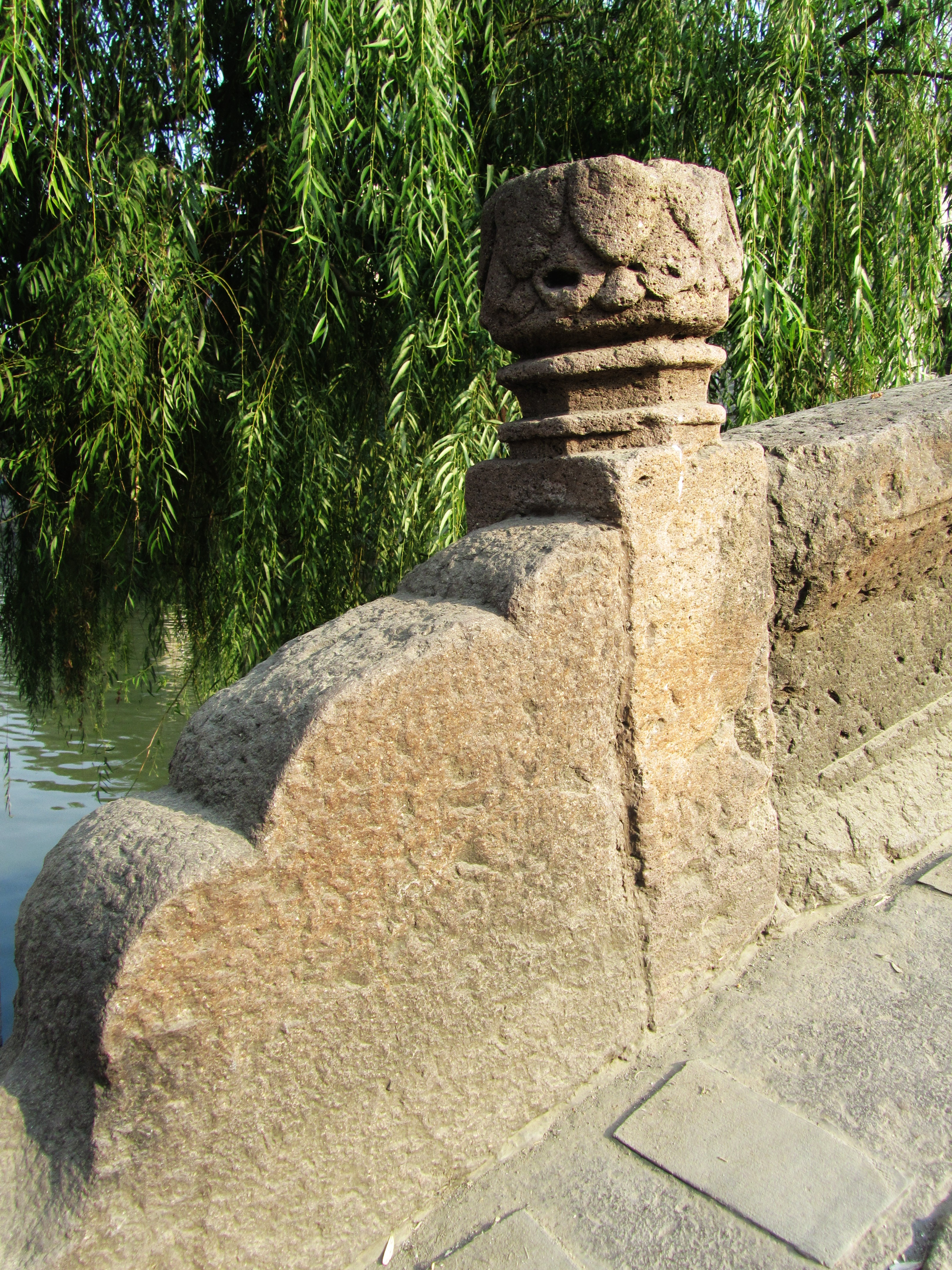
Stone lotus on the top of a baluster column

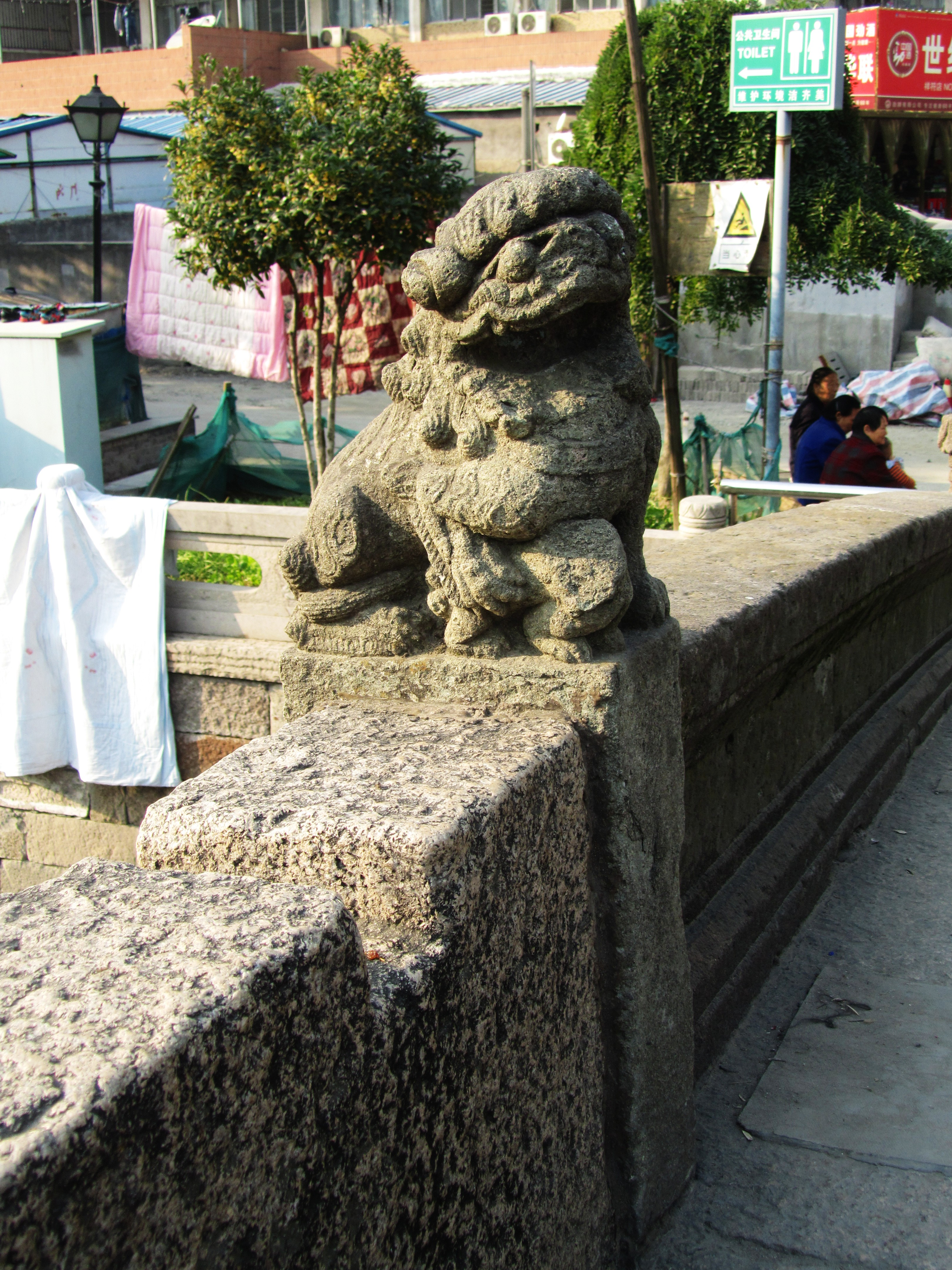
Stone lion on the top of a baluster column

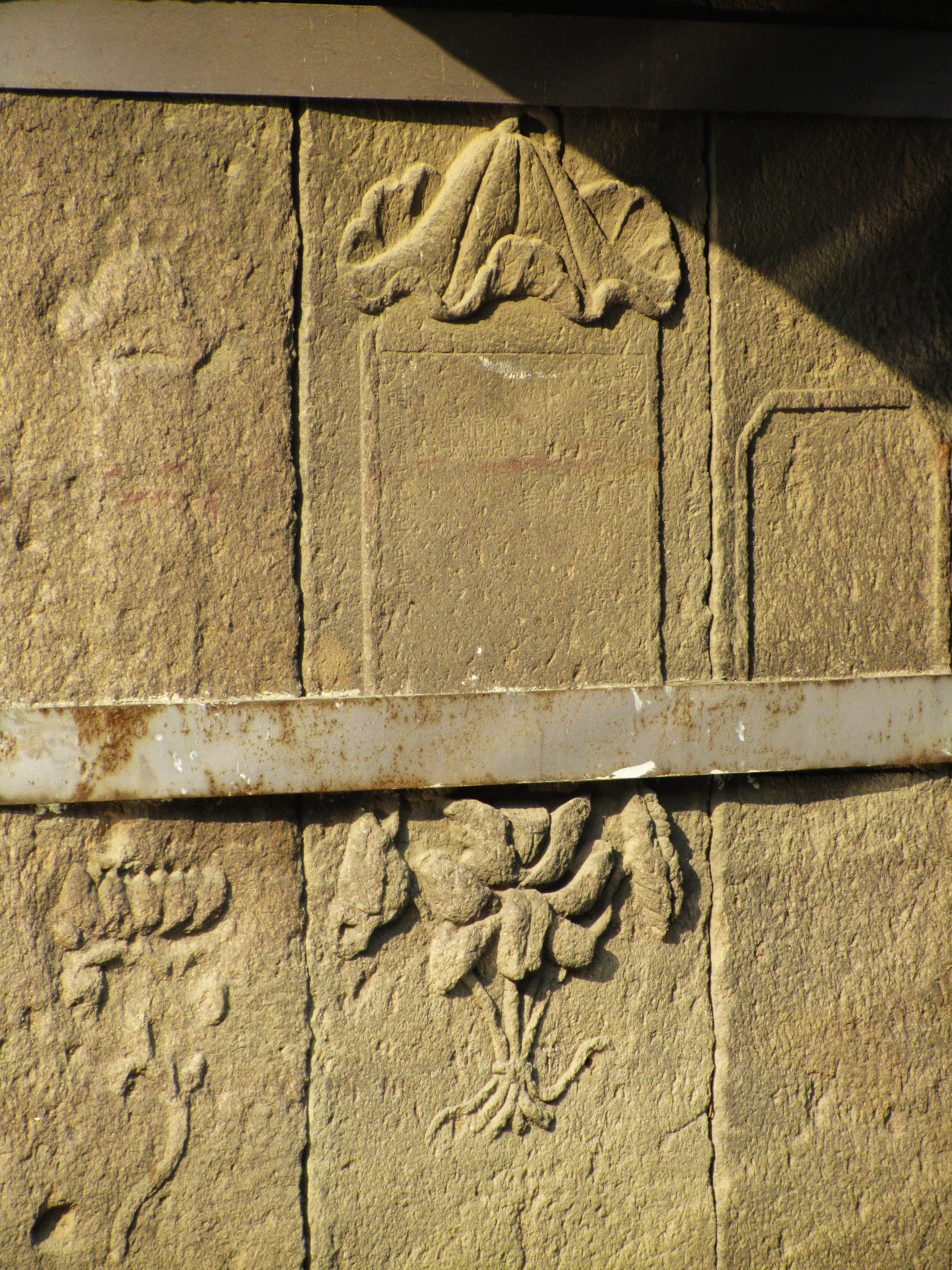
Lotus carving on the pier
