= Gongshu, Hangzhou =

District of Hangzhou in Zhejiang, China

Gongshu 拱墅区
- District
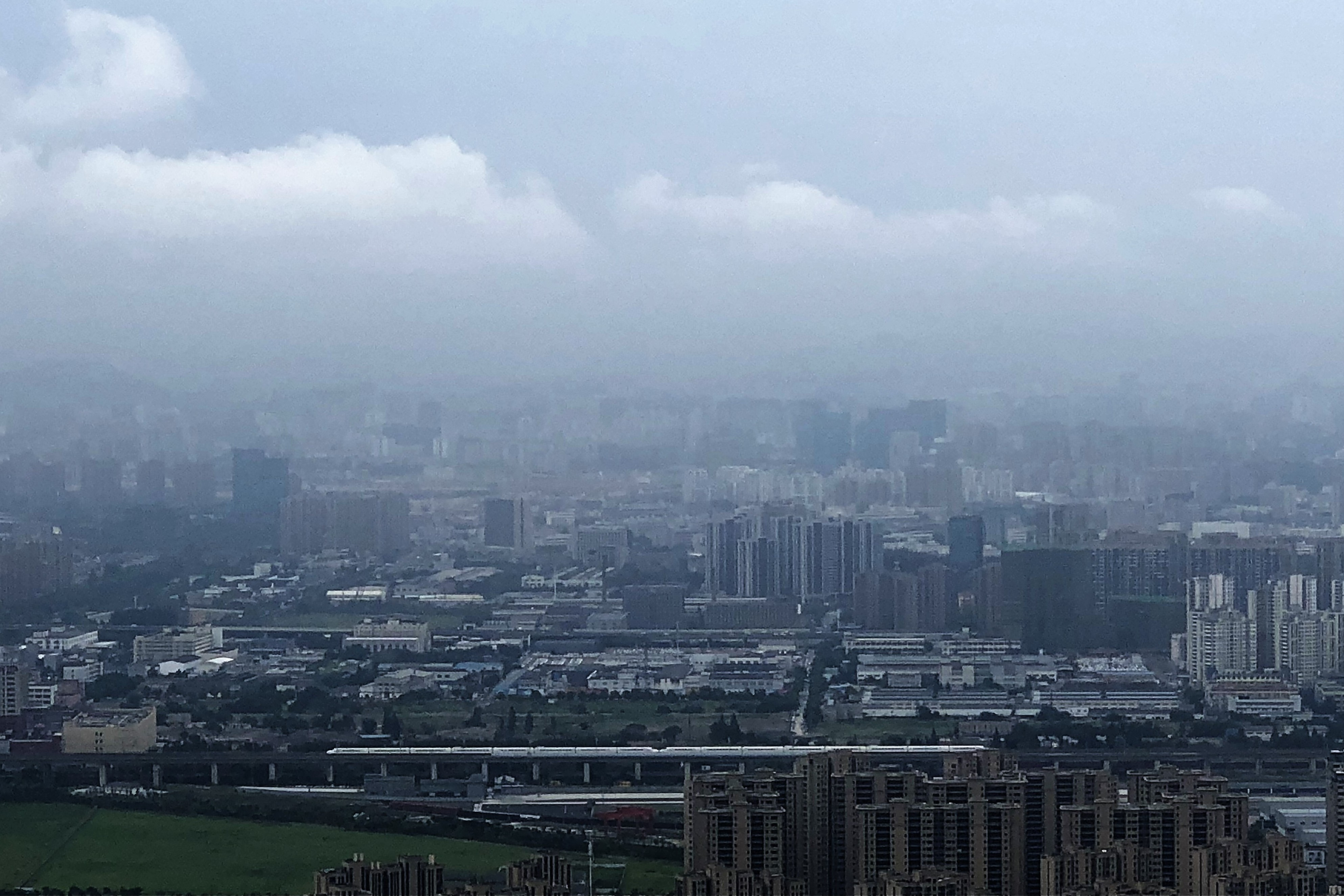
- Gongshu District, as seen from top of the Banshan Mountain

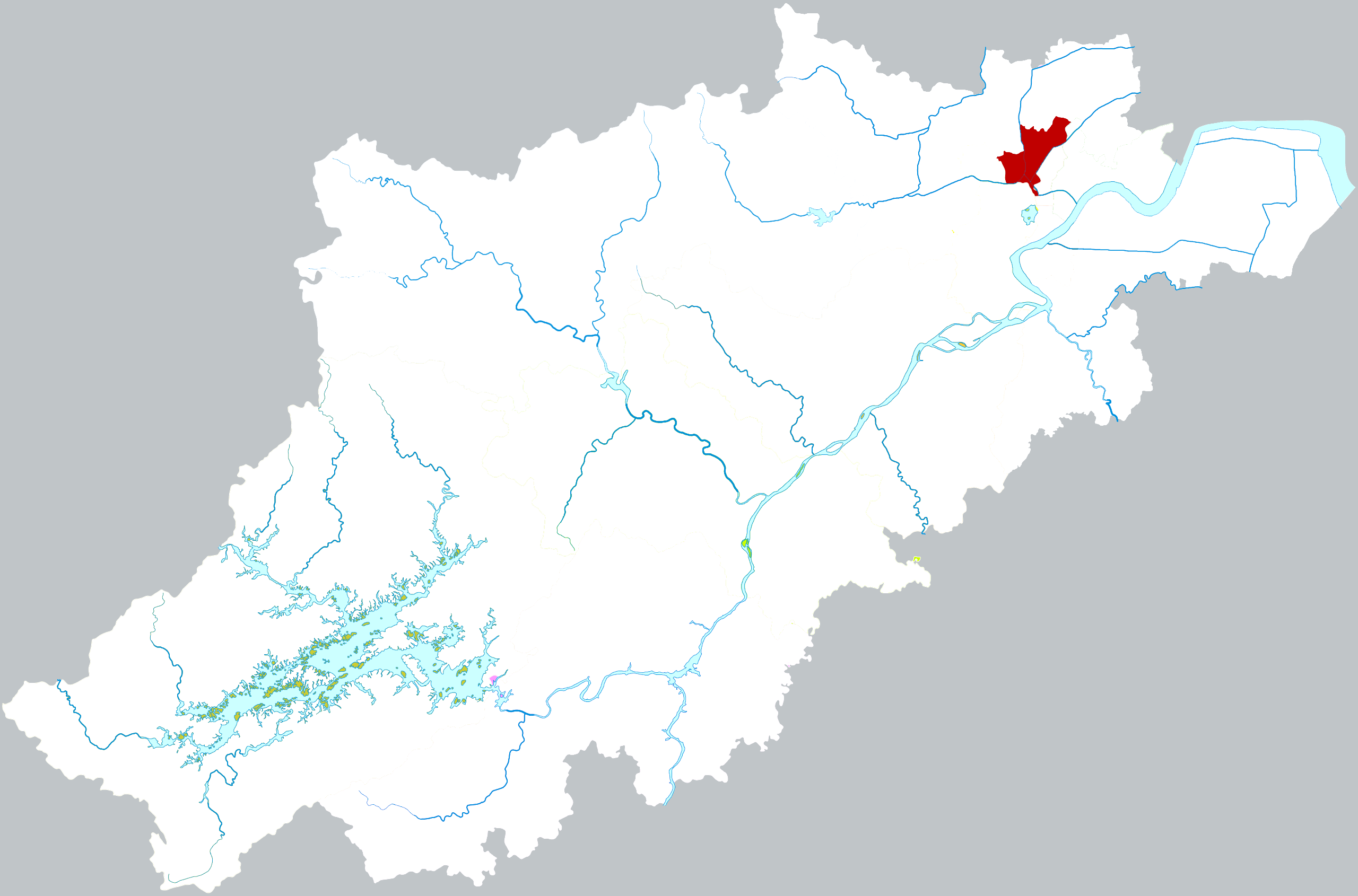
- Location of Gongshu District within Hangzhou

- Location in Zhejiang
- Coordinates: 30°21′N 120°09′E
- Country: People's Republic of China
- Province: Zhejiang
- Sub-provincial city: Hangzhou

Government
  - CPC Gongshu District Secretary: Zhu Jianming
  - District governor: Zhang Yan

Area
  - Total: 69.25 km^{2} (26.74 sq mi)

Population (2022)
  - Total: 361,609
  - Density: 5,222/km^{2} (13,520/sq mi)
- Time zone: UTC+8 (China Standard)
- Website: www.gongshu.gov.cn

Gongshu, Hangzhou
- Simplified Chinese: 拱墅区
- Traditional Chinese: 拱墅區
- Literal meaning: Surrounding villa district
Transcriptions
Standard Mandarin
- Hanyu Pinyin: Gǒngshù Qū

Gongshu District (Chinese: 拱墅区) is an urban district of Hangzhou, Zhejiang, China. It is located in the core urban area of Hangzhou.

== Administrative divisions ==
Subdistricts:

- Mishixiang Subdistrict (米市巷街道), Hushu Subdistrict (湖墅街道), Xiaohe Subdistrict (小河街道), Hemu Subdistrict (和睦街道), Hongchenqiao Subdistrict (拱宸桥街道), Daguan Subdistrict (大关街道), Shangtang Subdistrict (上塘街道), Xiangfu Subdistrict (祥符街道)

Towns:

- Kangqiao (康桥镇), Banshan (半山镇)

== Tourist attractions ==
Xiangfu Bridge is a historic stone arch bridge in the district.
