= East Safari Park station =

Metro station in Hangzhou, China

East Safari Park 野生动物园东
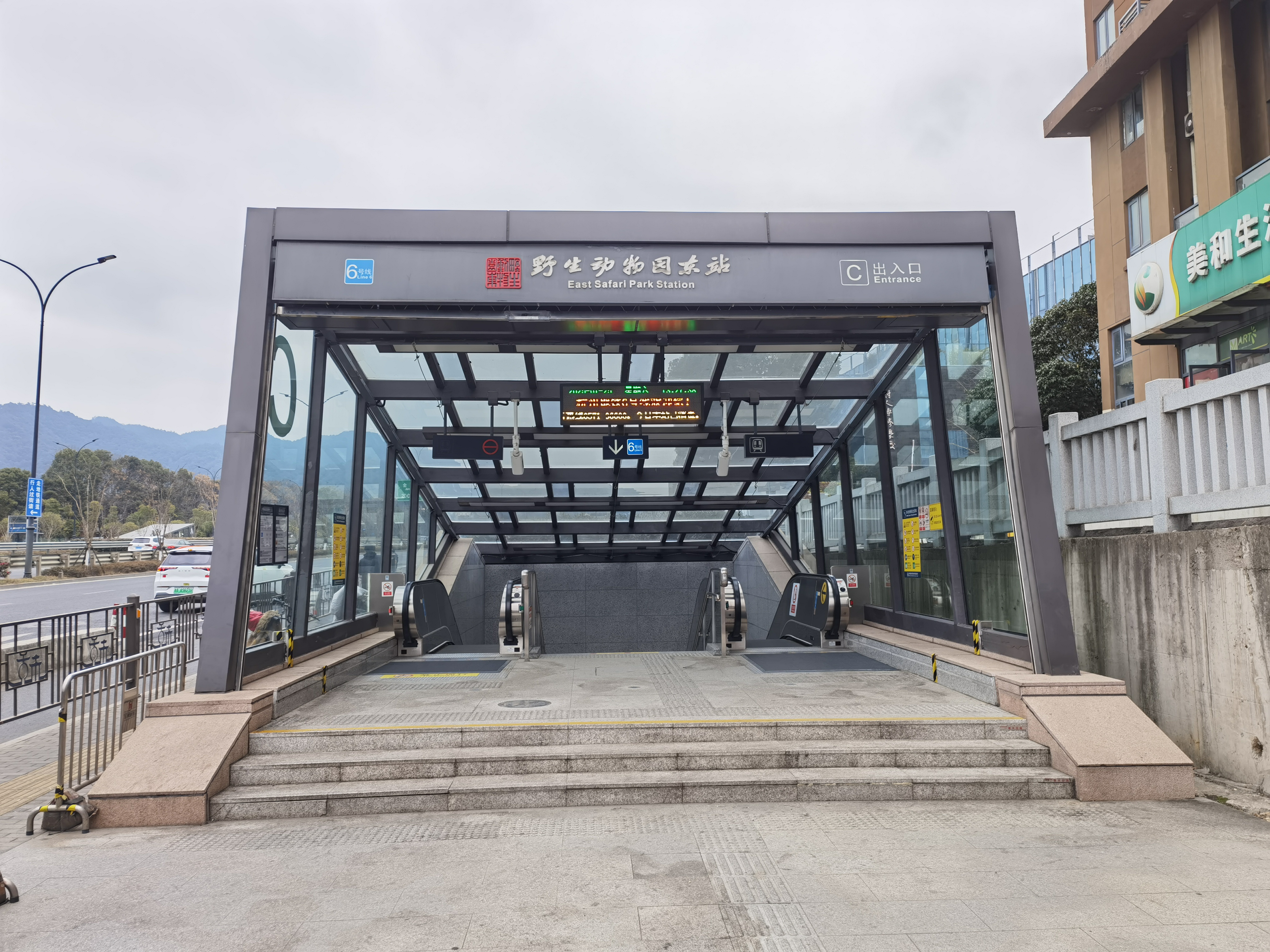
- Entrance C

General information
- Location: Fuyang District, Hangzhou, Zhejiang; China
- Coordinates: 30.14936°N 119.99739°E
- Operator: Hangzhou Metro Corporation
- Line: Line 6

Other information
- Station code: YSD

History
- Opened: 30 December 2020

Services
Preceding station	Hangzhou Metro	Following station
Yinhu towards West Guihua Road	Line 6	Zhongcun towards Goujulong
Location

East Safari Park (Chinese: 野生动物园东) is a metro station on Line 6 of the Hangzhou Metro in China. It was opened on 30 December 2020, together with the Line 6. It is located in Fuyang District of Hangzhou, the capital city of Zhejiang province.
