= Xipu Road station =

Metro station in Hangzhou, China

Xipu Road 西浦路
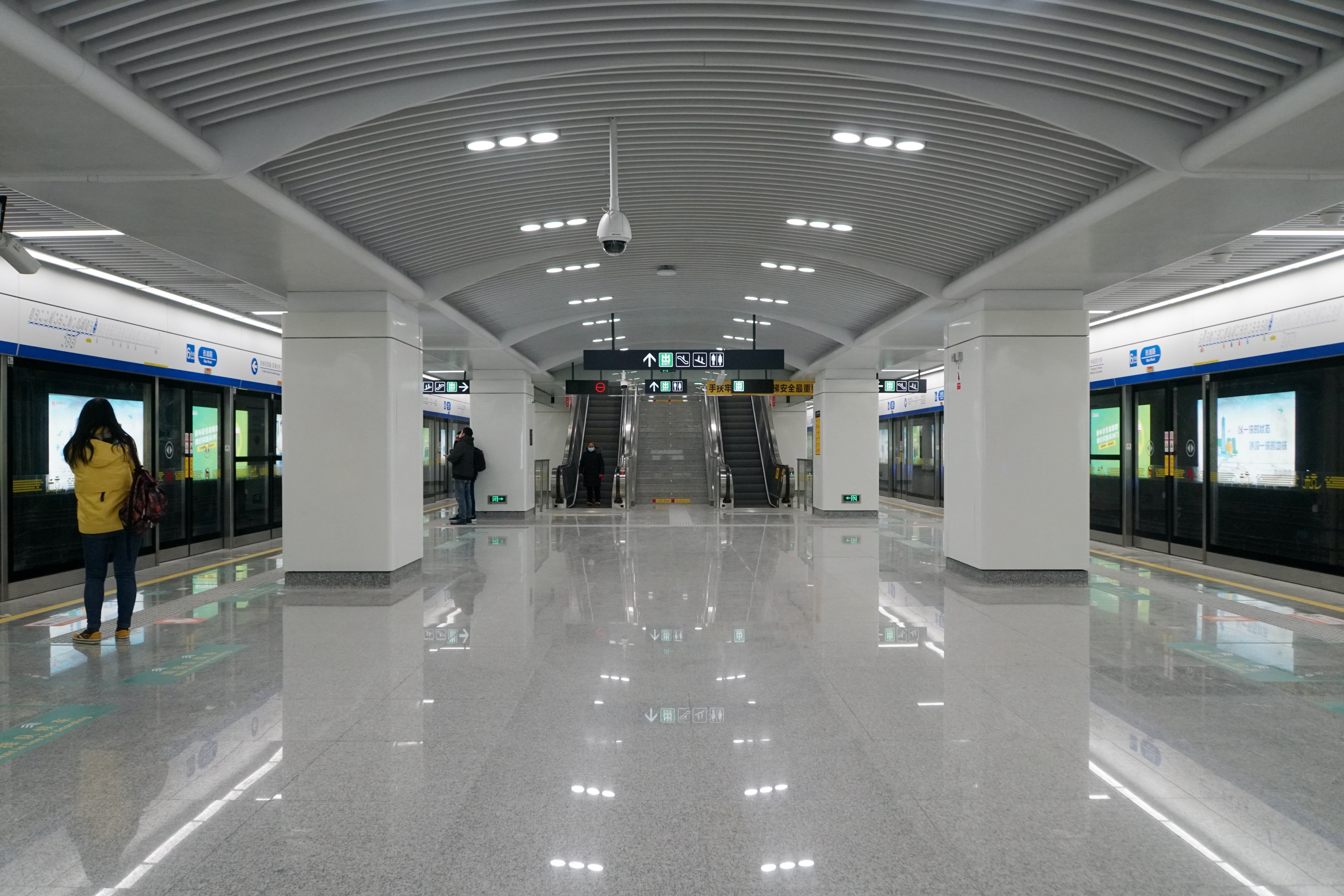
- Platform

General information
- Location: Binjiang District, Hangzhou, Zhejiang; China
- Coordinates: 30.170883°N 120.132353°E
- Operator: Hangzhou Metro Corporation
- Line: Line 6
- Platforms: 2 (1 island platform)

History
- Opened: 30 December 2020

Services
Preceding station	Hangzhou Metro	Following station
Zhipu Road towards West Guihua Road or Shuangpu	Line 6	Zhejiang Chinese Medical University towards Goujulong
Location

Xipu Road (Chinese: 西浦路) is a metro station on Line 6 of the Hangzhou Metro in China. Opened on 30 December 2020 along with other Line 6 stations completed in Phase 1, it is located on the east bank of Qiantang River, in the Binjiang District of Hangzhou.
