= Huxiaoxing station =

Metro station in Hangzhou, China

Huxiaoxing 虎啸杏
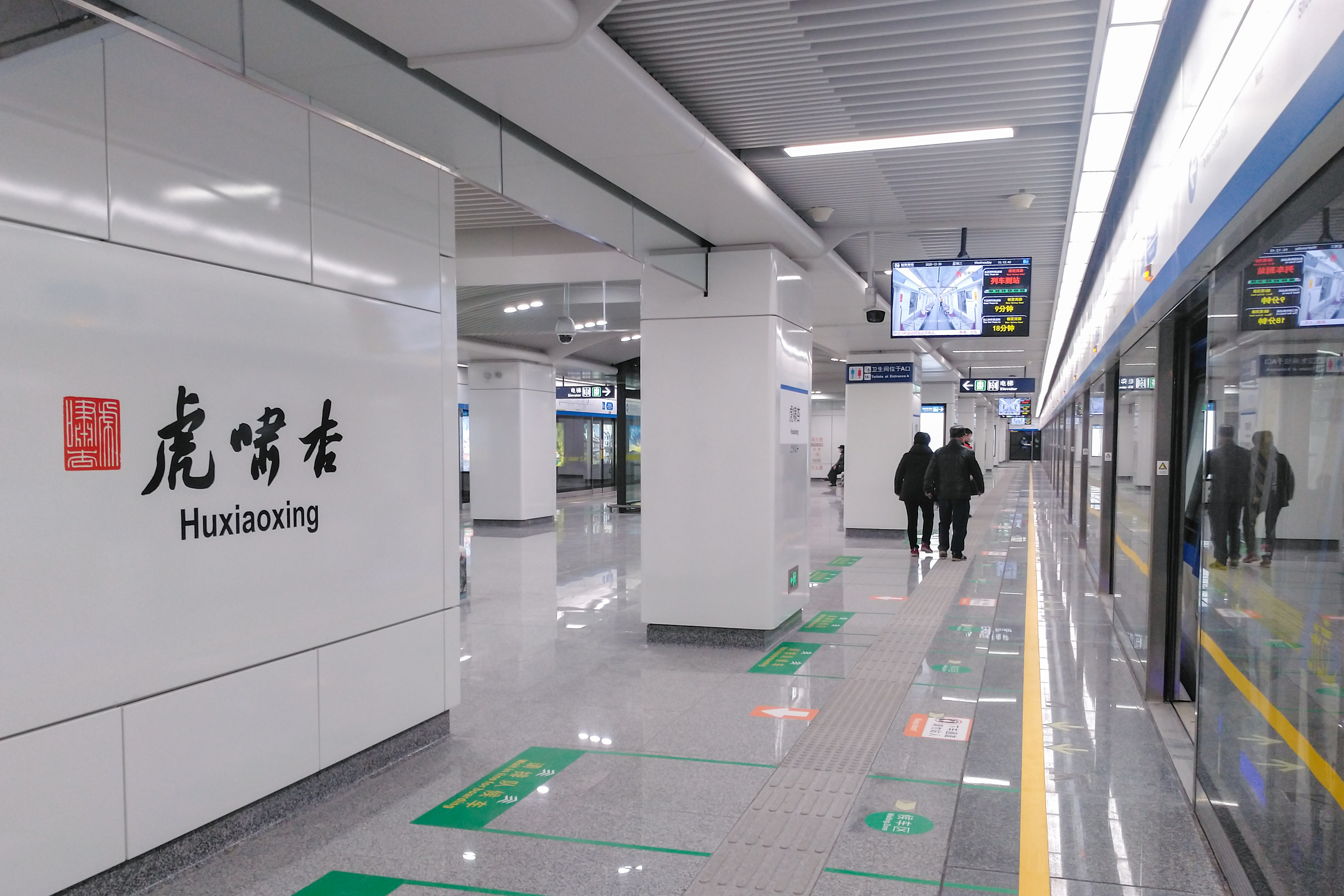

General information
- Location: Fuyang District, Hangzhou, Zhejiang; China
- Operator: Hangzhou Metro Corporation
- Line: Line 6

Other information
- Station code: HXX

History
- Opened: 30 December 2020

Services
Preceding station	Hangzhou Metro	Following station
Shouxiang towards West Guihua Road	Line 6	Yinhu towards Goujulong
Location

Huxiaoxing (Chinese: 虎啸杏) is a metro station on Line 6 of the Hangzhou Metro in China. It was opened on 30 December 2020, together with the Line 6. The station is located in Fuyang District of Hangzhou, the capital city of the Chinese province Zhejiang.
