= Gaoqiao station (Hangzhou Metro) =

Metro station in Hangzhou, China

Gaoqiao 高桥
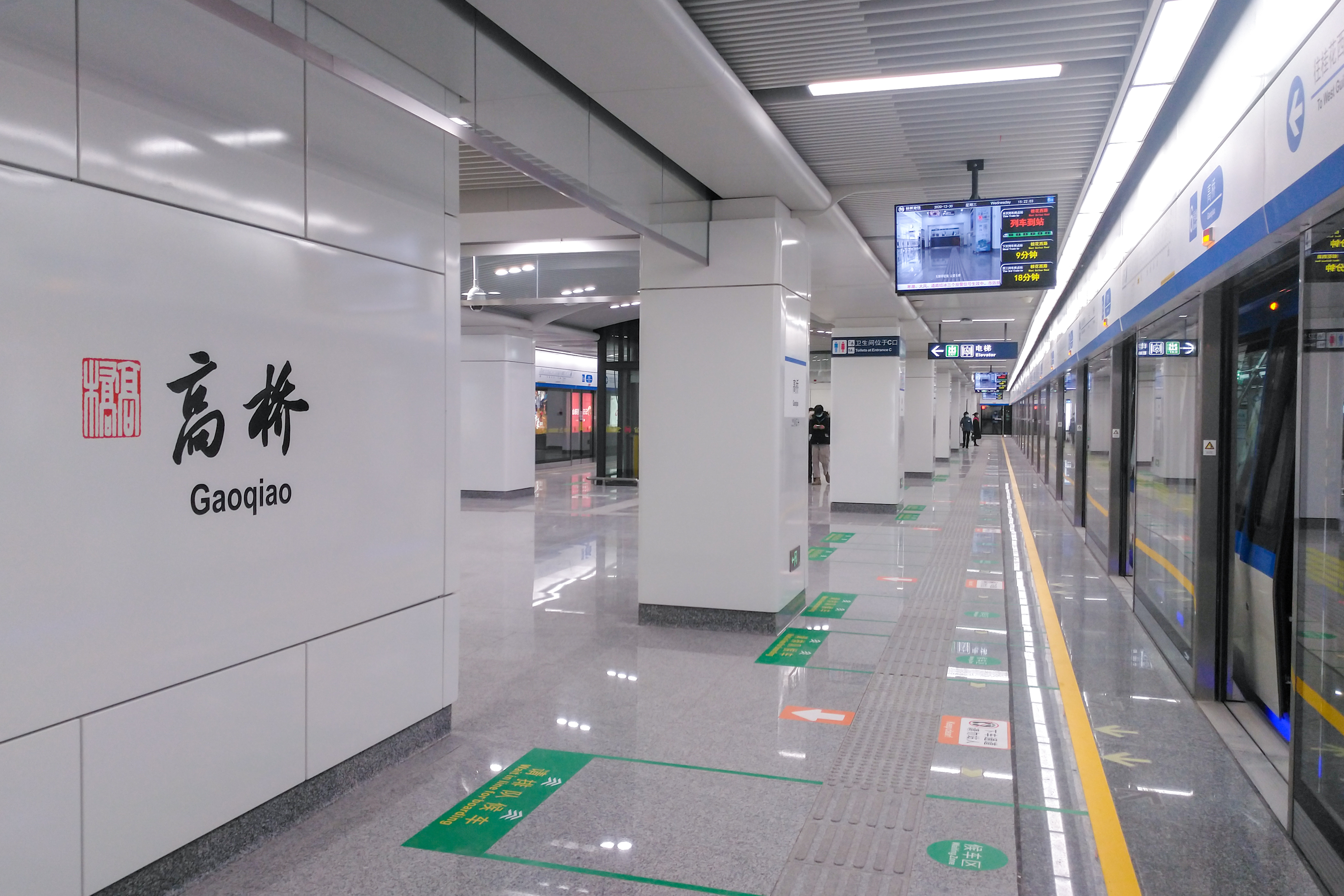

General information
- Location: Fuyang District, Hangzhou, Zhejiang; China
- Operator: Hangzhou Metro Corporation
- Line: Line 6

Other information
- Station code: GAQ

History
- Opened: 30 December 2020

Services
Preceding station	Hangzhou Metro	Following station
Yangbeihu towards West Guihua Road	Line 6	Fuyang Coach Center towards Goujulong
Location

Gaoqiao (Chinese: 高桥) is a metro station on Line 6 of the Hangzhou Metro in China. It was opened on 30 December 2020, together with the Line 6. It is located in the Fuyang District of Hangzhou, the capital of Zhejiang province.
