= Tanhua'an Road station =

Metro station in China

Tanhua'an Road 昙花庵路
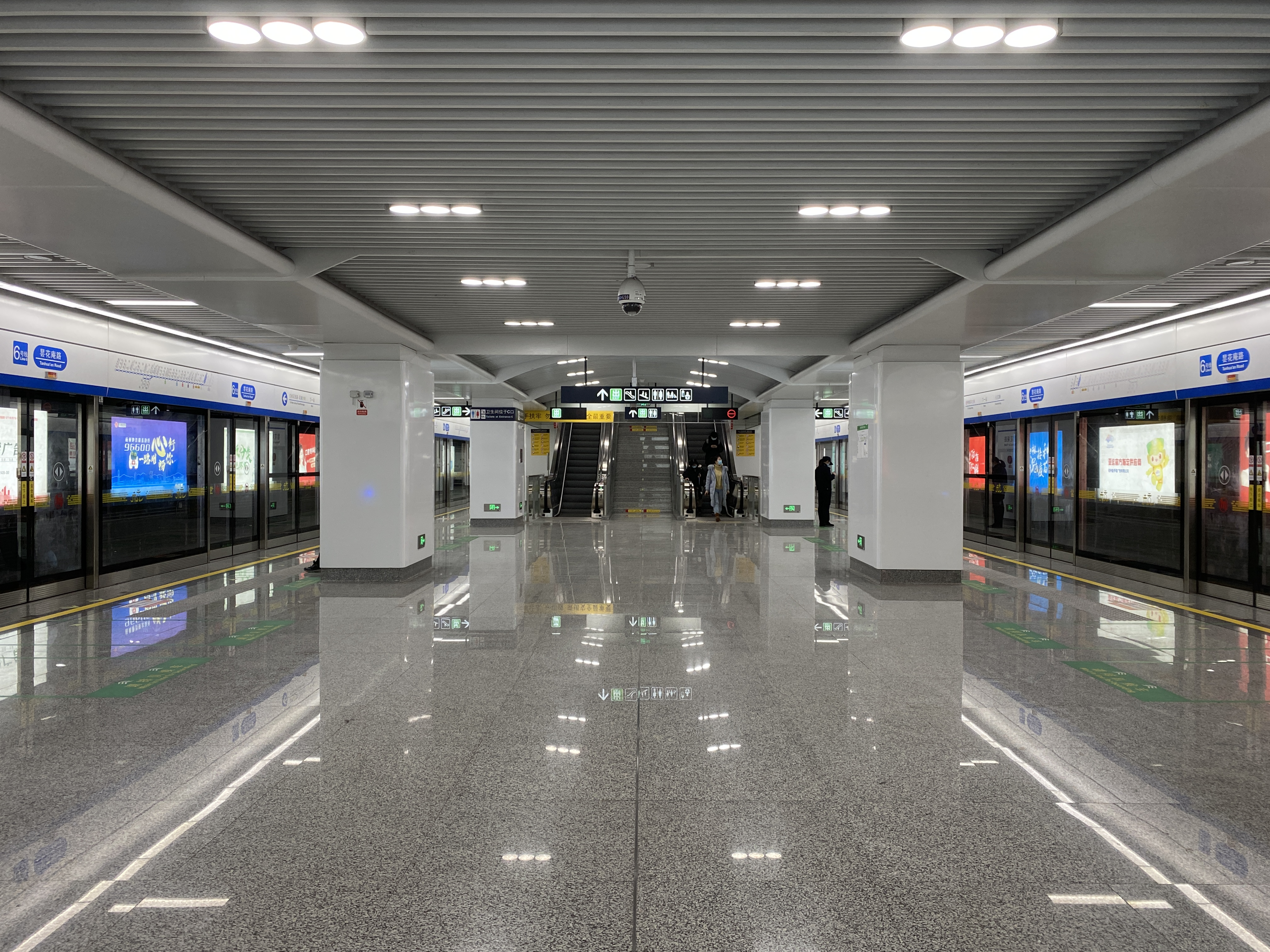
- Platform

General information
- Location: Tanhua'an Road near Erhaogang River (二号港); Shangcheng District, Hangzhou, Zhejiang; China
- Coordinates: 30°16′44″N 120°13′06″E
- Operated by: Hangzhou Metro Corporation
- Line: Line 6
- Platforms: 2 (1 island platform)

History
- Opened: 6 November 2021

Services
Preceding station	Hangzhou Metro	Following station
Sanbao towards West Guihua Road or Shuangpu	Line 6	Yuanbaotang towards Goujulong
Location

Tanhua'an Rooad (simplified Chinese: 昙花庵路; traditional Chinese: 曇花庵路) is a metro station on Line 6 of the Hangzhou Metro in China. It is located in Shangcheng District of Hangzhou, the capital city of the Chinese province of Zhejiang. It opened on 6 November 2021.

== Station layout ==
Tanhua'an Road has three levels: a reserved space for underground mall, a concourse, and an island platform with two tracks for line 6.

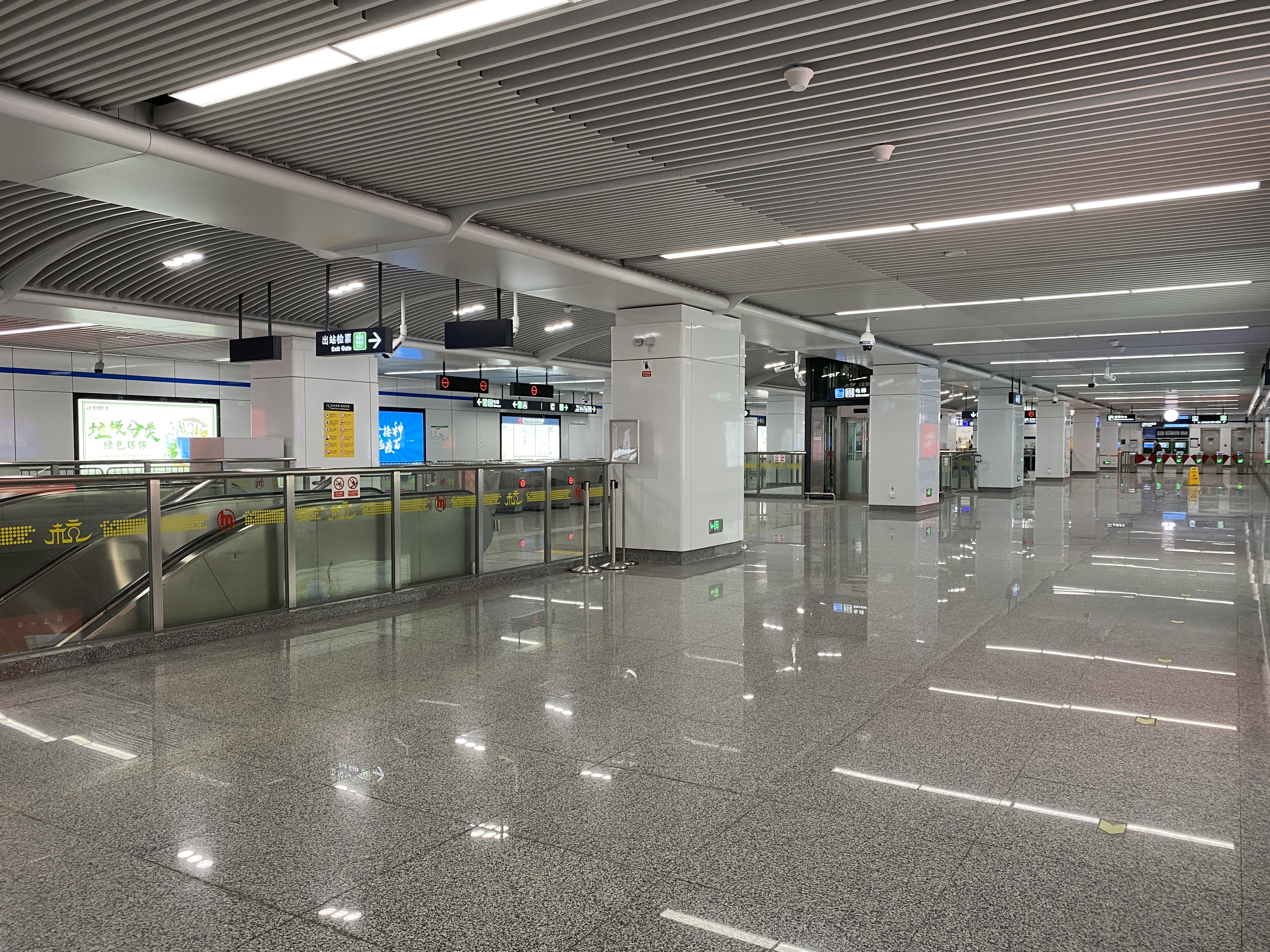
Concourse

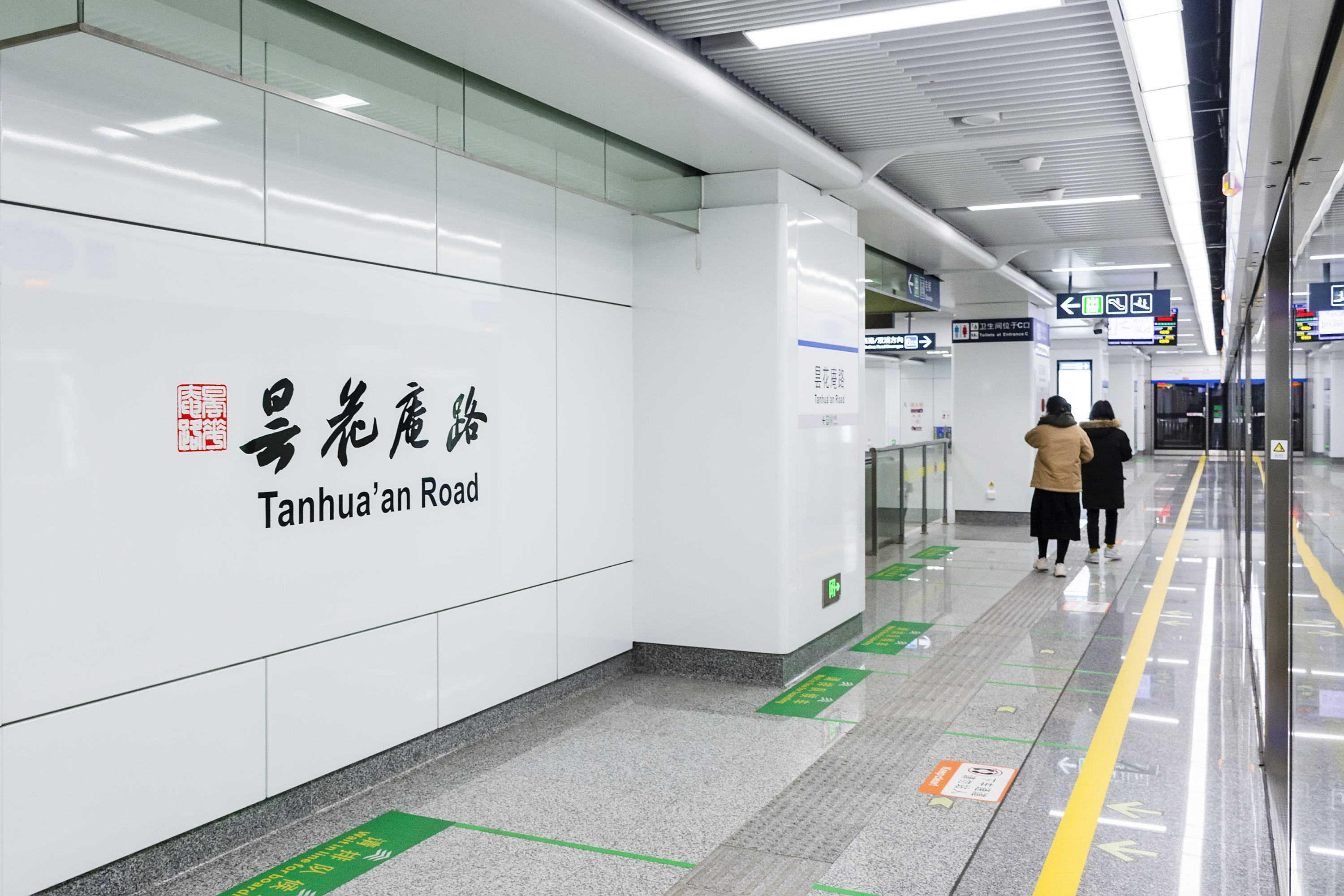
Station name in Chinese calligraphy

=== Entrances/exits ===
- A: north side of Tanhua'an Road
- B: opening soon
- C: Zhutang Road (筑塘路), Shengyun Street (盛运街)
- D: south side of Tanhua'an Road, Yunhe Road (E)
