= Fuyang Coach Center station =

Metro station in Hangzhou, China

Fuyang Coach Center 富阳客运中心
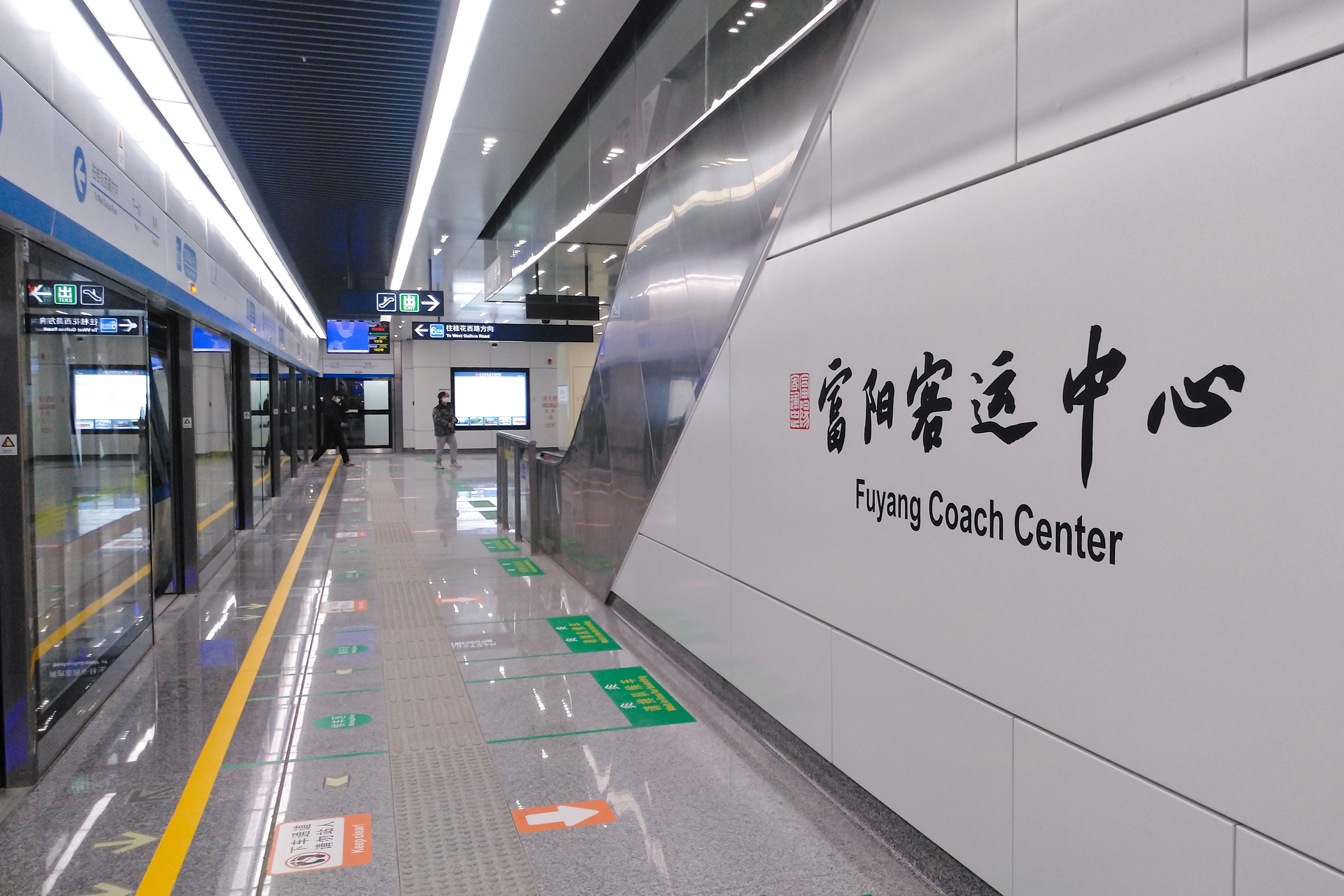

General information
- Location: Fuyang District, Hangzhou, Zhejiang; China
- Coordinates: 30.11386°N 119.93205°E
- Operator: Hangzhou Metro Corporation
- Line: Line 6

Other information
- Station code: FYK

History
- Opened: 30 December 2020

Services
Preceding station	Hangzhou Metro	Following station
Gaoqiao towards West Guihua Road	Line 6	Shouxiang towards Goujulong
Location

Fuyang Coach Center (Chinese: 富阳客运中心) is a metro station on Line 6 of the Hangzhou Metro in China. It was opened on 30 December 2020, together with the Line 6. It is located in the Fuyang District of Hangzhou.

== Gallery ==
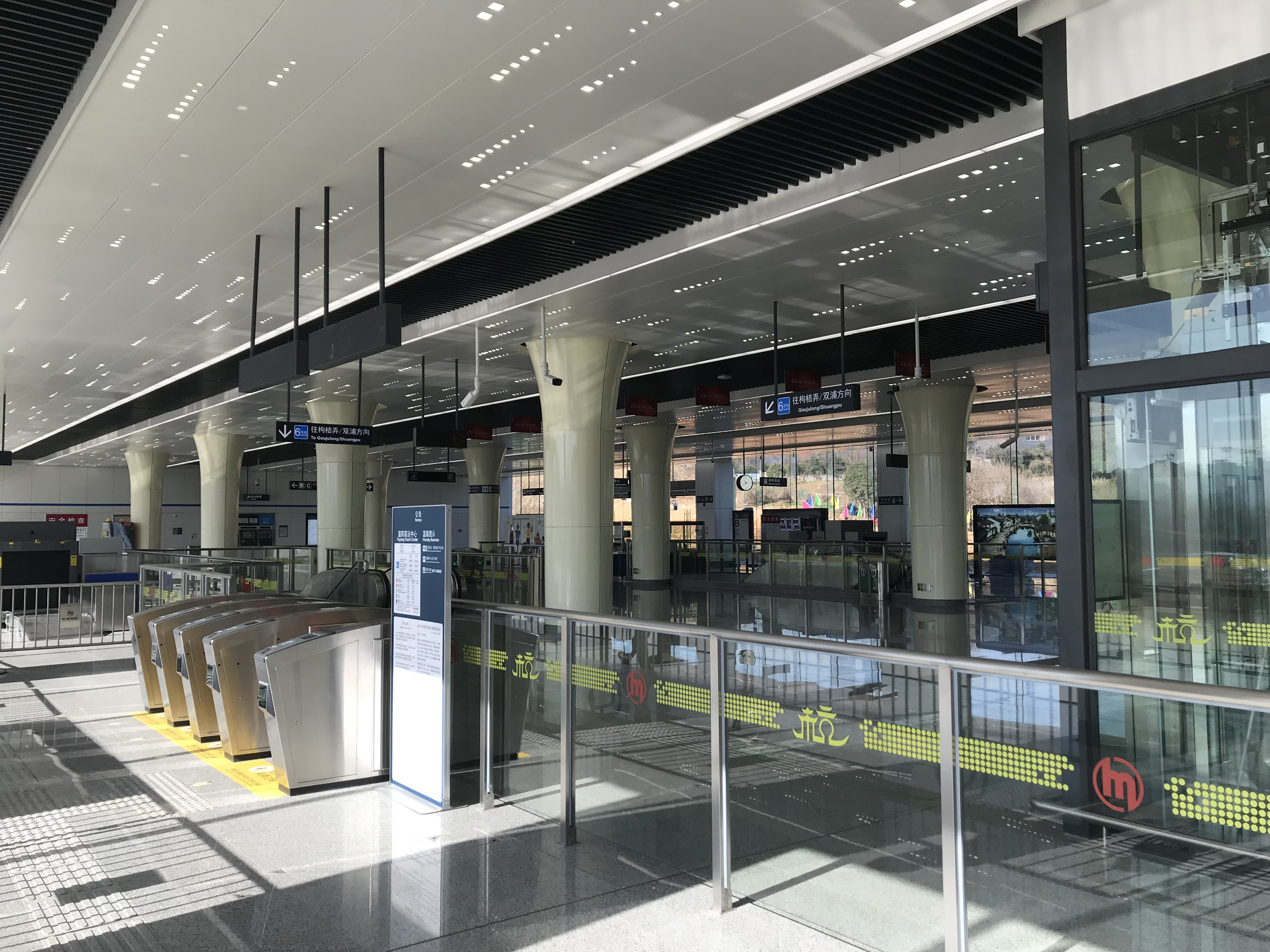
Station entrance

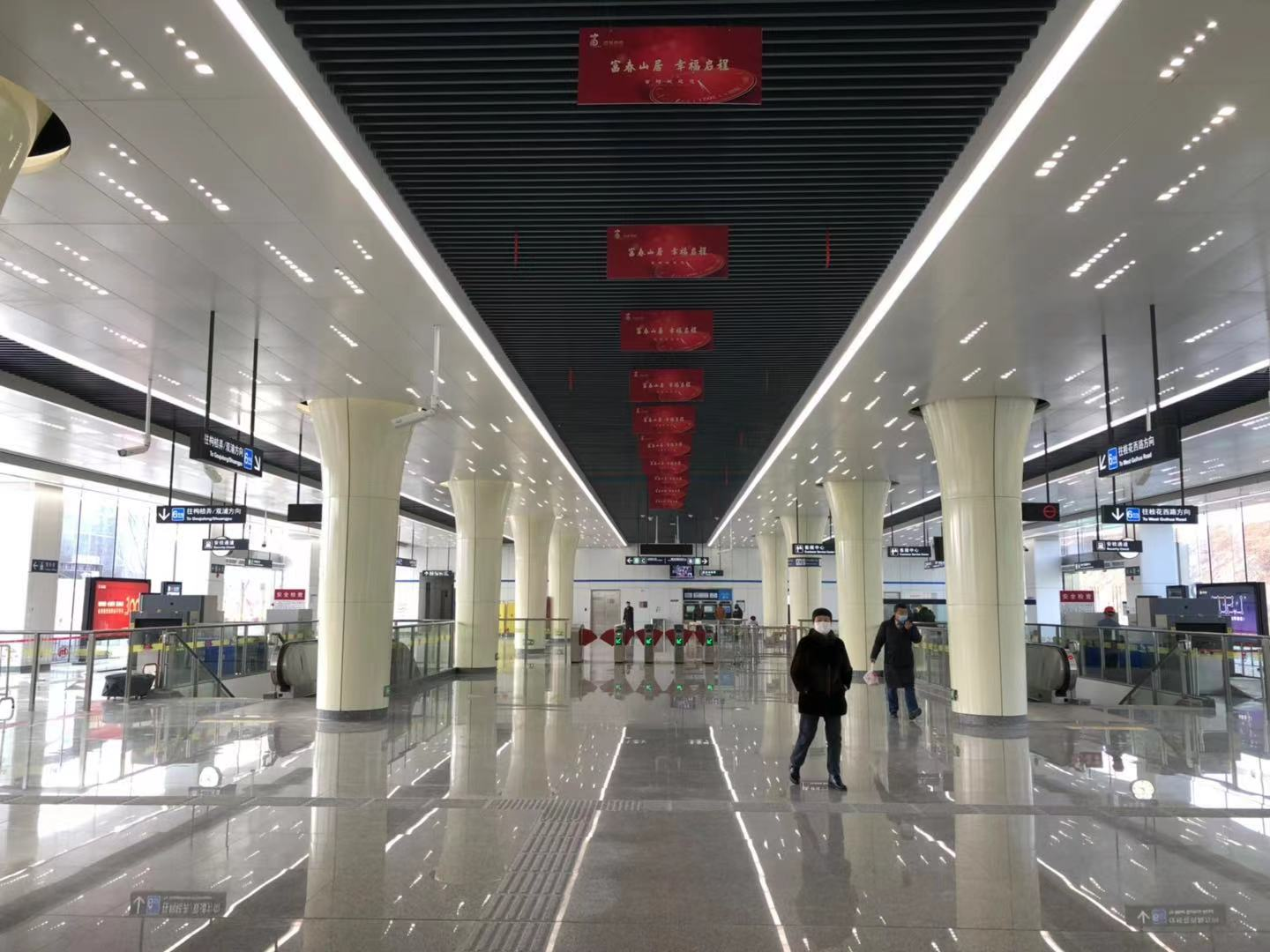
Concourse

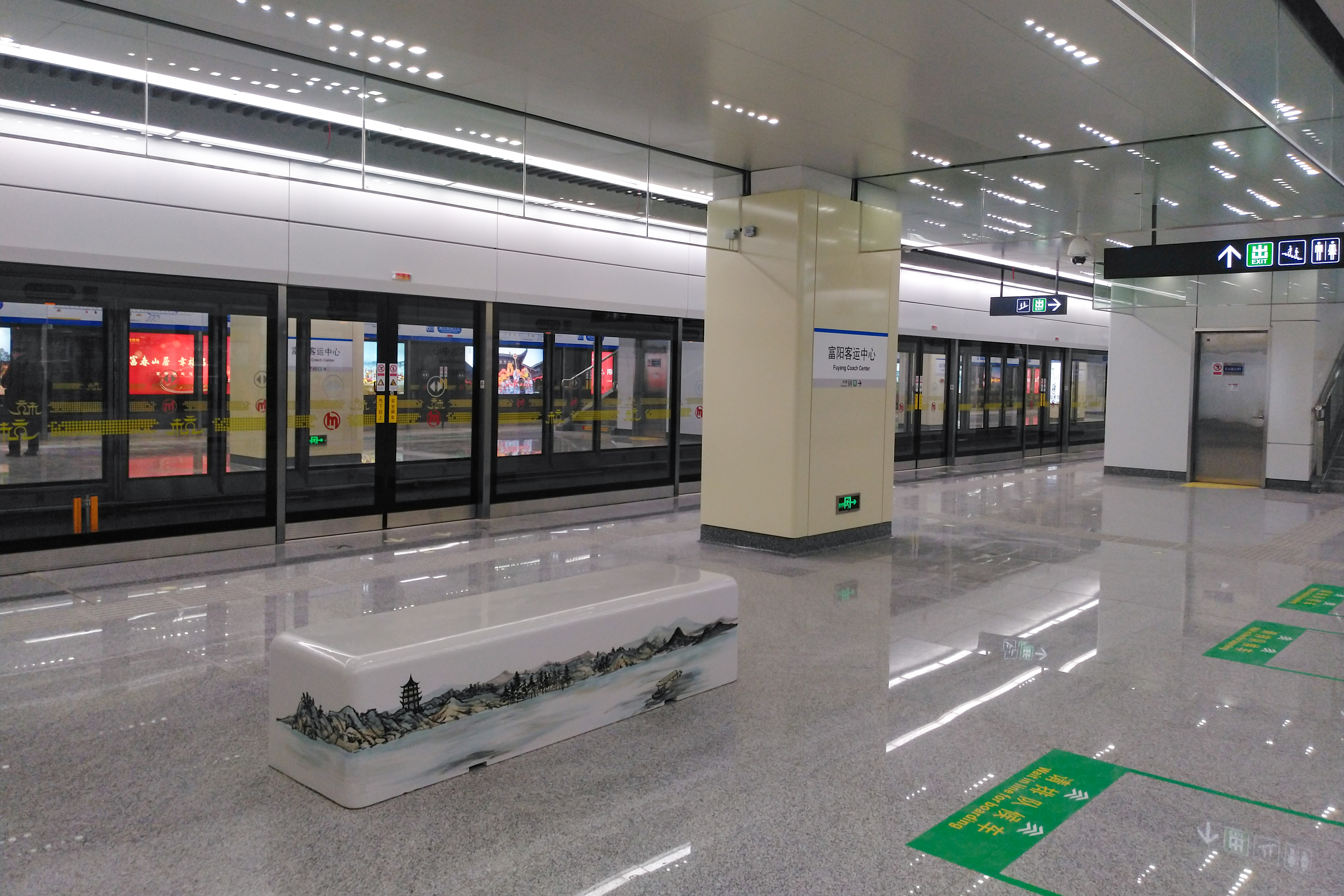
The platform in the foreground is used for stocking trains. Passengers wishing to take trains in the opposite direction should go through the concourse instead of waiting at the opposite platform.
