= Xingmin station =

Metro station in China

Coordinates: 30.2155°N 120.2191°E

Xingmin 星民
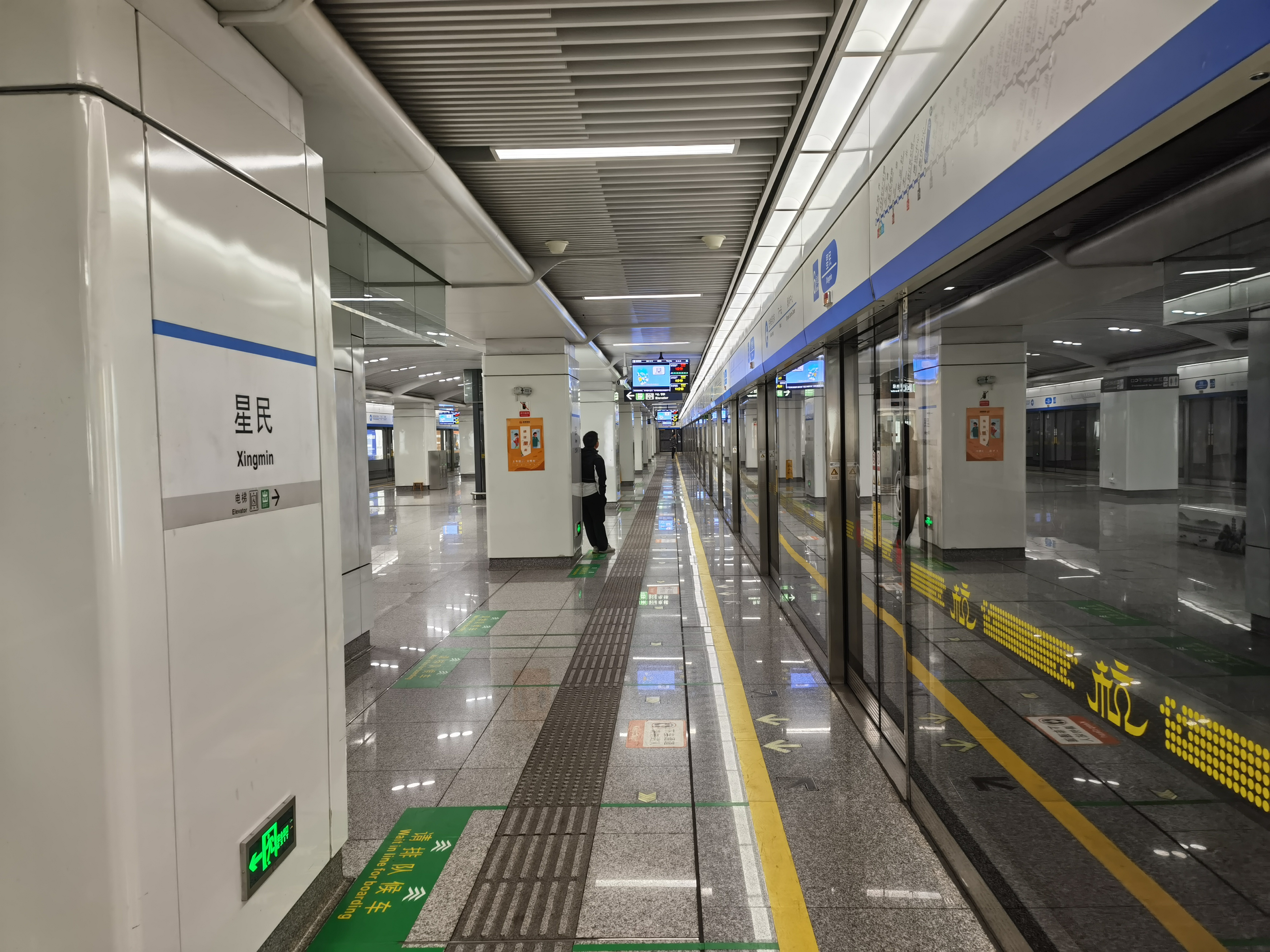

General information
- Location: Binjiang District, Hangzhou, Zhejiang; China
- Operator: Hangzhou Metro Corporation
- Line: Line 6
- Platforms: 2 (1 island platform)

History
- Opened: 30 December 2020

Services
| Preceding station | Hangzhou Metro | Following station |
|---|---|---|
| Jiangling Road towards West Guihua Road or Shuangpu | Line 6 | Olympic Sports Center towards Goujulong |
Location

Xingmin (Chinese: 星民) is a metro station on Line 6 of the Hangzhou Metro in China. Opened on 30 December 2020, it is located in the Binjiang District of Hangzhou, the capital city of the Chinese province of Zhejiang.
