= Zhijiang Culture Center station =

Metro station in Hangzhou, China

Zhijiang Culture Center 之江文化中心
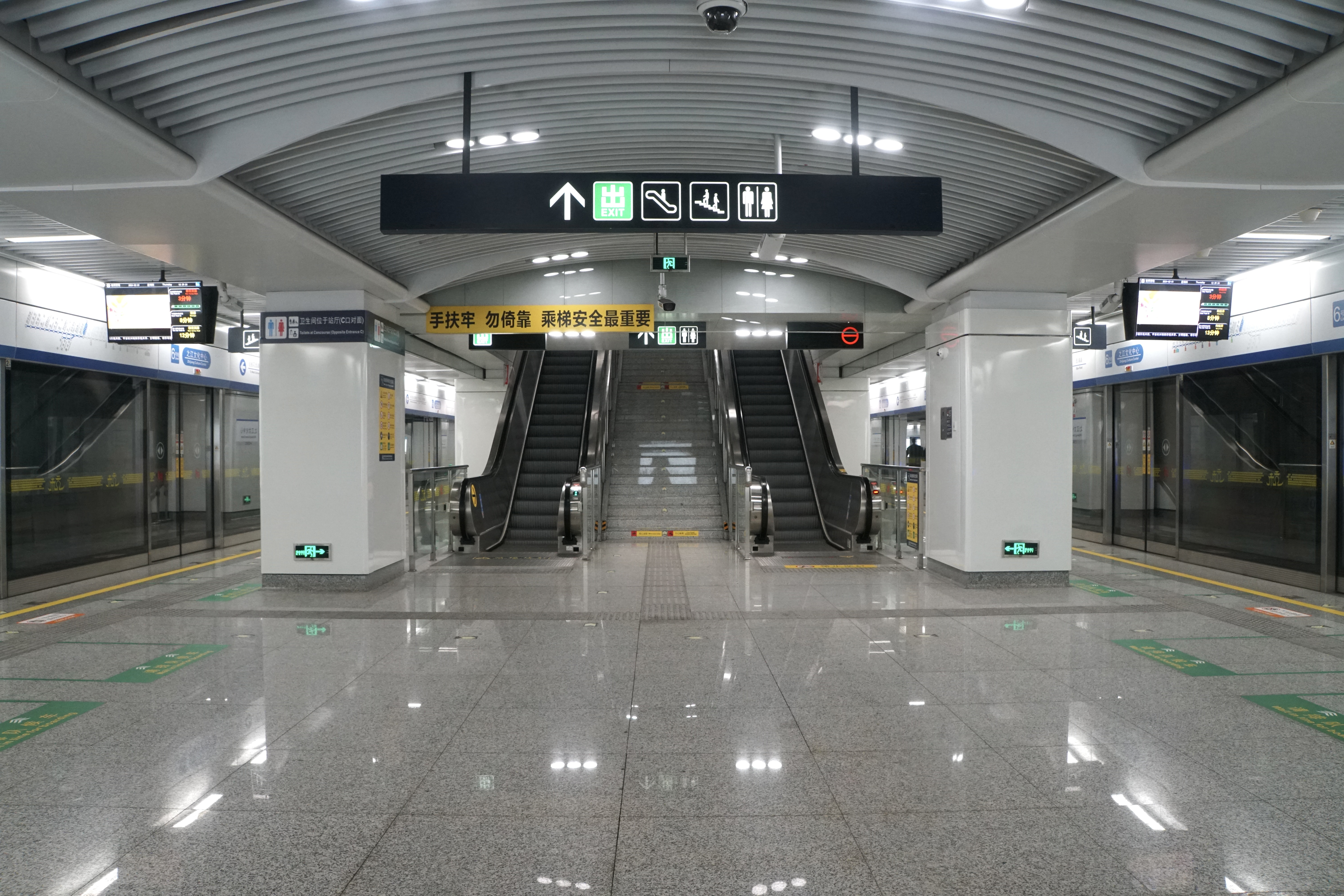

General information
- Location: Xihu District, Hangzhou, Zhejiang; China
- Coordinates: 30.160205°N 120.102836°E
- Operated by: Hangzhou Metro Corporation
- Line(s): Line 6

History
- Opened: 29 April 2021
- Previous names: Zhijiang Ocean Park station (project name), Zhipu Road (until 1 February 2024)

Services
Preceding station	Hangzhou Metro	Following station
West Fenghua Road towards West Guihua Road or Shuangpu	Line 6	Xipu Road towards Goujulong

Zhijiang Culture Center station (Chinese: 之江文化中心) is a metro station on Line 6 of the Hangzhou Metro in China. Opened on 29 April 2021, it is located in the Xihu District of Hangzhou.

The station's name was initially Zhipu Road (Chinese: 之浦路) until a change of name was announced on 1 February 2024.
