= Yuanbaotang station =

Metro station in China

Yuanbaotang 元宝塘
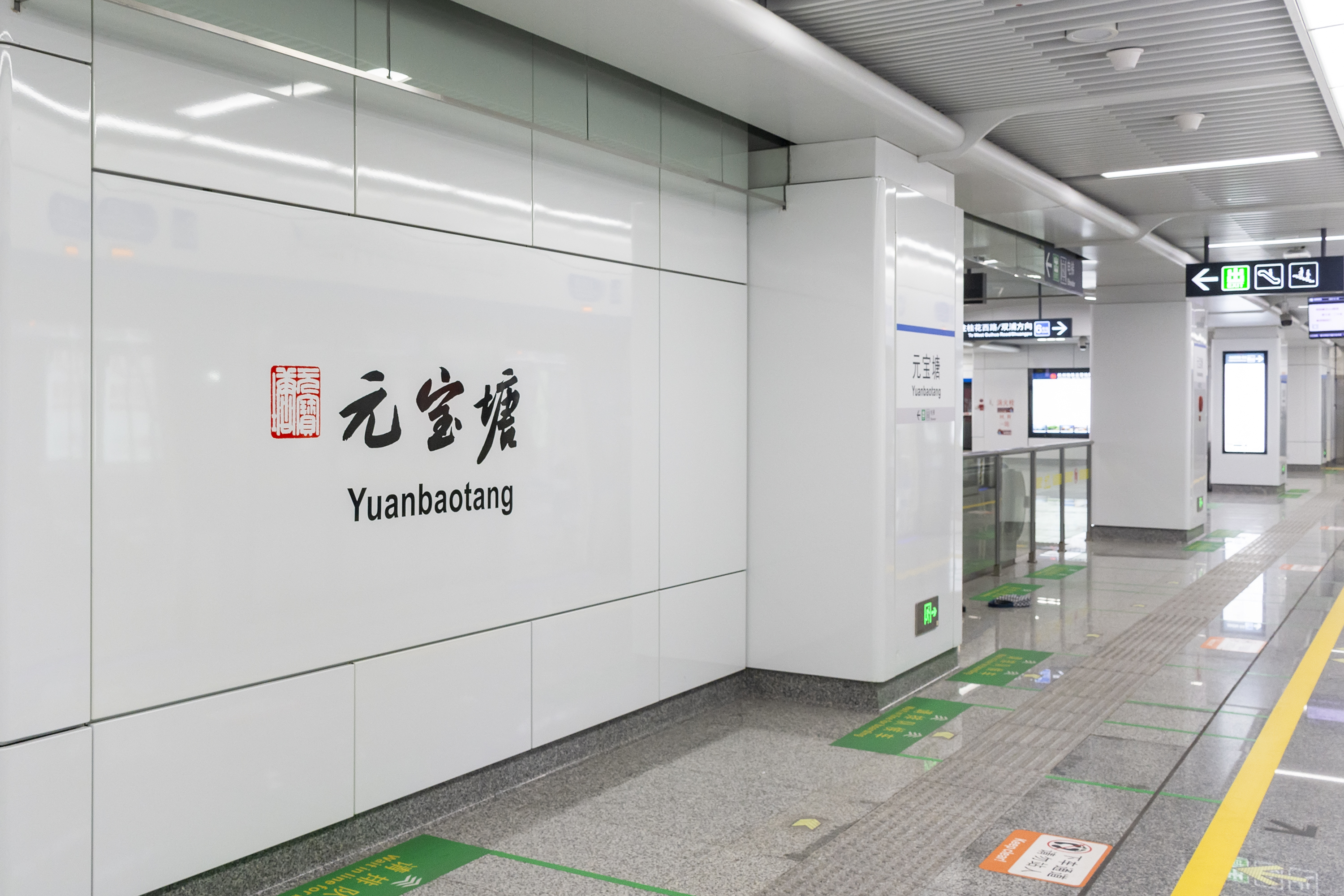
- Name board

General information
- Location: Shangcheng District, Hangzhou, Zhejiang; China
- Coordinates: 30°17′11.483″N 120°12′57.769″E
- Operated by: Hangzhou Metro Corporation
- Line(s): Line 6
- Platforms: 2 (1 island platform)

History
- Opened: 6 November 2021

Services
Preceding station	Hangzhou Metro	Following station
Tanhua'an Road towards West Guihua Road or Shuangpu	Line 6	East Railway Station (East Square) towards Goujulong

Yuanbaotang (Chinese: 元宝塘) is a metro station on Line 6 of the Hangzhou Metro in Hangzhou, the capital city of Zhejiang province, China. The station is located in Shangcheng District of Hangzhou. It opened on 6 November 2021.
