= Shouxiang station =

Metro station in Hangzhou, China

Shouxiang 受降
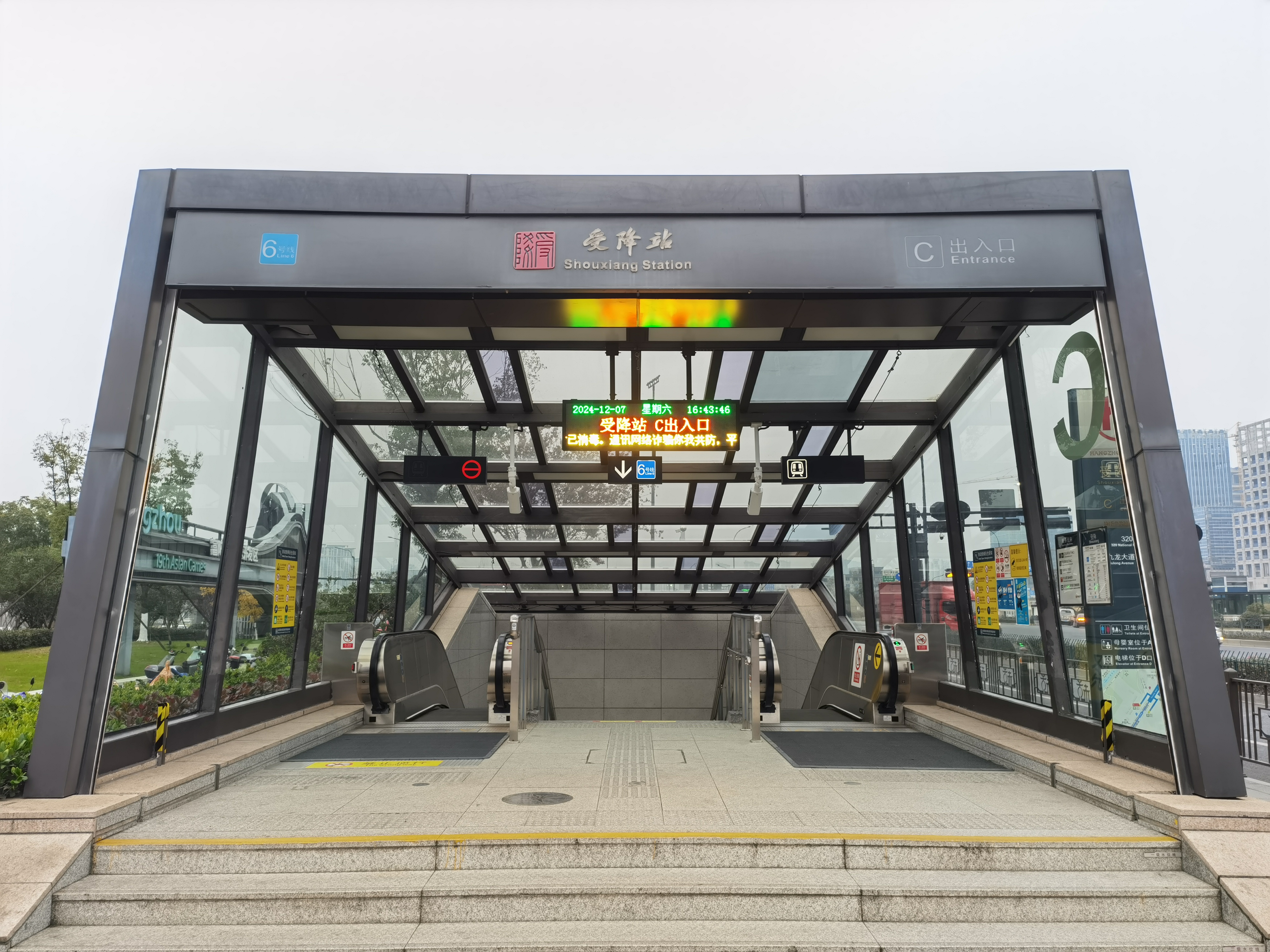
- Entrance C

General information
- Location: Fuyang District, Hangzhou, Zhejiang; China
- Coordinates: 30°7′29.71″N 119°57′22.21″E
- Operator: Hangzhou Metro Corporation
- Line: Line 6
- Platforms: 2 (1 island platform)

Other information
- Station code: SXI

History
- Opened: 30 December 2020

Services
Preceding station	Hangzhou Metro	Following station
Fuyang Coach Center towards West Guihua Road	Line 6	Huxiaoxing towards Goujulong
Location

Shouxiang (Chinese: 受降) is a metro station on Line 6 of the Hangzhou Metro in China. It was opened on 30 December 2020, together with the Line 6. It is located in the Fuyang District of Hangzhou, the capital city of Zhejiang province.
