= Changhe station (Hangzhou Metro) =

Metro station in China

Changhe 长河
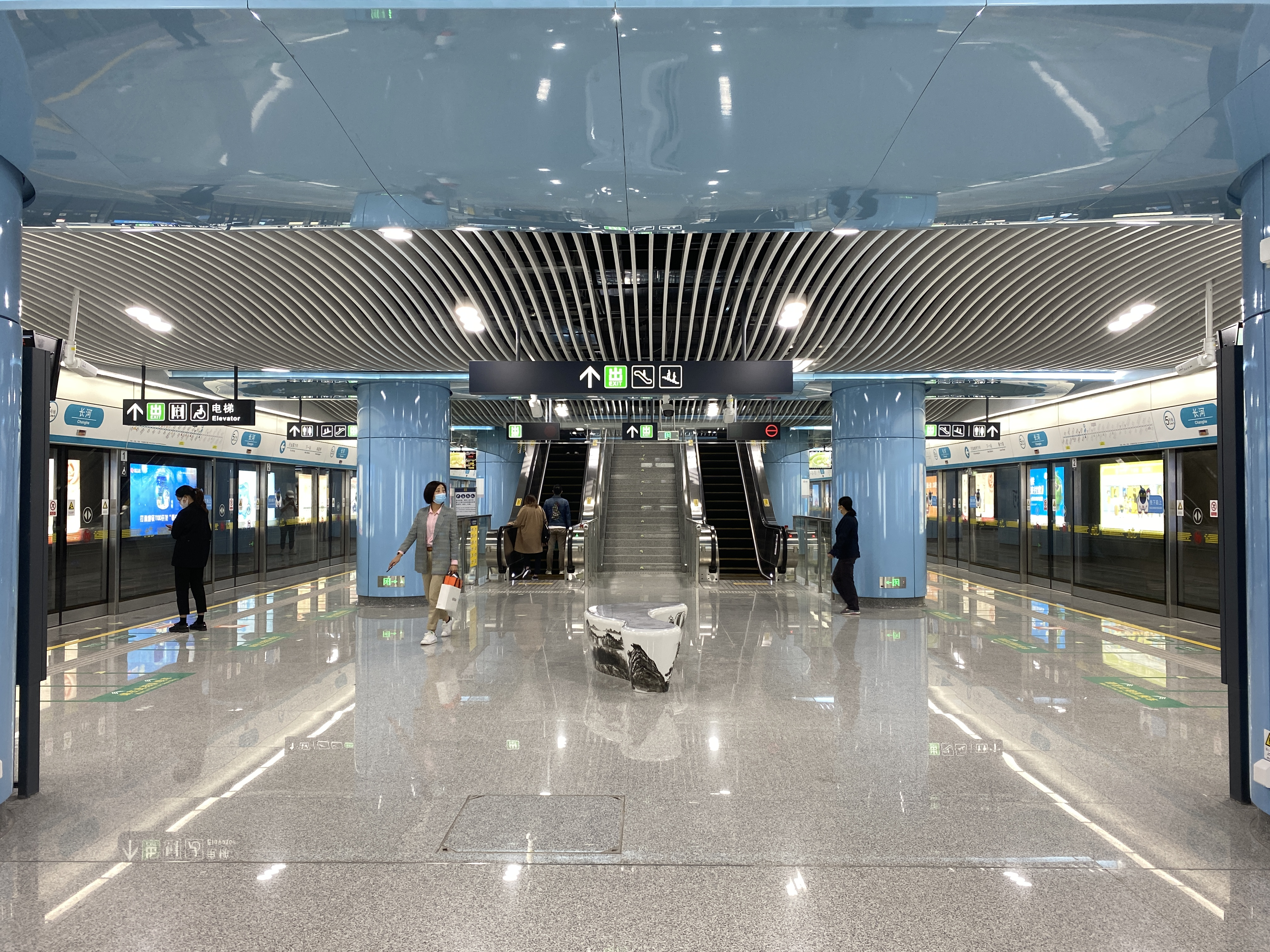
- Platform of Line 5

General information
- Location: Binjiang District, Hangzhou, Zhejiang; China
- Coordinates: 30.1994°N 120.18931°E
- Operator: Hangzhou Metro Corporation
- Lines: Line 5 Line 6
- Platforms: 4 (2 island platforms)

History
- Opened: April 23, 2020 (Line 5); December 30, 2020 (Line 6)

Services
| Preceding station | Hangzhou Metro | Following station |
|---|---|---|
| Nanxingqiao towards East Nanhu | Line 5 | Jucai Road towards Guniangqiao |
| Jianye Road towards West Guihua Road or Shuangpu | Line 6 | Jianghan Road towards Goujulong |
Location

Changhe (Chinese: 长河) is a metro station on Line 5 and Line 6 of the Hangzhou Metro. It is located in the Binjiang District of Hangzhou, the capital city of the Chinese province of Zhejiang.
