= Zhongcun station (Hangzhou Metro) =

Metro station in Hangzhou, China

Zhongcun 中村
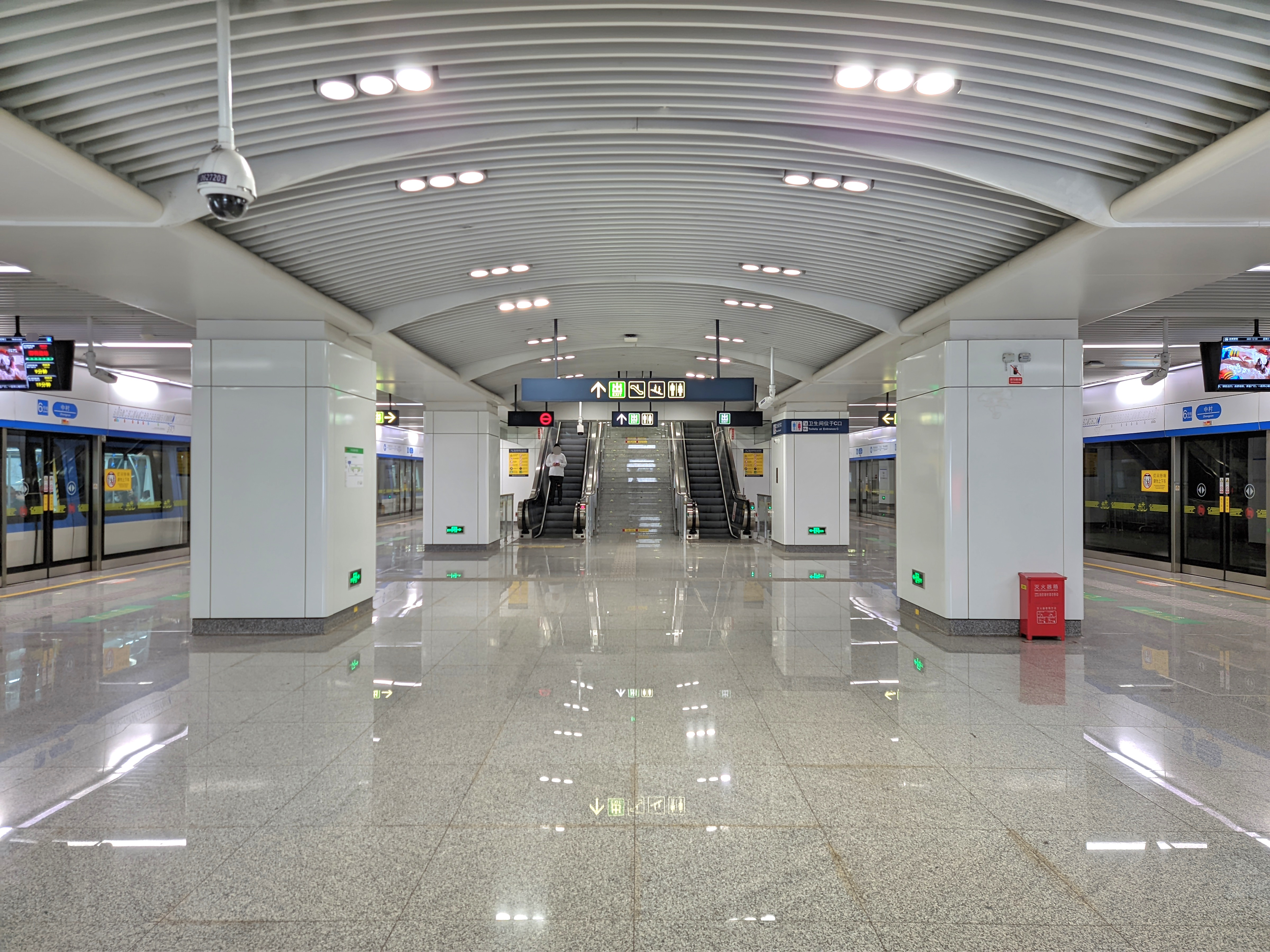
- Platforms

General information
- Location: Xinhaixian (新海线); Xihu District, Hangzhou, Zhejiang; China
- Coordinates: 30°08′58″N 120°02′02″E
- System: Hangzhou Metro
- Operator: Hangzhou Metro Corporation
- Line: Line 6
- Platforms: 2 (1 island platform)

Construction
- Structure type: Underground
- Accessible: Yes

Other information
- Station code: ZHC

History
- Opened: 30 December 2020

Services
Preceding station	Hangzhou Metro	Following station
Yinhu towards West Guihua Road	Line 6	Zhejiang Conservatory of Music towards Goujulong
Location

Zhongcun (Chinese: 中村) is a metro station on Line 6 of the Hangzhou Metro in China. It was opened on 30 December 2020, together with the Line 6. It is located in the Xihu District of Hangzhou.

== Station layout ==
Zhongcun has two levels: a concourse, and an island platform with two tracks for line 6.

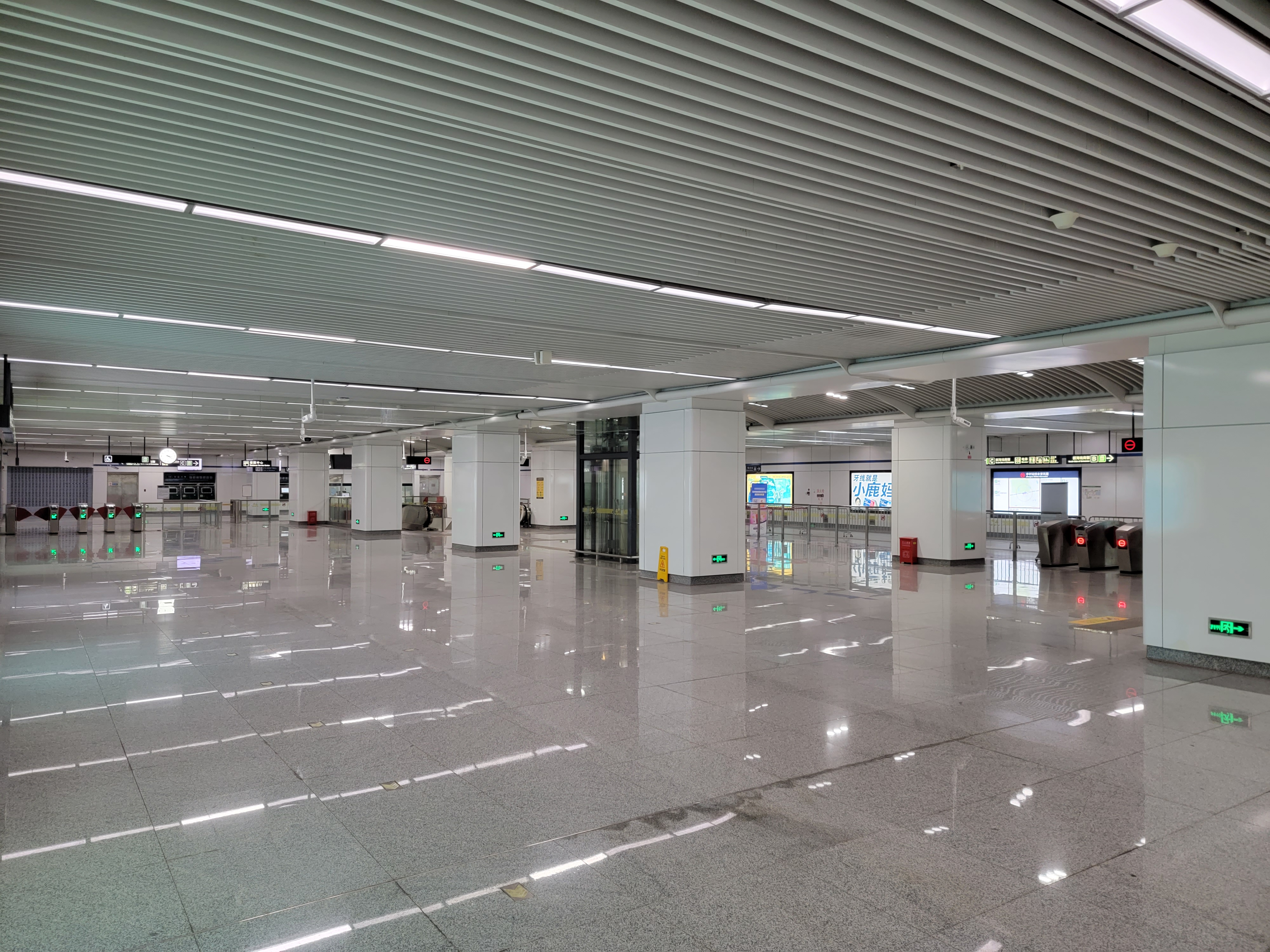
Concourse

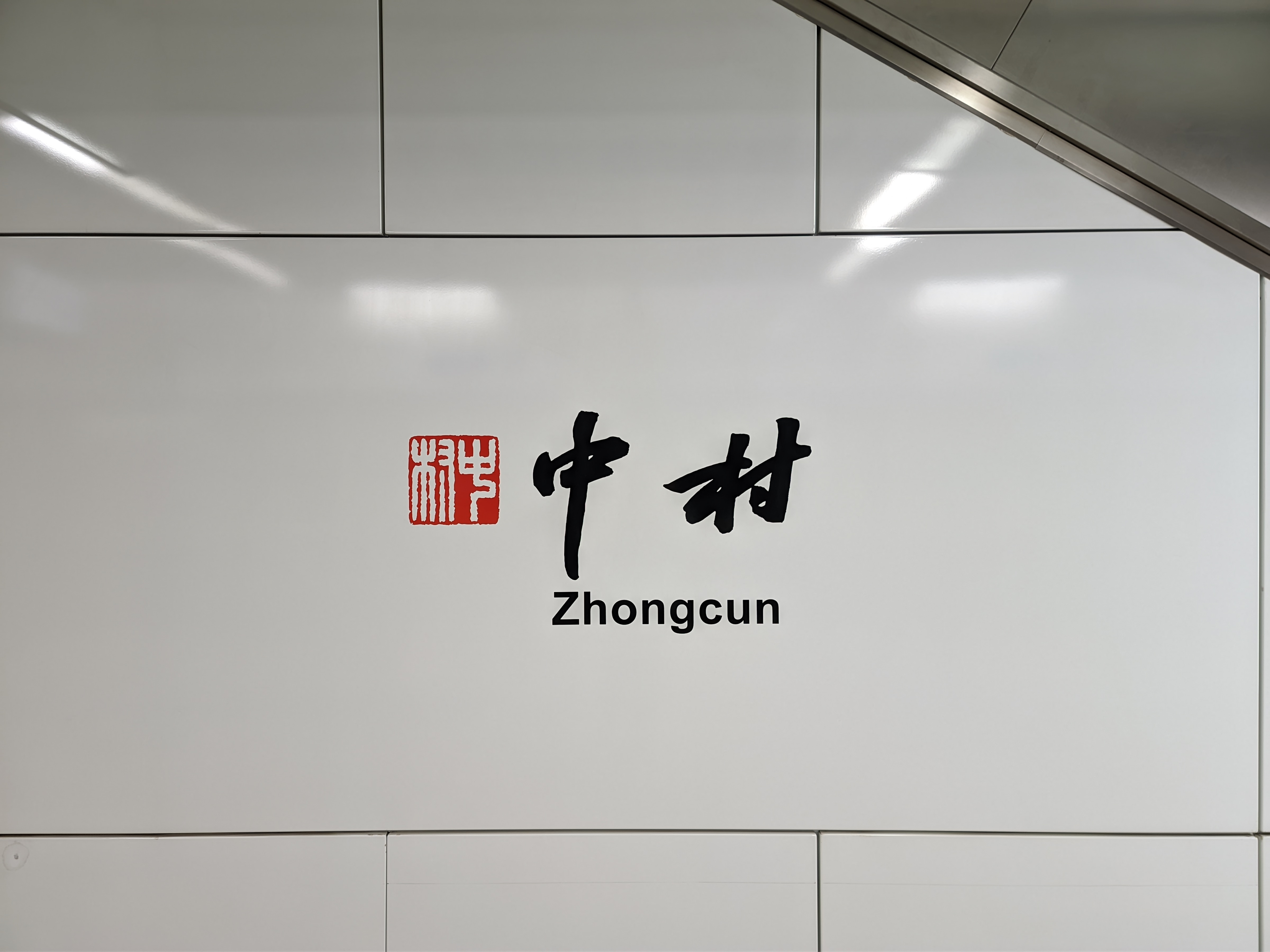
Billboard

== Entrances/exits ==
- A: north side of Xinhaixian
- B: south side of Xinhaixian
- C: south side of Xinhaixian
