= West Fenghua Road station =

Metro station in Hangzhou, China

West Fenghua Road 枫桦西路
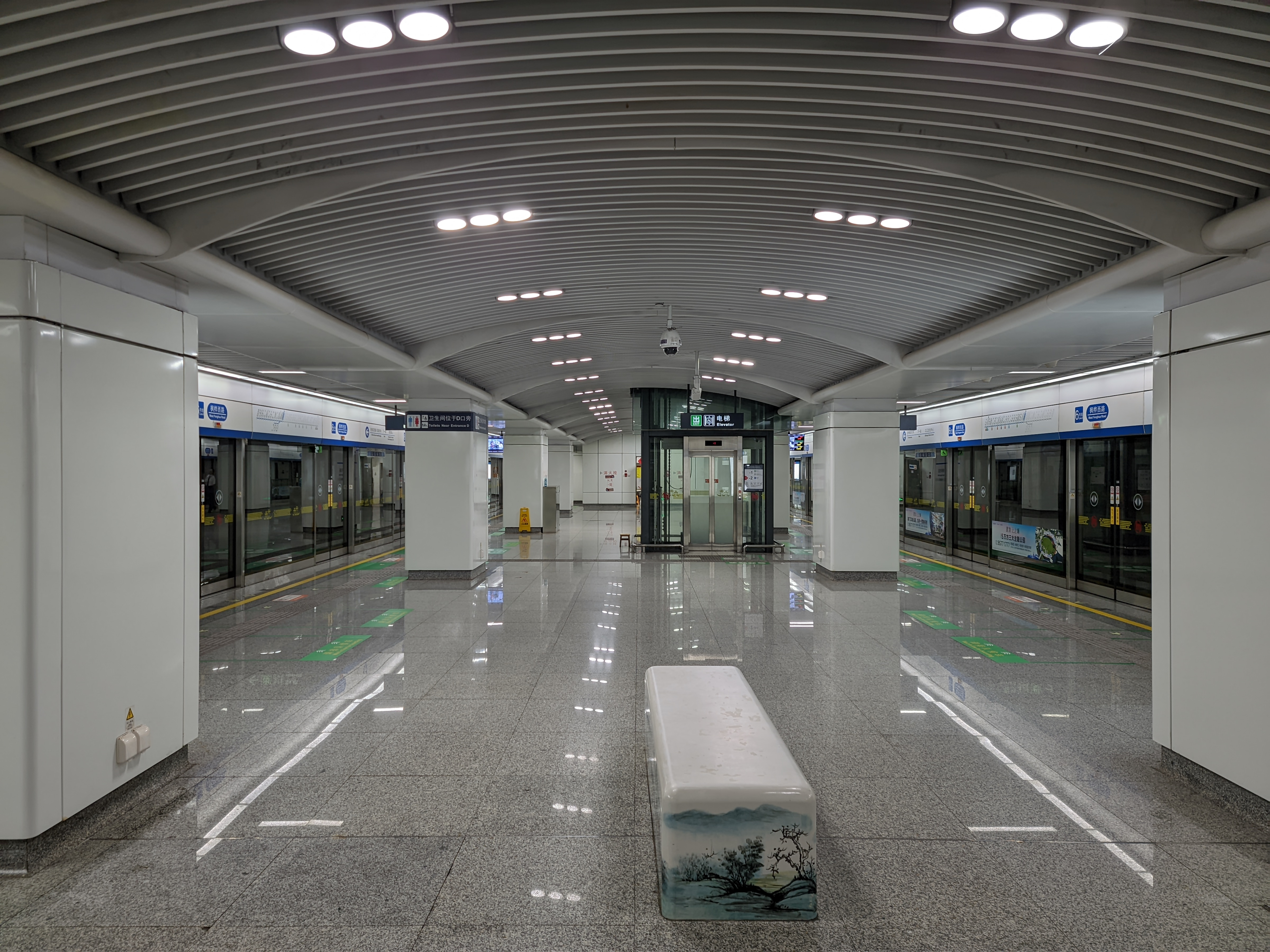
- Platforms

General information
- Location: Jianghan Road (江涵路) × Fenghua Road (枫桦路) / Guchao Alley (固潮巷); Xihu District, Hangzhou, Zhejiang; China
- Coordinates: 30°09′27″N 120°05′39″E
- Operator: Hangzhou Metro Corporation
- Line: Line 6
- Platforms: 2 (1 island platform)

Construction
- Structure type: Underground
- Accessible: Yes

Other information
- Station code: FHX

History
- Opened: 30 December 2020

Services
Preceding station	Hangzhou Metro	Following station
Xiangshan Campus, China Academy of Art towards West Guihua Road or Shuangpu	Line 6	Zhijiang Culture Center towards Goujulong
Location

West Fenghua Road (simplified Chinese: 枫桦西路; traditional Chinese: 楓樺西路) is a metro station on Line 6 of the Hangzhou Metro in China. It was opened on 30 December 2020, together with the Line 6. It is located in Xihu District of Hangzhou.

== Station layout ==
West Fenghua Road has two levels: a concourse, and an island platform with two tracks for line 6.

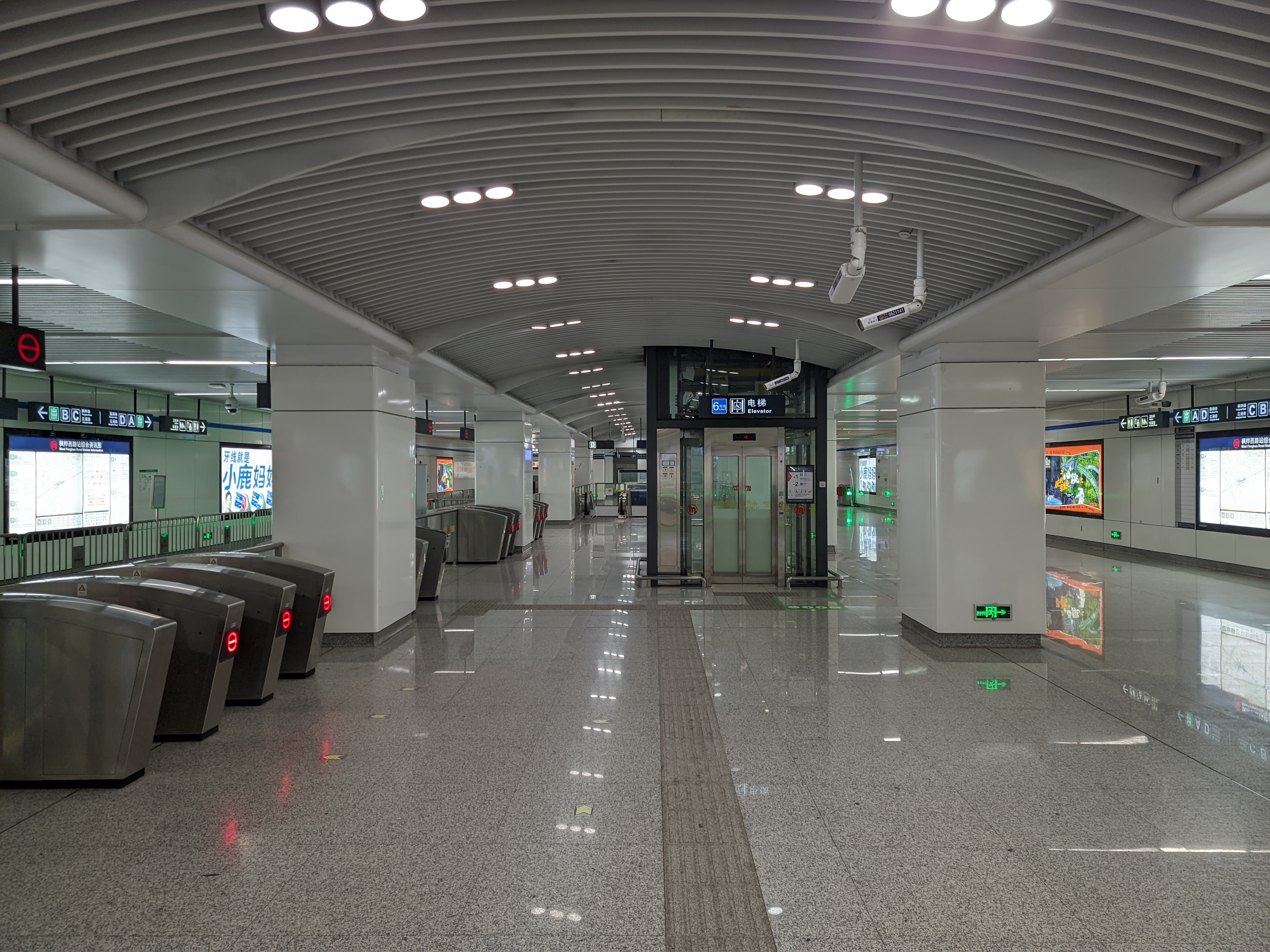
Concourse

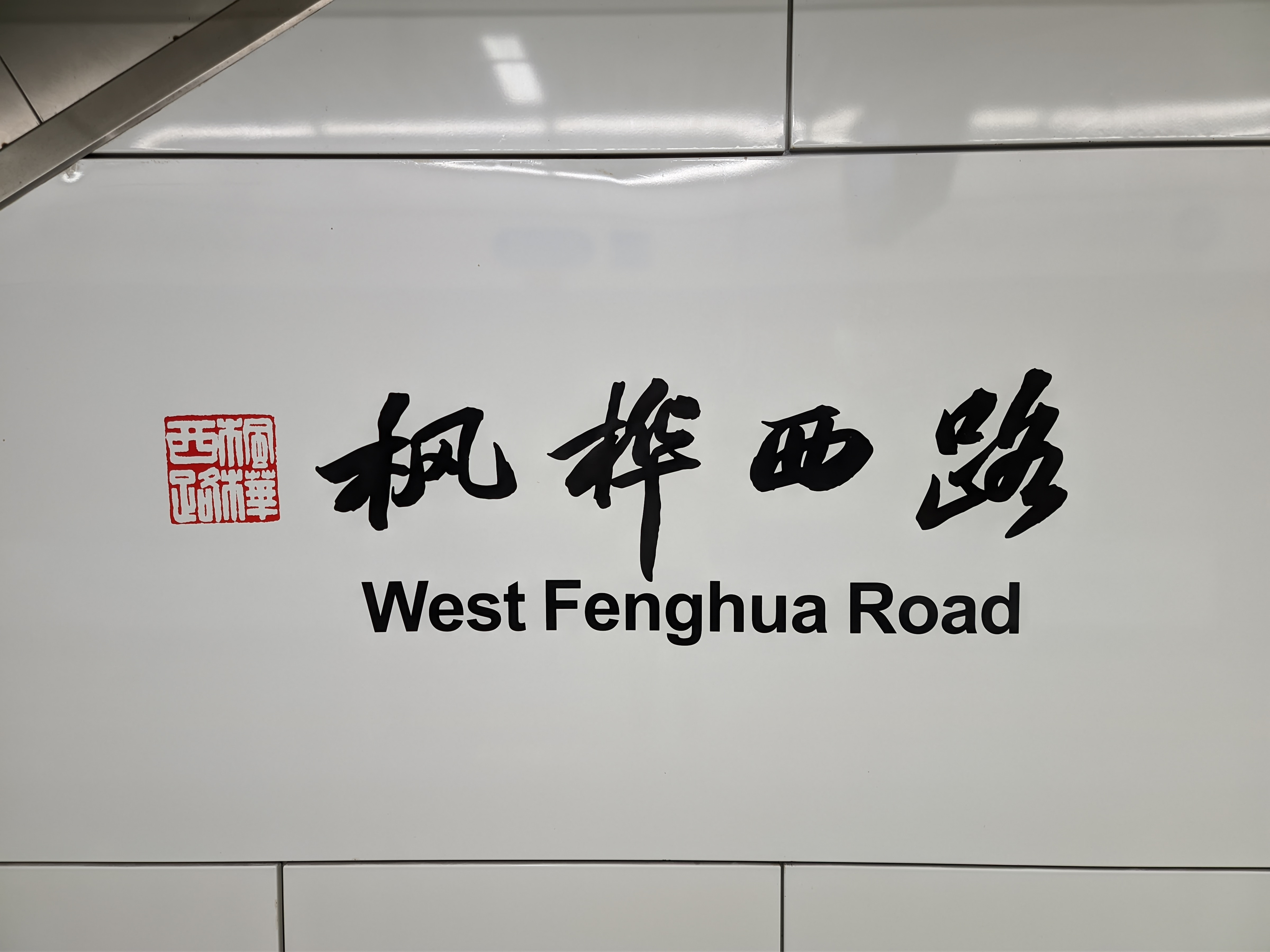
Station name in Chinese calligraphy

=== Entrances/exits ===
- A: north side of Jianghan Road, Guchao Alley
- B1: north side of Jianghan Road, east side of Fenghua Road
- B2: north side of Jianghan Road, west side of Fenghua Road
- C1: south side of Jianghan Road, east side of Fenghua Road
- C2: south side of Jianghan Road, west side of Fenghua Road
- D: south side of Jianghan Road
