= Chengye Road station =

Metro station in China

Chengye Road 诚业路
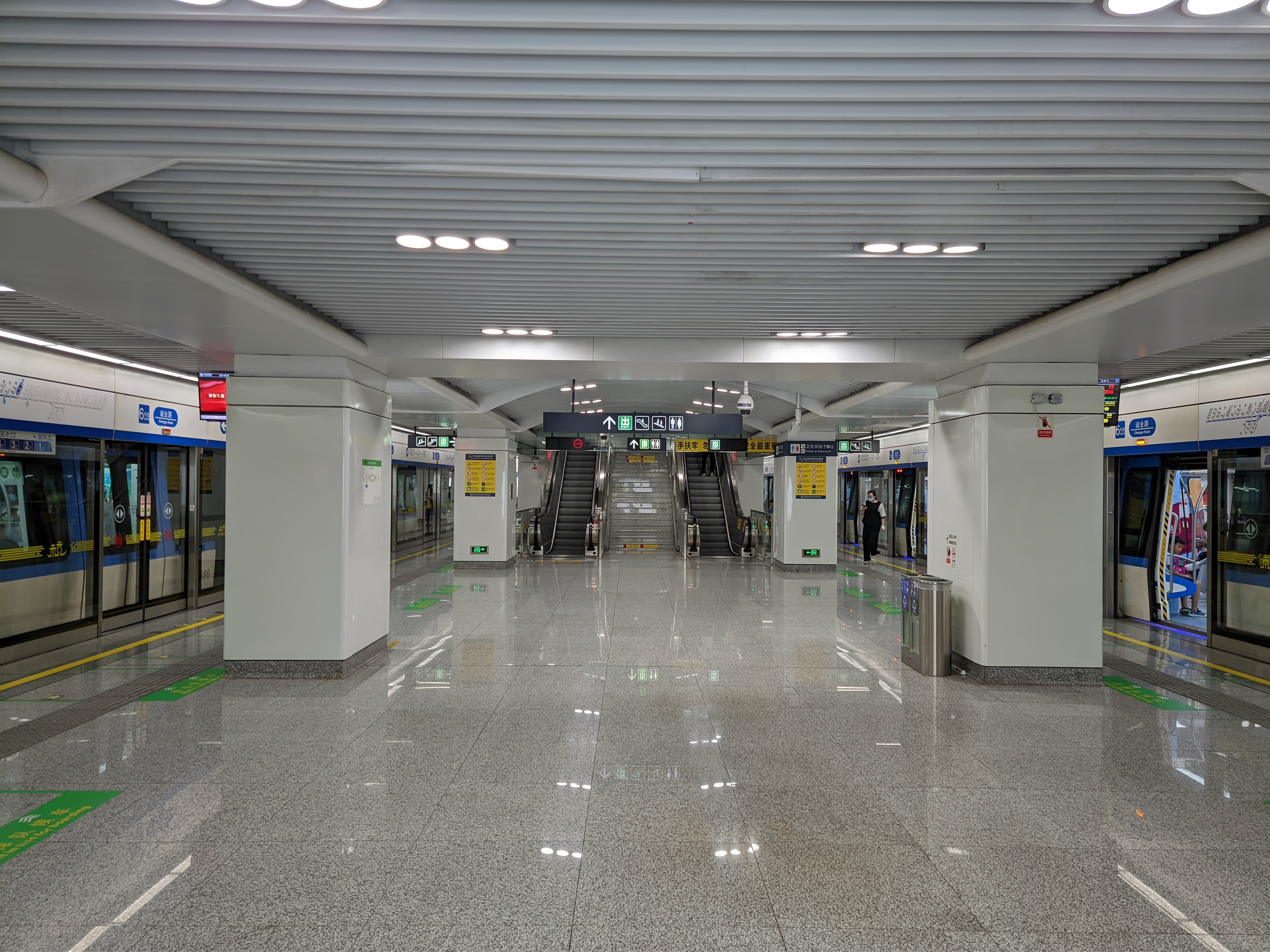

General information
- Location: Binjiang District, Hangzhou, Zhejiang; China
- Coordinates: 30.18899°N 120.16536°E
- Operator: Hangzhou Metro Corporation
- Line: Line 6
- Platforms: 2 (1 island platform)

History
- Opened: 30 December 2020

Services
Preceding station	Hangzhou Metro	Following station
Weiye Road towards West Guihua Road or Shuangpu	Line 6	Jianye Road towards Goujulong
Location

Chengye Road (Chinese: 诚业路) is a metro station on Line 6 of the Hangzhou Metro in China. Opened on 30 December 2020 along with Phase 1 of Line 6, the station is located in Binjiang District of Hangzhou, the capital city of Zhejiang province.
