= Yangbeihu station =

Metro station in Hangzhou, China

Yangbeihu 阳陂湖
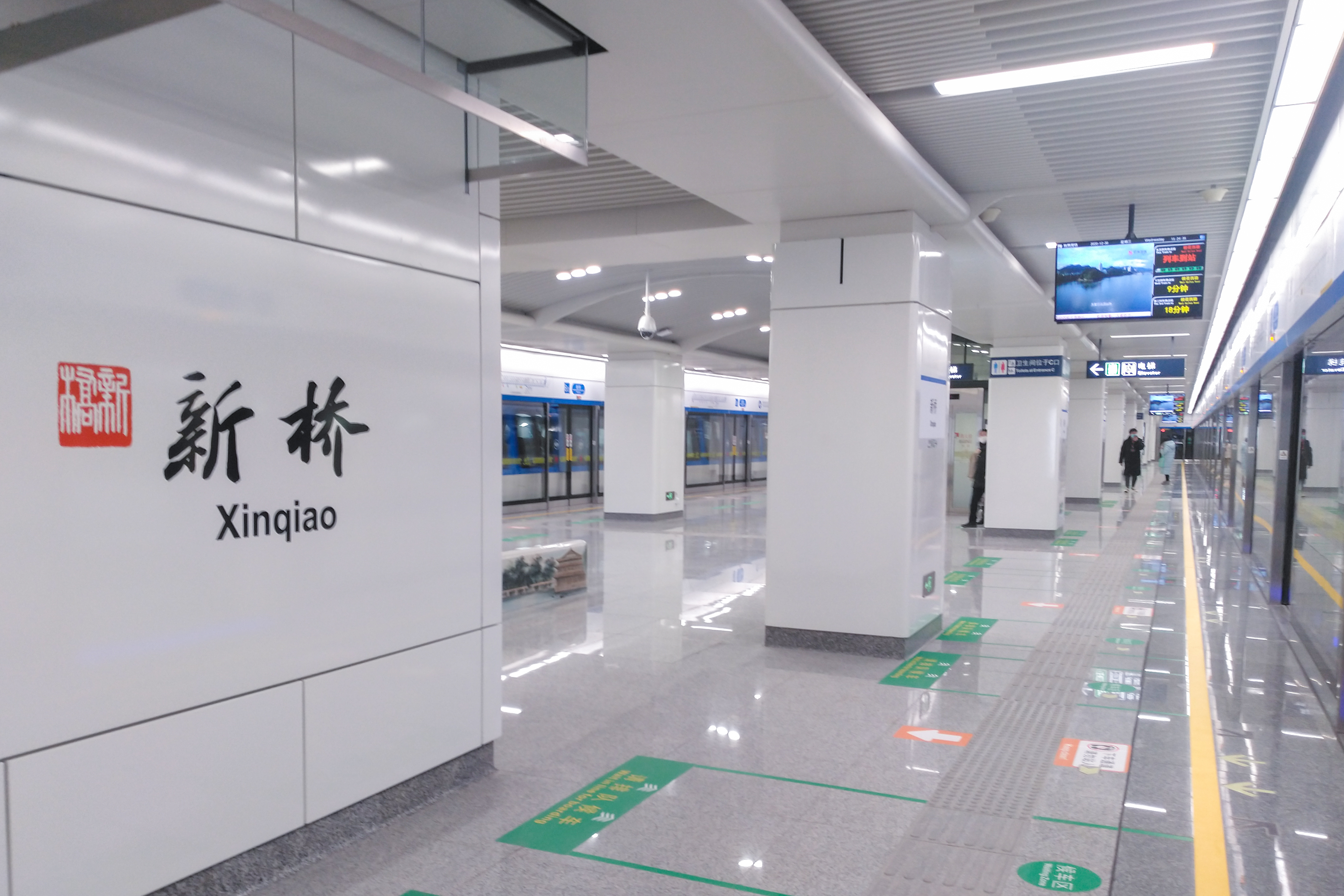
- Platform of Yangbeihu Station, with the name "Xinqiao". The station has changed its name in April 2021.

General information
- Location: Fuyang District, Hangzhou, Zhejiang; China
- Operator: Hangzhou Metro Corporation
- Line: Line 6

Other information
- Station code: YBH

History
- Opened: 30 December 2020
- Former names: Xinqiao

Services
Preceding station	Hangzhou Metro	Following station
Gongwang Street towards West Guihua Road	Line 6	Gaoqiao towards Goujulong
Location

Yangbeihu (Chinese: 阳陂湖), formerly known as Xinqiao (Chinese: 新桥) is a metro station on Line 6 of the Hangzhou Metro in China. It was opened on 30 December 2020, together with the Line 6. The station changed its name from "Xinqiao" to "Yangbeihu" on 30 April 2021. It is located near the Yangbei Lake wetland park in the Fuyang District of Hangzhou, the capital city of Zhejiang province.
