= Yinhu station =

Yinhu station may refer to:

- Yinhu station (Hangzhou Metro), a station on Line 6 of the Hangzhou Metro in Zhejiang, China
- Yinhu station (Shenzhen Metro), a station on Line 6 and Line 9 of the Shenzhen Metro in Guangdong, China
