= YBH =

YBH or ybh may refer to:

- YBH, the station code for Yangbeihu station, Zhejiang, China
- ybh, the ISO 639-3 code for Yakkha language, Nepal and Sikkim
