= GWJ =

GWJ or gwj may refer to:

- GWJ, the station code for Gongwang Street station, Hangzhou, China
- gwj, the ISO 639-3 code for Gǀui dialect, Botswana
