= Line 6 (Hangzhou Metro) =

Metro line of the Hangzhou Metro system in China

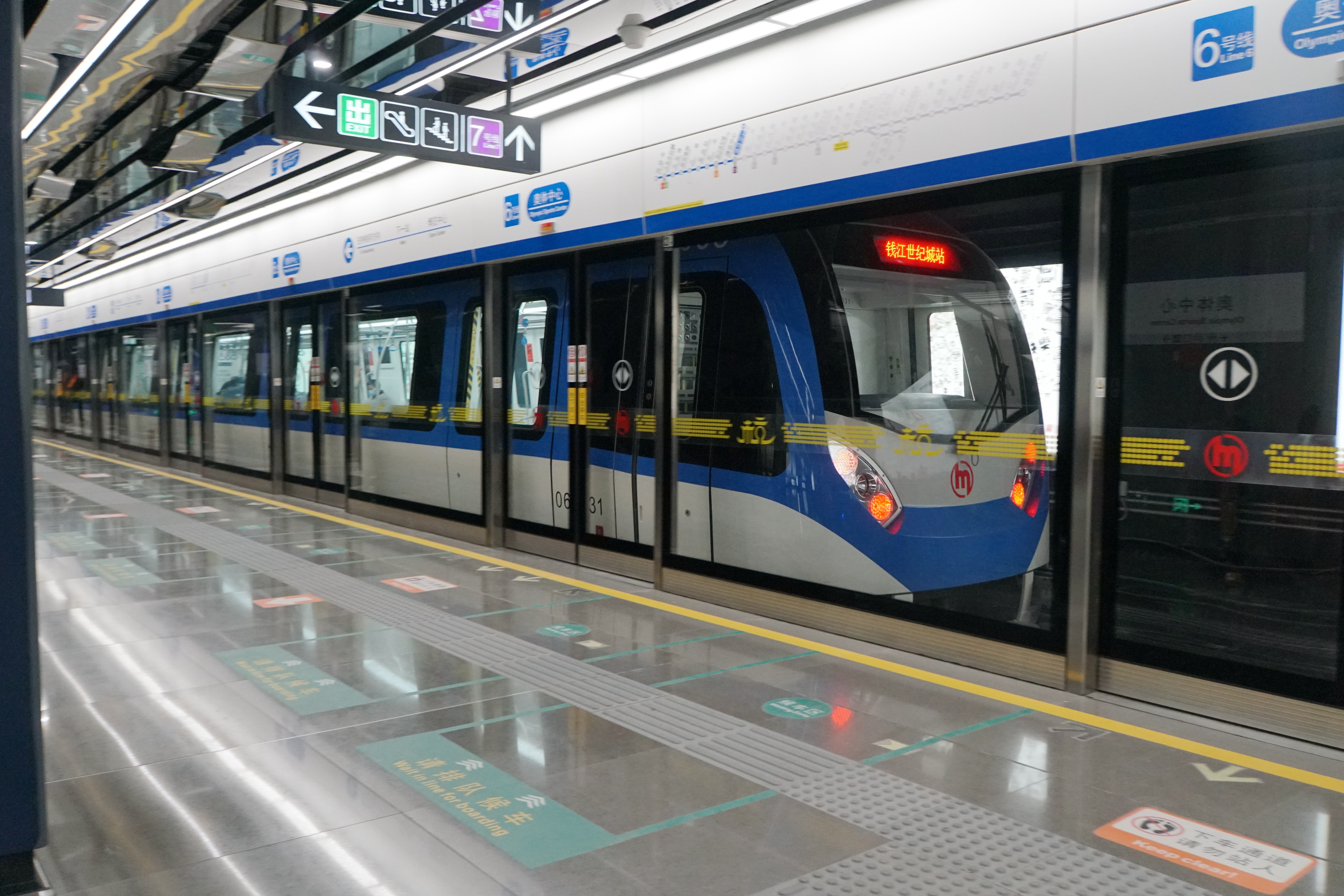
- Train of Line 6 is departing from Olympic Sports Center station

Overview
- Status: Partially operational
- Owner: City of Hangzhou
- Locale: Hangzhou, Zhejiang, China
- Termini: Goujulong; Shuangpu / West Guihua Road
- Stations: 36

Service
- Type: Rapid transit
- System: Hangzhou Metro
- Services: 2
- Operator(s): Hangzhou Metro Corporation
- Depot(s): Shuangpu Depot; Fengbei Stabling Yard; Songjiatang Depot
- Rolling stock: PM119; PM146

History
- Opened: 30 December 2020; 5 years ago

Technical
- Line length: 58.5 km (36.4 mi) (Phase 1: 27.0 km, Phase 2: 8.3 km, Fuyang: 23.2 km)
- Character: Underground
- Track gauge: 1,435 mm (4 ft 8 1/2 in)
- Electrification: Overhead, 1500 V DC
- Operating speed: 100 km/h (62 mph)

Line 6
- Simplified Chinese: 杭州地铁六号线
- Traditional Chinese: 杭州地鐵六號線
Transcriptions
Standard Mandarin
- Hanyu Pinyin: Hǎngzhōu Dìtiě Lìuhào Xiàn

Line 6 drawn to scale.

Line 6 (Chinese: 杭州地铁6号线) is a subway line of the Hangzhou Metro, in Zhejiang, China. The line runs from Shuangpu (in Xihu District) and West Guihua Road (in Fuyang District), merging at Xiangshan Campus, China Academy of Art station, stretching through the south bank of Qiantang River before turning northwest and ending at Goujulong. It connects Fuyang District with Binjiang District, Hangzhou Olympic Expo Center, Qianjiang Century City and Hangzhou East railway station. The line is 58.75 km (36.51 mi) long.

Phase 1 and Fuyang Section was opened on 30 December 2020. Phase 2 opened on 6 November 2021. The line's color is blue. In future planning, the stations from Shuangpu to Xiaming Street will merge to Line 12.

== Opening timeline ==
| Segment | Commencement | Length | Station(s) | Name |
|---|---|---|---|---|
| Shuangpu — Qianjiang Century City | 30 December 2020; 5 years ago | 26.95km | 17 | Phase 1 |
| Xiangshan Campus, CAA — West Guihua Road | 30 December 2020; 5 years ago | 23.47km | 11 | Fuyang Section (former Fuyang Line) |
| Zhipu Road | 29 April 2021; 4 years ago | Infill station | 1 | |
| Qianjiang Century City — Goujulong | 6 November 2021; 4 years ago | 8.4 km | 5 | Phase 2 |
| Asian Games Village and Fengbei | 21 February 2023; 3 years ago | Infill station | 2 | |

== Stations ==
| Service Routes | | Station name | | Connections | Date opened | Location | Section |
| Service Routes | | English | Chinese | Connections | Date opened | Location | Section |
|---|---|---|---|---|---|---|---|
| ● | ● | Goujulong | 枸桔弄 | | 6 November 2021 | Shangcheng | Phase 2 |
| ● | ● | East Railway Station (East Square) | 火车东站（东广场） | 19; 1 4 (via East Railway Station); HGH | 6 November 2021 | Shangcheng | Phase 2 |
| ● | ● | Yuanbaotang | 元宝塘 | | 6 November 2021 | Shangcheng | Phase 2 |
| ● | ● | Tanhua'an Road | 昙花庵路 | | 6 November 2021 | Shangcheng | Phase 2 |
| ● | ● | Sanbao | 三堡 | 9 | 6 November 2021 | Shangcheng | Phase 2 |
| ● | ● | Asian Games Village | 亚运村 | | 21 February 2023 | Xiaoshan | Phase 2 |
| ● | ● | Fengbei | 丰北 | 15 | 21 February 2023 | Xiaoshan | Phase 1 |
| ● | ● | Qianjiang Century City | 钱江世纪城 | 2 | 30 December 2020 | Xiaoshan | Phase 1 |
| ● | ● | Expo Center | 博览中心 | | 30 December 2020 | Xiaoshan | Phase 1 |
| ● | ● | Olympic Sports Center | 奥体中心 | 7 | 30 December 2020 | Xiaoshan/ Binjiang | Phase 1 |
| ● | ● | Xingmin | 星民 | | 30 December 2020 | Binjiang | Phase 1 |
| ● | ● | Jiangling Road | 江陵路 | 1 | 30 December 2020 | Binjiang | Phase 1 |
| ● | ● | Jianghan Road | 江汉路 | 18 | 30 December 2020 | Binjiang | Phase 1 |
| ● | ● | Changhe | 长河 | 5 | 30 December 2020 | Binjiang | Phase 1 |
| ● | ● | Jianye Road | 建业路 | | 30 December 2020 | Binjiang | Phase 1 |
| ● | ● | Chengye Road | 诚业路 | | 30 December 2020 | Binjiang | Phase 1 |
| ● | ● | Weiye Road | 伟业路 | | 30 December 2020 | Binjiang | Phase 1 |
| ● | ● | Zhejiang Chinese Medical University | 中医药大学 | 4 | 30 December 2020 | Binjiang | Phase 1 |
| ● | ● | Xipu Road | 西浦路 | | 30 December 2020 | Binjiang | Phase 1 |
| ● | ● | Zhijiang Culture Center (Note: Was Zhipu Road until 1 February 2024) | 之江文化中心 | | 29 April 2021 | Xihu | Phase 1 |
| ● | ● | West Fenghua Road | 枫桦西路 | | 30 December 2020 | Xihu | Phase 1 |
| ● | ● | Xiangshan Campus, China Academy of Art | 美院象山 | 12 | 30 December 2020 | Xihu | Phase 1 |
| ● | | | Zhejiang Conservatory of Music | 音乐学院 | | 30 December 2020 | Xihu | Fuyang Section |
| ● | | | Zhongcun | 中村 | | 30 December 2020 | Xihu | Fuyang Section |
| ● | | | East Safari Park | 野生动物园东 | | 30 December 2020 | Fuyang | Fuyang Section |
| ● | | | Yinhu | 银湖 | | 30 December 2020 | Fuyang | Fuyang Section |
| ● | | | Huxiaoxing | 虎啸杏 | | 30 December 2020 | Fuyang | Fuyang Section |
| ● | | | Shouxiang | 受降 | | 30 December 2020 | Fuyang | Fuyang Section |
| ● | | | Fuyang Coach Center | 富阳客运中心 | | 30 December 2020 | Fuyang | Fuyang Section |
| ● | | | Gaoqiao | 高桥 | | 30 December 2020 | Fuyang | Fuyang Section |
| ● | | | Yangbeihu | 阳陂湖 | | 30 December 2020 | Fuyang | Fuyang Section |
| ● | | | Gongwang Street | 公望街 | | 30 December 2020 | Fuyang | Fuyang Section |
| ● | | | West Guihua Road | 桂花西路 | | 30 December 2020 | Fuyang | Fuyang Section |
| | ● | Xiaming Street | 霞鸣街 | | 30 December 2020 | Xihu | Phase 1 |
| | ● | Kehai Road | 科海路 | | 30 December 2020 | Xihu | Phase 1 |
| | ● | Shuangpu | 双浦 | | 30 December 2020 | Xihu | Phase 1 |

== Rolling stock ==
| Stock | Class | Year built | Builder | Number built | Numbers | Formation | Depots | Line assigned | Notes |
|---|---|---|---|---|---|---|---|---|---|
| PM119 | B | 2017-2019 | CRRC Nanjing Puzhen | 252 (42 sets) | 06 001 - 06 042 (060011-060426) | Tc+Mp+M+M+Mp+Tc | Shuangpu Depot; Fengbei Yard; Songjiatang Depot | 6 | |
| PM146 | B | 2020-2021 | CRRC Nanjing Puzhen | 72 (12 sets) | 06 043 - 06 054 (060431-060546) | Tc+Mp+M+M+Mp+Tc | Shuangpu Depot; Fengbei Yard; Songjiatang Depot | 6 | |

== See also ==
- Hangzhou Metro
