= Gongwang Street station =

Metro station in Hangzhou, China

Gongwang Street 公望街
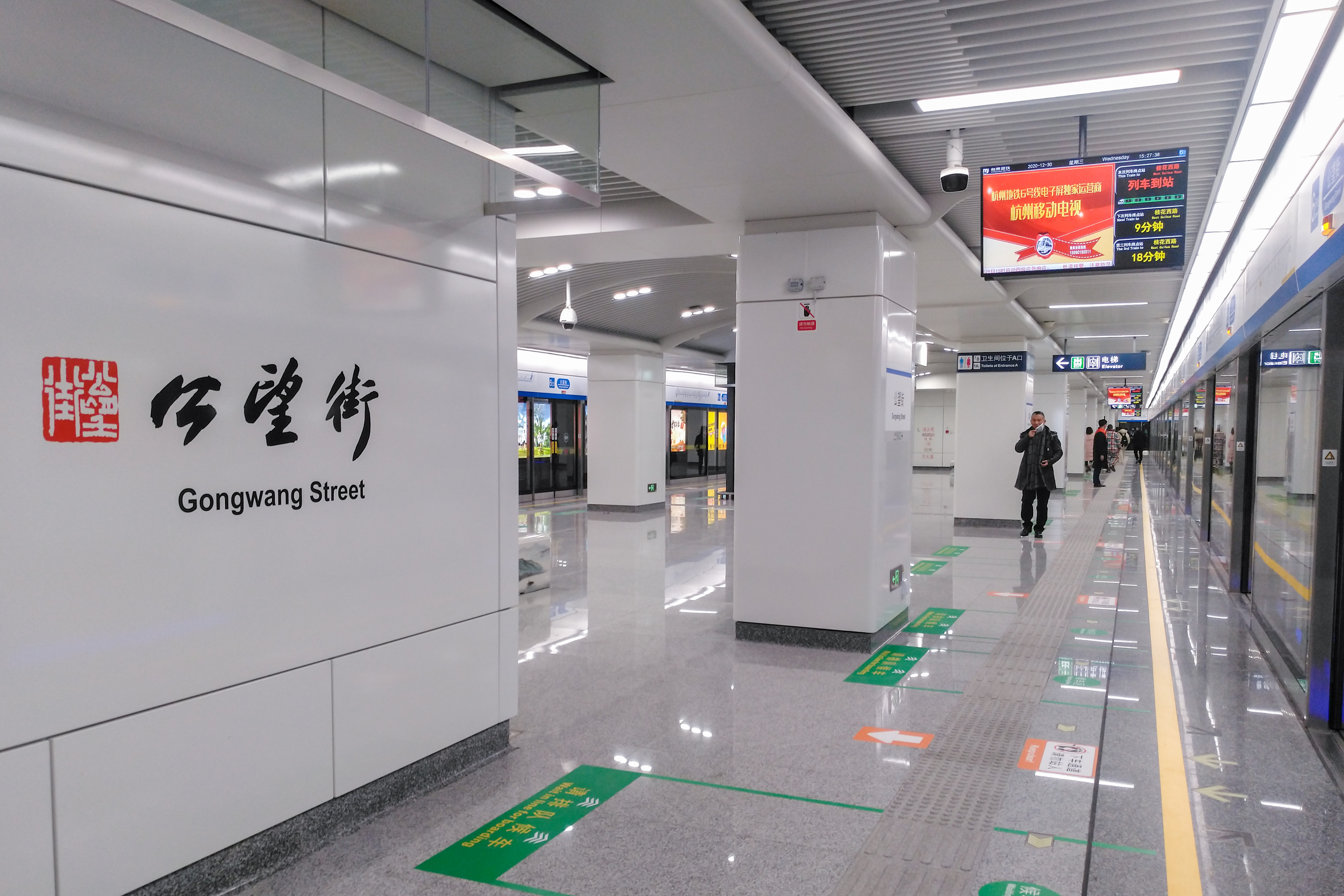

General information
- Location: Fuyang District, Hangzhou, Zhejiang; China
- Operator: Hangzhou Metro Corporation
- Line: Line 6

Other information
- Station code: GWJ

History
- Opened: 30 December 2020

Services
| Preceding station | Hangzhou Metro | Following station |
|---|---|---|
| West Guihua Road Terminus | Line 6 | Yangbeihu towards Goujulong |
Location

Gongwang Street (Chinese: 公望街) is a metro station on Line 6 of the Hangzhou Metro in China. It was opened on 30 December 2020, together with the Line 6. It is located in the Fuyang District of Hangzhou, the capital city of Zhejiang province.
