= Yinhu station (Hangzhou Metro) =

Metro station in Hangzhou, China

Yinhu 银湖
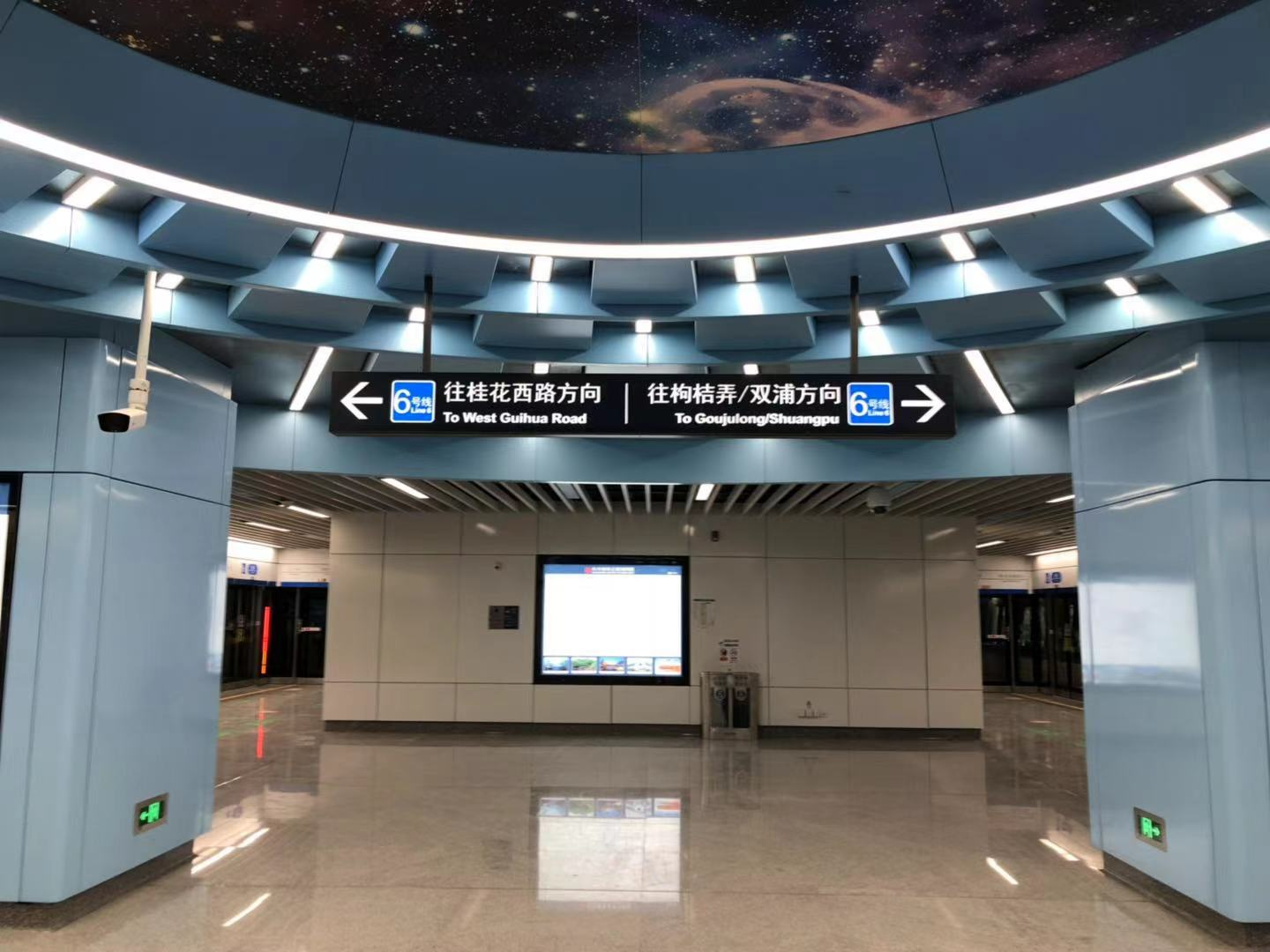
- Platform of Yinhu station

General information
- Location: Fuyang District, Hangzhou, Zhejiang; China
- Coordinates: 30.142°N 119.984°E
- Operator: Hangzhou Metro Corporation
- Line: Line 6

Other information
- Station code: YIH

History
- Opened: 30 December 2020

Services
Preceding station	Hangzhou Metro	Following station
Huxiaoxing towards West Guihua Road	Line 6	East Safari Park towards Goujulong
Location

Yinhu (Chinese: 银湖) is a metro station on Line 6 of the Hangzhou Metro in China. It was opened on 30 December 2020, together with the Line 6. It is located in the Fuyang District of Hangzhou, Zhejiang province.
