= West Guihua Road station =

Metro station in Hangzhou, China

West Guihua Road 桂花西路
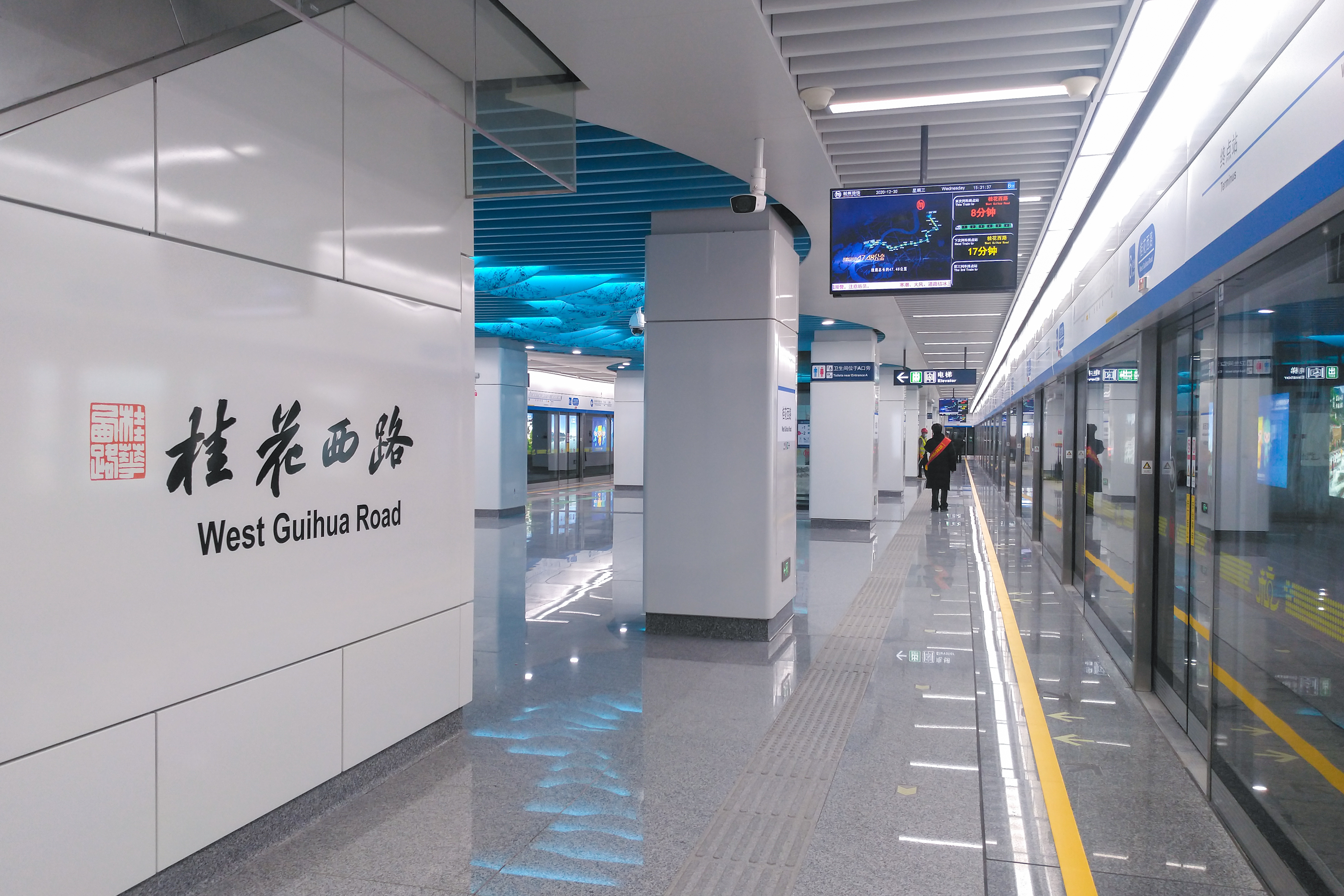

General information
- Location: Jinqiao Road (N) & Jinqiao Road (S) × Guihua Road (W) & Hengliangting Road; Fuyang District, Hangzhou, Zhejiang; China
- Coordinates: 30°03′02″N 119°55′47″E
- System: Hangzhou metro station
- Operator: Hangzhou Metro Corporation
- Line: Line 6
- Platforms: 2 (1 island platform)

Construction
- Structure type: Underground
- Accessible: Yes

Other information
- Station code: GHX

History
- Opened: 30 December 2020

Services
Preceding station	Hangzhou Metro	Following station
Terminus	Line 6	Gongwang Street towards Goujulong
Location

West Guihua Road (Chinese: 桂花西路) is the western terminus of the Fuyang section of Line 6 of the Hangzhou Metro in China. It was opened on 30 December 2020, together with the Line 6. It is located in downtown Fuyang District of Hangzhou, the capital city of Zhejiang province.

== Station layout ==
West Guihua Road stationhas two levels: a concourse, and an island platform with two tracks for line 6.

== Entrances/exits ==
- A: west side of Jinqiao Road (N), Sunquan Road
- B: EST Mall Shopping Center
- C: Xingguangyuan community
- E: Taipingqiao community

== Gallery ==
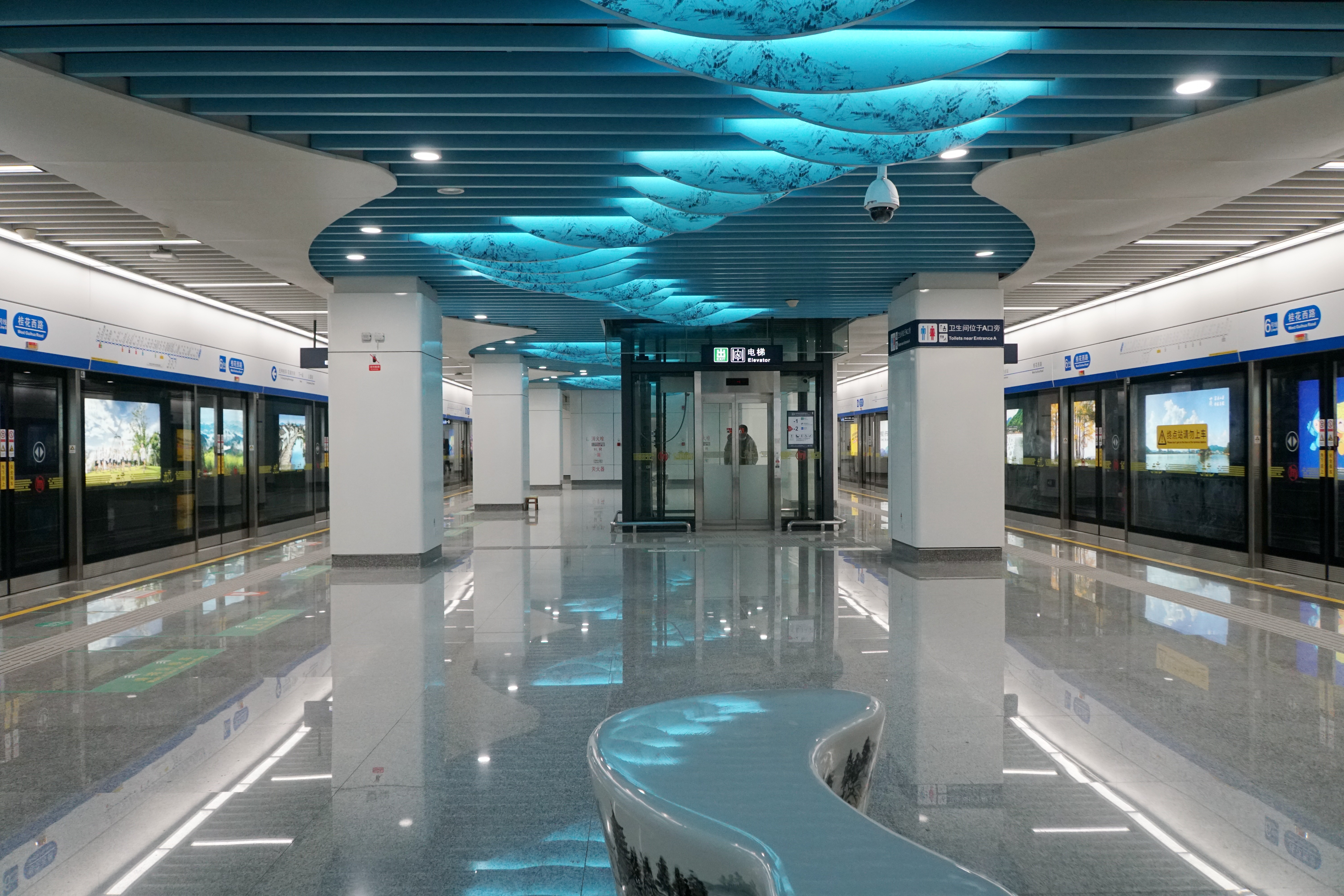
Platform

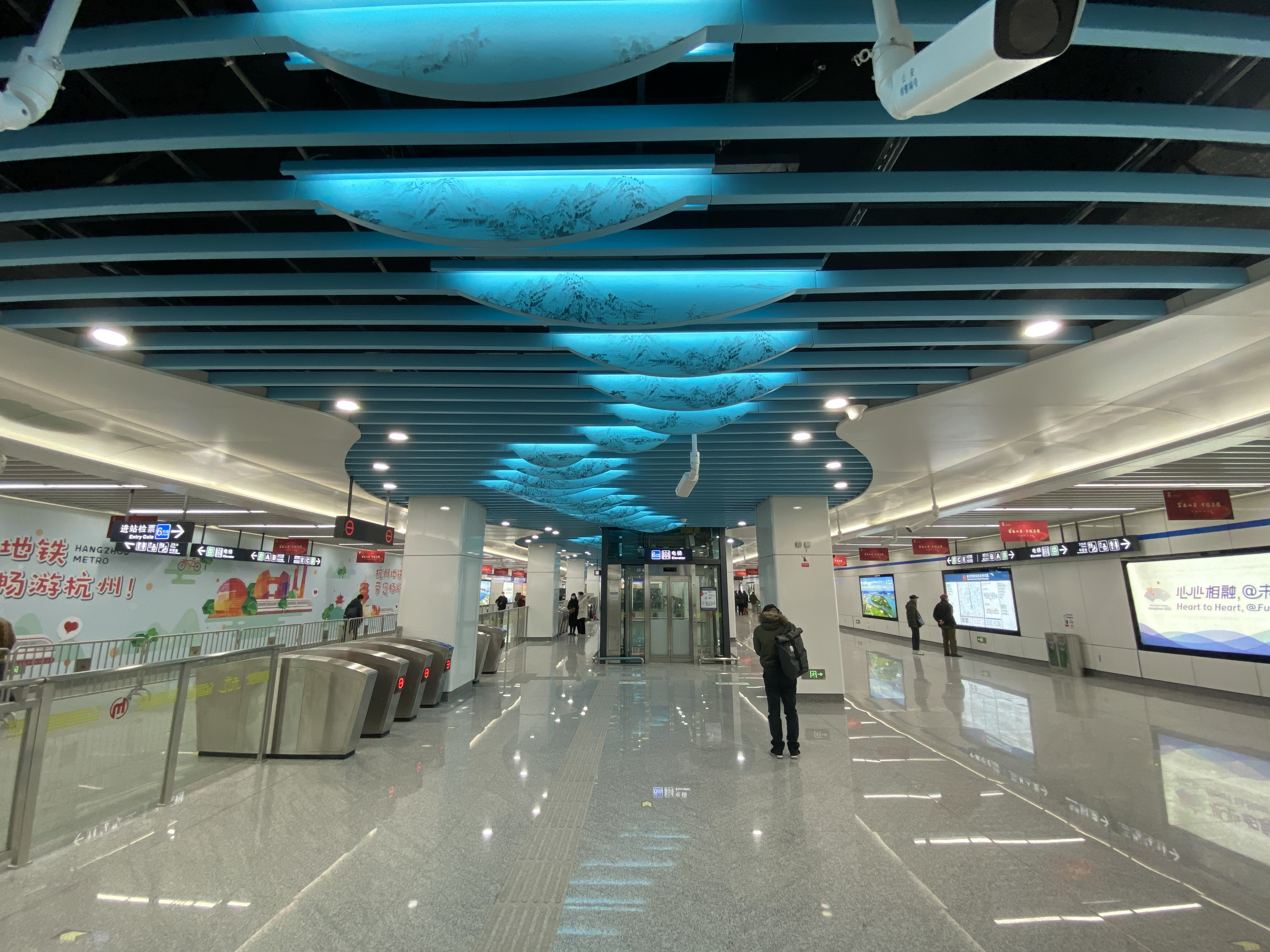
Concourse

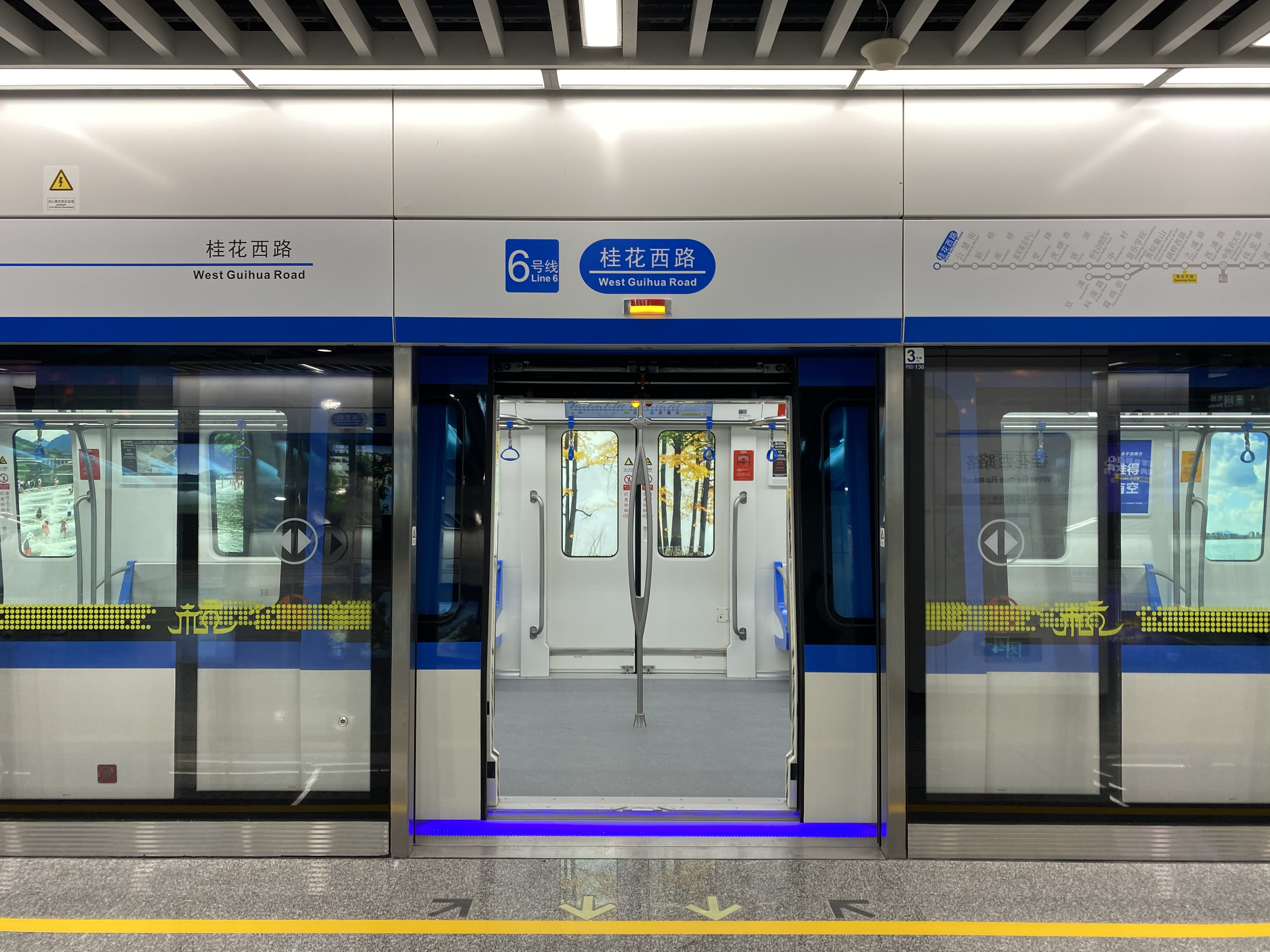
Train of Line 6 at West Guihua Road

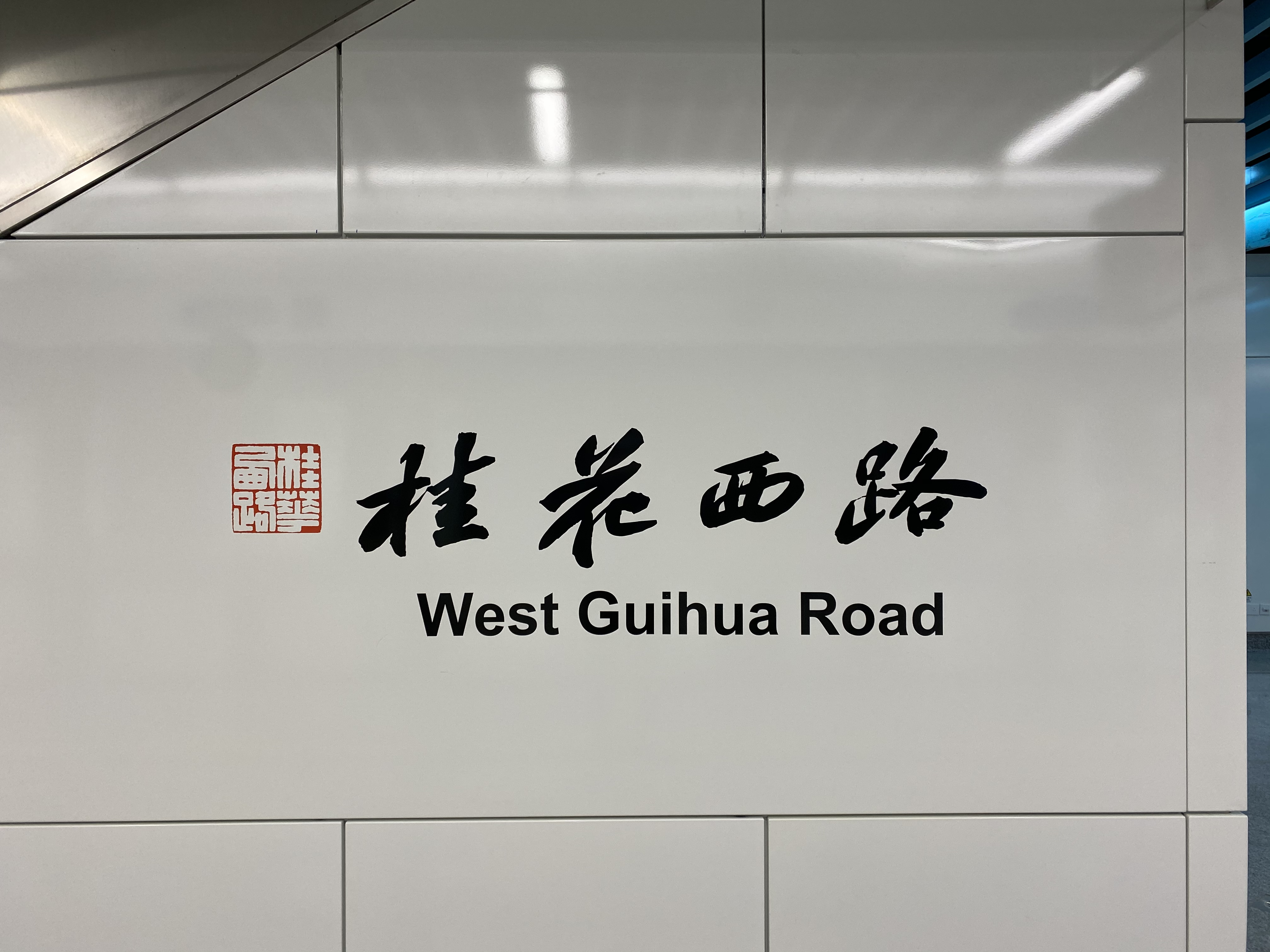
Station name in traditional Chinese calligraphy

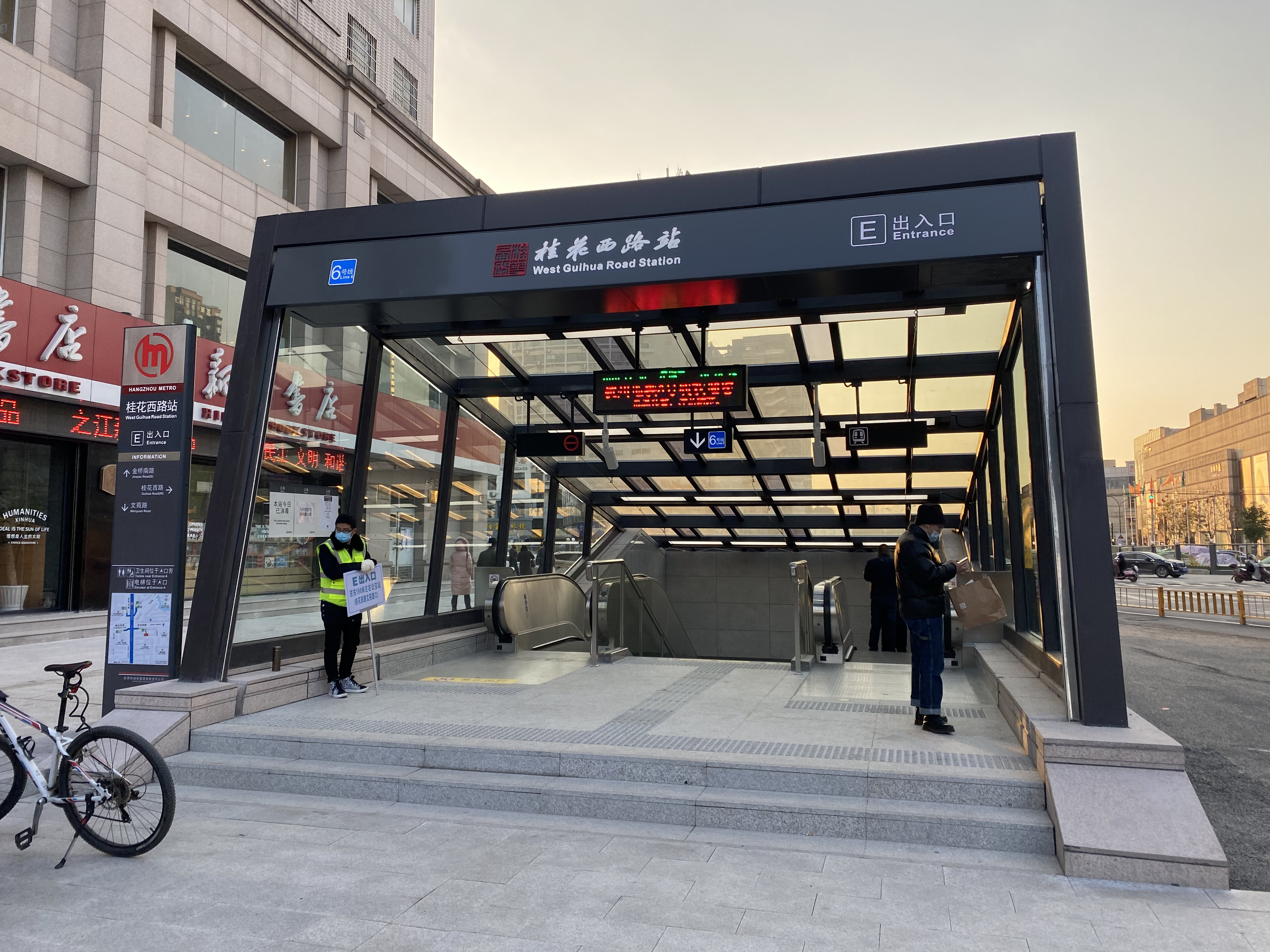
Exit E
