= Goujulong station =

Metro station in China

Goujulong 枸桔弄
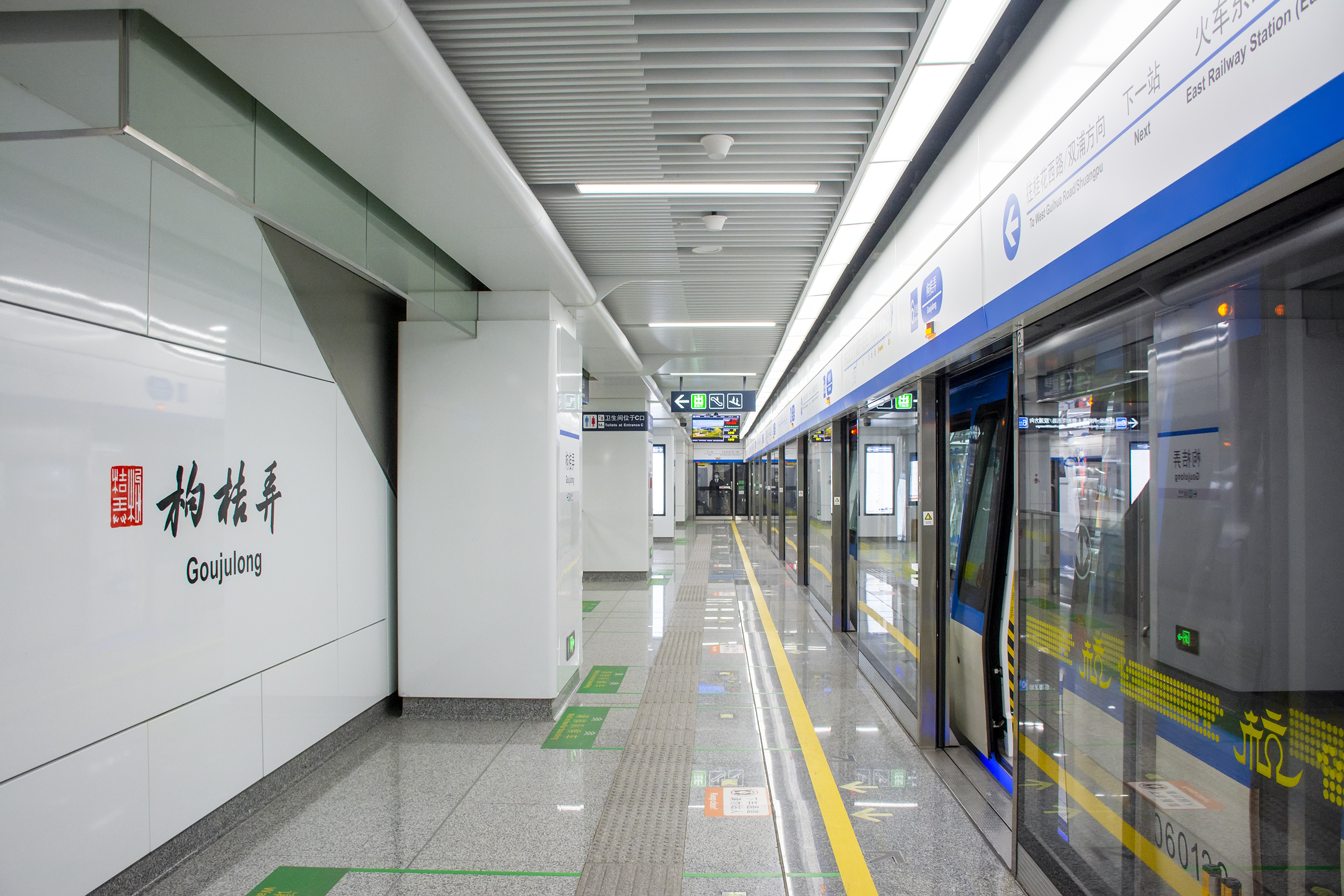
- Platform

General information
- Location: Dongning Road × Jichang Road; Shangcheng District, Hangzhou, Zhejiang; China
- Coordinates: 30.30366°N 120.20199°E
- System: Hangzhou metro station
- Operator: Hangzhou Metro Corporation
- Line: Line 6
- Platforms: 2 (1 island platform) (1 in use)

Construction
- Structure type: Underground
- Accessible: Yes

Services
Preceding station	Hangzhou Metro	Following station
East Railway Station (East Square) towards West Guihua Road or Shuangpu	Line 6	Terminus
Location

Goujulong (simplified Chinese: 枸桔弄; traditional Chinese: 枸橘弄) is a metro station on Line 6 of the Hangzhou Metro in Zhejiang, China.

It is located at the intersection of Dongning Road and Jichang Road, in Shangcheng District and is the terminus of Line 6. It opened on November 6, 2021.

== Station layout ==
Goujulong has two levels: a concourse, and an island platform with two tracks for line 6.

== Entrances/exits ==
- A: Guangyu Dongrun Building
- B: Donggang Space
- C: east side of Donggning Road, south side of Jichang Road
- D: Donggang Jiayuan Community (Zone 1)
