= Hehuan Road station =

Metro station in Hangzhou, China

Hehuan Road 合欢路
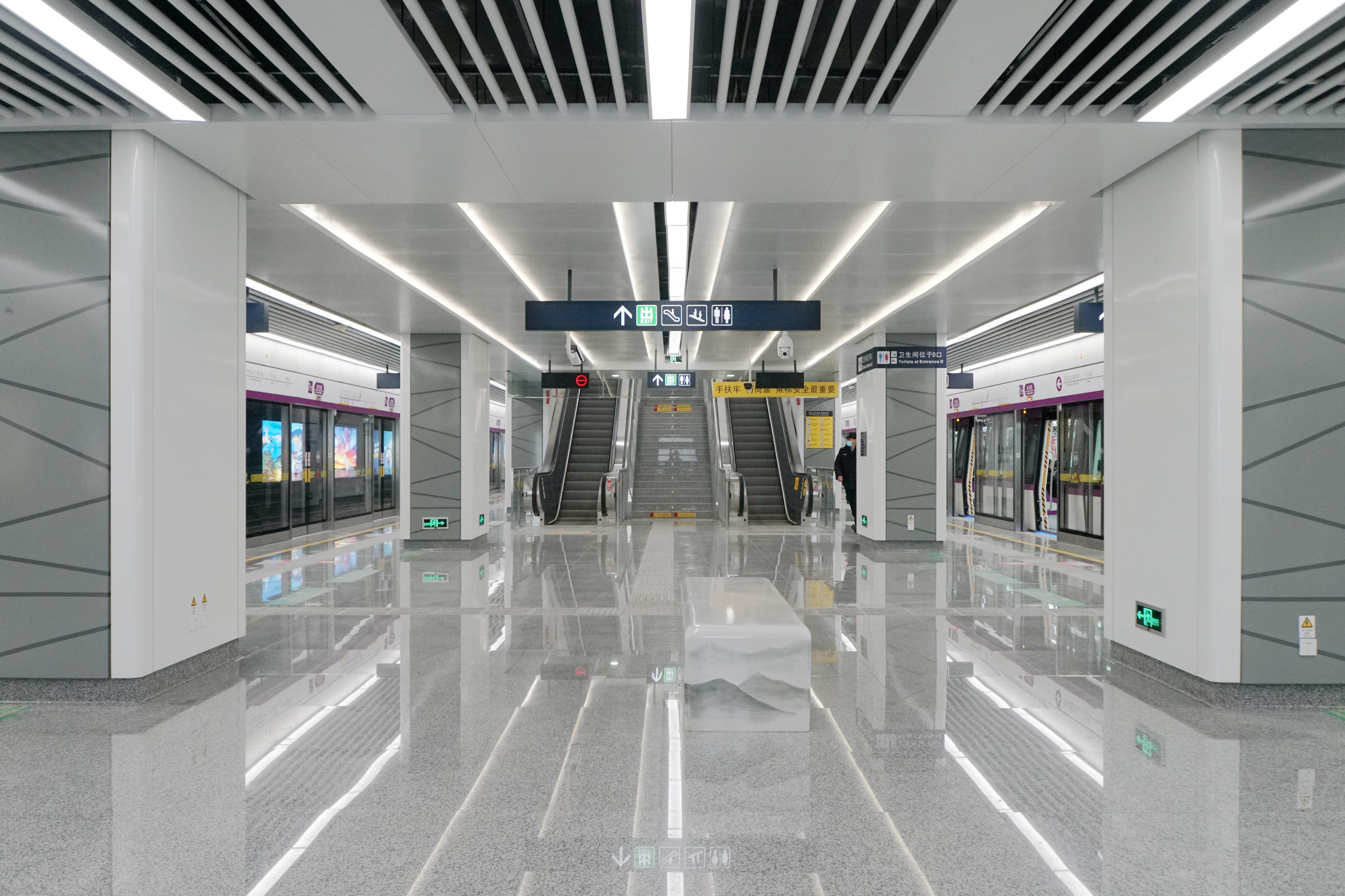

General information
- Location: Xiaoshan District, Hangzhou, Zhejiang; China
- Operator: Hangzhou Metro Corporation
- Line: Line 7

Other information
- Station code: HHL

History
- Opened: 30 December 2020

Services
Preceding station	Hangzhou Metro	Following station
Xinjie towards Wushan Square	Line 7	Yingzhong towards Jiangdong'er Road
Location

Hehuan Road (Chinese: 合欢路) is a metro station on Line 7 of the Hangzhou Metro in China. It was opened on 30 December 2020, together with the Line 7. It is located in the Xiaoshan District of Hangzhou.
