= Xinxing Road station =

Metro station in Hangzhou, China

Xinxing Road 新兴路
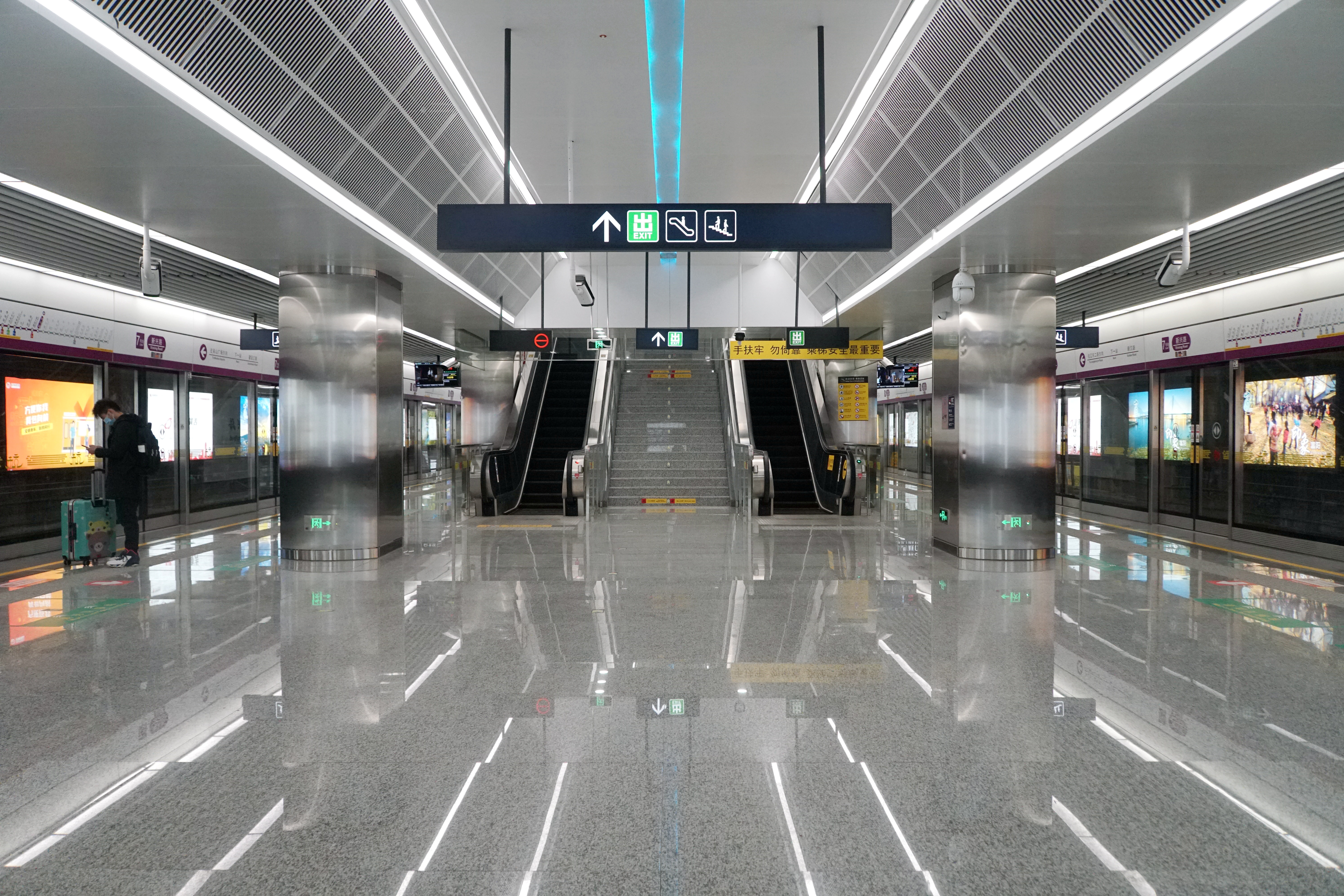

General information
- Location: Xiaoshan District, Hangzhou, Zhejiang; China
- Coordinates: 30.20745°N 120.28936°E
- Operator: Hangzhou Metro Corporation
- Line: Line 7

Other information
- Station code: XXL

History
- Opened: 30 December 2020

Services
Preceding station	Hangzhou Metro	Following station
Jianshesan Road towards Wushan Square	Line 7	Xinhan Road towards Jiangdong'er Road
Location

Xinxing Road (Chinese: 新兴路) is a metro station on Line 7 of the Hangzhou Metro in China. It was opened on 30 December 2020, together with the Line 7. It is located in the Xiaoshan District of Hangzhou.
