= Kanshan station =

Metro station in Hangzhou, China

Kanshan 坎山
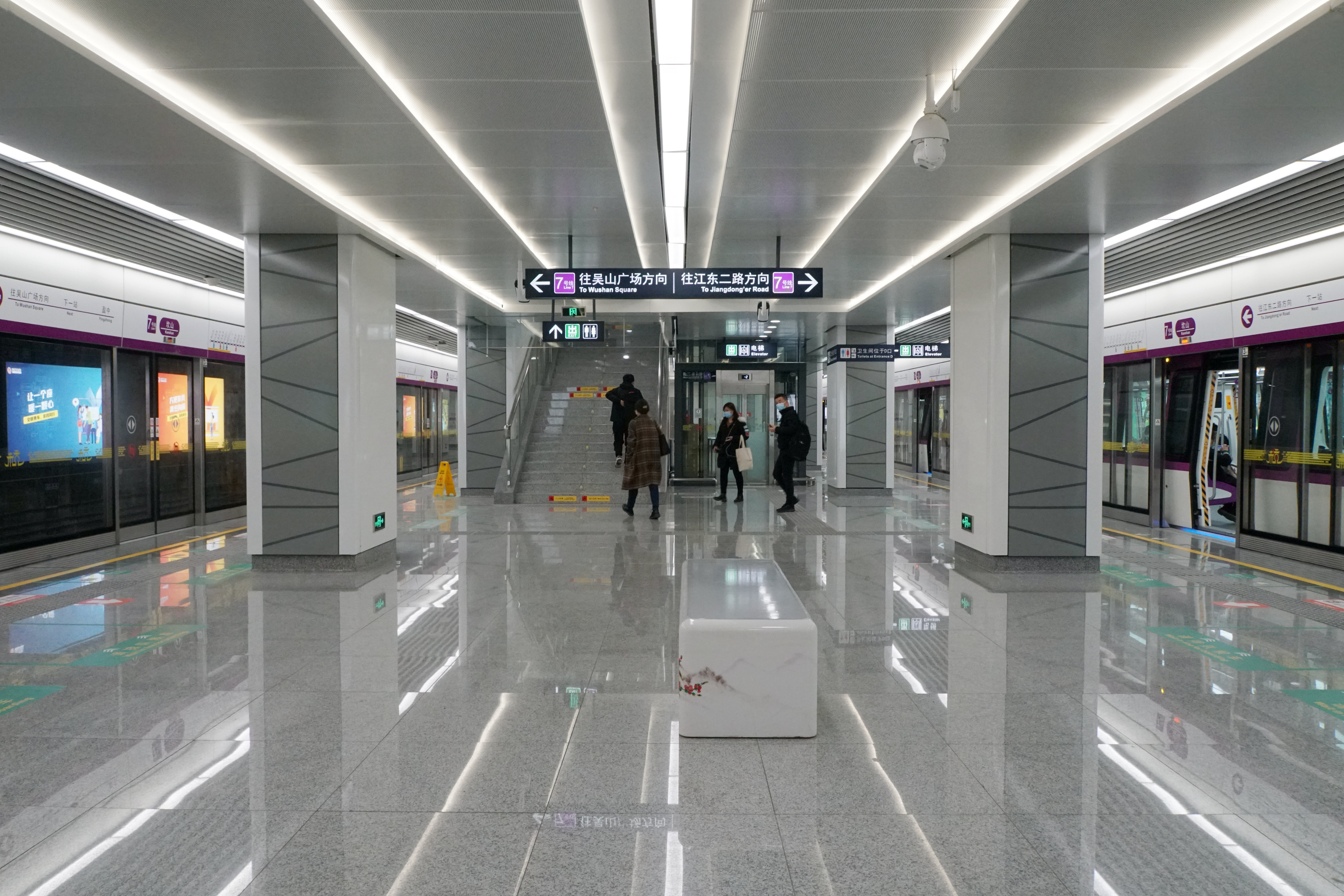
- Platforms

General information
- Location: Jianshe 4 Road × Kanhong Road; Xiaoshan District, Hangzhou, Zhejiang; China
- Coordinates: 30°12′00″N 120°23′23″E
- System: Hangzhou metro station
- Operator: Hangzhou Metro Corporation
- Line: Line 7
- Platforms: 2 (1 island platform)

Construction
- Structure type: Underground
- Accessible: Yes

Other information
- Station code: KAS

History
- Opened: 30 December 2020

Services
Preceding station	Hangzhou Metro	Following station
Yingzhong towards Wushan Square	Line 7	Xingang towards Jiangdong'er Road
Location

Kanshan (Chinese: 坎山) is a metro station on Line 7 of the Hangzhou Metro in China. It was opened on 30 December 2020, together with the Line 7. It is located in the Xiaoshan District of Hangzhou.

== Station layout ==
Kanshan has two levels: a concourse, and an island platform with two tracks for line 7.

== Entrances/exits ==
- A: east side of Kanhong Road, Guoqing Road
- B: north side of Jianshe 4 Road, Minhang Road
- C: south side of Jianshe 4 Road, Minhang Road
- D: east side of Kanhong Road, Beitang Road (E)
