= Xinhan Road station =

Metro station in Hangzhou, China

Xinhan Road 新汉路
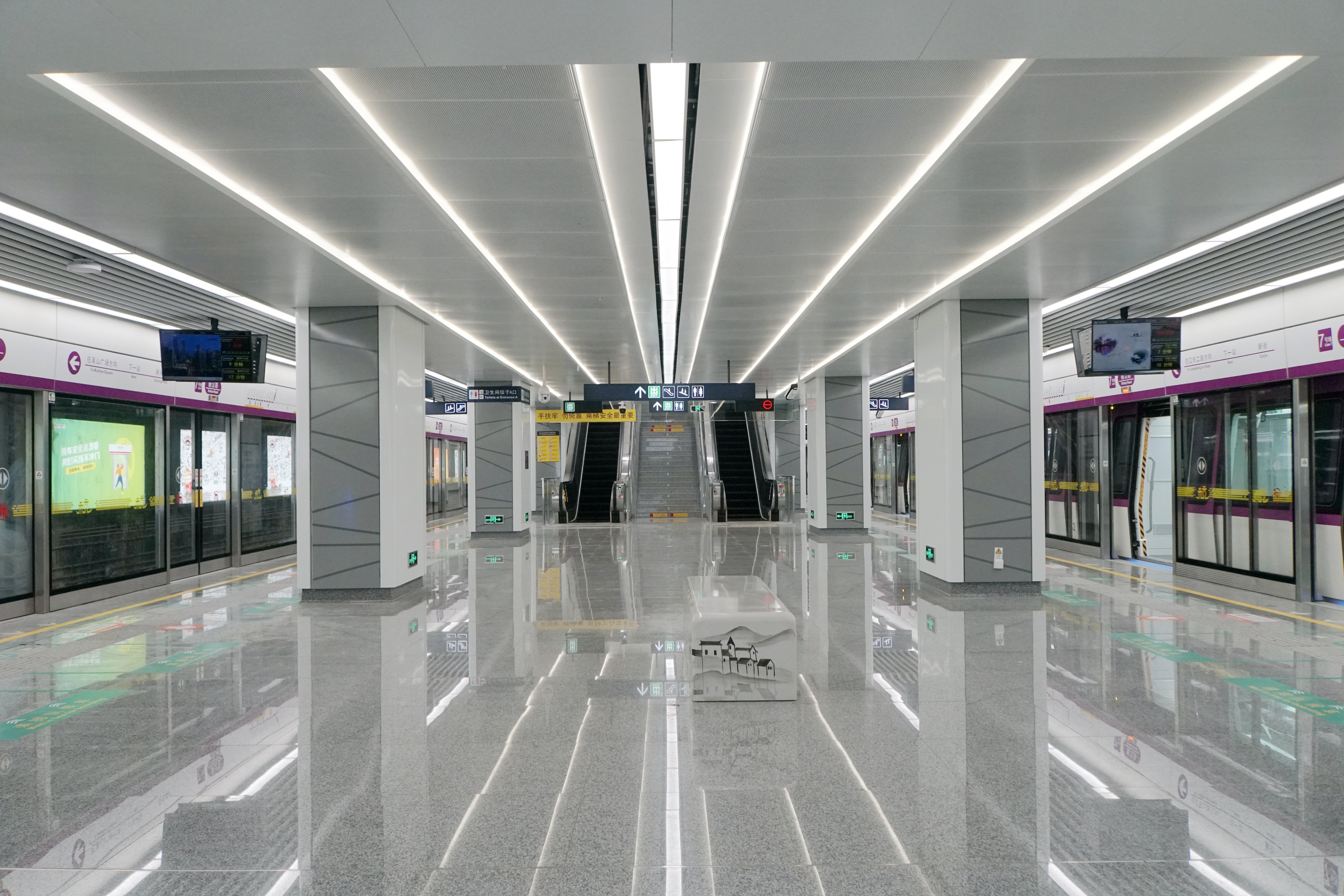

General information
- Location: Xiaoshan District, Hangzhou, Zhejiang; China
- Coordinates: 30.20542°N 120.3023°E
- Operator: Hangzhou Metro Corporation
- Line: Line 7

Other information
- Station code: XHL

History
- Opened: 30 December 2020

Services
Preceding station	Hangzhou Metro	Following station
Xinxing Road towards Wushan Square	Line 7	Xinjie towards Jiangdong'er Road
Location

Xinhan Road (Chinese: 新汉路) is a metro station on Line 7 of the Hangzhou Metro in China. It was opened on 30 December 2020, together with the Line 7. It is located in the Xiaoshan District of Hangzhou.
