= Jianshesan Road station =

Hangzhou Metro station

Coordinates: 30°12′24″N 120°15′50″E

Jianshesan Road 建设三路
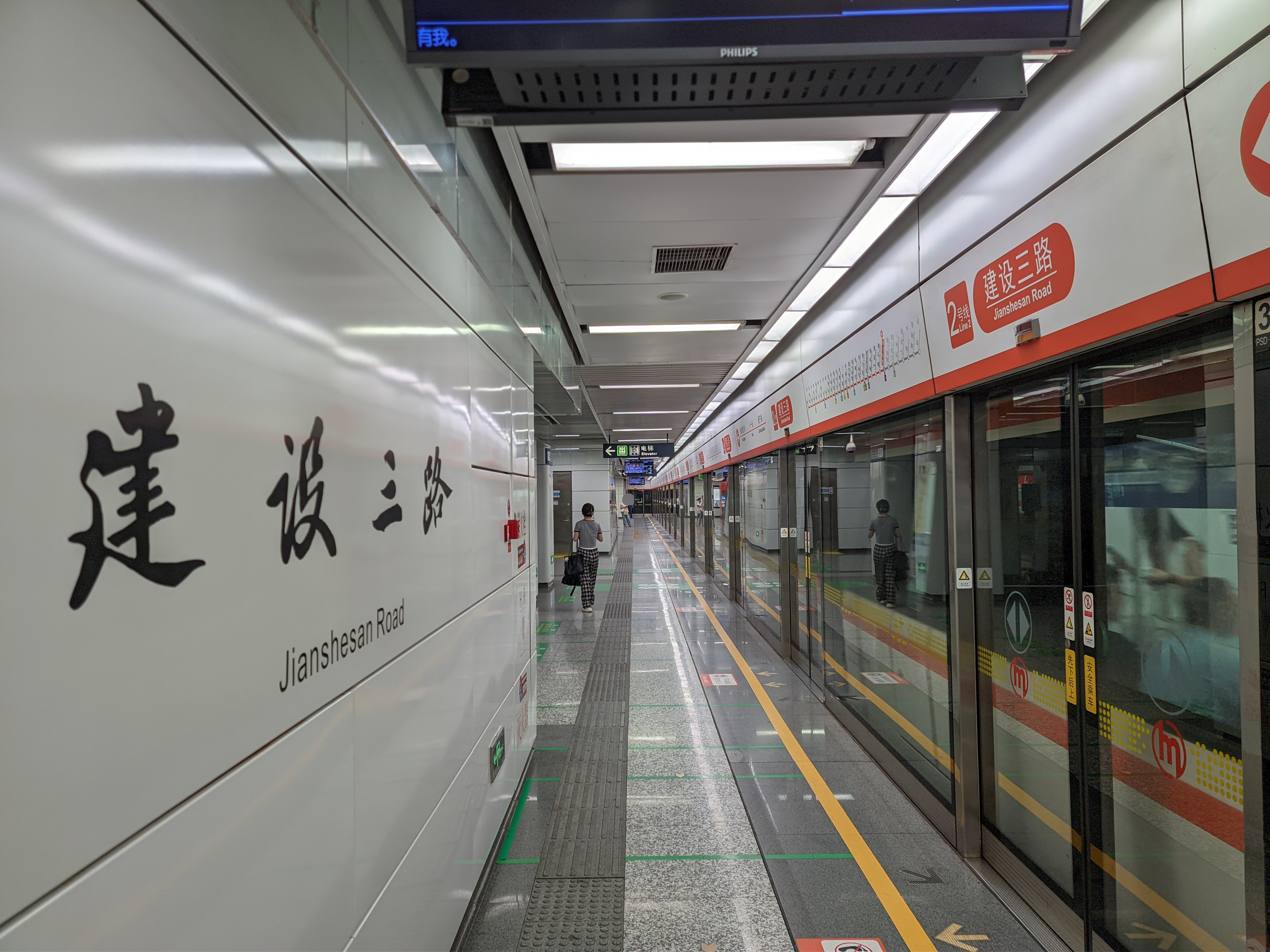
- Line 2 platforms

General information
- Location: Xiaoshan District, Hangzhou, Zhejiang; China
- Operator: Hangzhou Metro Corporation
- Lines: Line 2 Line 7
- Platforms: 4 (2 island platforms)

History
- Opened: November 24, 2014 (Line 2); December 30, 2020 (Line 7)

Services
Preceding station	Hangzhou Metro	Following station
Jiansheyi Road towards Chaoyang	Line 2	Zhenning Road towards Liangzhu
Mingxing Road towards Wushan Square	Line 7	Xinxing Road towards Jiangdong'er Road
Location

Jianshesan Road (Chinese: 建设三路) is a metro station on Line 2 and Line 7 of the Hangzhou Metro in China. It is located in the Xiaoshan District of Hangzhou. This station has four exits.
