= Xingang station =

Metro station in Hangzhou, China

Xingang 新港
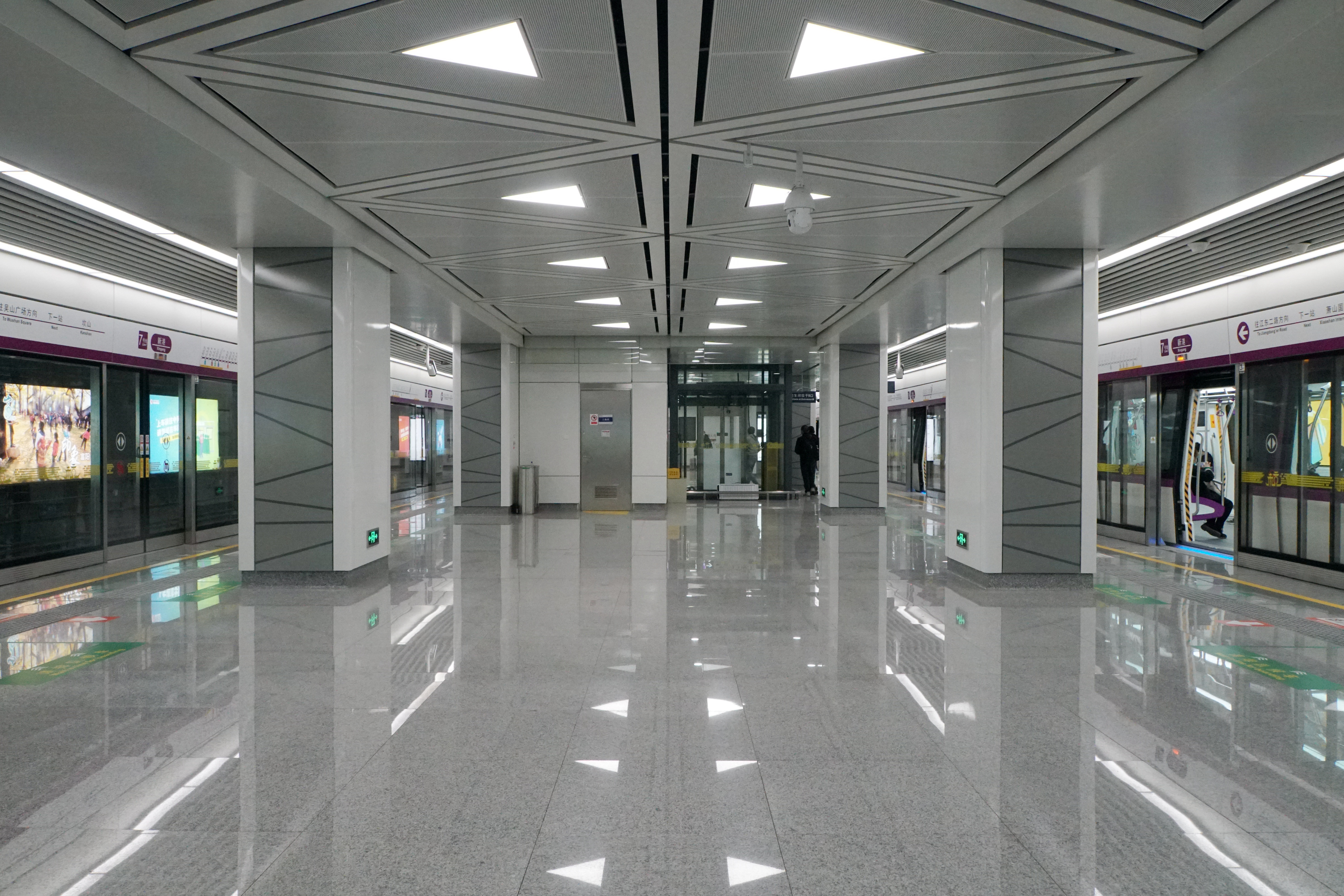

General information
- Location: Xiaoshan District, Hangzhou, Zhejiang; China
- Coordinates: 30.220483°N 120.403974°E
- Operator: Hangzhou Metro Corporation
- Line: Line 7

Other information
- Station code: XIG

History
- Opened: 30 December 2020

Services
| Preceding station | Hangzhou Metro | Following station |
|---|---|---|
| Kanshan towards Wushan Square | Line 7 | Xiaoshan International Airport towards Jiangdong'er Road |
Location

Xingang (Chinese: 新港) is a metro station on Line 7 of the Hangzhou Metro in China. It was opened on 30 December 2020, together with the Line 7. It is located in the Xiaoshan District of Hangzhou.
