= Citizen Center station =

Metro station in Hangzhou, China

Coordinates: 30°14′49″N 120°12′24″E

Citizen Center 市民中心
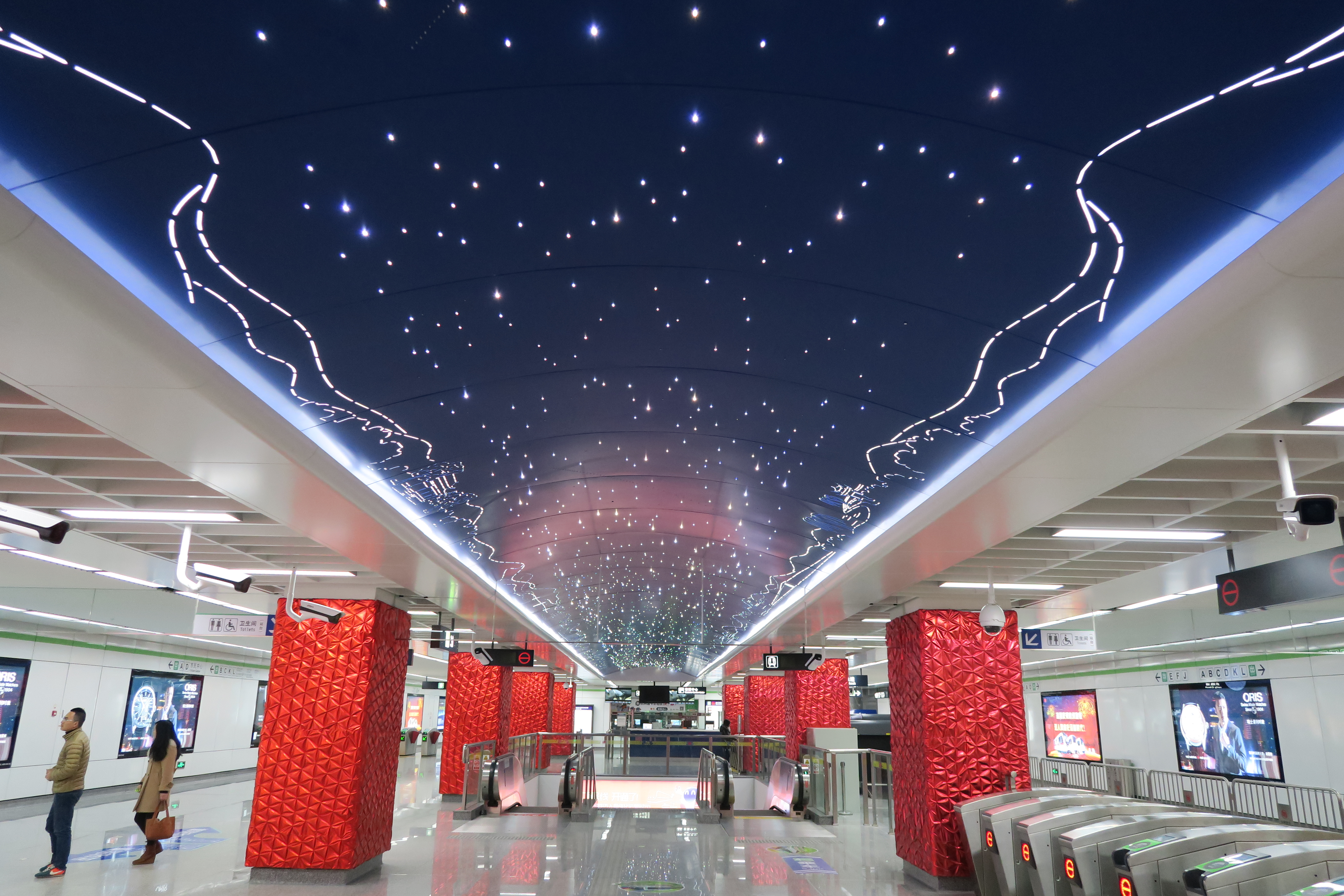
- Line 4 concourse

General information
- Location: Shangcheng District, Hangzhou, Zhejiang; China
- Operated by: Hangzhou Metro Corporation
- Line(s): Line 4 Line 7

History
- Opened: February 2, 2015 (Line 4); September 17, 2021 (Line 7)

Services
Preceding station	Hangzhou Metro	Following station
Chengxing Road towards Puyan	Line 4	Jiangjin Road towards Chihua Street
Guanyintang towards Wushan Square	Line 7	Olympic Sports Center towards Jiangdong'er Road

Citizen Center (Chinese: 市民中心) is a metro station on Line 4 and Line 7 of the Hangzhou Metro in China. It is located beside the Hangzhou Civic Center in Hangzhou's Shangcheng District.

The station opened on 2 February 2015, together with the rest ones of phase I initial section on Line 4.

It has become a transfer station between Line 4 and Line 7 after 17 September 2021 when Line 7 opened with this station as terminus.

On 1 April 2022, when phase I remaining section of Line 7 was opened, its new terminus became Wushan Square so this station became a passerby.
