= Xingang =

Xingang may refer to:

- Xingang, Chiayi (Chinese: 新港鄉)
- Xingang station (Chinese: 新港站), a metro station serving Line 7 of the Hangzhou Metro
- Xingangdong station (Chinese: 新港东站), a metro station serving Line 8 of the Guangzhou Metro
- Xingang Line (Chinese: 新港线), a future rapid transit line for Wuhan Metro
- Port of Tianjin, also known as Tianjin Xingang (Chinese: 天津新港)
- Sinkang Manuscripts (Chinese: 新港文書)
