= Moyetang station =

Metro station in Hangzhou, China

Moyetang 莫邪塘
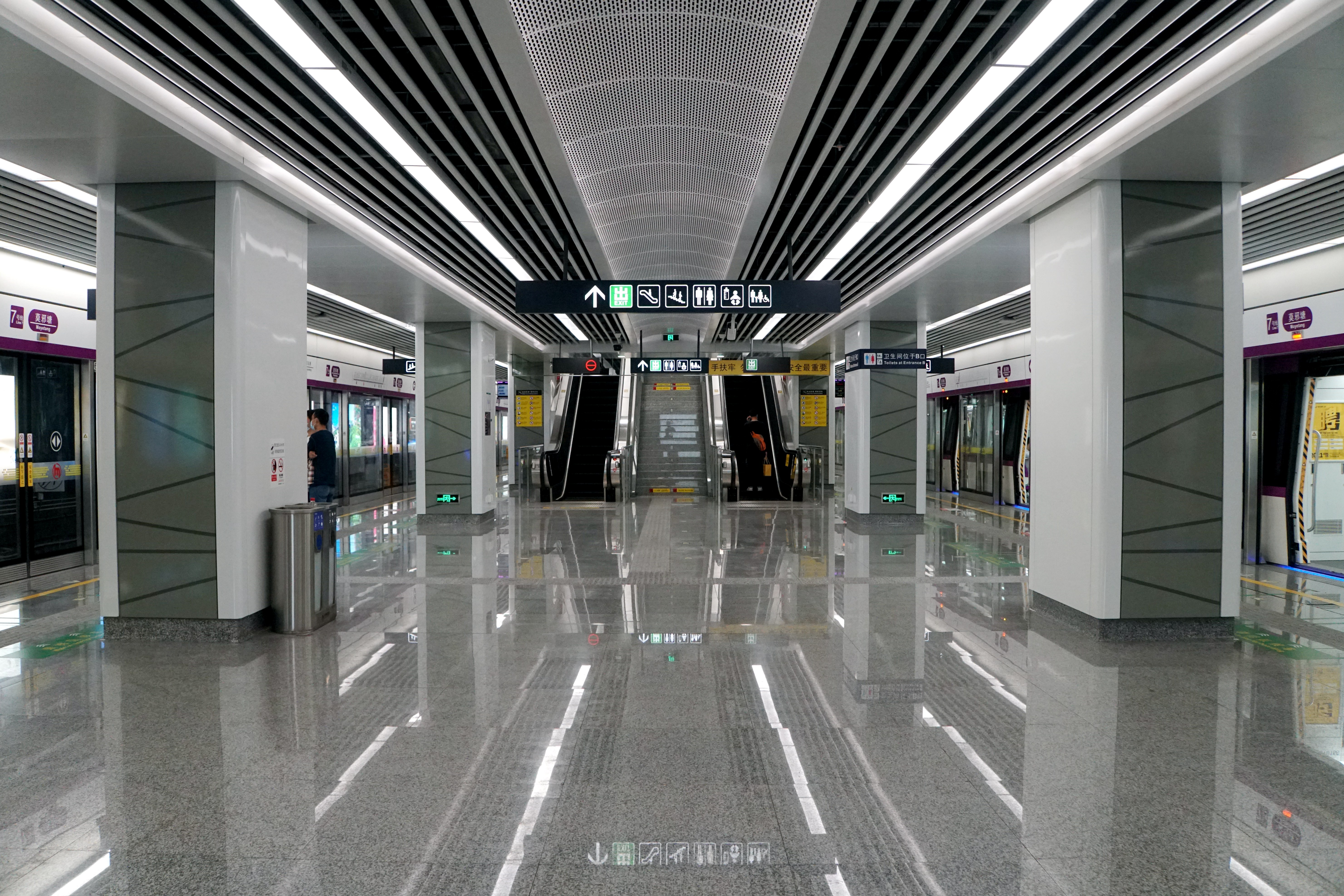
- Platform

General information
- Location: Shangcheng District, Hangzhou, Zhejiang; China
- Operated by: Hangzhou Metro Corporation
- Line: Line 7
- Platforms: 2 (1 island platform)

History
- Opened: 22 April 2022

Services
Preceding station	Hangzhou Metro	Following station
Jiangcheng Road towards Wushan Square	Line 7	Guanyintang towards Jiangdong'er Road
Location

Moyetang (Chinese: 莫邪塘) is a metro station on Line 7 of the Hangzhou Metro in China. It was opened on 22 April 2022. It is located in the Shangcheng District of Hangzhou.
