= Yingzhong station =

Metro station in Hangzhou, China

Yingzhong 盈中
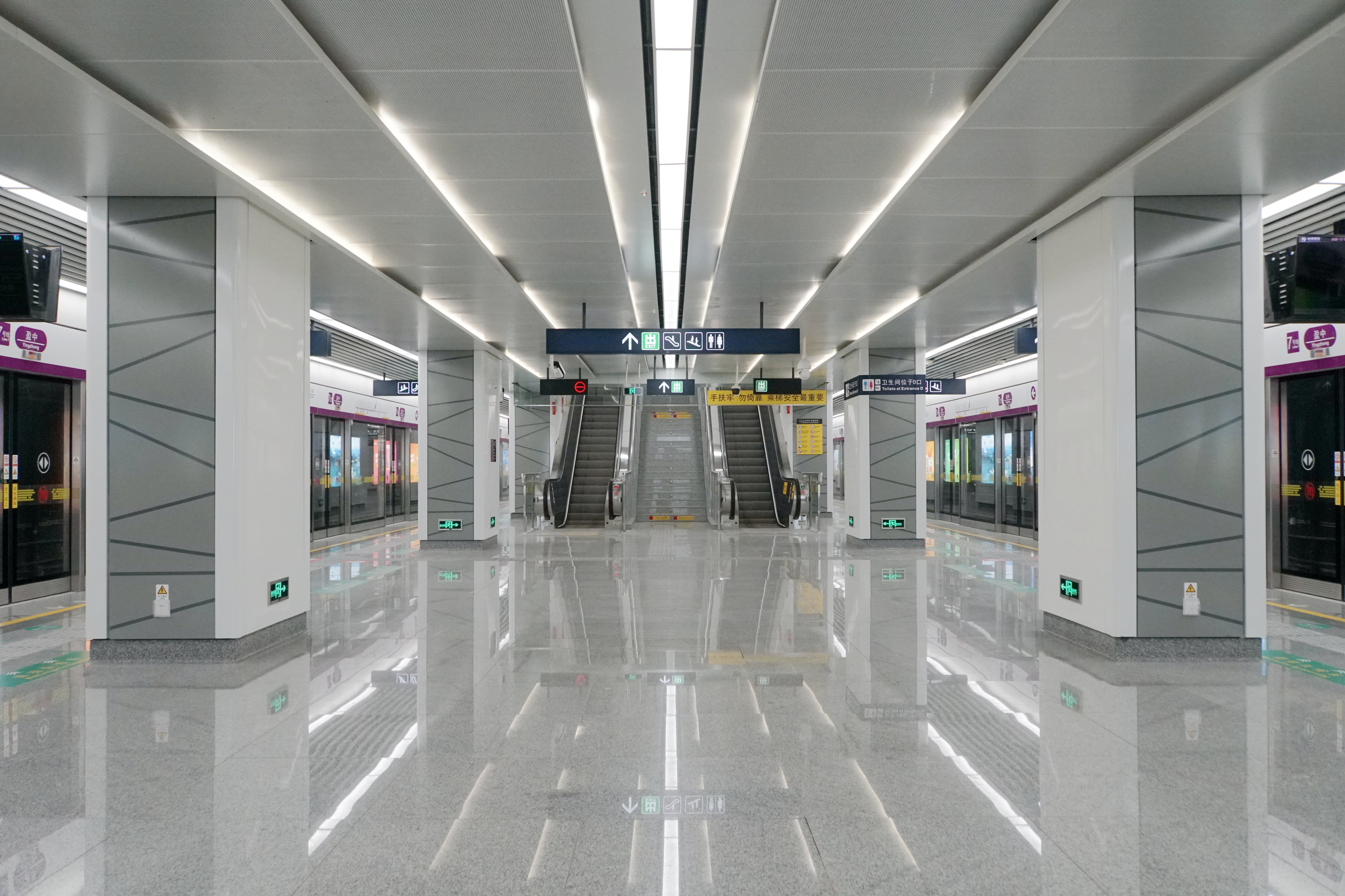

General information
- Location: Xiaoshan District, Hangzhou, Zhejiang; China
- Operator: Hangzhou Metro Corporation
- Line: Line 7

Other information
- Station code: YIZ

History
- Opened: 30 December 2020

Services
Preceding station	Hangzhou Metro	Following station
Hehuan Road towards Wushan Square	Line 7	Kanshan towards Jiangdong'er Road
Location

Yingzhong (Chinese: 盈中) is a metro station on Line 7 of the Hangzhou Metro in China. It was opened on 30 December 2020, together with the Line 7. It is located in the Xiaoshan District of Hangzhou.
