= Jiangcheng Road station =

Metro station in China

Jiangcheng Road 江城路
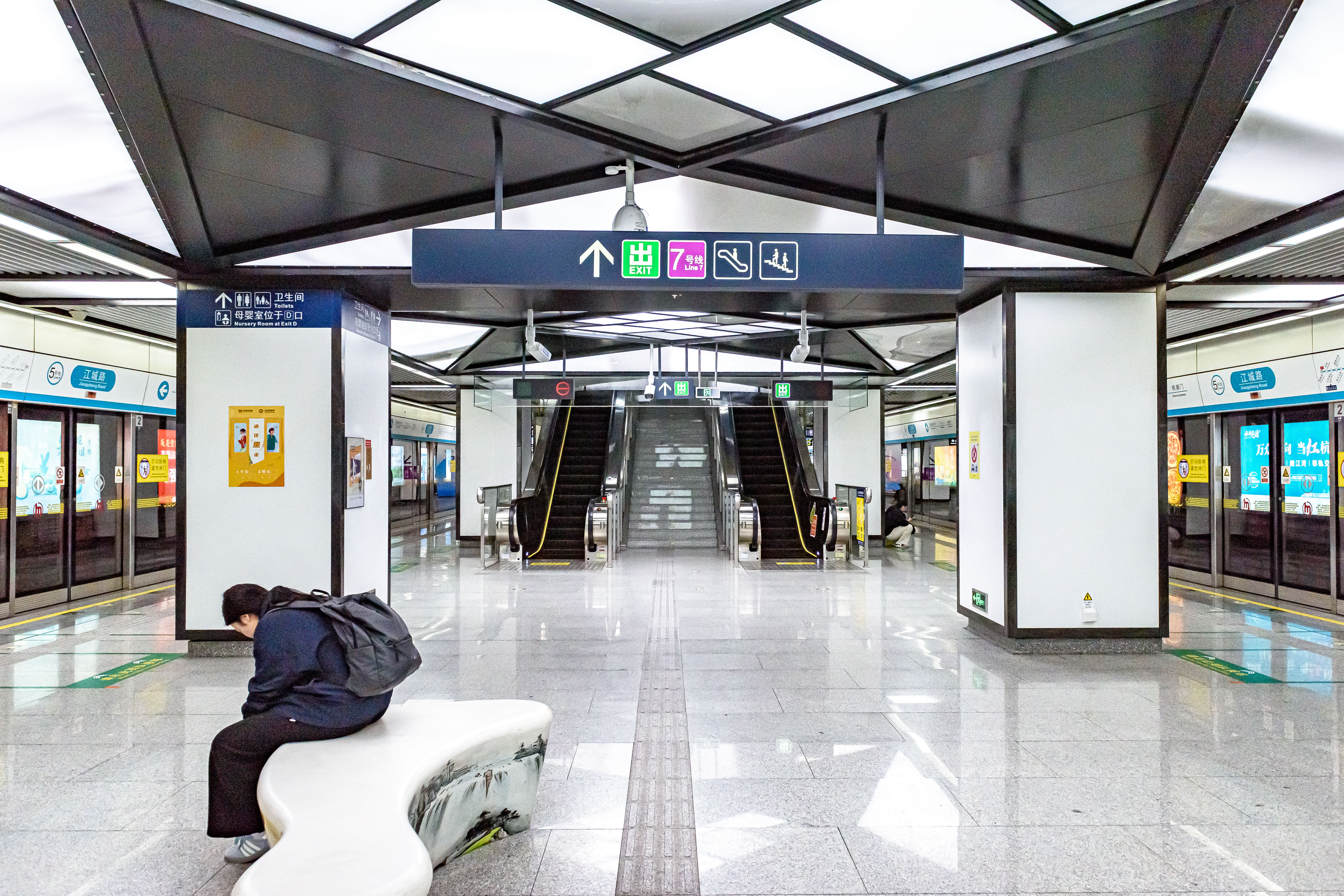
- Platform of Line 5

General information
- Location: Shangcheng District, Hangzhou, Zhejiang; China
- Operator: Hangzhou Metro Corporation
- Lines: Line 5 Line 7
- Platforms: 2 (1 island platform)

History
- Opened: April 23, 2020 (Line 5); April 1, 2022 (Line 7)

Services
Preceding station	Hangzhou Metro	Following station
Chengzhan towards East Nanhu	Line 5	Houchaomen towards Guniangqiao
Wushan Square Terminus	Line 7	Moyetang towards Jiangdong'er Road
Location

Jiangcheng Road (Chinese: 江城路) is a metro station on Line 5 and 7 of the Hangzhou Metro in China. It is located in the Shangcheng District of Hangzhou.
