= Zhenning Road station =

Hangzhou Metro station

Coordinates: 30°13′13″N 120°15′53″E

Zhenning Road 振宁路
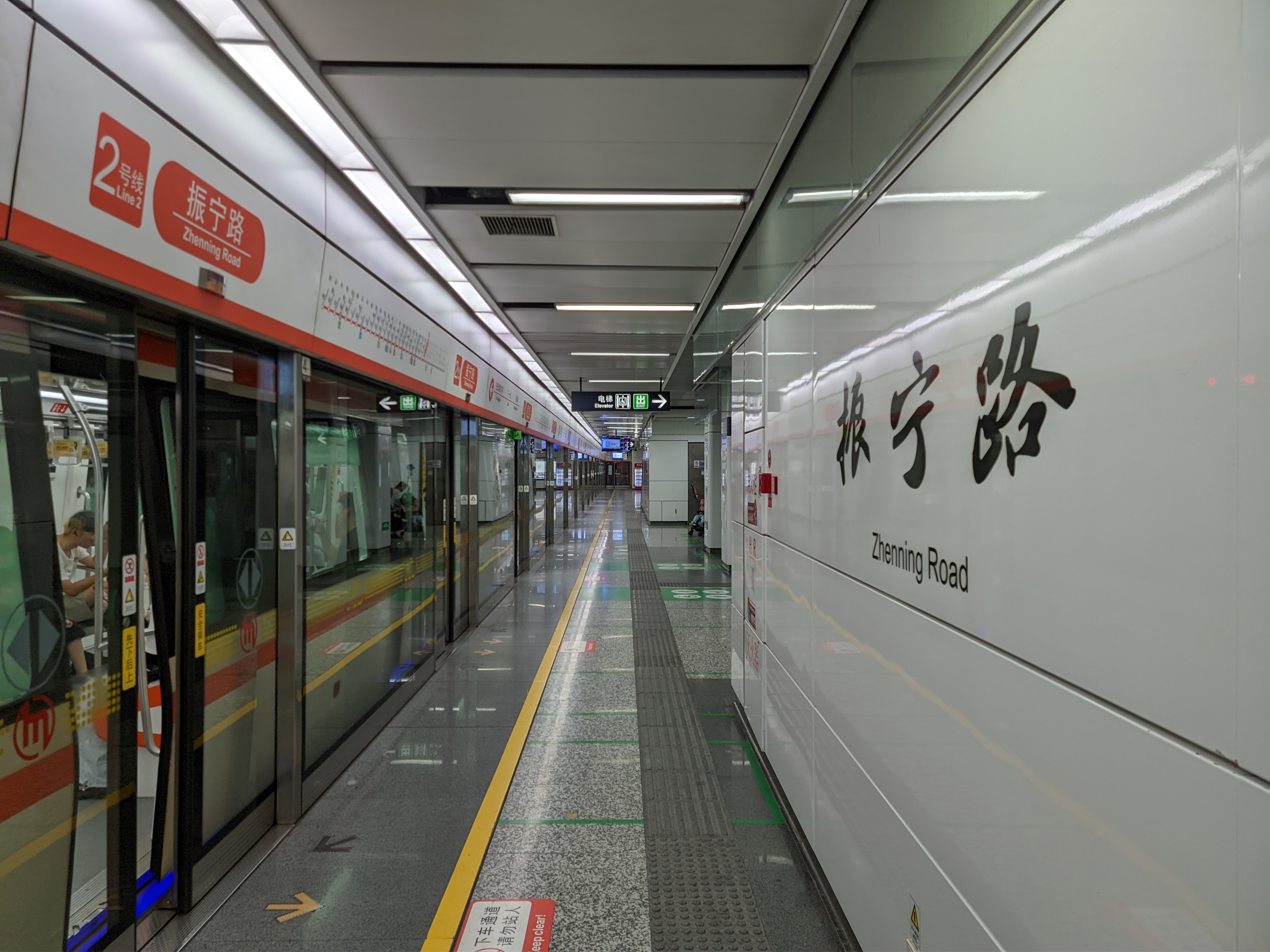
- Platform

General information
- Location: Xiaoshan District, Hangzhou, Zhejiang; China
- Operated by: Hangzhou Metro Corporation
- Line: Line 2

History
- Opened: November 24, 2014

Services
Preceding station	Hangzhou Metro	Following station
Jianshesan Road towards Chaoyang	Line 2	Feihong Road towards Liangzhu
Location

Zhenning Road (Chinese: 振宁路) is a metro station on Line 2 of the Hangzhou Metro in China. It is located in the Xiaoshan District of Hangzhou. This station has four exits.
