= JDE =

JDE may refer to:

- Java (programming language) Development Environment
- Jacobs Douwe Egberts, a Dutch coffee and tea company
- Journal of Development Economics
- JD Edwards, a software company
- Jiangdong'er Road station, a station on the Line 7 of Hangzhou Metro in China
- The Julian day count, also known as the JDE for Julian Day (Ephemeris) or Julian Ephemeris Day
