= Qicheng Road station =

Metro station in China

Qicheng Road 启成路
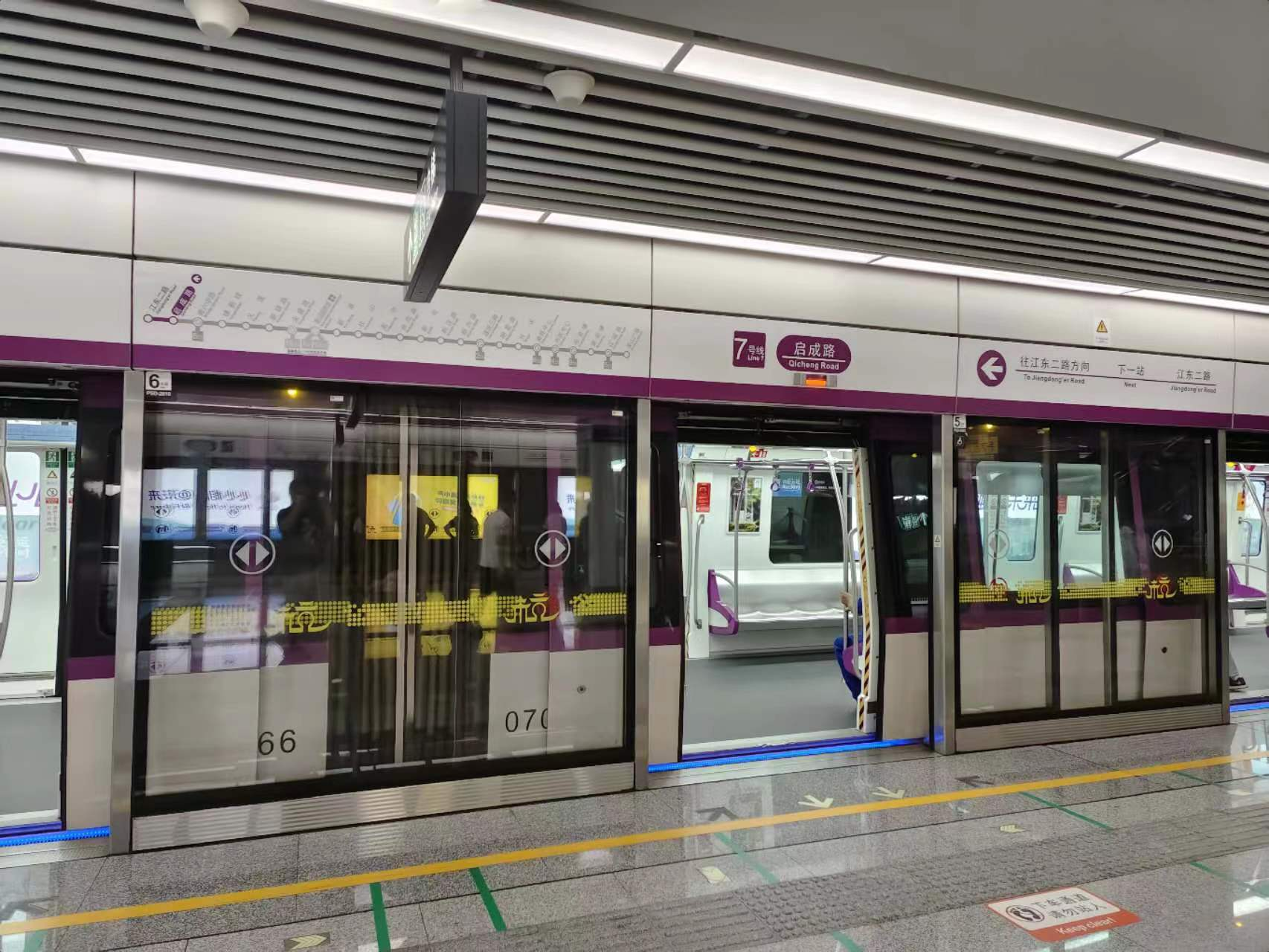

General information
- Location: Qiantang District, Hangzhou, Zhejiang; China
- Coordinates: 30.314295°N 120.49026°E
- Operator: Hangzhou Metro Corporation
- Line: Line 7
- Platforms: 2 (1 island platform)

History
- Opened: 30 December 2020

Services
Preceding station	Hangzhou Metro	Following station
Middle Qingliu Road towards Wushan Square	Line 7	Jiangdong'er Road Terminus
Location

Qicheng Road (Chinese: 启成路) is a metro station on Line 7 of the Hangzhou Metro in China. Opened on 30 December 2020, it is located in the Qiantang District of Hangzhou.

== Gallery ==
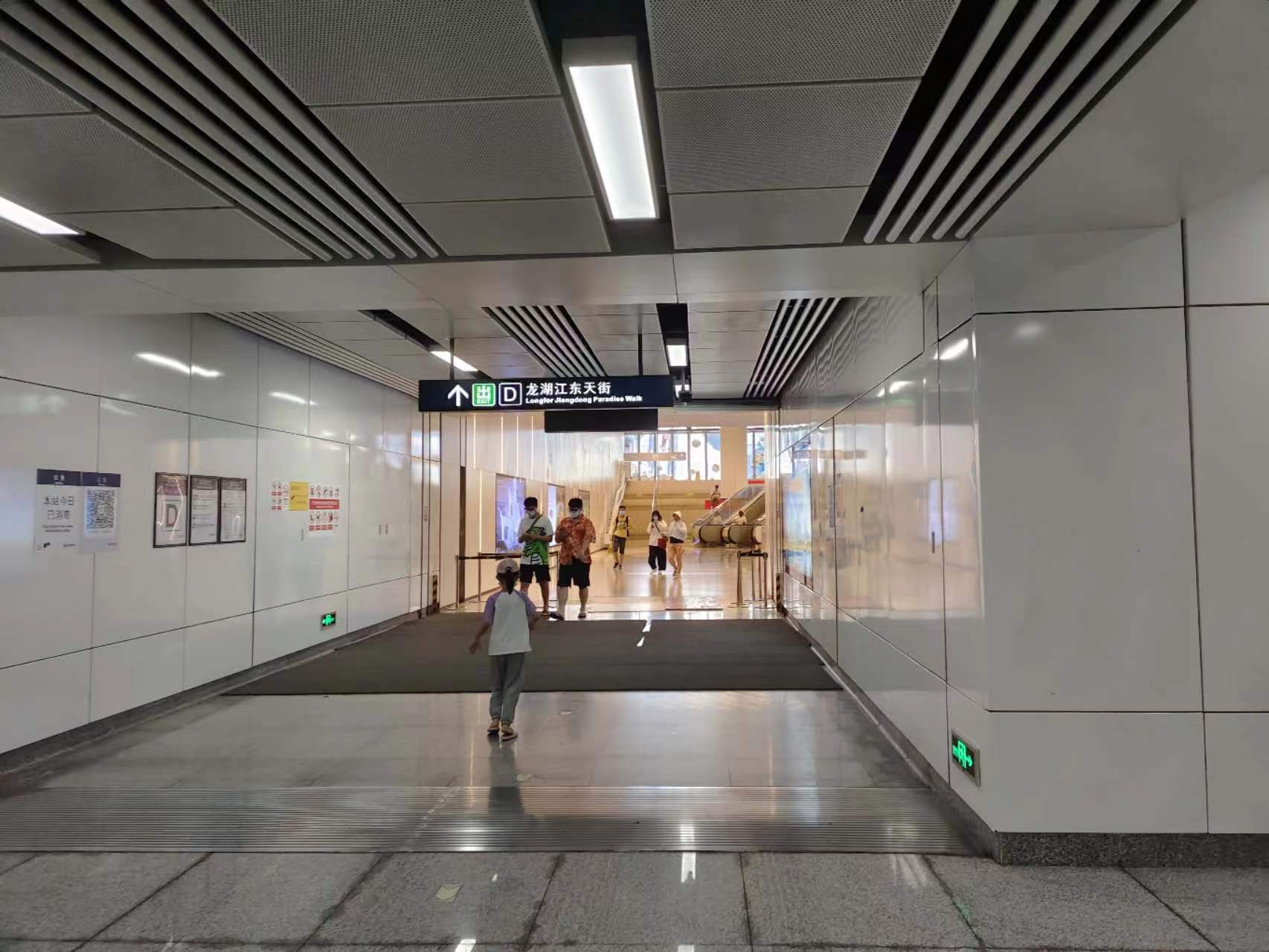
Exit D

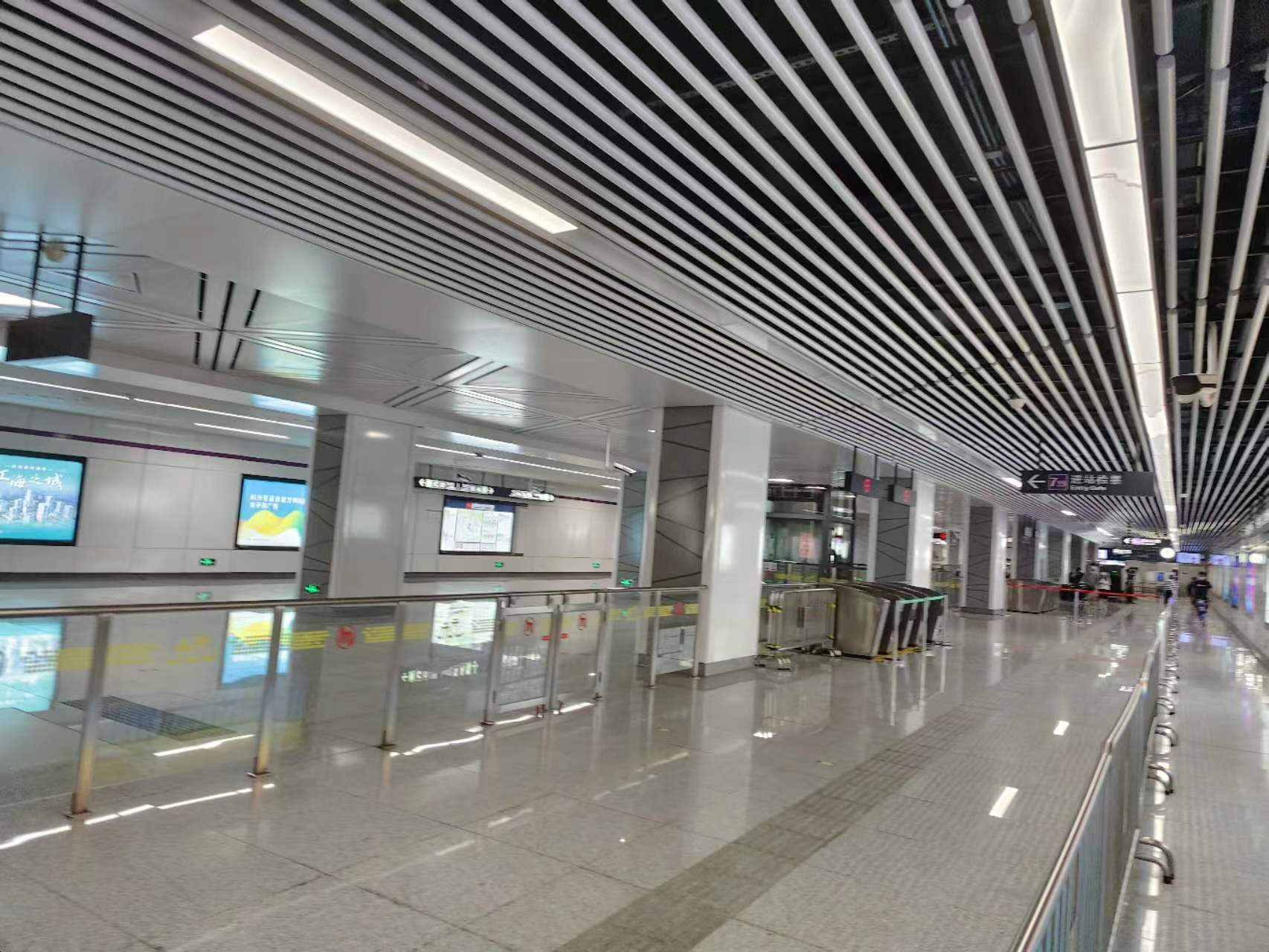
Concourse

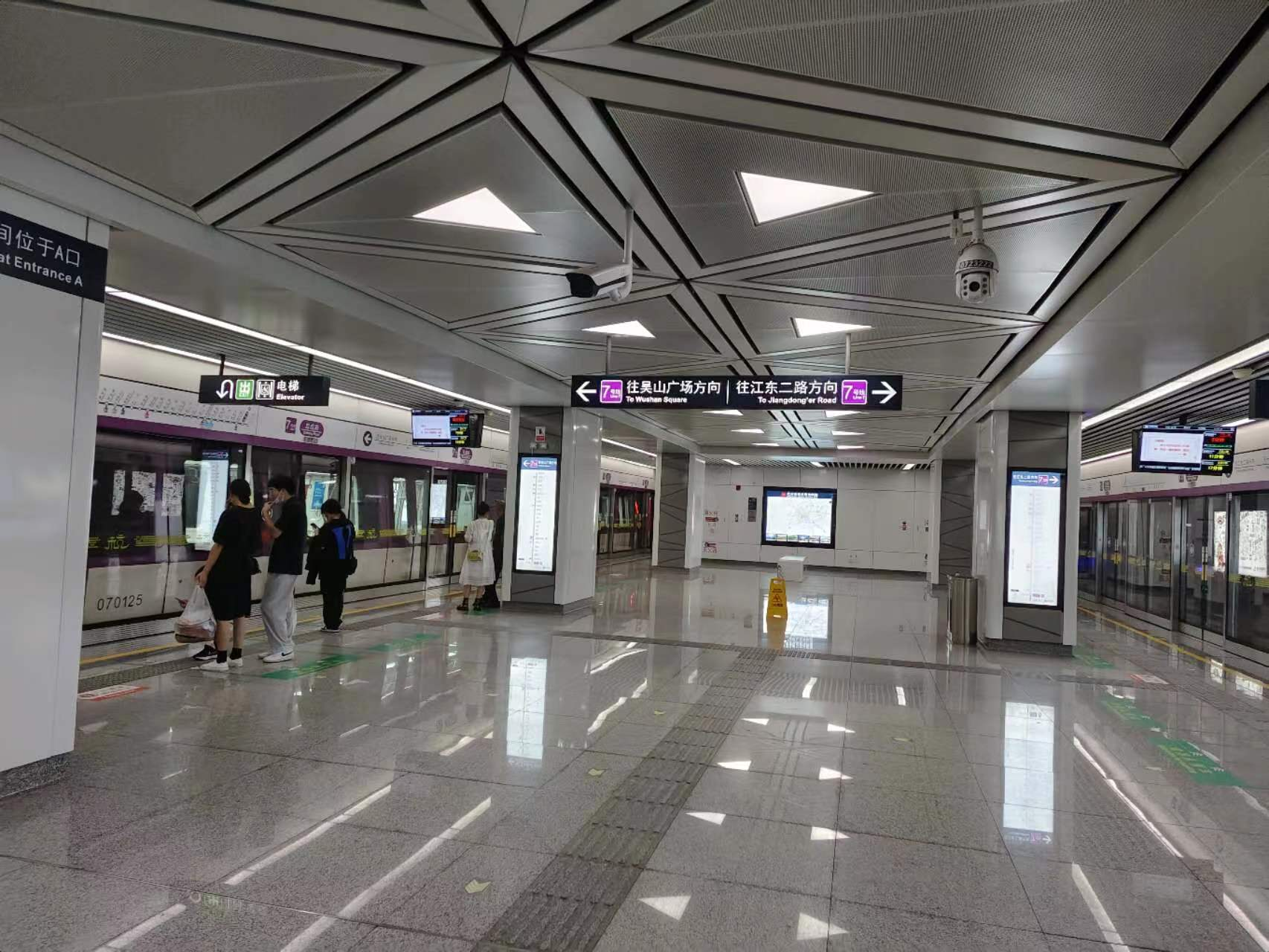
Platform
