= Yingfeng Road station =

Hangzhou Metro station

Coordinates: 30°14′21″N 120°14′53″E

Yingfeng Road 盈丰路
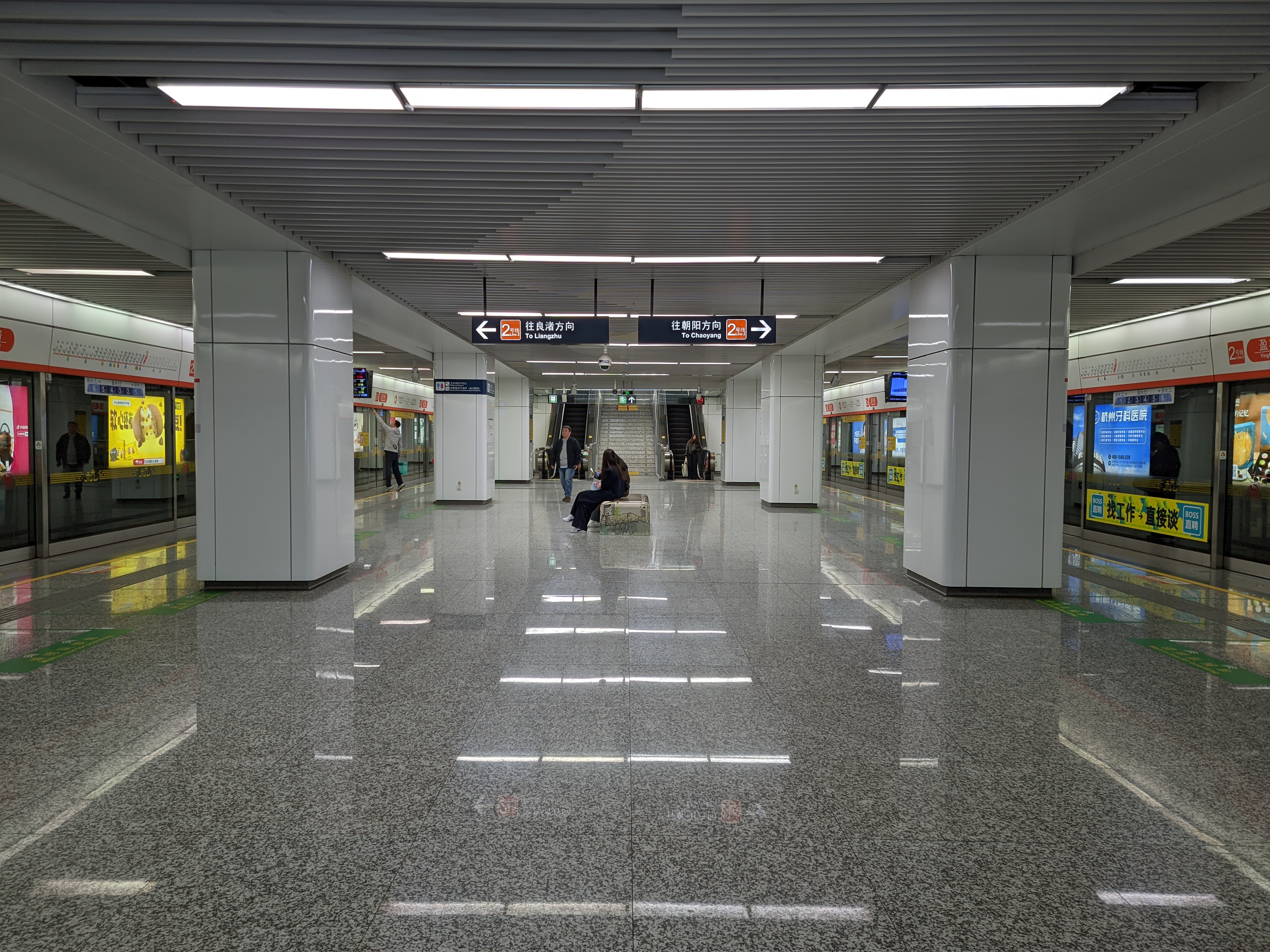
- Platforms

General information
- Location: Shixin Rd.(N) × Yingfeng Rd. Xiaoshan District, Hangzhou, Zhejiang; China
- Operated by: Hangzhou Metro Corporation
- Line(s): Line 2
- Platforms: 2 (1 island platform)

Other information
- Station code: YFL

History
- Opened: November 24, 2014

Services
Preceding station	Hangzhou Metro	Following station
Feihong Road towards Chaoyang	Line 2	Qianjiang Century City towards Liangzhu

Yingfeng Road (Chinese: 盈丰路) is a metro station on Line 2 of the Hangzhou Metro in China. It is located in the Xiaoshan District of Hangzhou. This station has four exits.
