= Yiz =

Yiz or YIZ may refer to:

- Azhe language, spoken in Yunnan province, China, by ISO 639 code
- Yinzhou, Ningbo, a district of Ningbo, Zhejiang, China; see List of administrative divisions of Zhejiang
- Yingzhong station, a train station in Hangzhou, Zhejiang, China
