= Line 7 (Hangzhou Metro) =

Metro line of the Hangzhou Metro system in China

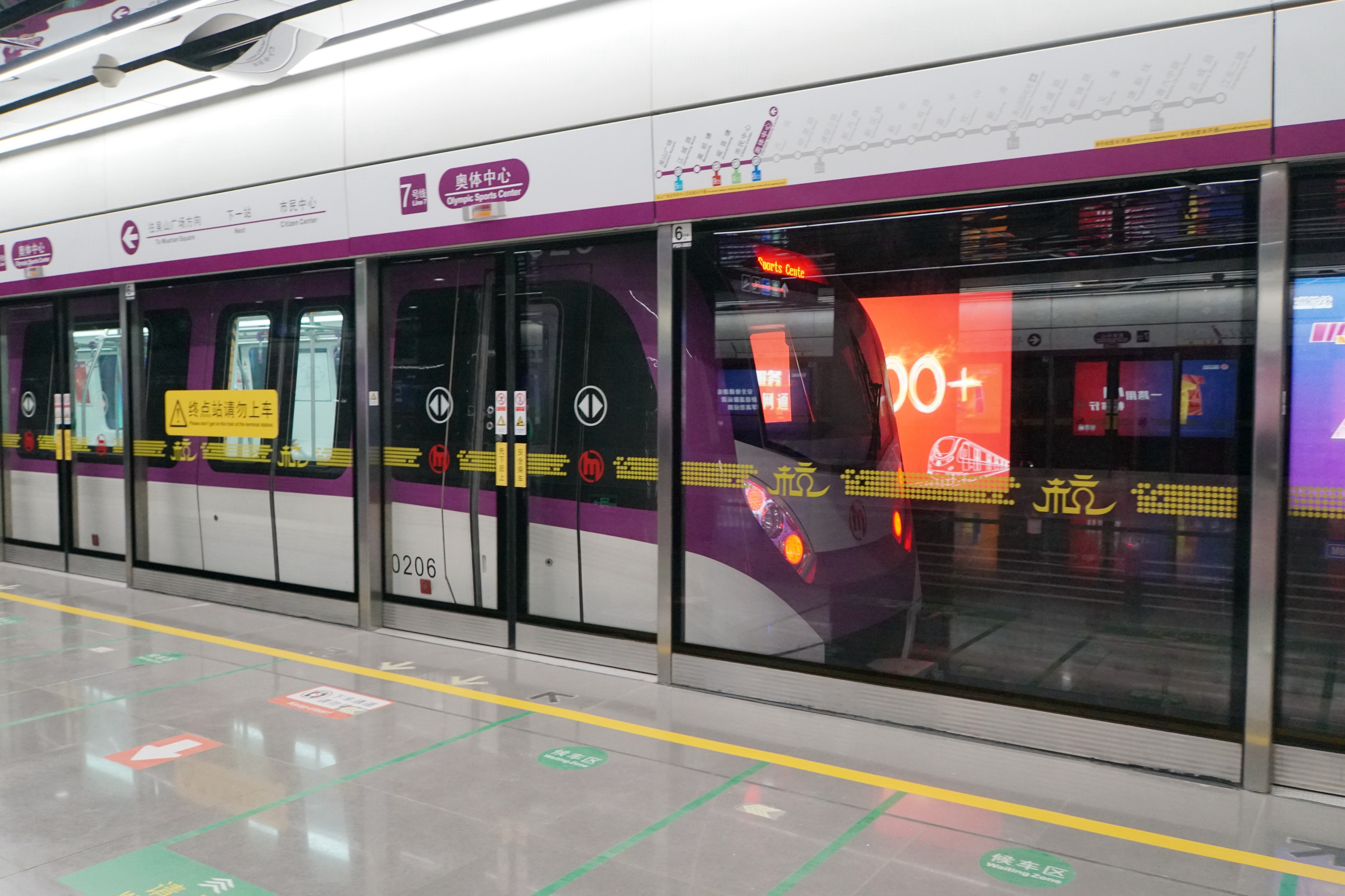
- Train of Line 7 is departing from Olympic Sports Center

Overview
- Status: Operational
- Owner: City of Hangzhou
- Locale: Hangzhou, Zhejiang, China
- Termini: Wushan Square; Jiangdong'er Road
- Stations: 24

Service
- Type: Rapid transit
- System: Hangzhou Metro
- Services: 1
- Operator(s): Hangzhou Metro Corporation
- Depot(s): Yingzhong Depot; Jiangdongsan Road Stabling Yard
- Rolling stock: PM157

History
- Opened: 30 December 2020; 5 years ago

Technical
- Line length: 47.48 km (29.50 mi)
- Character: Underground
- Track gauge: 1,435 mm (4 ft 8 1/2 in)
- Electrification: Overhead, 1500 V DC
- Operating speed: 100 km/h (62 mph)

Line 7 drawn to scale.

Line 7 of the Hangzhou Metro (simplified Chinese: 杭州地铁七号线; traditional Chinese: 杭州地鐵七號線; pinyin: Hángzhōu Dìtiě Qīhào Xiàn) is a metro line in Hangzhou. The line is 47.48 km long and will run in a west–east direction between Wushan Square station in Shangcheng District and Jiangdong'er Road station in Qiantang District in the east, passing through downtown Hangzhou and providing transfers with multiple other lines in the system. The section between Olympic Sports Center Station and Jiangdong'er Road Station was opened on 30 December 2020; the remaining section opened on 1 April 2022. The line is colored purple on maps.

== Opening timeline ==
Segment	Commencement	Length	Station(s)	Name
Olympic Sports Center — Jiangdong'er Road	30 December 2020	39.62 km	19	Initial Section of Phase 1
Olympic Sports Center — Citizen Center	17 September 2021	3 km	1	Central Section of Phase 1
Citizen Center — Wushan Square (except Moyetang)	1 April 2022	6 km	4	Remaining Section of Phase 1
Moyetang	22 April 2022	-	1	Infill station

== Stations ==
Legend

- Operational
- Under construction

Station name		Connections	Distance km		Location	Opening date
English	Chinese	Connections	Distance km		Location	Opening date
Wushan Square	吴山广场		0	0	Shangcheng	1 April 2022
Jiangcheng Road	江城路	5			Shangcheng	1 April 2022
Moyetang	莫邪塘	18			Shangcheng	22 April 2022
Guanyintang	观音塘	9			Shangcheng	1 April 2022
Citizen Center	市民中心	4			Shangcheng	17 September 2021
Olympic Sports Center	奥体中心	6			Binjiang	30 December 2020
Xingyi	兴议				Xiaoshan	30 December 2020
Mingxing Road	明星路	15			Xiaoshan	30 December 2020
Jianshesan Road	建设三路	2			Xiaoshan	30 December 2020
Xinxing Road	新兴路				Xiaoshan	30 December 2020
Xinhan Road	新汉路				Xiaoshan	30 December 2020
Xinjie	新街				Xiaoshan	30 December 2020
Hehuan Road	合欢路				Xiaoshan	30 December 2020
Yingzhong	盈中				Xiaoshan	30 December 2020
Kanshan	坎山				Xiaoshan	30 December 2020
Xingang	新港				Xiaoshan	30 December 2020
Xiaoshan International Airport	萧山国际机场	1 19 HGH			Xiaoshan	30 December 2020
Yongsheng Road	永盛路	19			Xiaoshan	30 December 2020
Xinzhen Road	新镇路				Qiantang	30 December 2020
Yipeng	义蓬				Qiantang	30 December 2020
Tangxinxian	塘新线				Qiantang	30 December 2020
Middle Qingliu Road	青六中路	8			Qiantang	30 December 2020
Qicheng Road	启成路				Qiantang	30 December 2020
Jiangdong'er Road	江东二路				Qiantang	30 December 2020

== Rolling stock ==
Stock	Class	Year built	Builder	Number built	Numbers	Formation	Depots	Line assigned	Notes
PM157	A	2020-2022	CRRC Nanjing Puzhen	204 (34 sets)	07 001 - 07 034 (070011-070346)	Tc+Mp+M+M+Mp+Tc	Jiangdongsan Road Yard; Yingzhong Depot	7	

== See also ==
- Hangzhou Metro
