= Wushan Square station =

Station of Hangzhou Metro

Coordinates: 30°14′32″N 120°09′36″E

Wushan Square 吴山广场
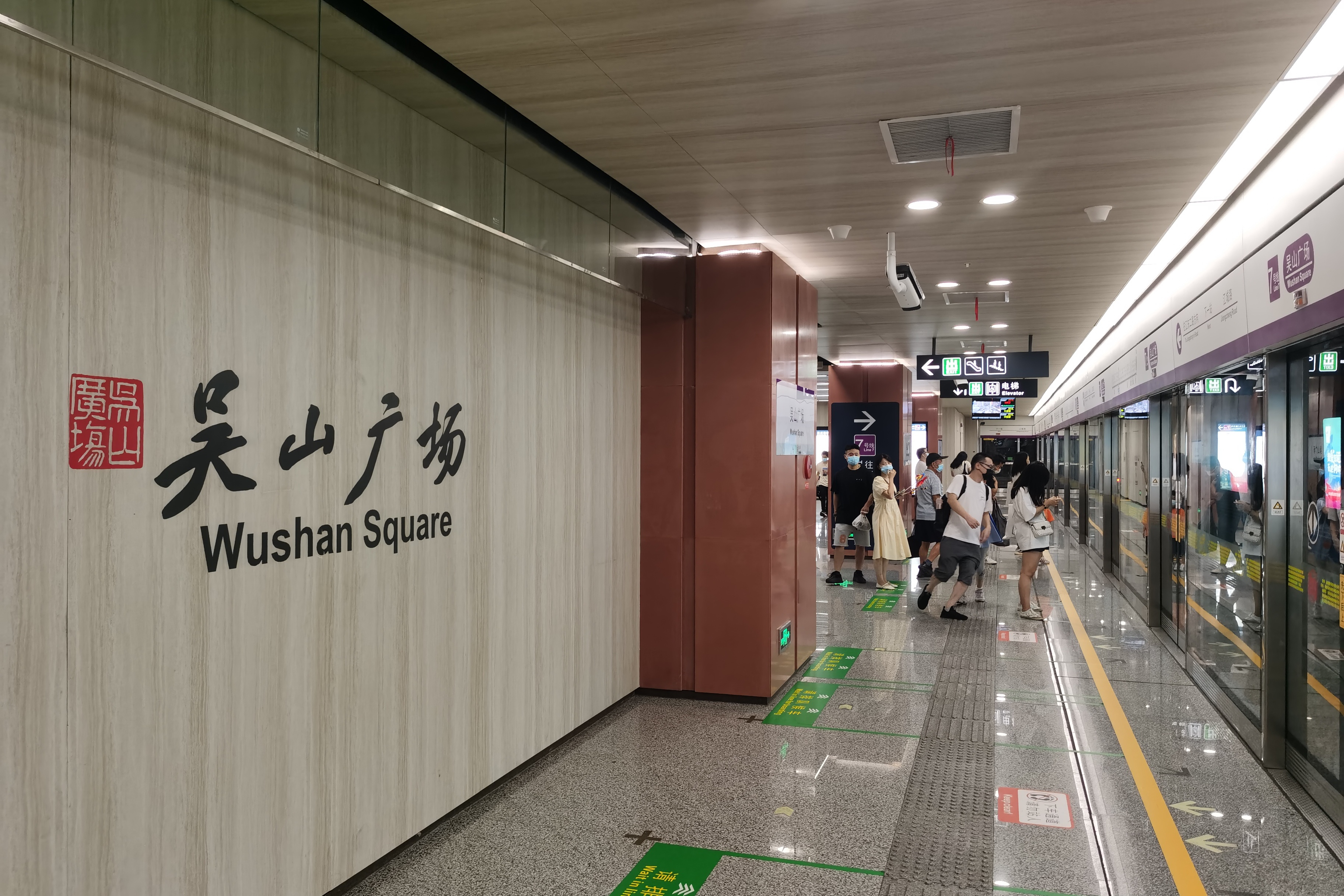

General information
- Location: Shangcheng District, Hangzhou, Zhejiang; China
- Operated by: Hangzhou Metro Corporation
- Line(s): Line 7
- Platforms: 2 (1 island platform)

History
- Opened: April 1, 2022

Services
Preceding station	Hangzhou Metro	Following station
Terminus	Line 7	Jiangcheng Road towards Jiangdong'er Road

Wushan Square (Chinese: 吴山广场) is the west terminus of Line 7 of the Hangzhou Metro in China. It is located in the Shangcheng District of Hangzhou. The station opened on April 1, 2022, after five years of construction.

== Gallery ==
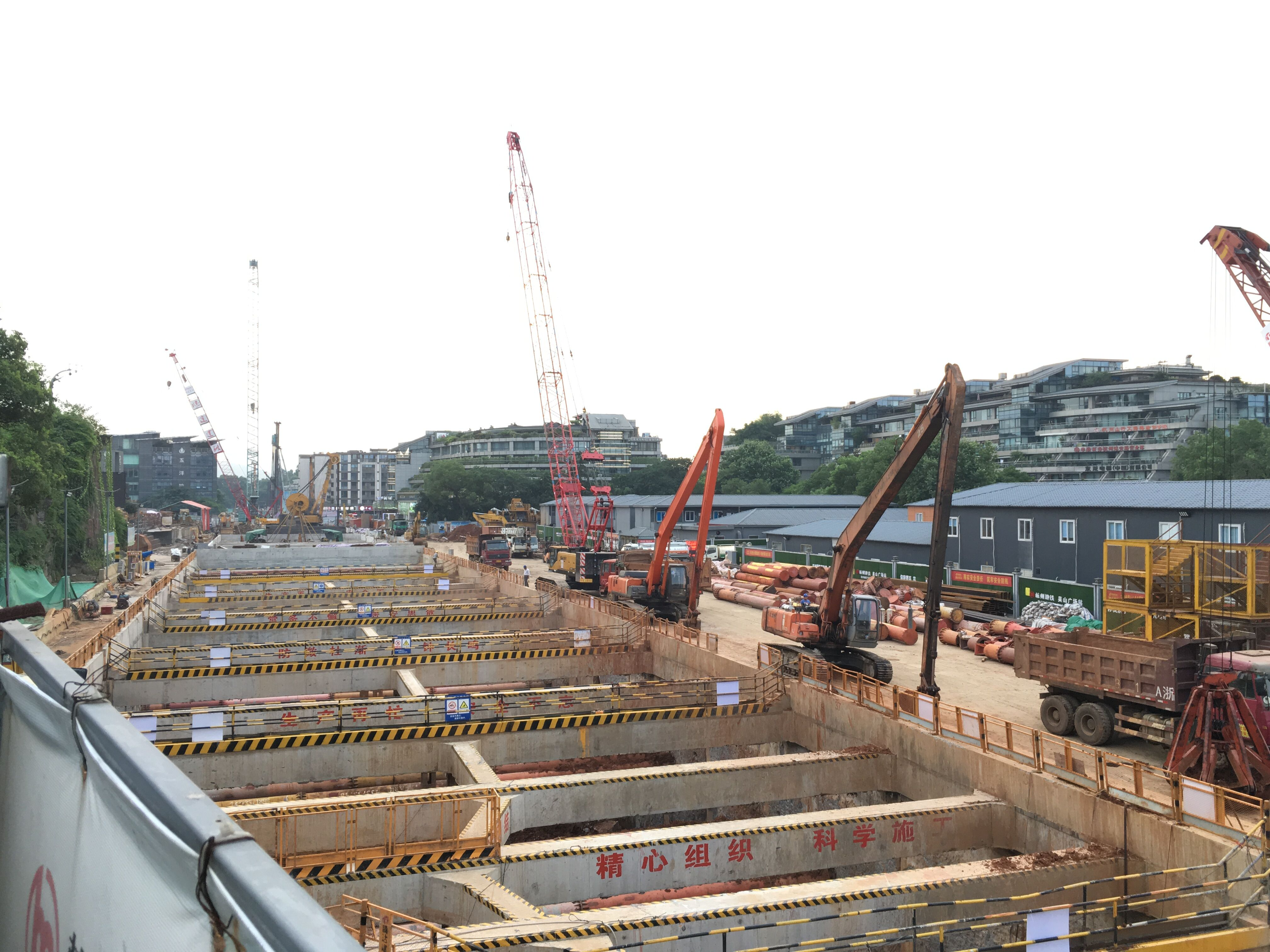
Wushan Square station under construction in July 2019

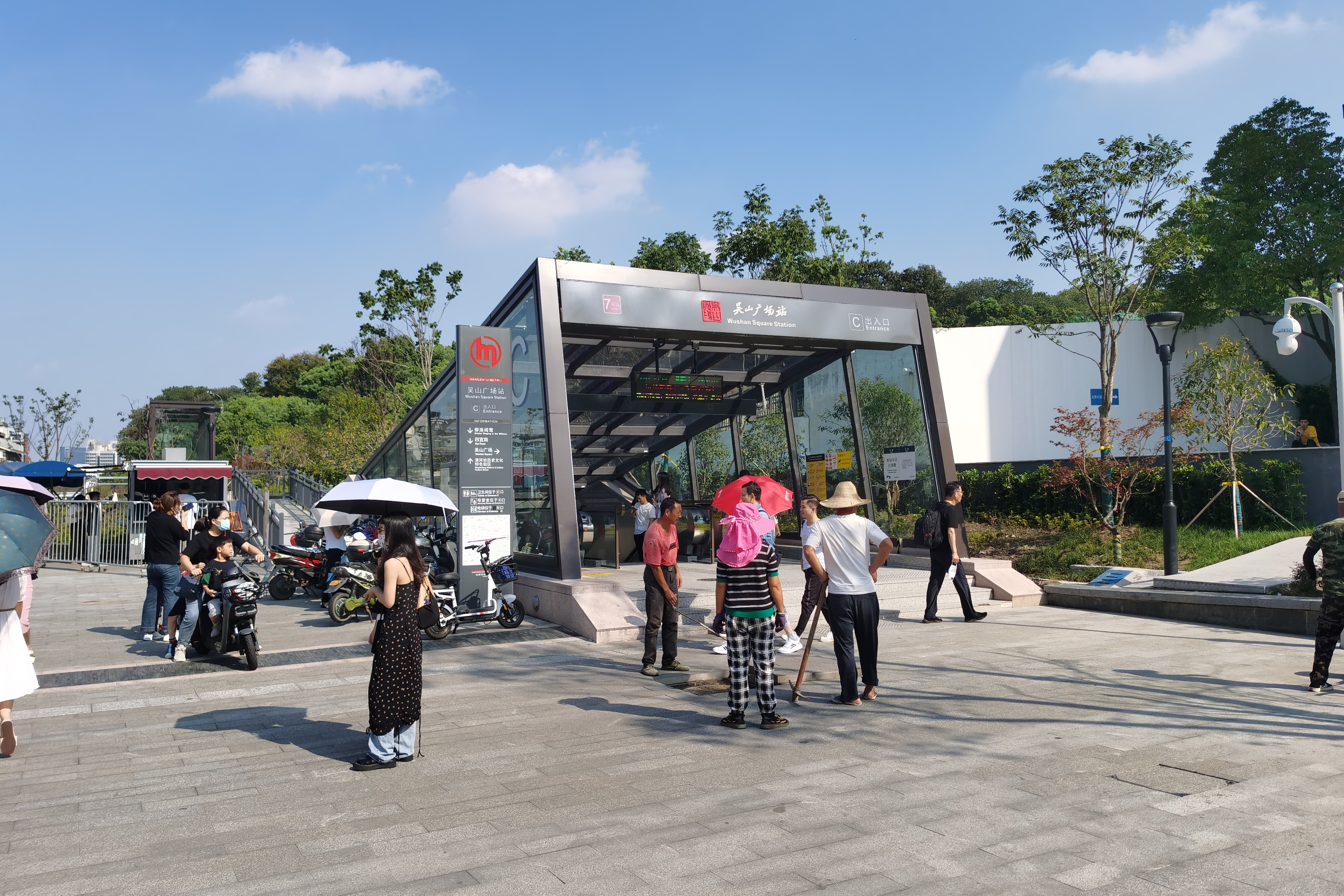
Entrance C

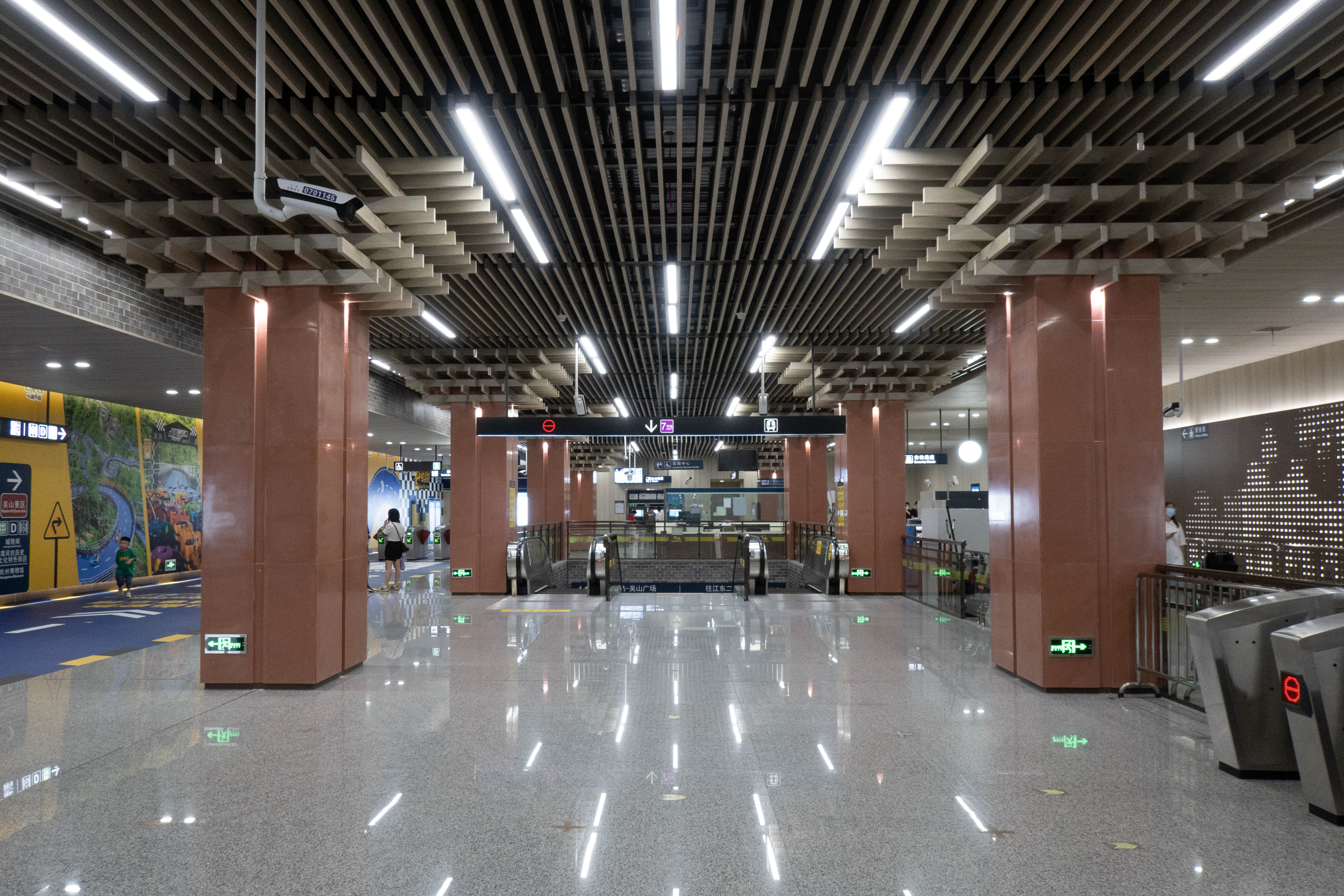
Concourse

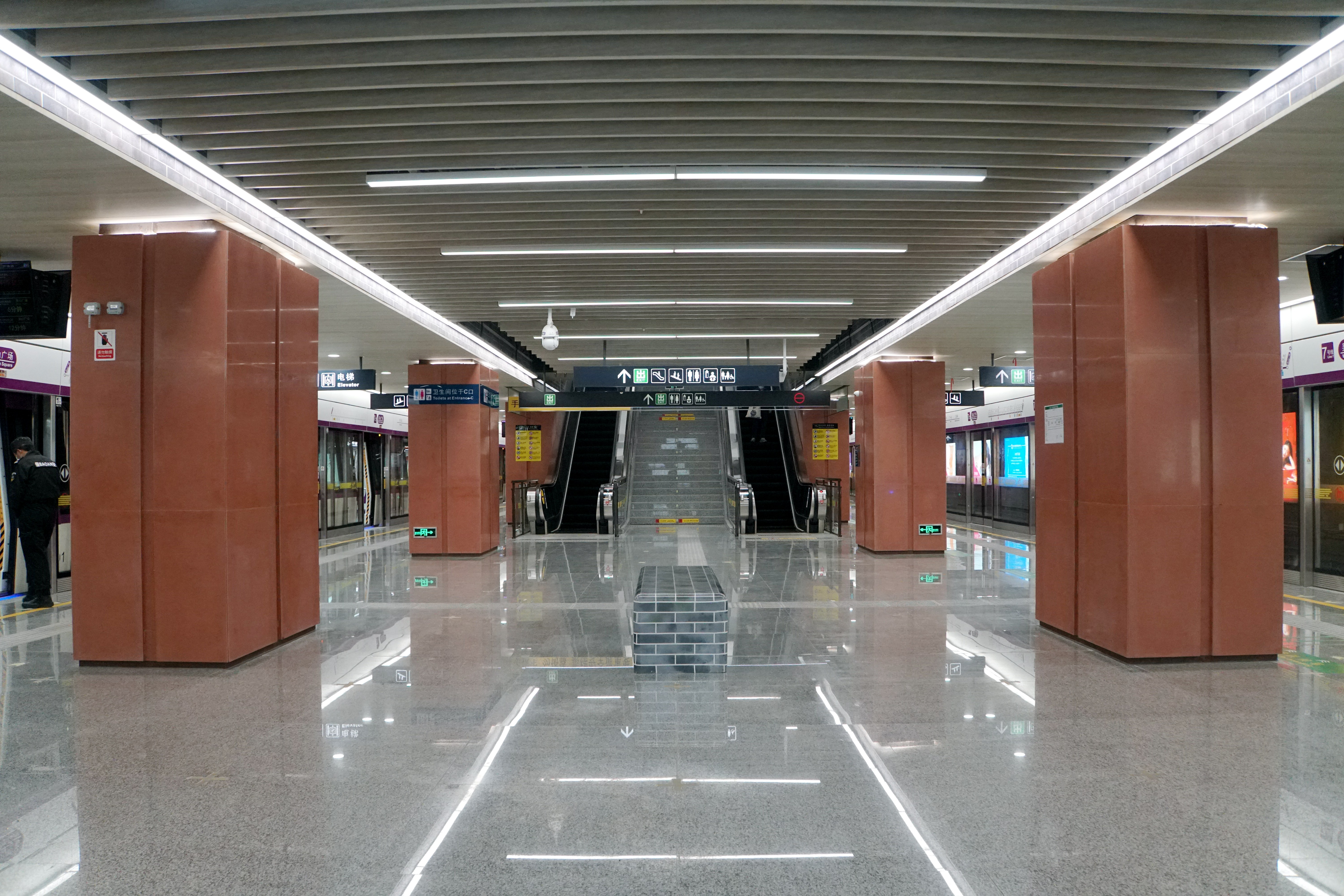
Platform
