= Xiaoshan, Hangzhou =

District in Zhejiang, China

Xiaoshan 萧山区 Siaoshan
- District
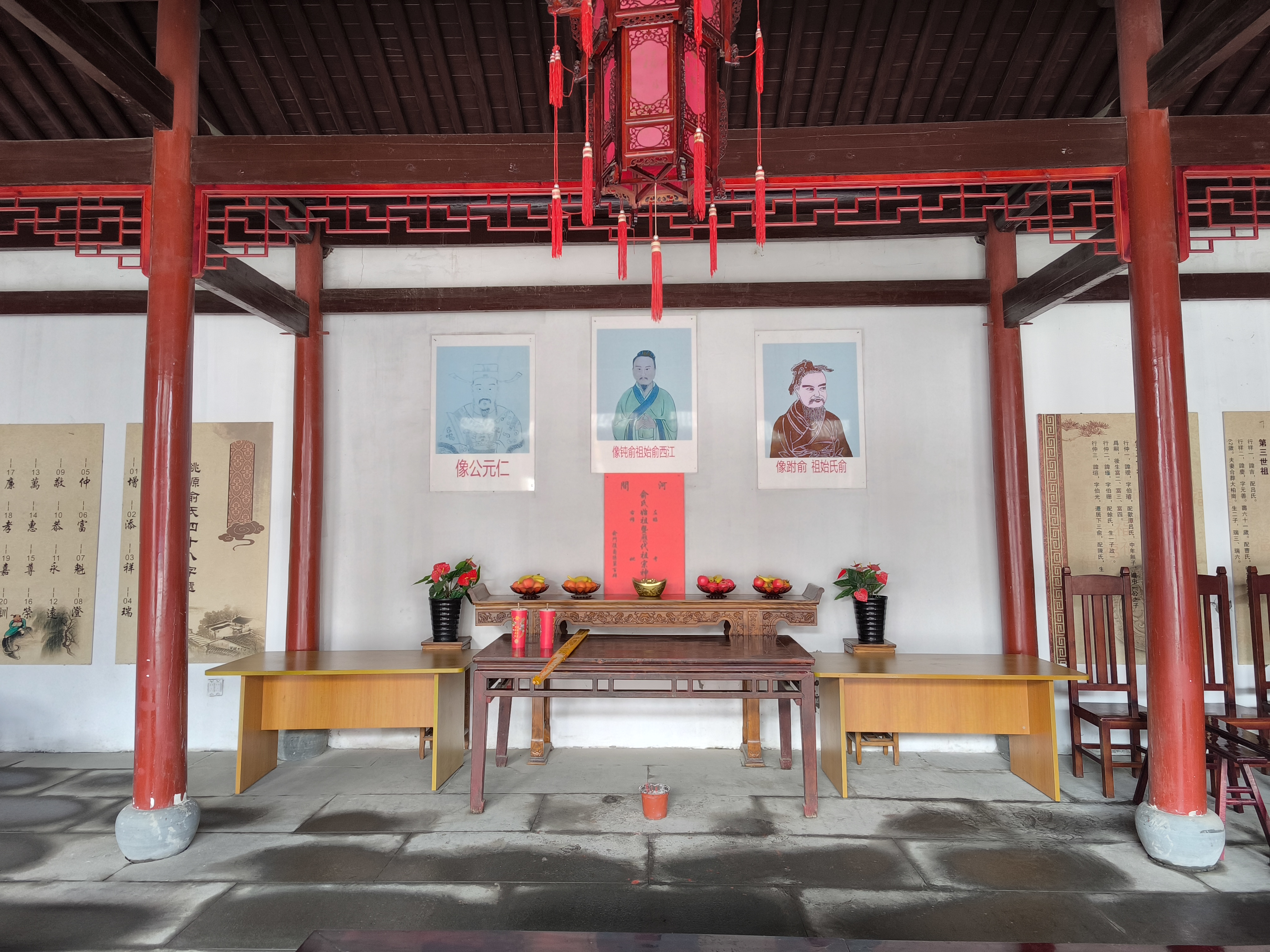
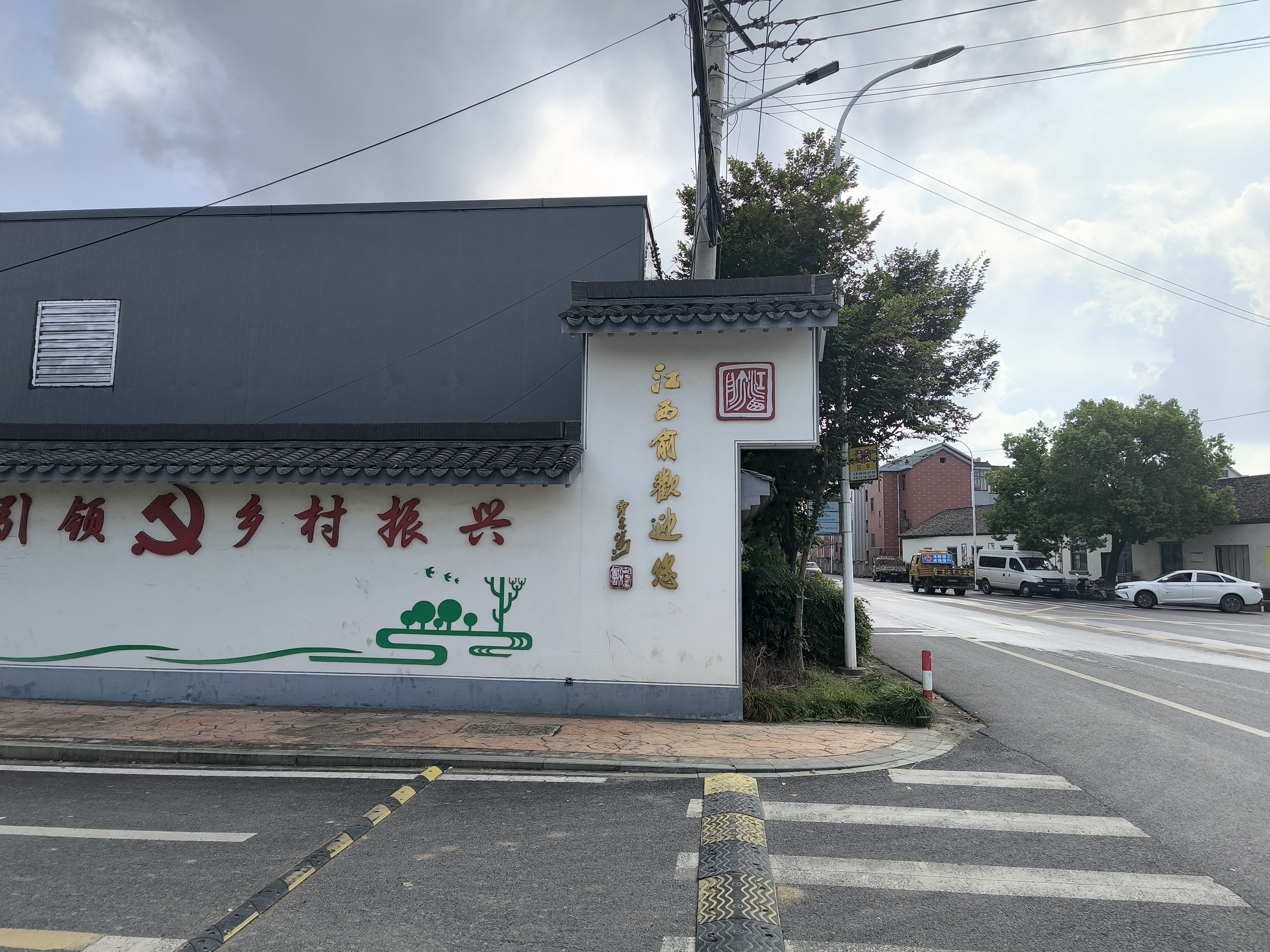
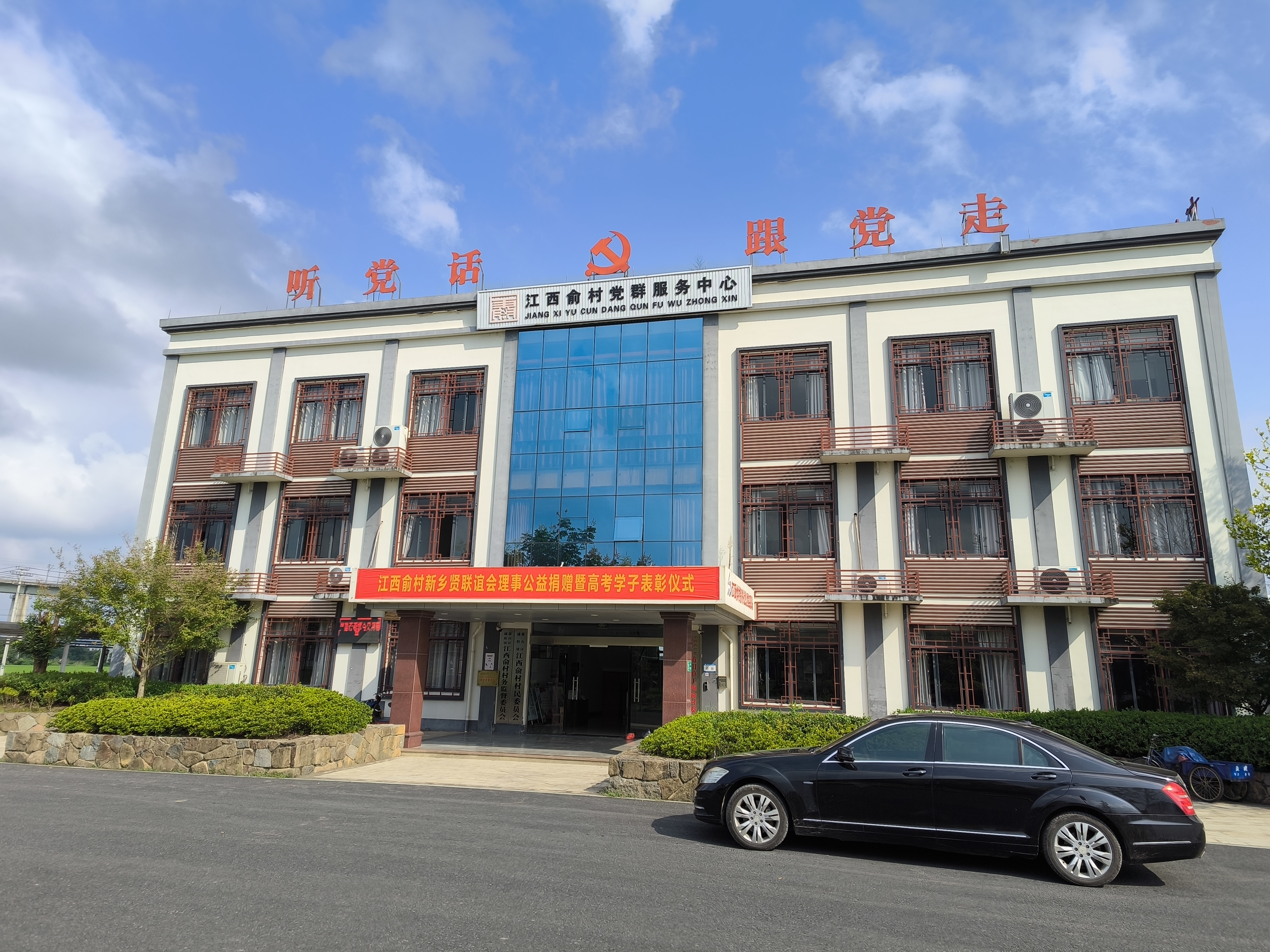
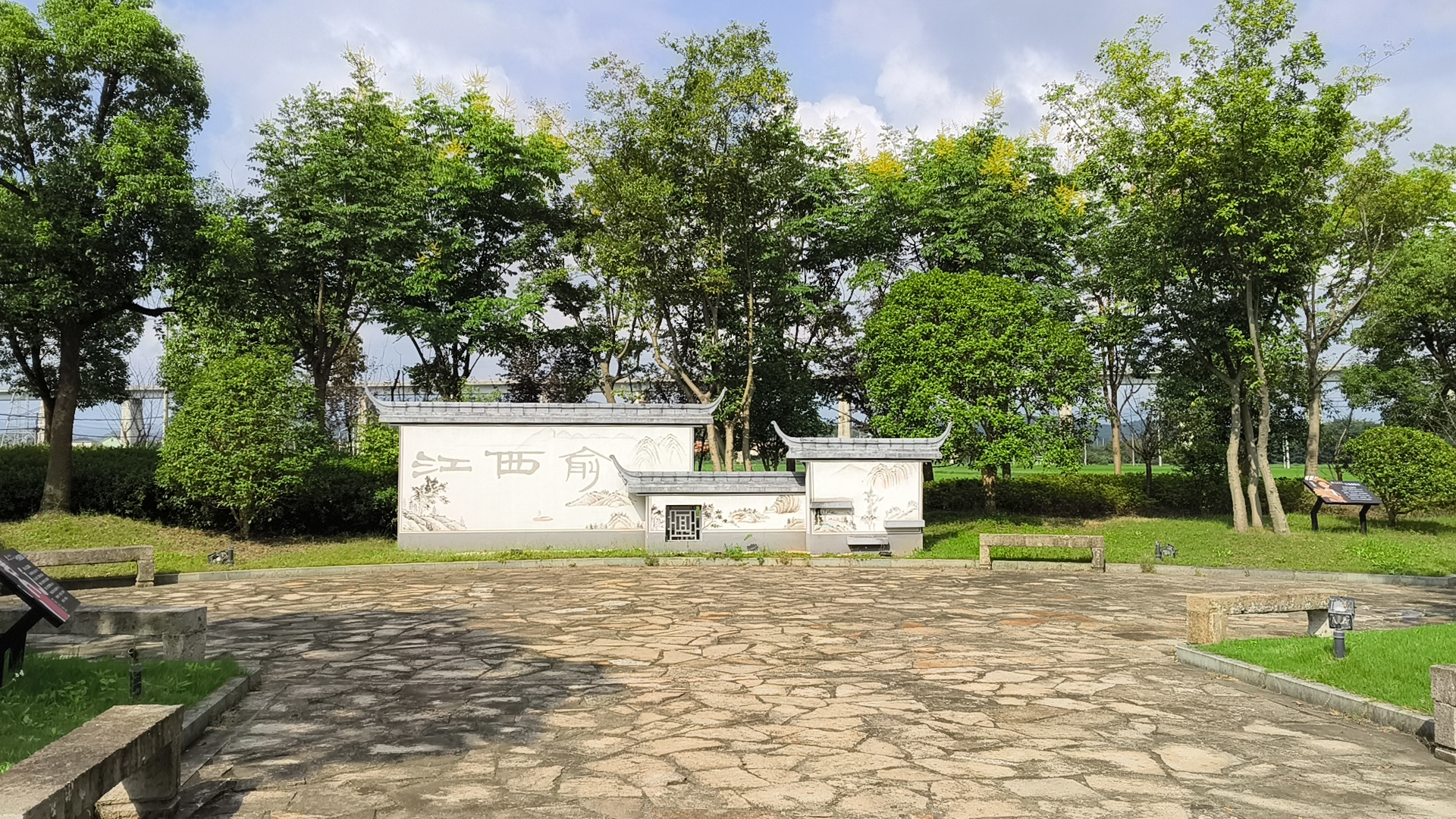
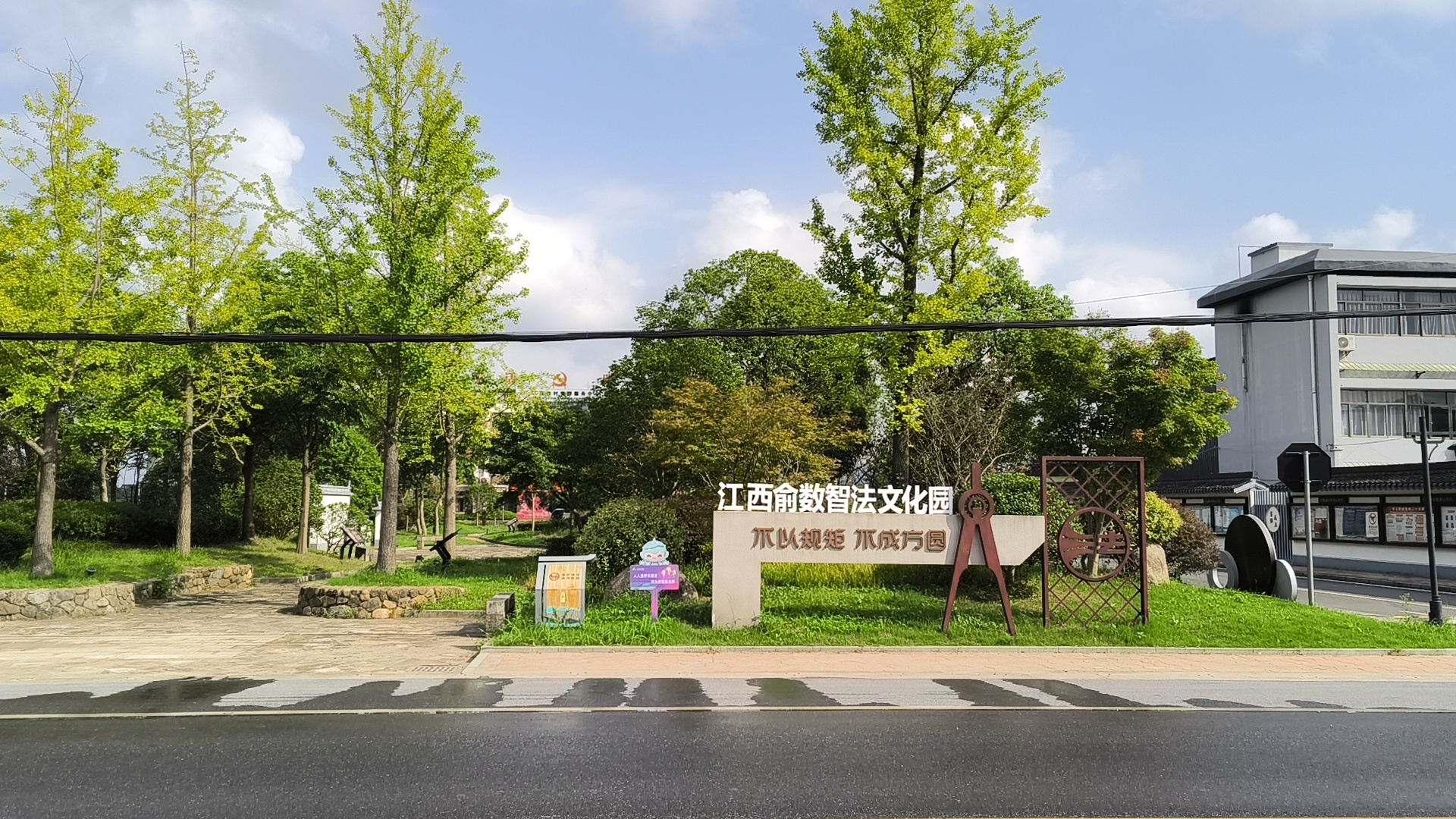
- Jiangxiyu Village, Xiaoshan

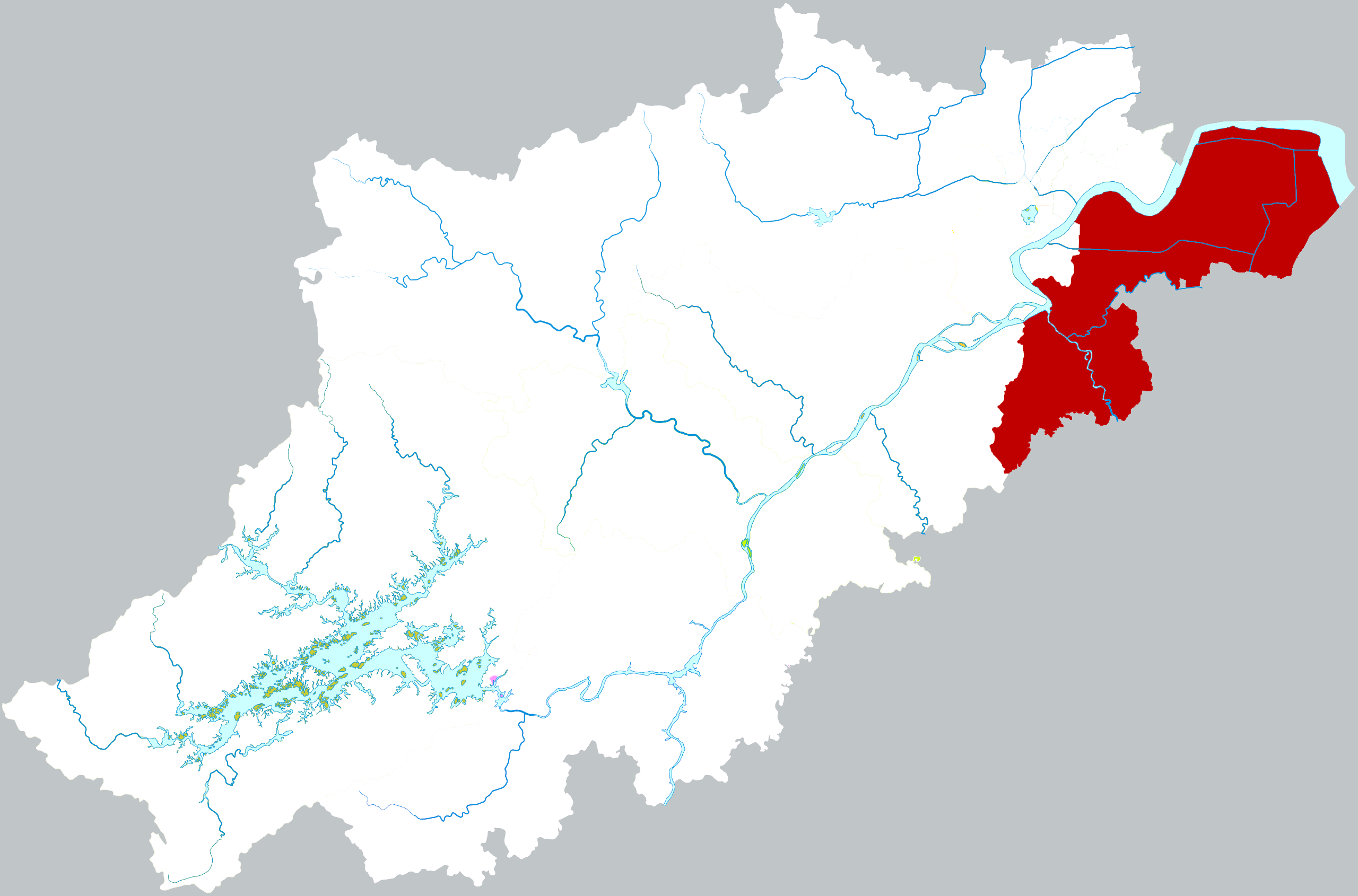
- Location of Xiaoshan District within Hangzhou

- Location in Zhejiang
- Coordinates: 30°10′N 120°15′E
- Country: People's Republic of China
- Province: Zhejiang
- Sub-provincial city: Hangzhou

Area
  - Total: 1,417.83 km^{2} (547.43 sq mi)

Population (2022)
  - Total: 1,240,100
  - Density: 874.65/km^{2} (2,265.3/sq mi)
- Time zone: UTC+8 (China Standard)

Xiaoshan, Hangzhou
- Simplified Chinese: 萧山区
- Traditional Chinese: 蕭山區
Transcriptions
Standard Mandarin
- Hanyu Pinyin: Xiāoshān Qū

Xiaoshan is a suburban district of Hangzhou, Zhejiang, China. It was formerly a city in its own right, separated by the Qiantang River from Hangzhou proper, but the municipality was annexed by its more populous neighbor in 2001.

Xiaoshan has a permanent population with residential rights of around 1,511,000 and an additional non-permanent population of about 876,500. Most of the local residents are Han people who speak a local variety of Wu Chinese in addition to Mandarin Chinese. The area's history of human settlement dates back to more than 8000 years ago, as excavations at Xiaoshan's Kuahuqiao archeological site have shown. Xiaoshan's manufacturing-dominated economy has made it one of the most affluent metropolitan districts in China. In 2012 it had a GDP of 161.2 billion CNY, or around $17,000 per capita. Hangzhou's international airport, Hangzhou Xiaoshan International Airport, is located in western Xiaoshan, close to the mouth of Hangzhou Bay. The district is also at the center of one of China's local real estate booms, as the demand for newer, more upscale housing from China's growing middle class has led to an explosion in construction of new high-rise condominiums. In addition, Hangzhou Xiaoshan Sports Centre is also found in Xiaoshan.

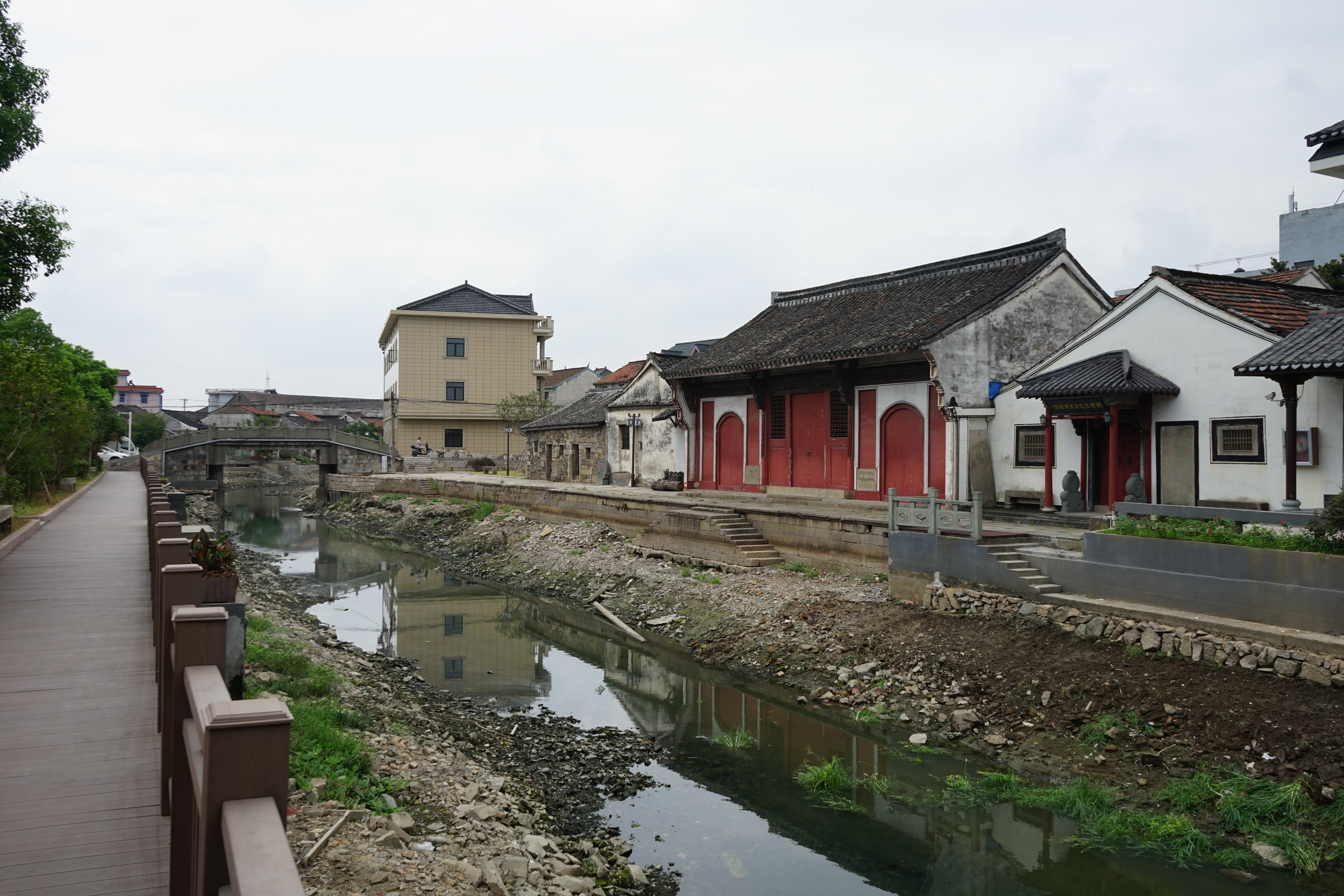
The Beijing-Hangzhou Grand Canal in Xiaoshan

The local culture is deeply rooted in the area's communist character, and the Chinese Communist Party has a strong local presence and an estimated local membership of 250,000.

== Administrative divisions ==
Subdistricts:

- Chengxiang Subdistrict (城厢街道), Beigan Subdistrict (北干街道), Shushan Subdistrict (蜀山街道), Xintang Subdistrict (新塘街道)

Towns:

- Louta (楼塔镇), Heshang (河上镇), Daicun (戴村镇), Puyang (浦阳镇), Jinhua (进化镇), Linpu (临浦镇), Yiqiao (义桥镇), Suoqian (所前镇), Yaqian (衙前镇), Wenyan (闻堰镇), Ningwei (宁围镇), Xinjie (新街镇), Kanshan (坎山镇), Guali (瓜沥镇), Dangshan (党山镇), Yinong (益农镇), Jingjiang (靖江镇), Nanyang (南阳镇), Yipeng (义蓬镇), Hezhuang (河庄镇), Dangwan (党湾镇), Xinwan (新湾镇)

== Climate ==
The extreme maximum temperatures since 1951 recorded has ranged from 42.2 °C (108 °F) (July 25, August 1, 2003, and July 30, 2013), to −15 °C (5 °F) (January 5, 1977).

Climate data for Xiaoshan, elevation 97 m (318 ft), (1991–2020 normals, extremes 1951–present)
Month	Jan	Feb	Mar	Apr	May	Jun	Jul	Aug	Sep	Oct	Nov	Dec	Year
Record high °C (°F)	23.9 (75.0)	29.0 (84.2)	34.3 (93.7)	35.1 (95.2)	37.2 (99.0)	38.6 (101.5)	42.2 (108.0)	42.2 (108.0)	39.7 (103.5)	36.2 (97.2)	33.0 (91.4)	24.0 (75.2)	42.2 (108.0)
Mean daily maximum °C (°F)	8.8 (47.8)	11.3 (52.3)	16.1 (61.0)	22.2 (72.0)	26.9 (80.4)	29.2 (84.6)	34.1 (93.4)	33.4 (92.1)	28.7 (83.7)	23.7 (74.7)	17.9 (64.2)	11.6 (52.9)	22.0 (71.6)
Daily mean °C (°F)	4.9 (40.8)	7.0 (44.6)	11.1 (52.0)	16.9 (62.4)	21.9 (71.4)	24.9 (76.8)	29.3 (84.7)	28.7 (83.7)	24.3 (75.7)	19.1 (66.4)	13.3 (55.9)	7.3 (45.1)	17.4 (63.3)
Mean daily minimum °C (°F)	2.1 (35.8)	3.8 (38.8)	7.5 (45.5)	12.9 (55.2)	18.0 (64.4)	21.7 (71.1)	25.6 (78.1)	25.3 (77.5)	21.1 (70.0)	15.6 (60.1)	9.8 (49.6)	4.1 (39.4)	14.0 (57.1)
Record low °C (°F)	−15.0 (5.0)	−7.5 (18.5)	−2.4 (27.7)	0.3 (32.5)	8.2 (46.8)	12.7 (54.9)	17.9 (64.2)	18.7 (65.7)	10.7 (51.3)	2.8 (37.0)	−3.5 (25.7)	−13.2 (8.2)	−15.0 (5.0)
Average precipitation mm (inches)	96.4 (3.80)	91.9 (3.62)	136.2 (5.36)	115.3 (4.54)	129.7 (5.11)	255.4 (10.06)	173.7 (6.84)	175.7 (6.92)	119.7 (4.71)	74.4 (2.93)	79.6 (3.13)	67.6 (2.66)	1,515.6 (59.68)
Average precipitation days (≥ 0.1 mm)	13.1	12.3	15.3	14.1	13.6	16.1	12.5	13.9	11.6	8.4	10.7	10.2	151.8
Average snowy days	3.4	2.2	0.6	0	0	0	0	0	0	0	0.1	1.3	7.6
Average relative humidity (%)	76	75	74	72	73	80	74	76	79	76	77	74	76
Mean monthly sunshine hours	105.9	106.9	128.6	151.7	162.7	128.9	214.1	201.9	154.8	154.8	126.1	124.9	1,761.3
Percentage possible sunshine	33	34	34	39	38	31	50	50	42	44	40	40	40
Source: China Meteorological Administration

== Geography ==
Xiaoshan District is in the north of Zhejiang Province, between latitude 29°50'48"-30°23'33 "N and longitude 120°04'21"-120°43'31 "E. The area is about 63.05 kilometers from east to west and 60.5 kilometers from north to south. It is about 63.05 kilometers wide from east to west and 60.5 kilometers long from north to south, with a total area of 1,417.834 square kilometers.

Topography and geomorphology

Xiaoshan District is in the northern part of the low hills in eastern Zhejiang and the southern part of the plains in northern Zhejiang. The terrain is high in the south and low in the north, tilting from southwest to northeast and slightly low-lying in the center. The geomorphological zoning features are more obvious: the southern part is a low mountainous area with small river valley plains; the central and northern parts are plains, with hills in the middle. The plains account for about 66% of the region, the mountains for 17%, and the water for 17%.

Climate

Xiaoshan District is located on the southern edge of the northern subtropical monsoon climate zone; the climate is characterized by long winter and summer, short spring and autumn, and four distinct seasons: abundant light, abundant rainfall, warm and humid; cold air is easy to enter and difficult to get out of the more disastrous weather; light, temperature, and water of the regional differences are apparent.

== Industry ==
=== Xiaoshan Economic & Technological Development Zone ===
Xiaoshan Economic & Technological Development Zone was established in 1990. The zone is only 10 km (6.2 mi) away from Hangzhou Xiaoshan International Airport, with Shanghai-Ningbo Expressway and Hangzhou-Qujiang Expressway passing through. Currently, it has formed leading industries including electronic communications, automobiles and auto parts, precision machinery, medical food, textiles, garments, chemical building materials.

== Economy ==
Loong Airlines has its headquarters in the Loong Air Office Building (Chinese: 长龙航空办公大楼; pinyin: Chánglóng Hángkōng Bàngōngdàlóu) on the property of Hangzhou Xiaoshan International Airport.
