= Jiangdong'er Road station =

Metro station in Xiaoshan, Hangzhou

Jiangdong'er Road 江东二路
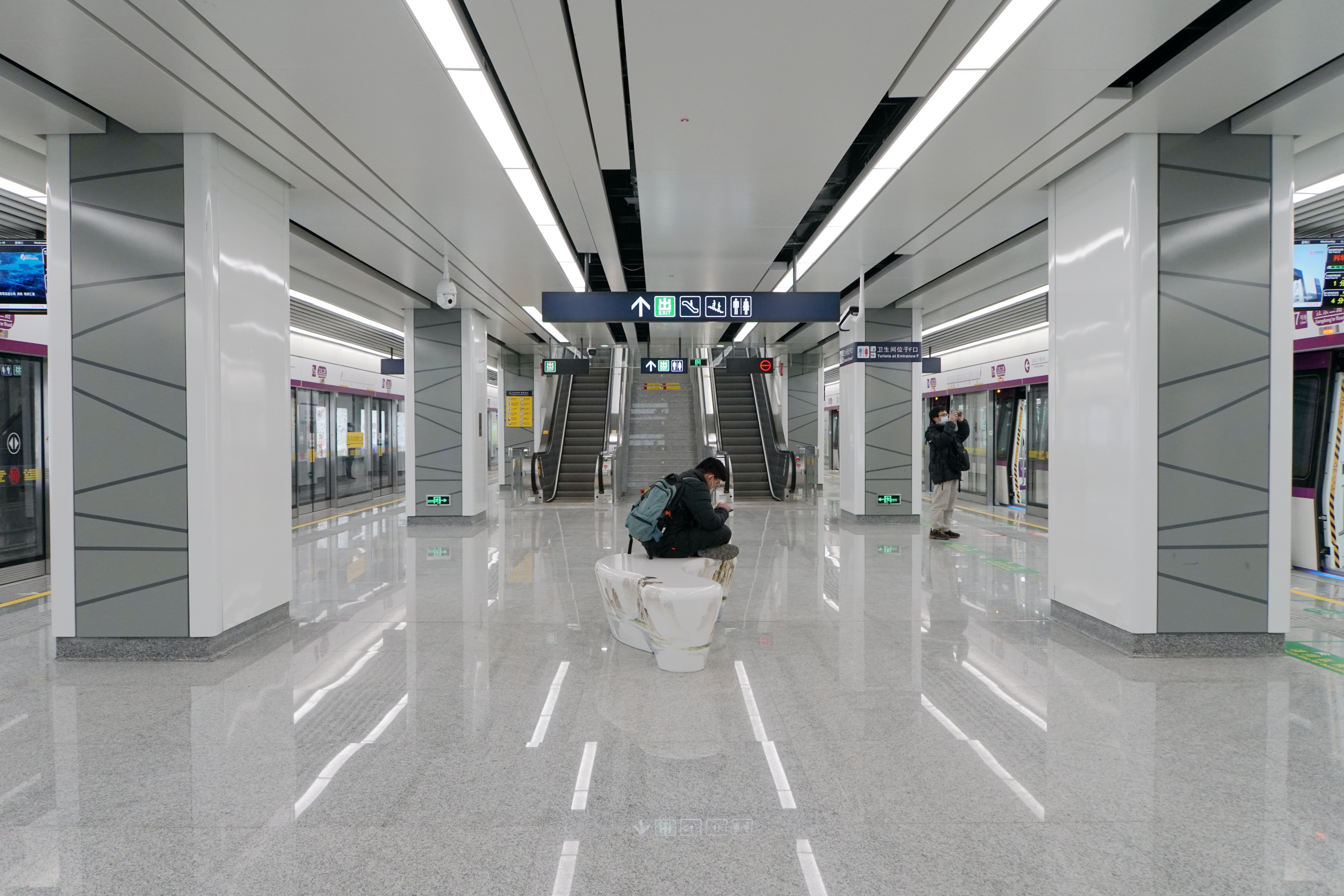
- Platform

General information
- Location: Qingliu Rd.(N) × Jiangdong 2 Rd. Qiantang District, Hangzhou, Zhejiang; China
- Coordinates: 30.3258°N 120.4904°E
- Operator: Hangzhou Metro Corporation
- Line: Line 7
- Platforms: 2 (1 island platform)

Other information
- Station code: JDE

History
- Opened: 30 December 2020

Services
Preceding station	Hangzhou Metro	Following station
Qicheng Road towards Wushan Square	Line 7	Terminus
Location

Jiangdong'er Road (Chinese: 江东二路) is the eastern terminus of Line 7 of the Hangzhou Metro in China. It was opened on 30 December 2020, together with Line 7. It is located in the Qiantang District of Hangzhou.
