= Line 12 (Hangzhou Metro) =

Under construction metro line in Hangzhou, Zhejiang

Overview
- Status: Under construction
- Owner: Hangzhou Metro
- Locale: Hangzhou, Zhejiang, China
- Termini: West Railway Station; Xiangshan Campus, China Academy of Art Zhijiang Science & Innovation City (Future)
- Stations: 15 (Phase 1); 19 (Total)

Service
- Type: Rapid transit
- System: Hangzhou Metro
- Operator: Hangzhou Metro
- Depot: Shuangpu Depot

Technical
- Line length: 26.05 km (16.19 mi) (Phase 1), including: ● 24.3 km (15.1 mi) (Northern section) ● 1.7 km (1.1 mi) (Southern section)
- Number of tracks: 2
- Track gauge: 1,435 mm (4 ft 8 1/2 in)
- Electrification: 1.5 kV DC Overhead catenary contact
- Operating speed: 100 km/h (62 mph) (Maximum design speed)

Line 12 of the Hangzhou Metro (Chinese: 杭州地铁12号线; pinyin: Hángzhōu dìtiě shíèr hào xiàn) is an under construction metro line in Hangzhou, Zhejiang, China. This is the only metro line of Hangzhou Metro that runs north-south in the western part of Hangzhou. The entire line will be fully connected by February 2027 and is expected to open by the end of 2027.

The total investment of Line 12 is 21.082 billion RMB with a construction period of 5 years.

Line 12 will be the first metro line of Hangzhou Metro system using GoA4 automation level.

== History ==
On 21 August 2018, the planned route for Line 12 was established.

On 17 April 2026, the first rolling stock set of Line 12 was produced by CRRC Hangzhou (a subsidiary of CRRC Nanjing Puzhen) was rolling off.

On 9 May 2026, the first rolling stock set of Line 12 arrived at Shuangpu Depot.

== Stations ==
All 15 stations of Phase 1 are fully underground with an average station distance of 1.7 km (1.1 mi). In future planning, the stations from Shuangpu to Xiaming Street will split off from Line 6 and merge to Line 12.

Station name		Transfer	Distance km	Location
English	Chinese	Transfer	Distance km	Location
West Railway Station	火车西站	3 19		Yuhang
Zhanbei Road	站北路			Yuhang
Cangqian Campus Hangzhou Normal University	杭师大仓前	5		Yuhang
Haichuangyuan	海创园	19		Yuhang
Wuchangshidi	五常湿地			Yuhang
Hemuqiao	何母桥			Yuhang
Gaojiao Road	高教路	3		Yuhang
Huangniwu	黄泥坞			Yuhang
Xiaoheshan	小和山	3		Xihu
Bailongtan	白龙潭			Xihu
Tea Expo Exhibition Center	茶博会展中心			Xihu
Longwu	龙坞			Xihu
Miaoshan	庙山			Xihu
Lijing Road	丽景路			Xihu
Xiangshan Campus, China Academy of Art	美院象山	6		Xihu
Xiaming Street	霞鸣街			Xihu
Kehai Road	科海路			Xihu
Shuangpu	双浦			Xihu
Zhijiang Science & Innovation City	之江科创城			Xihu

== Rolling stock ==
The Line 12 uses higher capacity six car Class AH trains which are 20 cm wider than the Class B trains used in other Hangzhou Metro lines. In the phase 1, 29 sets of rolling stock with GoA4 automation level was produced to meet the demands.
