= Jianye Road station =

Metro station in Hangzhou, China

Jianye Road 建业路
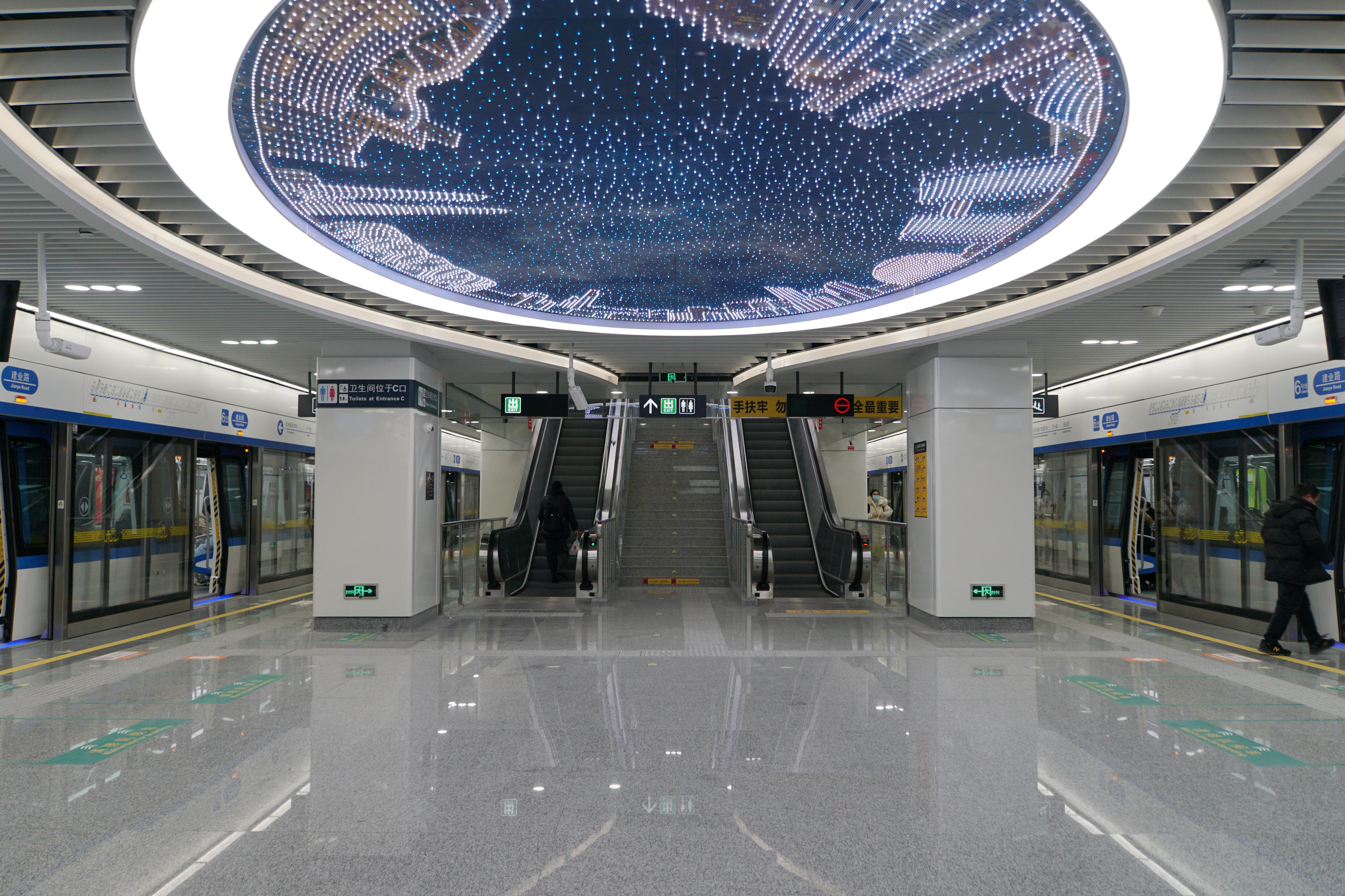
- Platform

General information
- Location: Jiangnan Avenue × Jianye Road; Binjiang District, Hangzhou, Zhejiang; China
- Coordinates: 30.1935°N 120.1758°E
- Operator: Hangzhou Metro Corporation
- Line: Line 6
- Platforms: 2 (1 island platform)

Other information
- Station code: JYL

History
- Opened: 30 December 2020

Services
| Preceding station | Hangzhou Metro | Following station |
|---|---|---|
| Chengye Road towards West Guihua Road or Shuangpu | Line 6 | Changhe towards Goujulong |
Location

Jianye Road (simplified Chinese: 建业路; traditional Chinese: 建業路) is a metro station on Line 6 of the Hangzhou Metro in China. It was opened on 30 December 2020, together with the Line 6. It is located in the Binjiang District of Hangzhou, the capital city of Zhejiang province.

== Entrances/exits ==
- A: south side of Jiangnan Avenue, east side of Jianye Road
- B: north side of Jiangnan Avenue, east side of Jianye Road
- C: north side of Jiangnan Avenue, west side of Jianye Road
- D_{1}: north side of Jiangnan Avenue, Erkang Road, Pingle Street
- D_{2}: south side of Jiangnan Avenue, Nanchuan Road
- D_{3}: north side of Jiangnan Avenue, west side of Erkang Road
- D_{4}: south side of Jiangnan Avenue, Nanchuan Road
- E: south side of Jiangnan Avenue, west side of Jianye Road

== Gallery ==
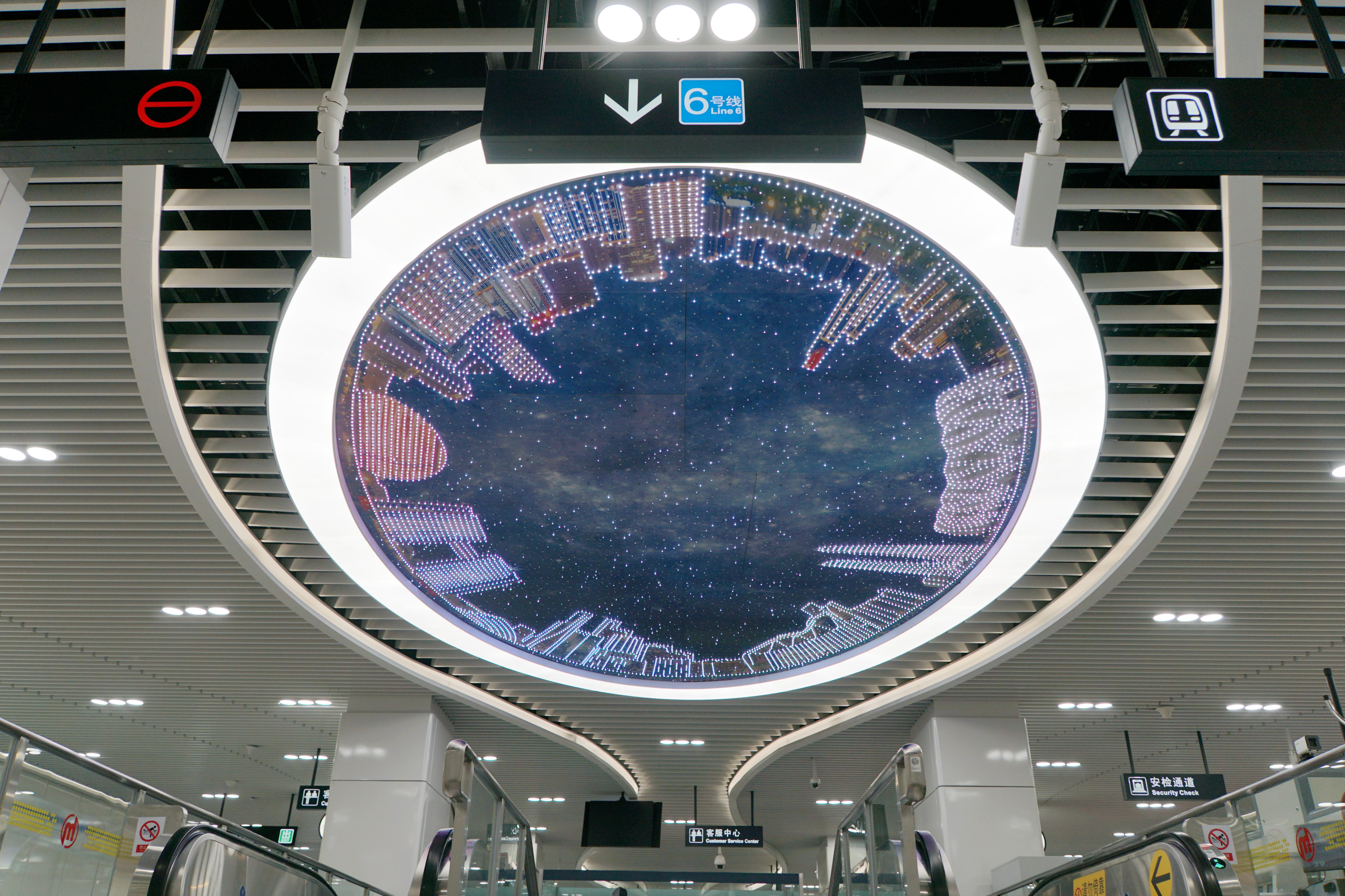
Ceiling

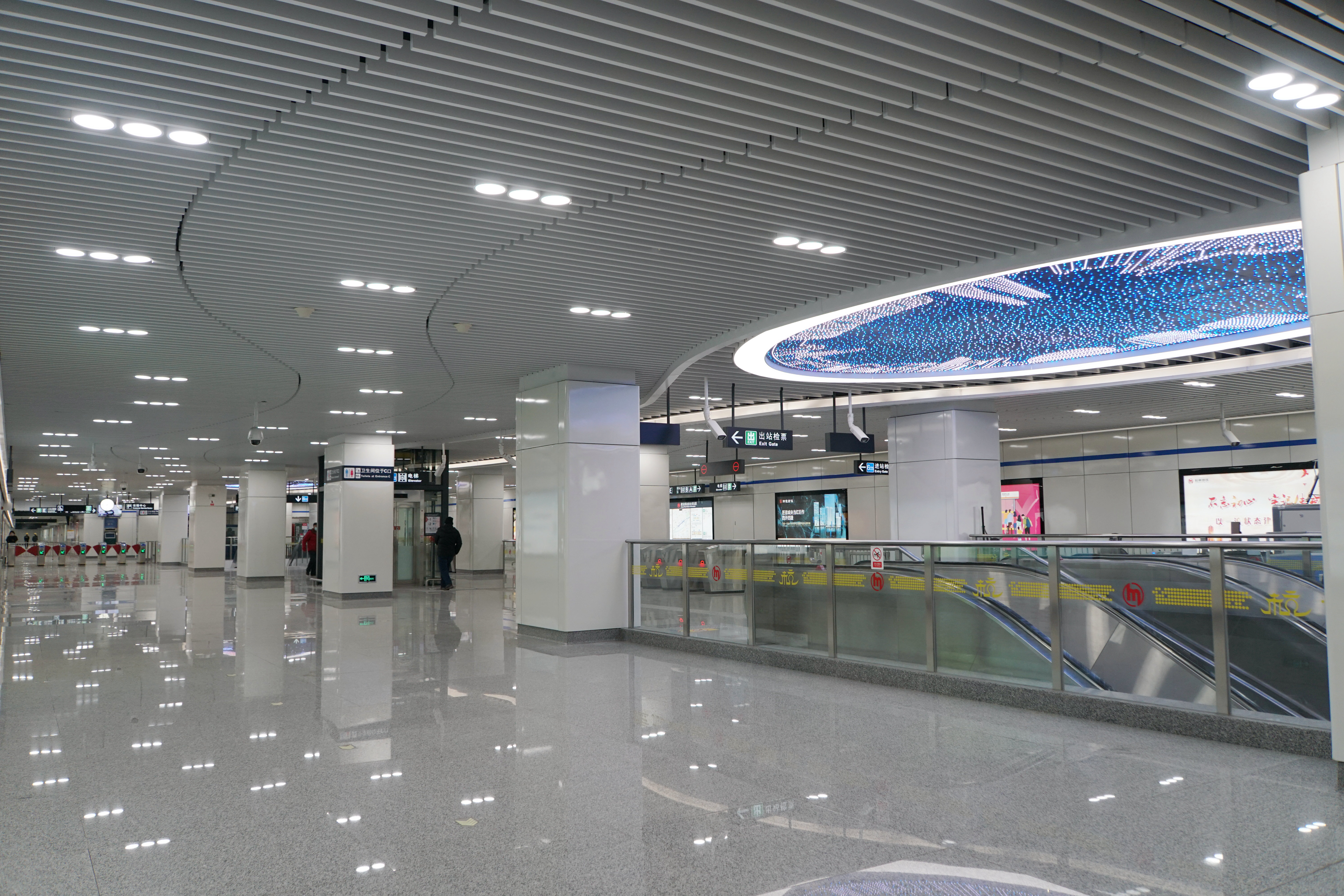
Concourse

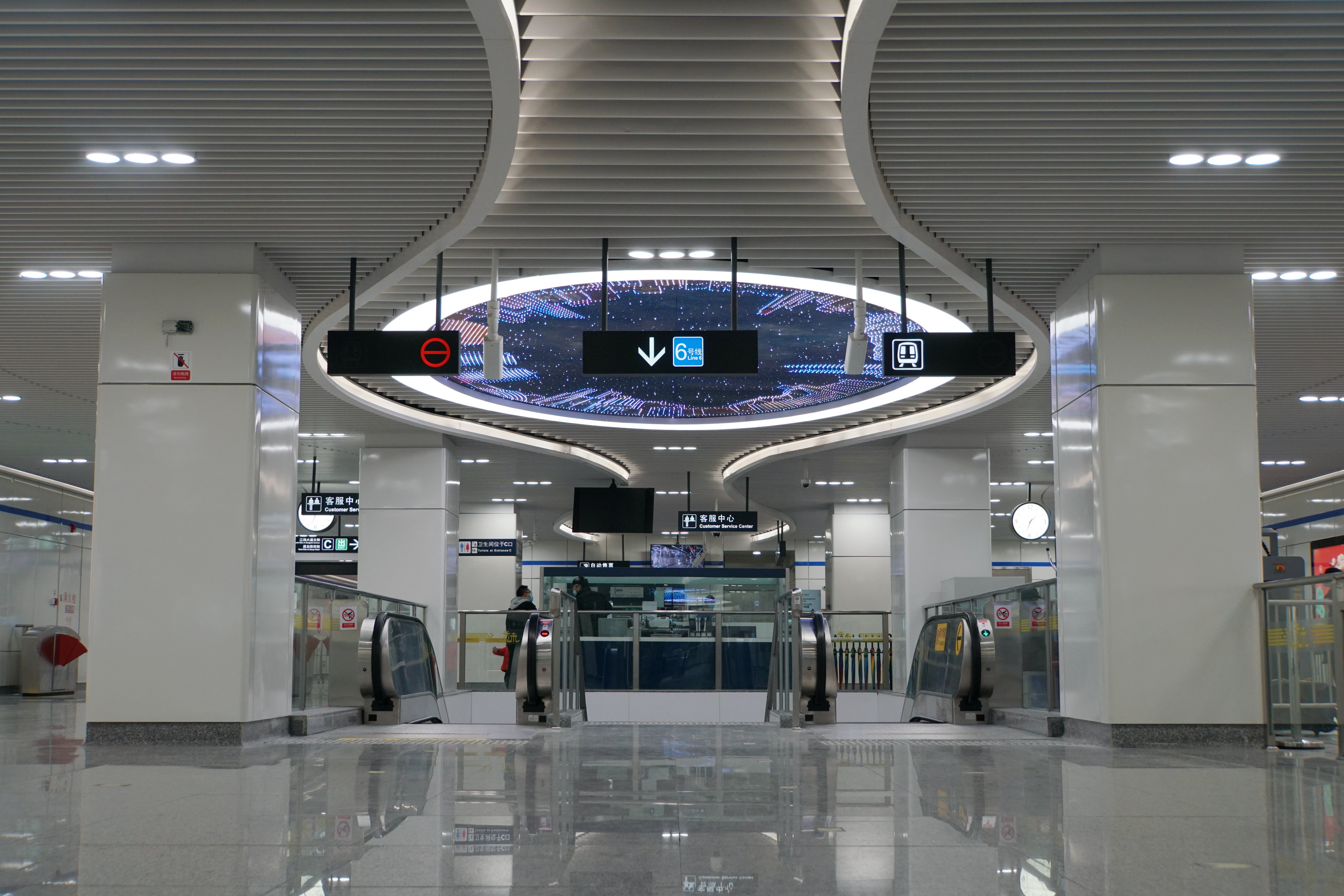
Another view of concourse

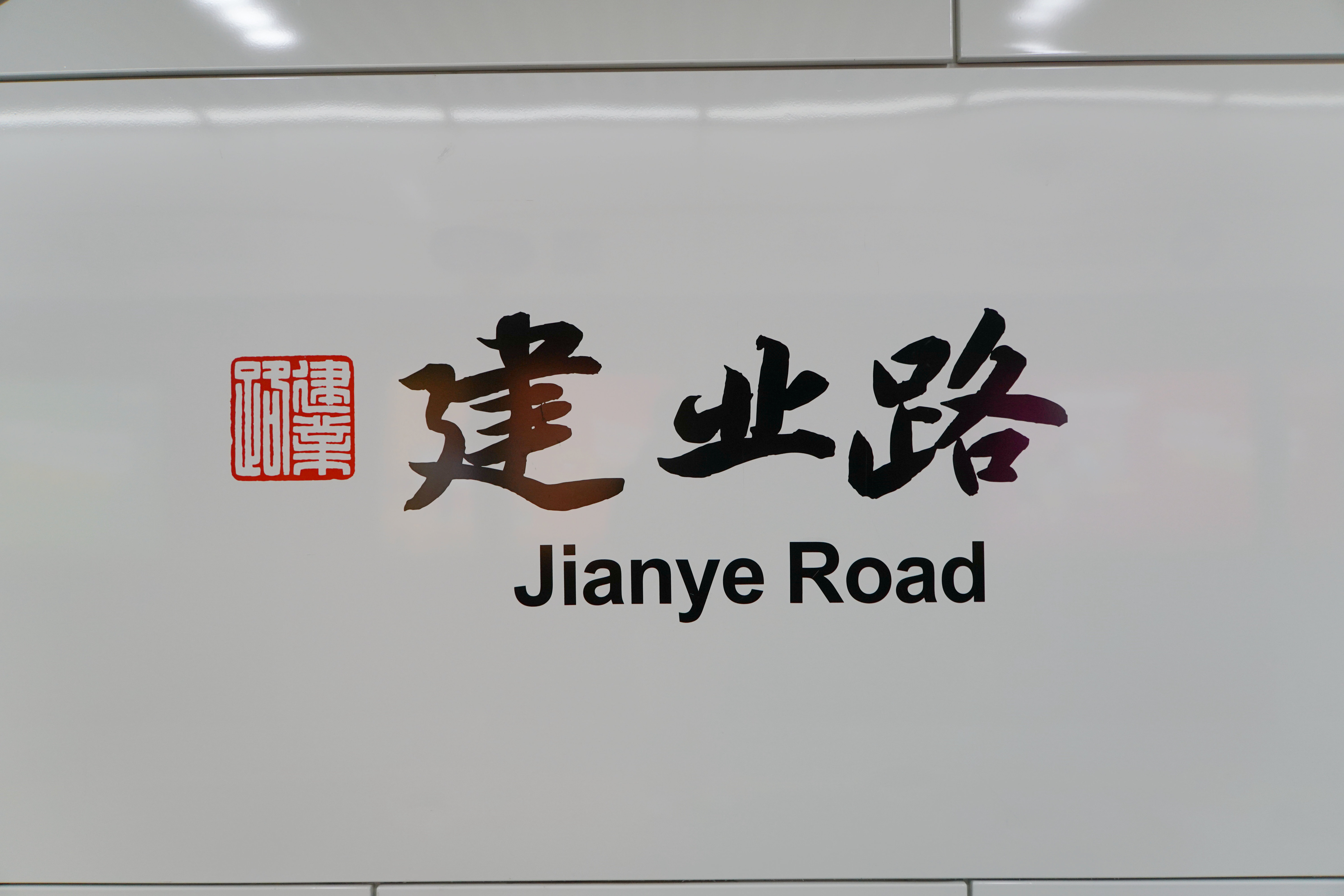
Station name in traditional Chinese calligraphy
