= XMJ =

XMJ or xmj may refer to:

- Majera language (ISO 639-3: xmj), a minor Afro-Asiatic language of Chad and Cameroon
- Xiaming Street station (Station code: XMJ), a train station in Xihu district, Hangzhou, Zhejiang province, China
