= Yongfu station =

Metro station in Hangzhou, China

Yongfu 永福
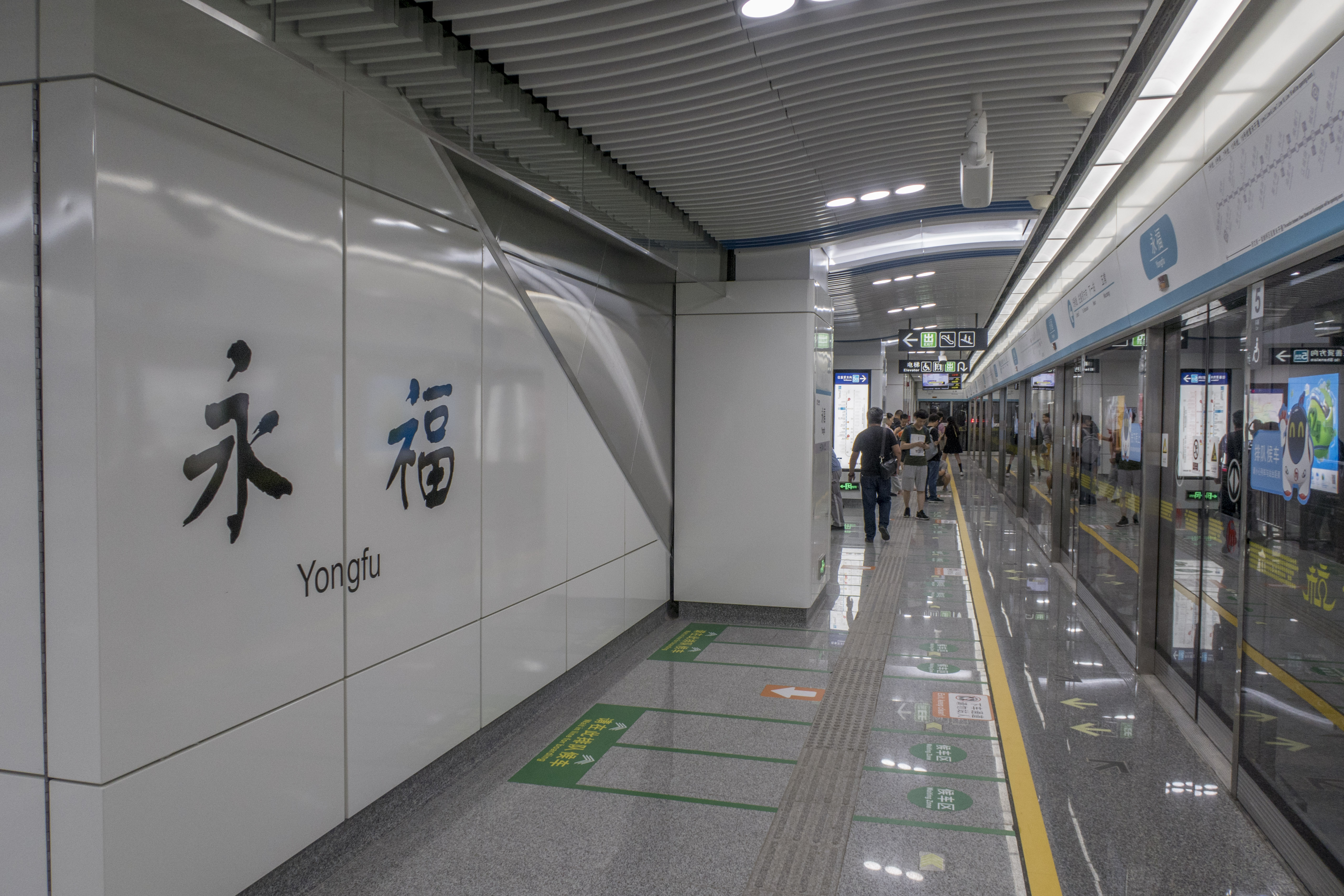

General information
- Location: Yuhangtang Road × Jucheng Road; Yuhang District, Hangzhou, Zhejiang; China
- Coordinates: 30°17′37″N 120°01′18″E
- System: Hangzhou metro station
- Operator: Hangzhou MTR Line 5 Corporation
- Line: Line 5
- Platforms: 2 (1 island platform)

Construction
- Structure type: Underground
- Accessible: Yes

History
- Opened: June 24, 2019

Services
Preceding station	Hangzhou Metro	Following station
Cangqian Campus, Hangzhou Normal University towards East Nanhu	Line 5	Wuchang towards Guniangqiao
Location

Yongfu (Chinese: 永福) is a metro station on Line 5 of the Hangzhou Metro in China. It is located in the Yuhang District of Hangzhou.

== Station layout ==
Yongfu has two levels: a concourse, and an island platform with two tracks for line 5.

== Entrances/exits ==
- A: Future Park
- B: Cangqian Campus, Hangzhou Normal University
- C: Dreams Starry
- D: south side of Yuhangtang Road, Jucheng Road
- E: south side of Yuhangtang Road
- F: south side of Yuhangtang Road, Songfeng Alley

== Gallery ==
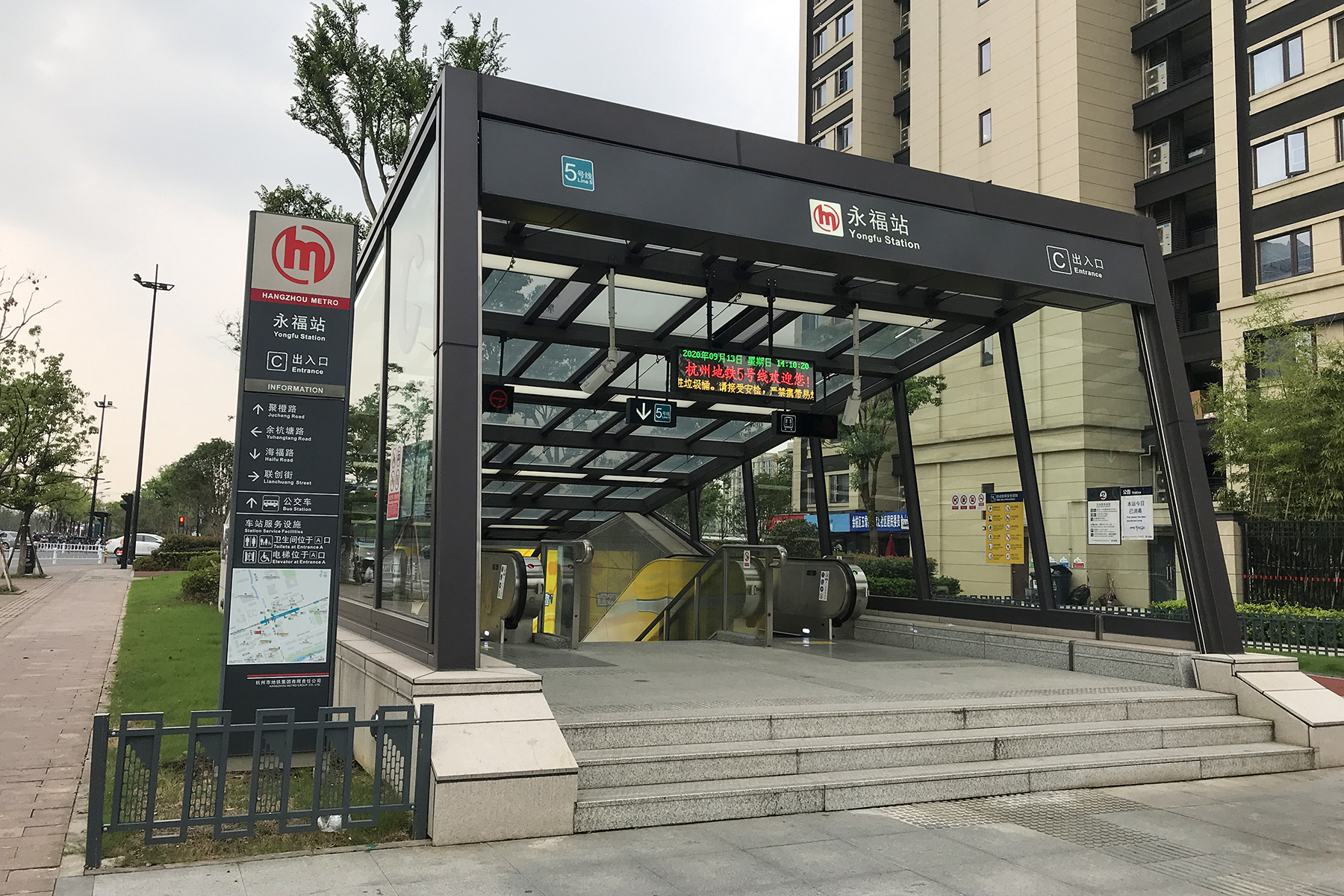
Entrance C

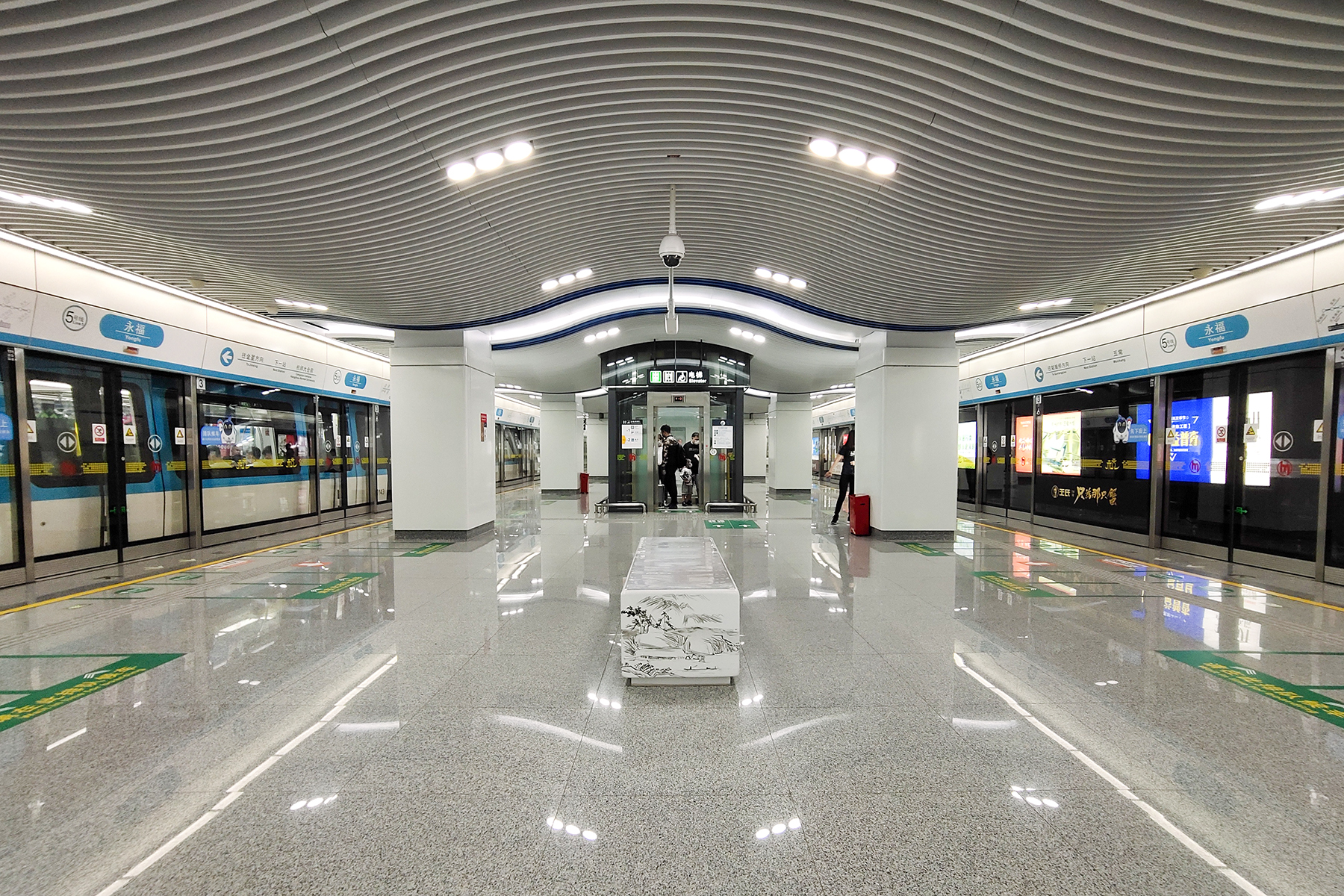
Platform
