= Zhejiang Conservatory of Music station =

Metro station in China

Zhejiang Conservatory of Music 音乐学院
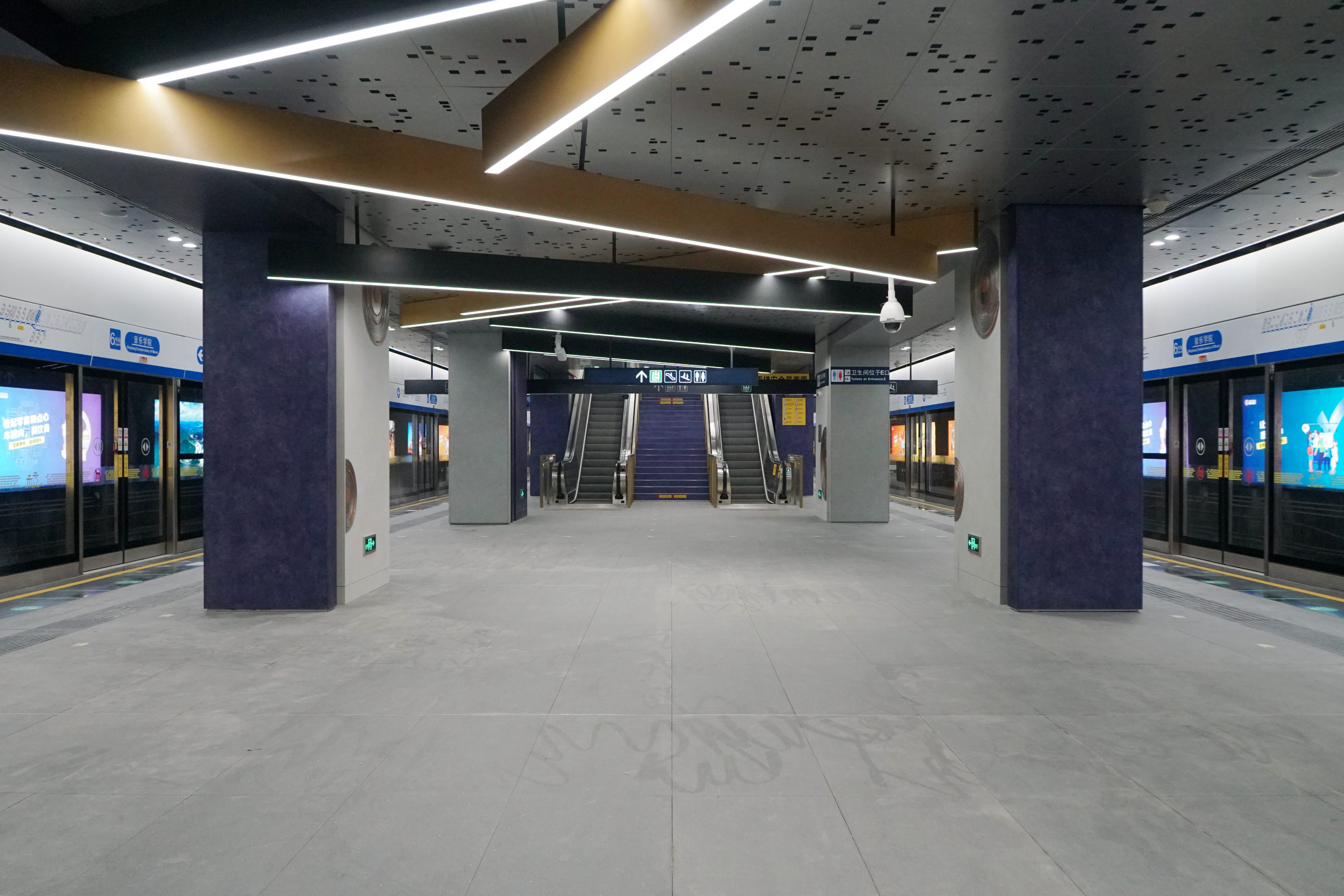
- Platforms

General information
- Location: Xinhaixian × Zhiyin Road; Xihu District, Hangzhou, Zhejiang; China
- Coordinates: 30°09′00″N 120°03′13″E
- System: Hangzhou metro station
- Operator: Hangzhou Metro Corporation
- Line: Line 6
- Platforms: 2 (1 island platform)

Construction
- Structure type: Underground
- Accessible: Yes

History
- Opened: December 30, 2020

Services
Preceding station	Hangzhou Metro	Following station
Zhongcun towards West Guihua Road	Line 6	Xiangshan Campus, China Academy of Art towards Goujulong
Location

Zhejiang Conservatory of Music (simplified Chinese: 音乐学院; traditional Chinese: 音樂學院) is a metro station on Fuyang section of Line 6 of the Hangzhou Metro in China. It was opened on 30 December 2020, together with Line 6. It is located in the Xihu District of Hangzhou.

== Station layout ==
Zhejiang Conservatory of Music station has two levels: a concourse, and an island platform with two tracks for line 6.

== Entrances/exits ==
- A: north side of Xinhaixian, Zhiyin Road
- B: Zhejiang Hangzhou No.7 High School
- C: Zhejiang Conservatory of Music
- D: south side of Xinhaixian, Zixiao Alley
- E: south side of Xinhaixian, Zhiyin Road

== Gallery ==
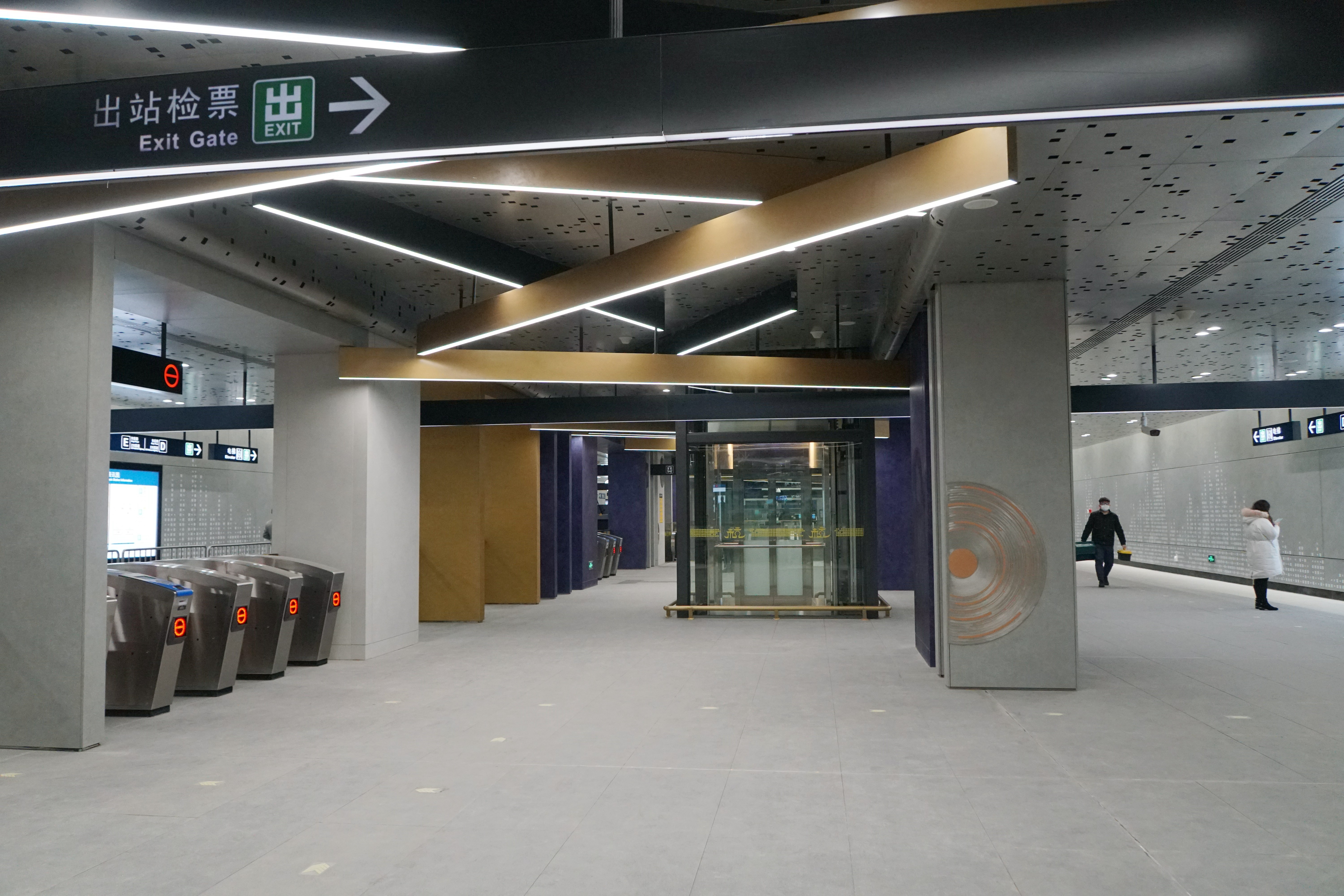
Concourse

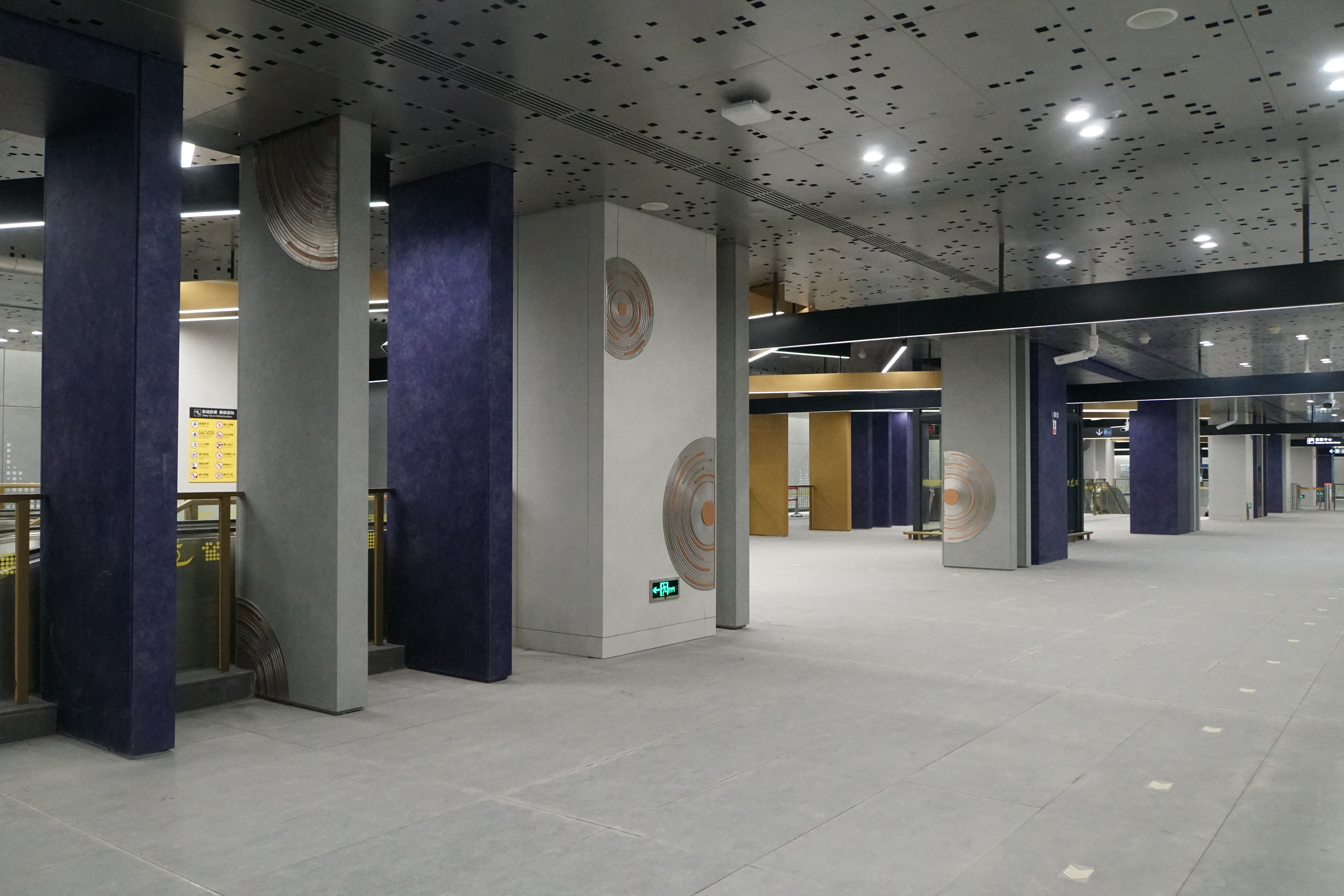
Concourse

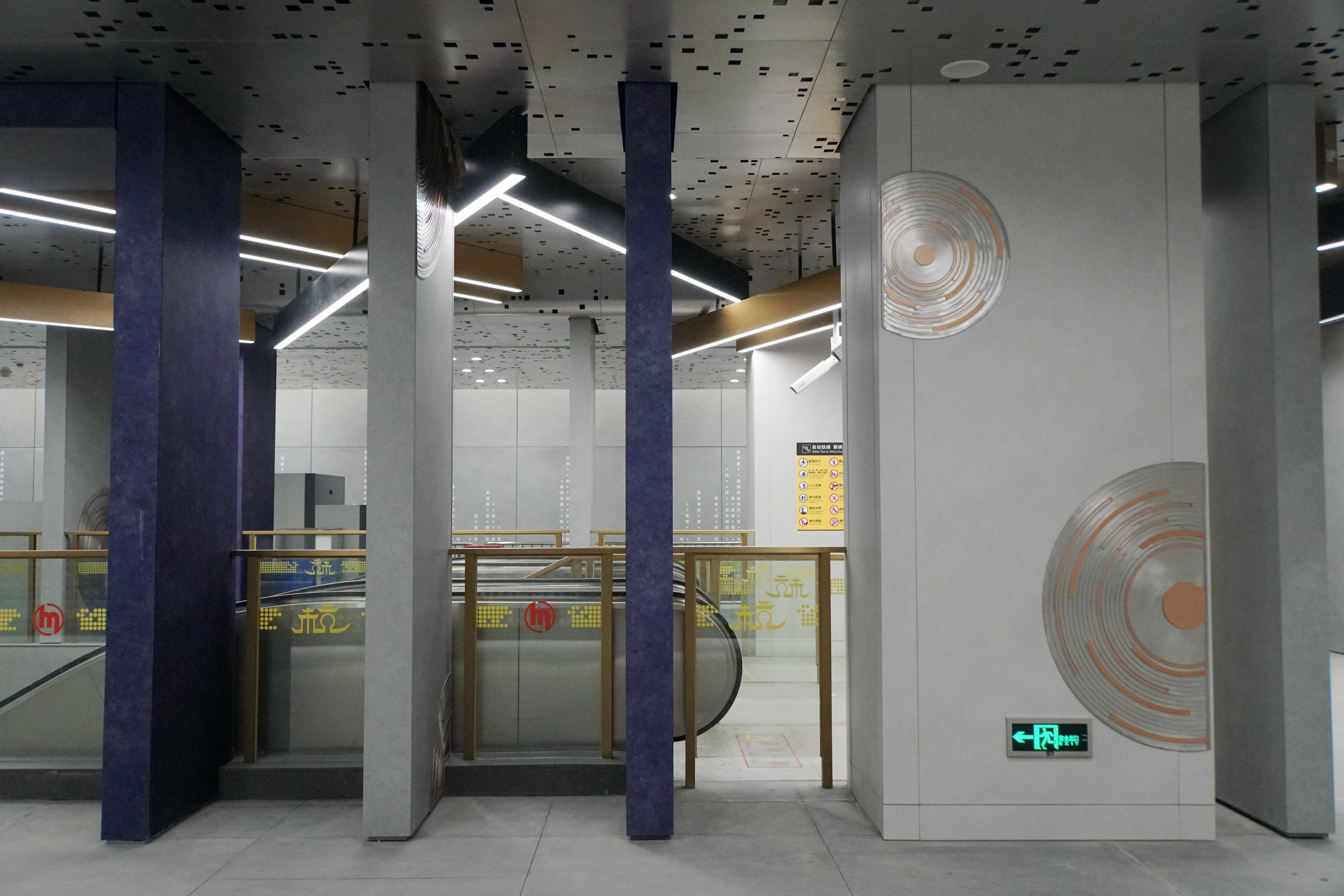
The decoration theme of the station is "The Beating Notes"

== See also ==
- Zhejiang Conservatory of Music
