= Wuchang station (Hangzhou Metro) =

Metro station in China

Wuchang 五常
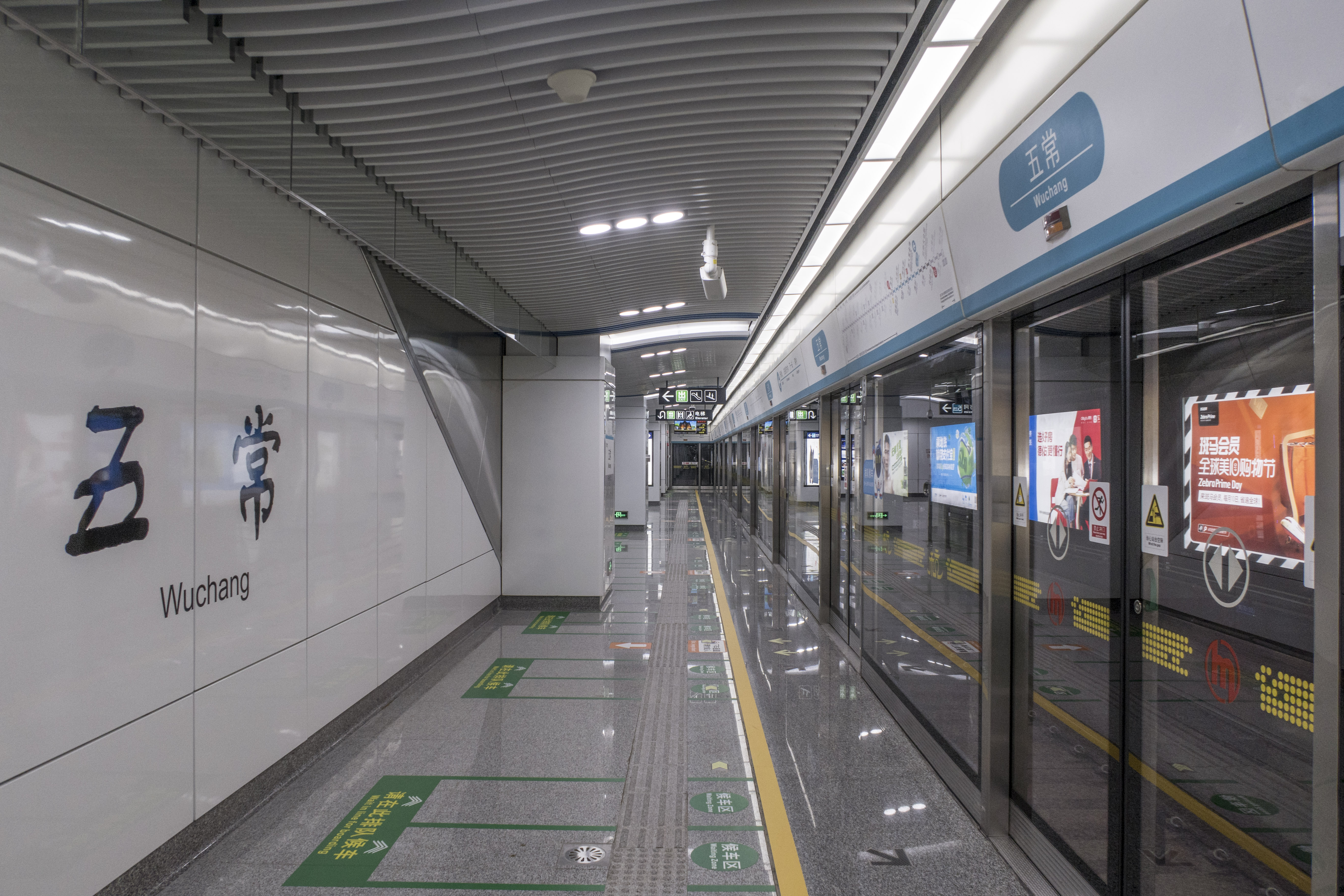
- Platforms

General information
- Location: Yuhangtang Road × Qiuqiao Road; Yuhang District, Hangzhou, Zhejiang; China
- Coordinates: 30°17′56″N 120°02′25″E
- System: Hangzhou metro station
- Operator: Hangzhou MTR Line 5 Corporation
- Line: Line 5
- Platforms: 2 (1 island platform)

Construction
- Structure type: Underground
- Accessible: Yes

History
- Opened: June 24, 2019

Services
Preceding station	Hangzhou Metro	Following station
Yongfu towards East Nanhu	Line 5	Jiangcun towards Guniangqiao
Location

Wuchang (Chinese: 五常) is a metro station on Line 5 of the Hangzhou Metro in China. It is located in the Yuhang District of Hangzhou.

== Station layout ==
Wuchang has two levels: a concourse, and an island platform with two tracks for line 5.

== Entrances/exits ==
- A: Future Center, Hangzhou MTR Headquarters
- B: south side of Yuhangtang Road, Qiuqiao Road
- C: south side of Yuhangtang Road, Xiaqi Alley
