= Liangmu Road station =

Metro station in Hangzhou, China

Liangmu Road 良睦路
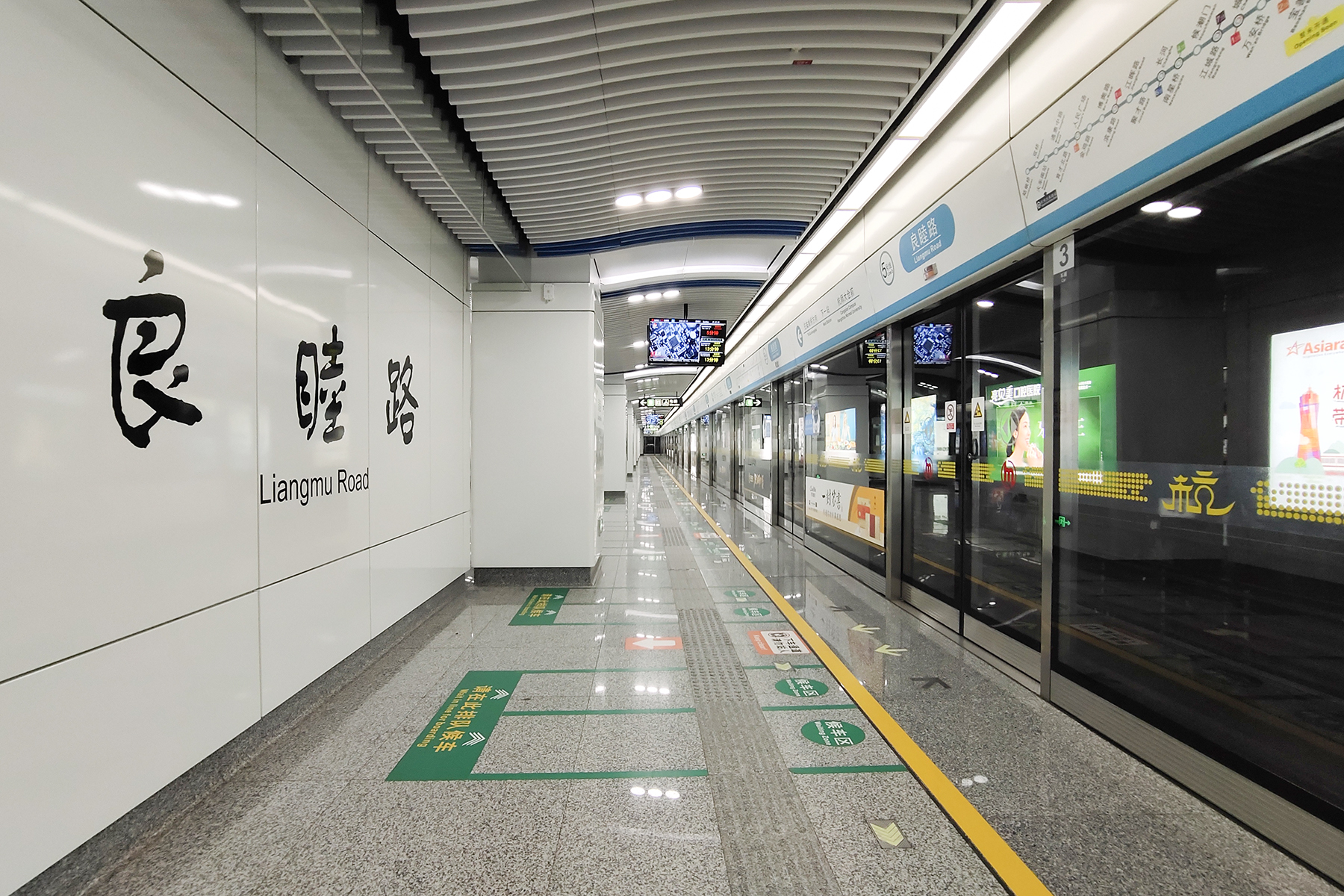
- Platform

General information
- Location: Yuhangtang Road × Liangmu Road; Yuhang District, Hangzhou, Zhejiang; China
- Coordinates: 30°17′17″N 120°00′10″E
- System: Hangzhou metro station
- Operator: Hangzhou MTR Line 5 Corporation
- Line: Line 5
- Platforms: 2 (1 island platform)

Construction
- Structure type: Underground
- Accessible: Yes

History
- Opened: June 24, 2019

Services
Preceding station	Hangzhou Metro	Following station
Chuangjing Road towards East Nanhu	Line 5	Cangqian Campus, Hangzhou Normal University towards Guniangqiao
Location

Liangmu Road (Chinese: 良睦路) is a metro station on Line 5 of the Hangzhou Metro in China. It is located in the Yuhang District of Hangzhou.

== Station layout ==
Liangmu Road has two levels: a concourse, and an island platform with two tracks for line 5.

== Entrances/exits ==
- A: Cangqian Campus, Hangzhou Normal University
- B: Dream Town
- C: Future Sci-tech City Conference Center
- D: south side of Yuhangtang Road

== Gallery ==
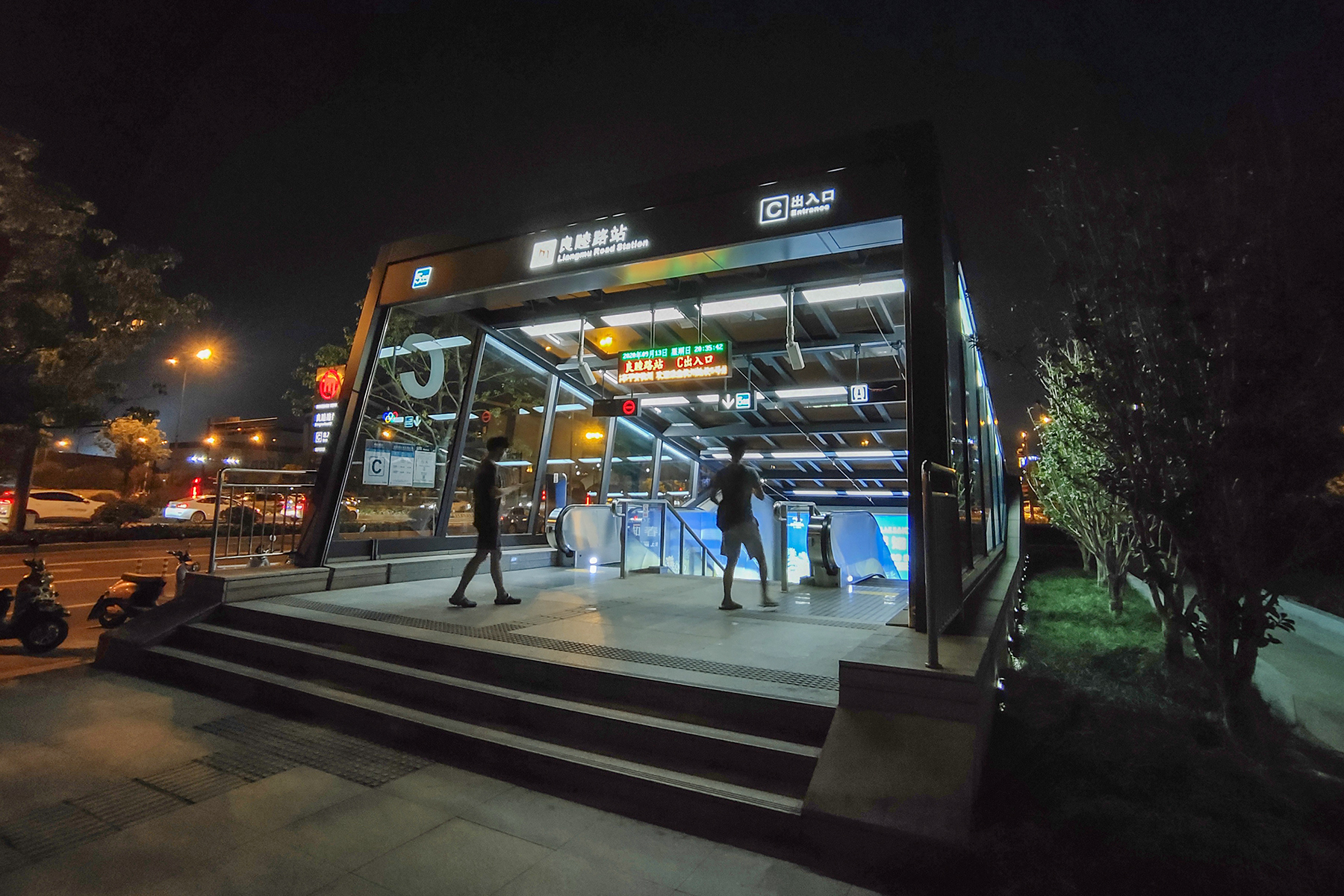
Entrance C

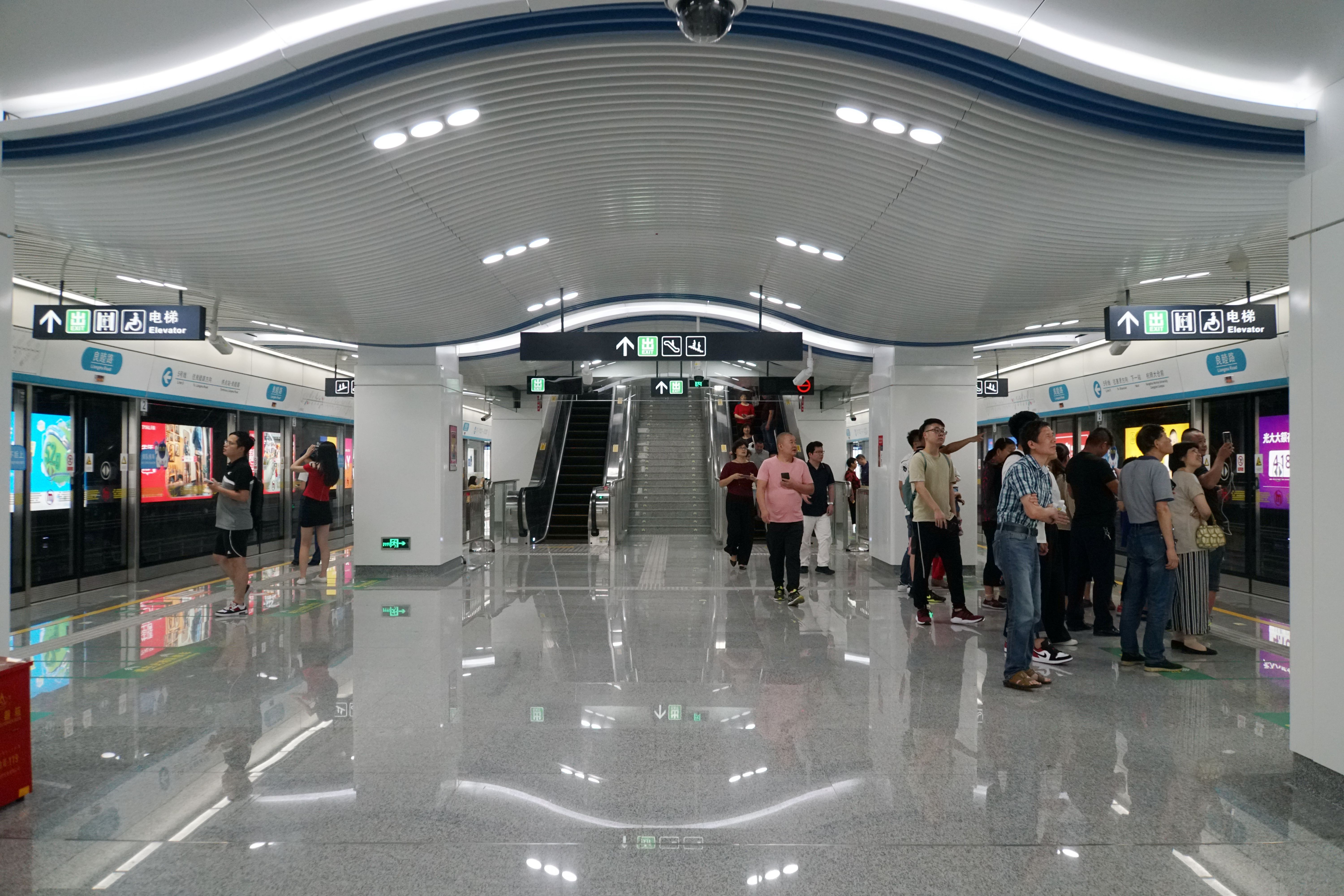
Platform
