= Jiangcun station =

Metro station in Hangzhou, China

Jiangcun 蒋村
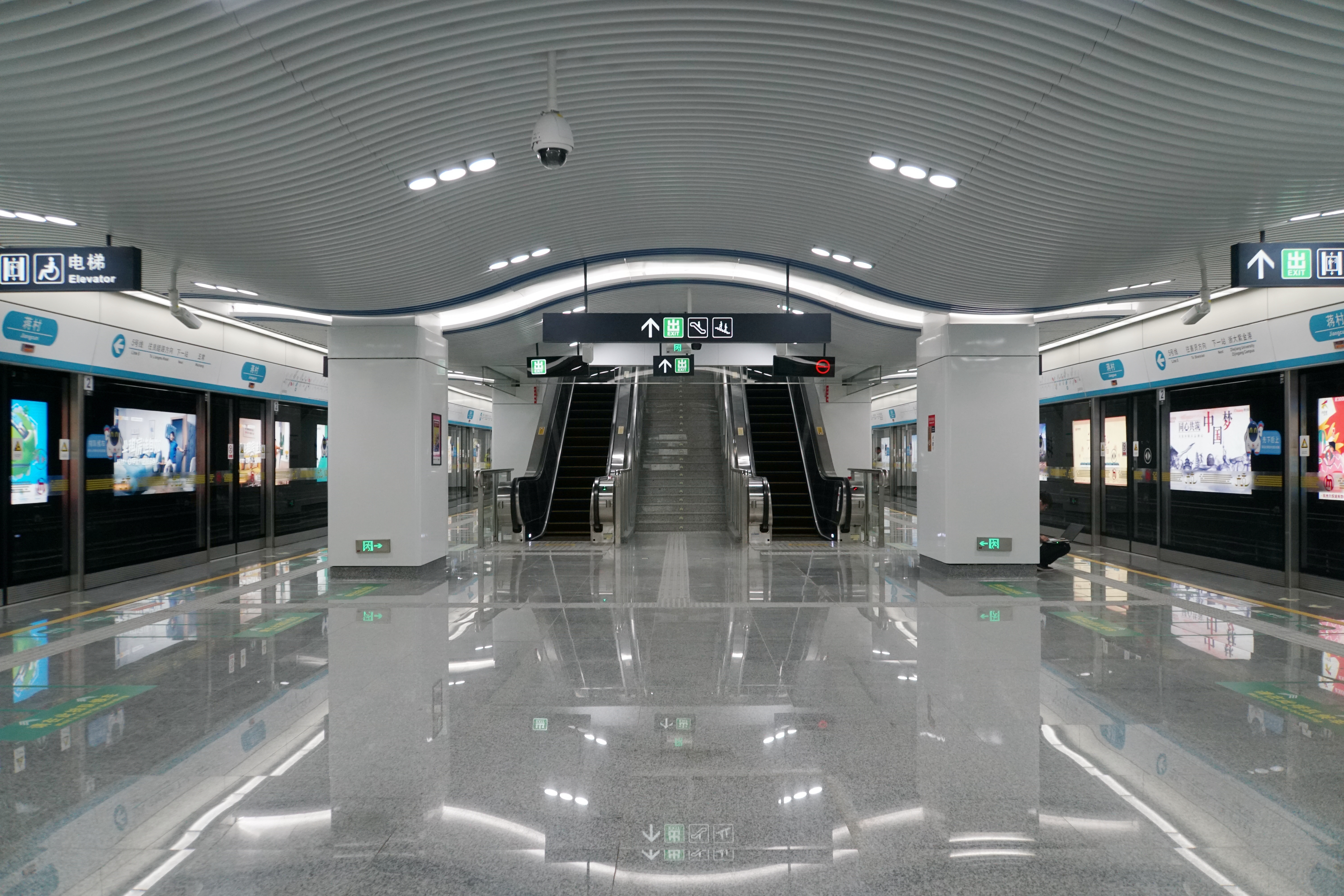
- Platforms

General information
- Location: Yuhangtang Road × Jiangdun Road; Xihu District, Hangzhou, Zhejiang; China
- Coordinates: 30°17′49″N 120°03′50″E
- System: Hangzhou metro station
- Operator: Hangzhou MTR Line 5 Corporation
- Line: Line 5
- Platforms: 2 (1 island platform)

Construction
- Structure type: Underground
- Accessible: Yes

History
- Opened: June 24, 2019

Services
Preceding station	Hangzhou Metro	Following station
Wuchang towards East Nanhu	Line 5	Zijingang Campus, Zhejiang University towards Guniangqiao
Location

Jiangcun (simplified Chinese: 蒋村; traditional Chinese: 蔣村) is a metro station on Line 5 of the Hangzhou Metro in China. It is located in the Xihu District of Hangzhou.

== Station layout ==
Jiangcun has two levels: a concourse, and an island platform with two tracks for line 5.

== Entrances/exits ==
- A2: north side of Yuhangtang Road, Jiangdun Road
- B: north side of Yuhangtang Road
- D: Xixi Paradise Walk
- E: Xixi Paradise Walk
