= FHX =

FHX or FHx can refer to:

- Family history (medicine), or the disorders carried by blood relatives of a patient
- West Fenghua Road station, a train station in Xihu district, Hangzhou, Zhejiang province, China
- FHX, a military squadron in the No. 7 Elementary Flying Training School RAF unit in the United Kingdom, by squadron code; see List of RAF squadron codes
- Fenghuang County, a county in Xiangxi Tujia and Miao Autonomous Prefecture, Hunan province, China; see List of administrative divisions of Hunan
