= Xiangshan Campus, China Academy of Art station =

Metro station in China

Coordinates: 30.1534°N 120.0764°E

Xiangshan Campus, China Academy of Art 美院象山
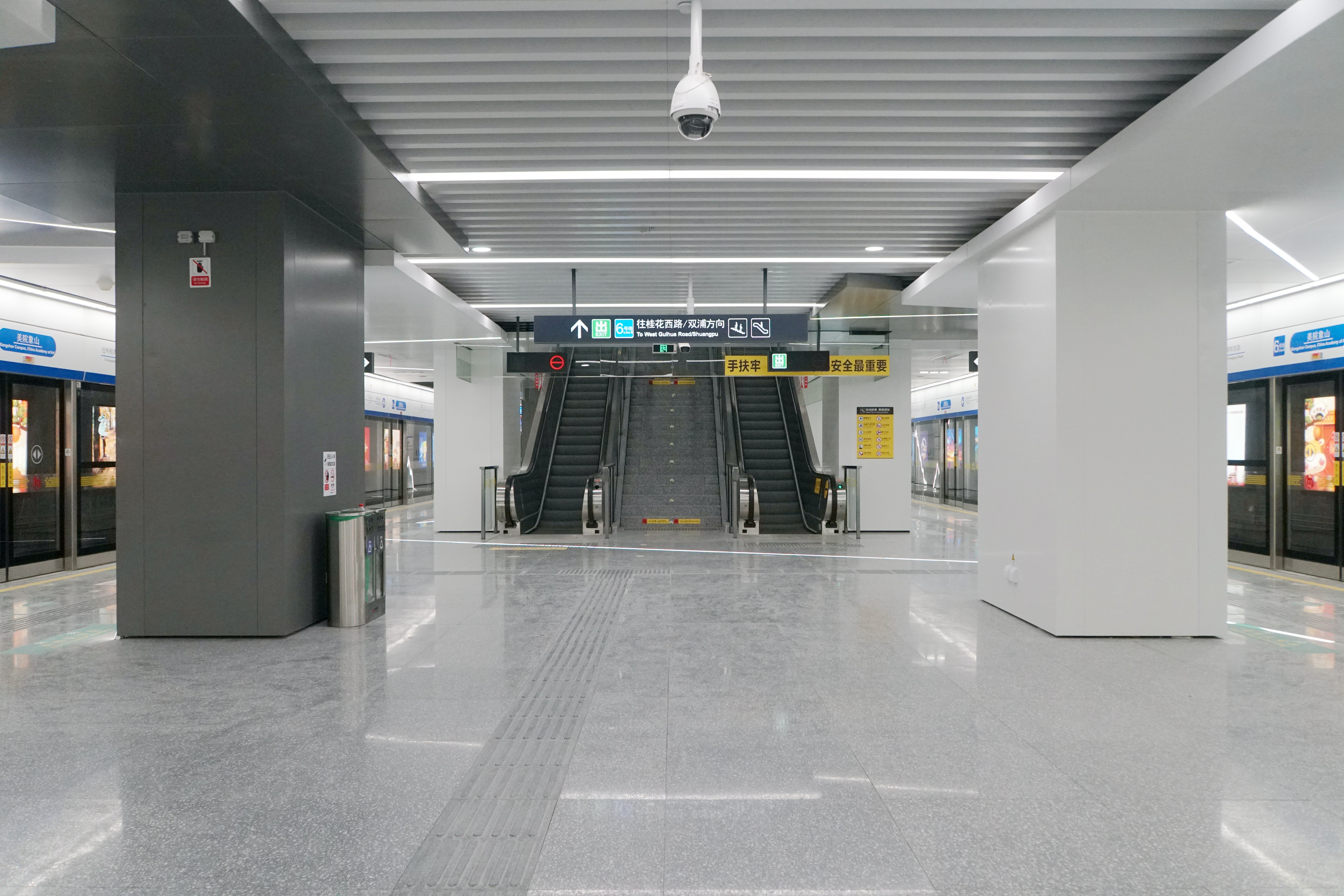

General information
- Location: Xihu District, Hangzhou, Zhejiang; China
- Operator: Hangzhou Metro Corporation
- Line: Line 6
- Platforms: 4 (2 island platform)

Other information
- Station code: MYX

History
- Opened: December 30, 2020

Services
Preceding station	Hangzhou Metro	Following station
Xiaming Street towards Shuangpu	Line 6	West Fenghua Road towards Goujulong
Zhejiang Conservatory of Music towards West Guihua Road	Line 6	West Fenghua Road towards Goujulong
Location

Xiangshan Campus, China Academy of Art (Chinese: 美院象山) station is a metro station on Line 6 of the Hangzhou Metro in China. It was opened on 30 December 2020 with Line 6. Here the train service of Line 6 will split into two directions. It is located in the Xihu District of Hangzhou, near the Xiangshan Campus of China Academy of Art, which is where it gets its name from.

== Station layout ==
1F	Ground	Exits
B1F	Concourse	Customer Service, Metro Ticketing, Security Check
B2F; Platforms		← Line 6 towards Shuangpu (Xiaming Street)
B2F; Platforms	Island platform, doors will open on the left
B2F; Platforms		← Line 6 towards West Guihua Road (Zhejiang Conservatory of Music)
B3F; Platforms		Line 6 towards Goujulong (West Fenghua Road) →
B3F; Platforms	Island platform, doors will open on the left
B3F; Platforms		Line 6 towards Goujulong (West Fenghua Road) →

== Gallery ==
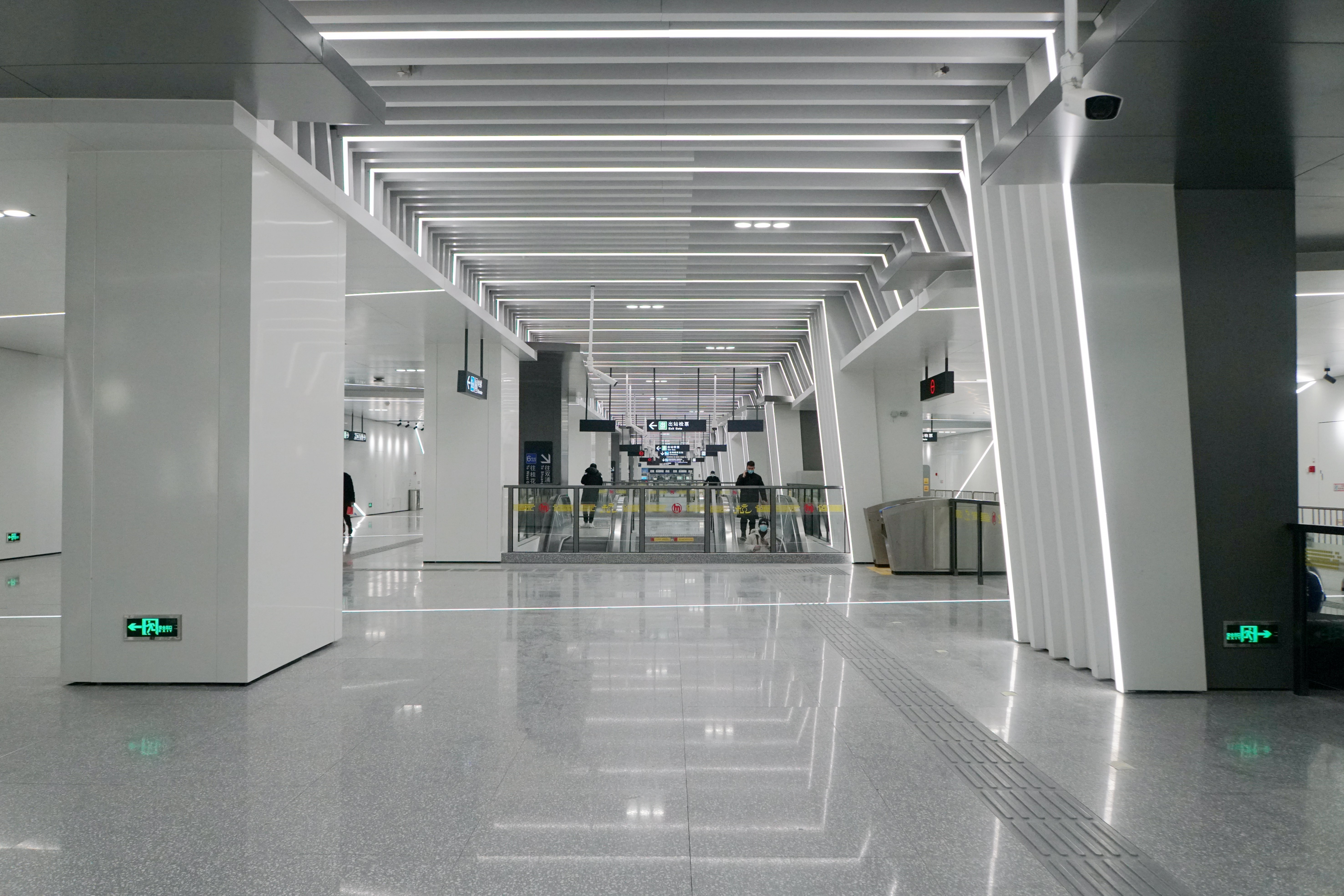

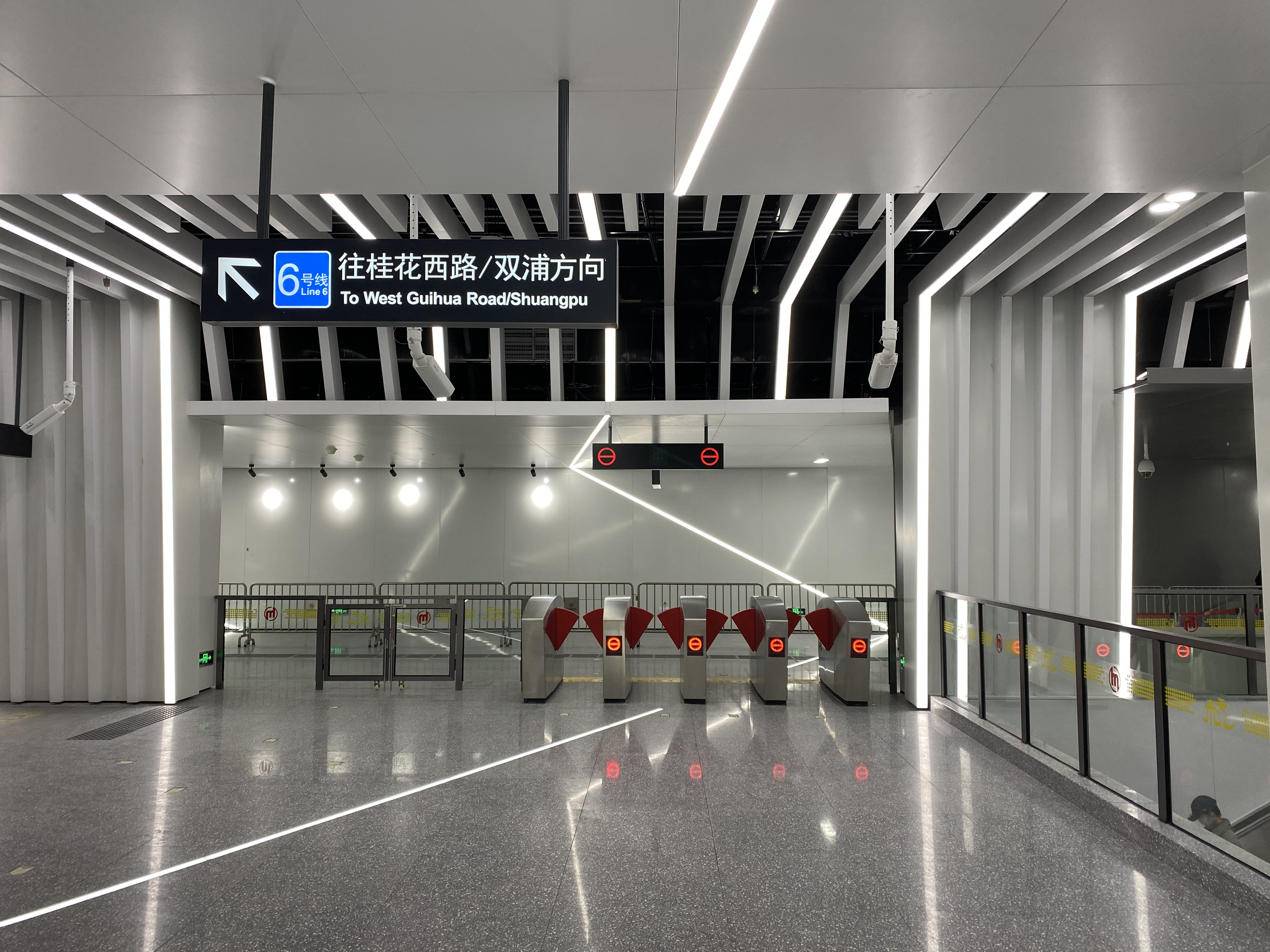

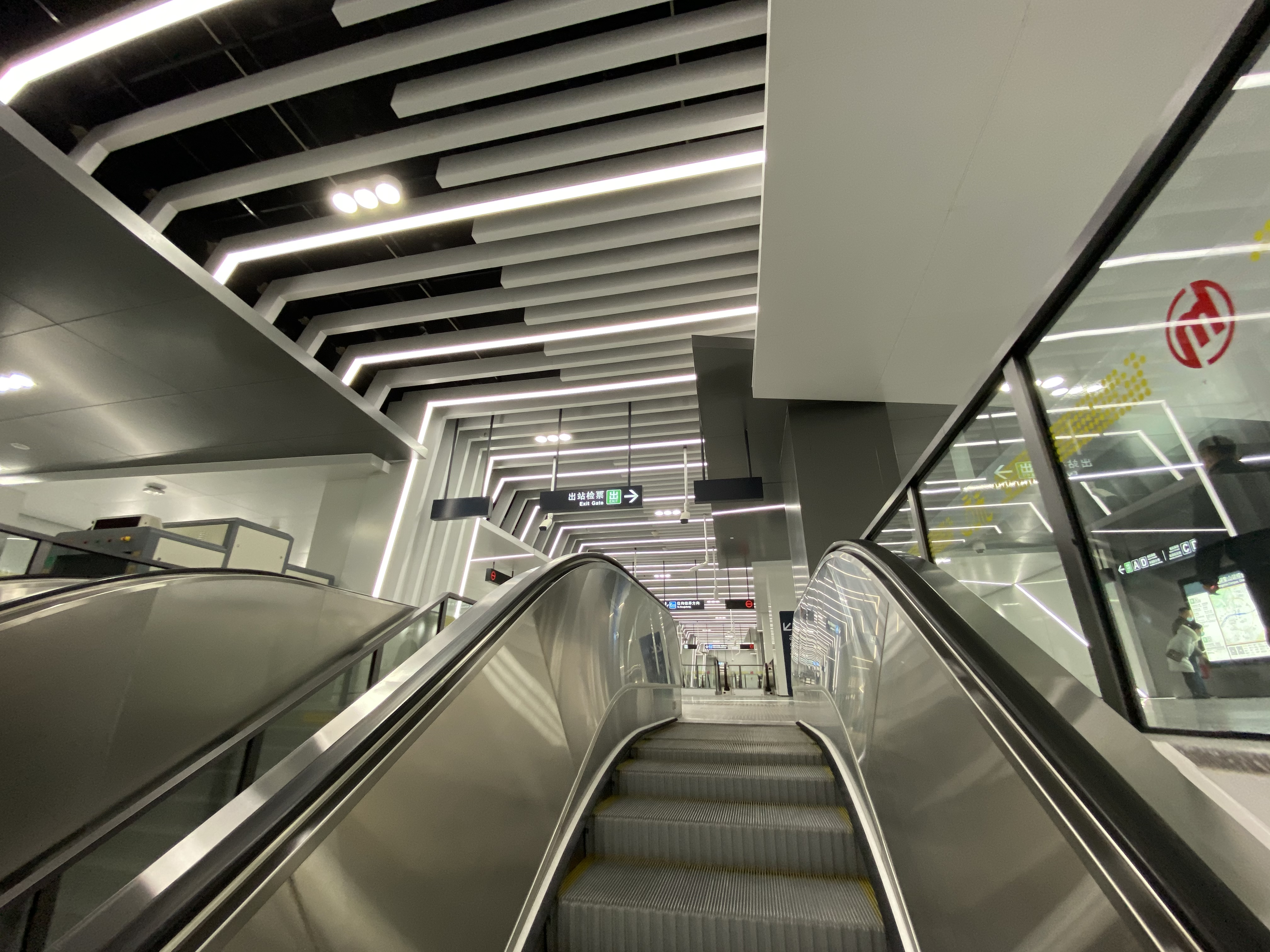

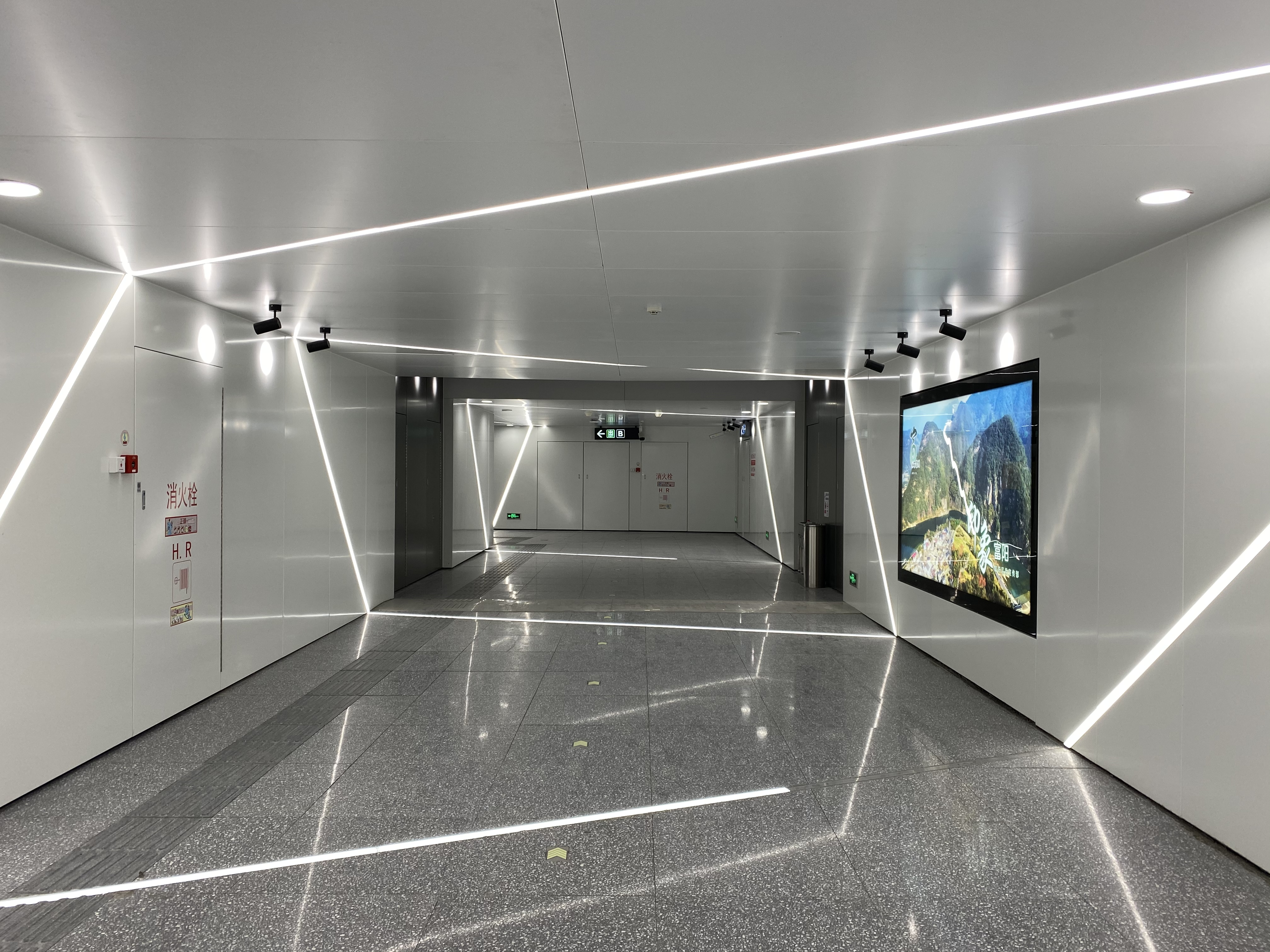

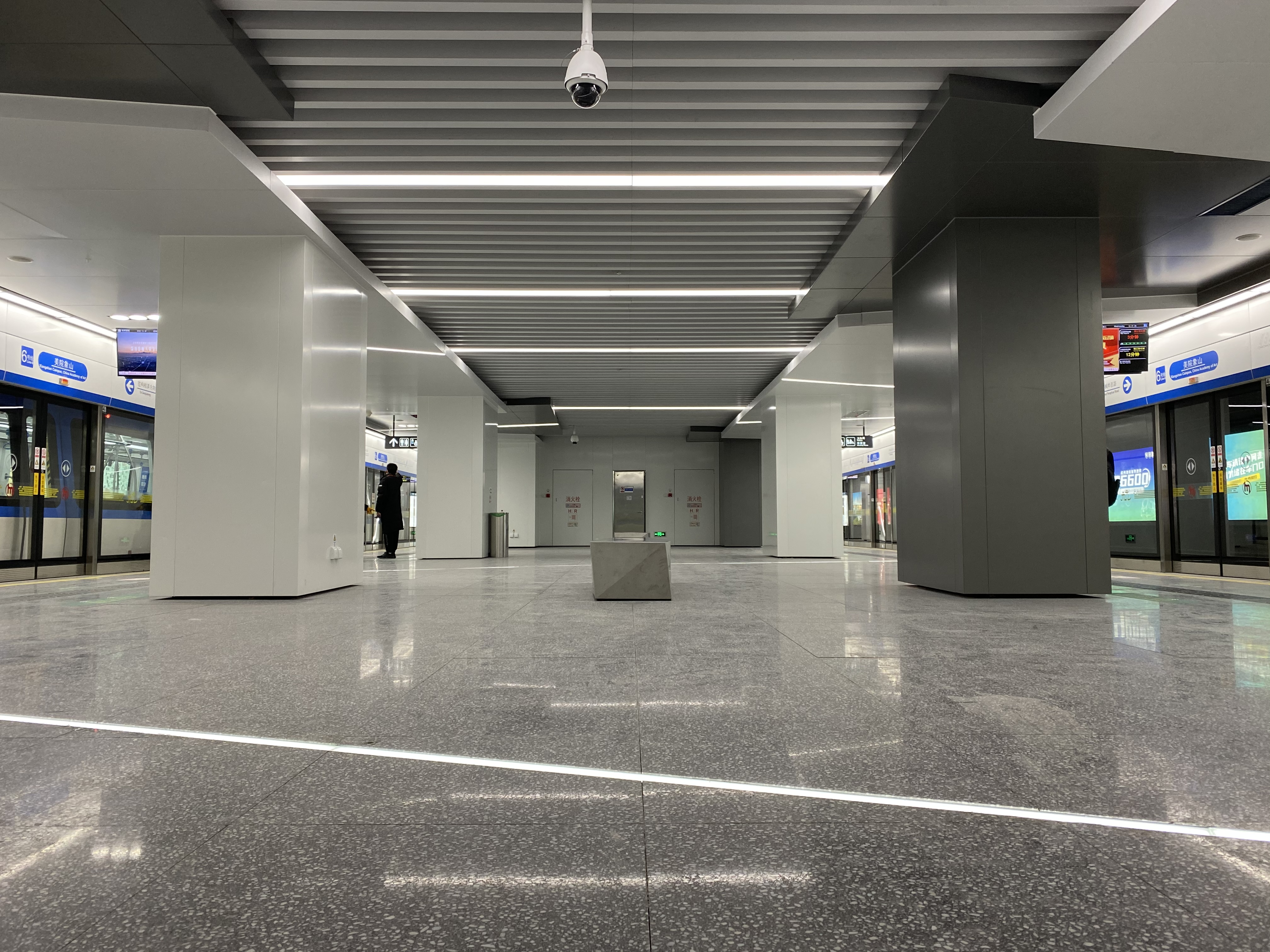
