= Kehai Road station =

Metro station in Hangzhou, China

Kehai Road 科海路
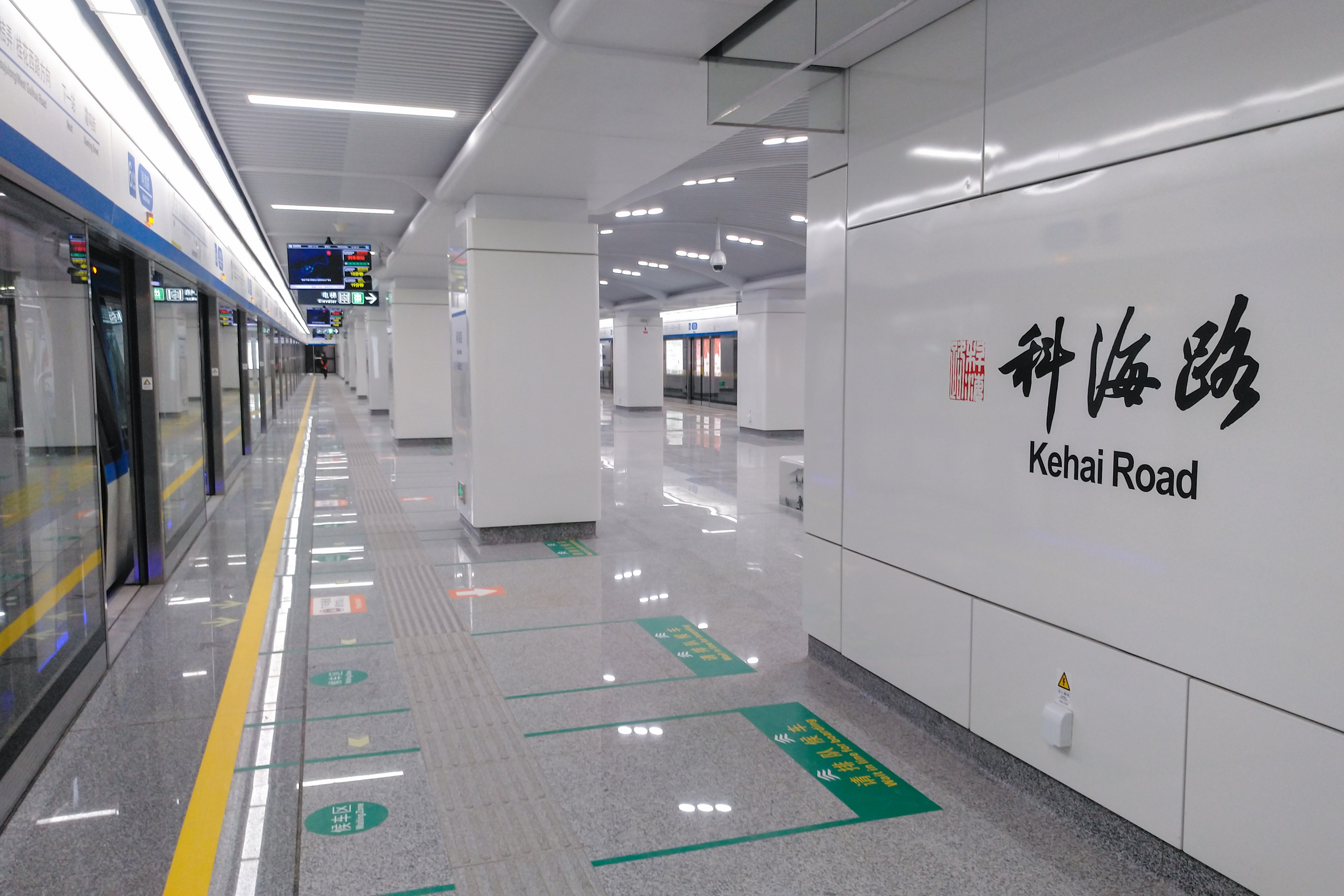

General information
- Location: Kehai Road; Xihu District, Hangzhou, Zhejiang; China
- Coordinates: 30°07′54″N 120°04′56″E
- System: Hangzhou metro station
- Operator: Hangzhou Metro Corporation
- Line: Line 6
- Platforms: 2 (1 island platform)

Construction
- Structure type: Underground
- Accessible: Yes

Other information
- Station code: KHL

History
- Opened: 30 December 2020

Services
Preceding station	Hangzhou Metro	Following station
Shuangpu Terminus	Line 6	Xiaming Street towards Goujulong
Location

Kehai Road (Chinese: 科海路) is a metro station on Line 6 of the Hangzhou Metro in China. It was opened on 30 December 2020, together with the Line 6. It is located in the Xihu District of Hangzhou.

== Station layout ==
Kehai Road has two levels: a concourse, and an island platform with two tracks for line 6.

== Entrances/exits ==
- A: east side of Kehai Road
- B1: west side of Kehai Road, Shilongshan Street
- B2: west side of Kehai Road, Heshan Street
- C: east side of Kehai Road, Heshan Street
