= Xiaming Street station =

Metro station in Hangzhou, China

Coordinates: 30.1457°N 120.0683°E

Xiaming Street 霞鸣街
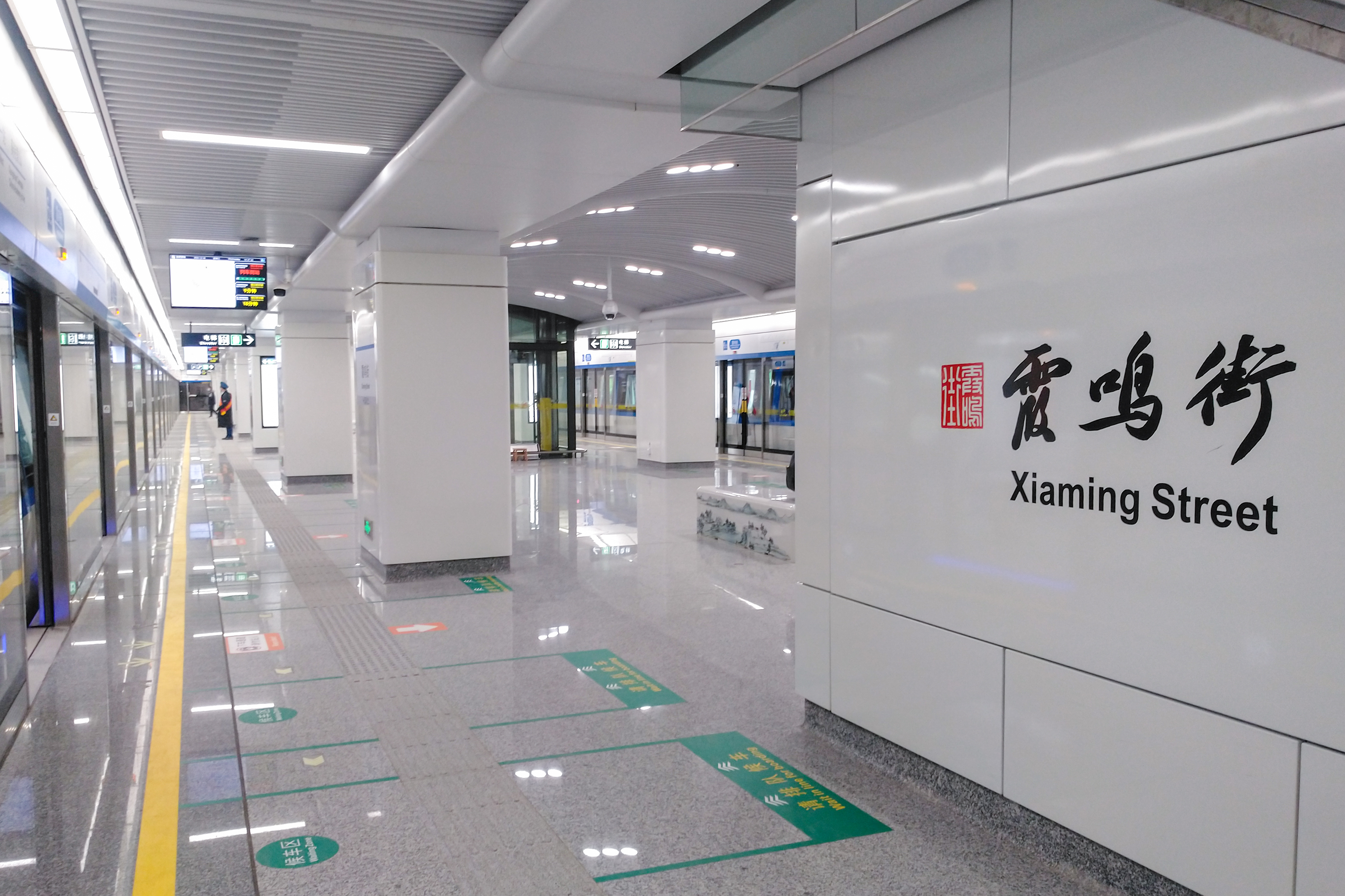

General information
- Location: Xihu District, Hangzhou, Zhejiang; China
- Operator: Hangzhou Metro Corporation
- Line: Line 6

Other information
- Station code: XMJ

History
- Opened: 30 December 2020

Services
Preceding station	Hangzhou Metro	Following station
Kehai Road towards Shuangpu	Line 6	Xiangshan Campus, China Academy of Art towards Goujulong
Location

Xiaming Street (Chinese: 霞鸣街) is a metro station on Line 6 of the Hangzhou Metro in China. It was opened on 30 December 2020, together with the Line 6. It is located in the Xihu District of Hangzhou.
