= Cangqian Campus, Hangzhou Normal University station =

Metro station in China

Cangqian Campus, Hangzhou Normal University 杭师大仓前
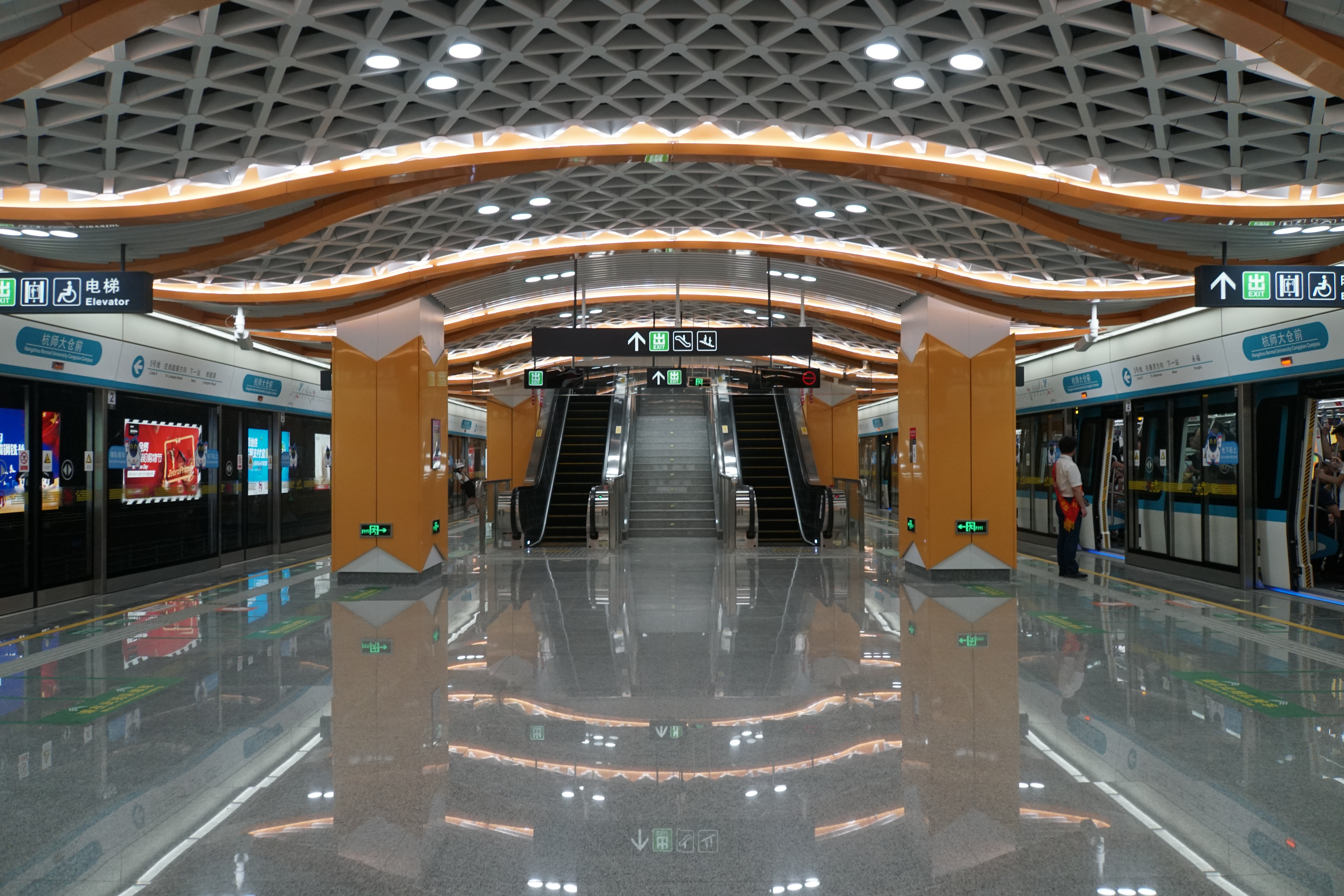
- Platforms

General information
- Location: Yuhangtang Road × Gaojiao Road; Yuhang District, Hangzhou, Zhejiang; China
- Coordinates: 30.290961°N 120.012731°E
- System: Hangzhou metro station
- Operator: Hangzhou MTR Line 5 Corporation
- Line: Line 5
- Platforms: 2 (1 island platform)

Construction
- Accessible: Yes

History
- Opened: June 24, 2019
- Former names: Hangzhou Normal University Cangqian Campus station (before May 2020)

Services
Preceding station	Hangzhou Metro	Following station
Liangmu Road towards East Nanhu	Line 5	Yongfu towards Guniangqiao
Location

Cangqian Campus, Hangzhou Normal University (simplified Chinese: 杭师大仓前; traditional Chinese: 杭師大倉前), formerly known as Hangzhou Normal University Cangqian Campus, is a metro station on Line 5 of the Hangzhou Metro in China. It is located in the Yuhang District of Hangzhou and it serves the Cangqian Campus of Hangzhou Normal University. It will be an interchange station of lines 5 and 12 in the future.

== Station layout ==
Cangqian Campus, Hangzhou Normal University has two levels: a concourse, and an island platform with two tracks for line 5.

== Entrances/exits ==
- A: Hangzhou Normal University (Cangqian Campus)
- B: Hangzhou Normal University (Cangqian Campus)
- C: south side of Yuhangtang Road, Gaojiao Road
- D: south side of Yuhangtang Road, Gaojiao Road
