= Shuangpu station =

Metro station in Hangzhou, China

Shuangpu 双浦
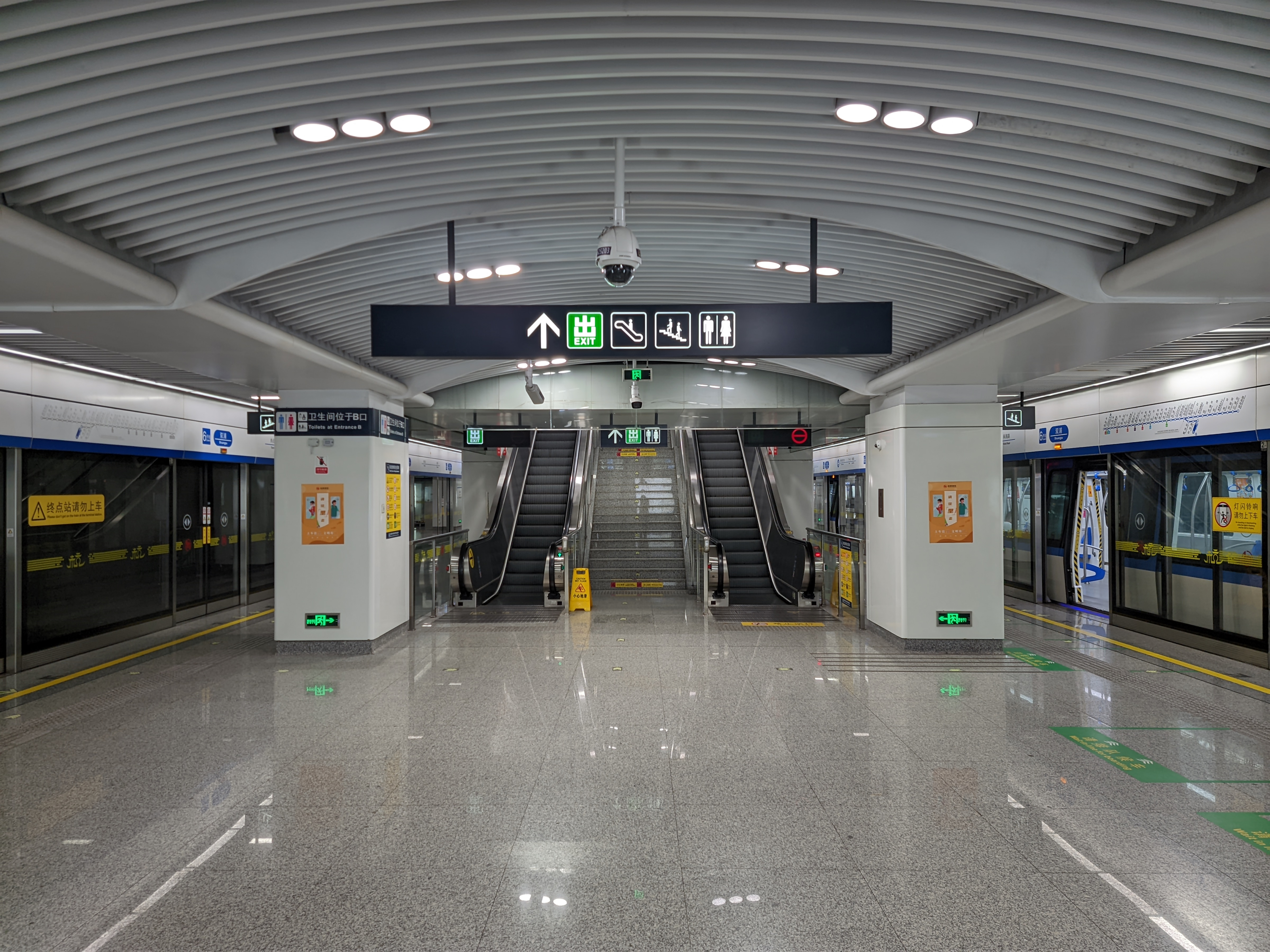
- Platform of Shuangpu station

General information
- Location: Xihu District, Hangzhou, Zhejiang; China
- Operator: Hangzhou Metro Corporation
- Line: Line 6

Other information
- Station code: SHP

History
- Opened: 30 December 2020

Services
Preceding station	Hangzhou Metro	Following station
Terminus	Line 6	Kehai Road towards Goujulong
Location

Shuangpu (Chinese: 双浦) is the western terminus of Line 6 of the Hangzhou Metro in China. It was opened on 30 December 2020, together with the Line 6. It is located in the Xihu District of Hangzhou.

== Gallery ==
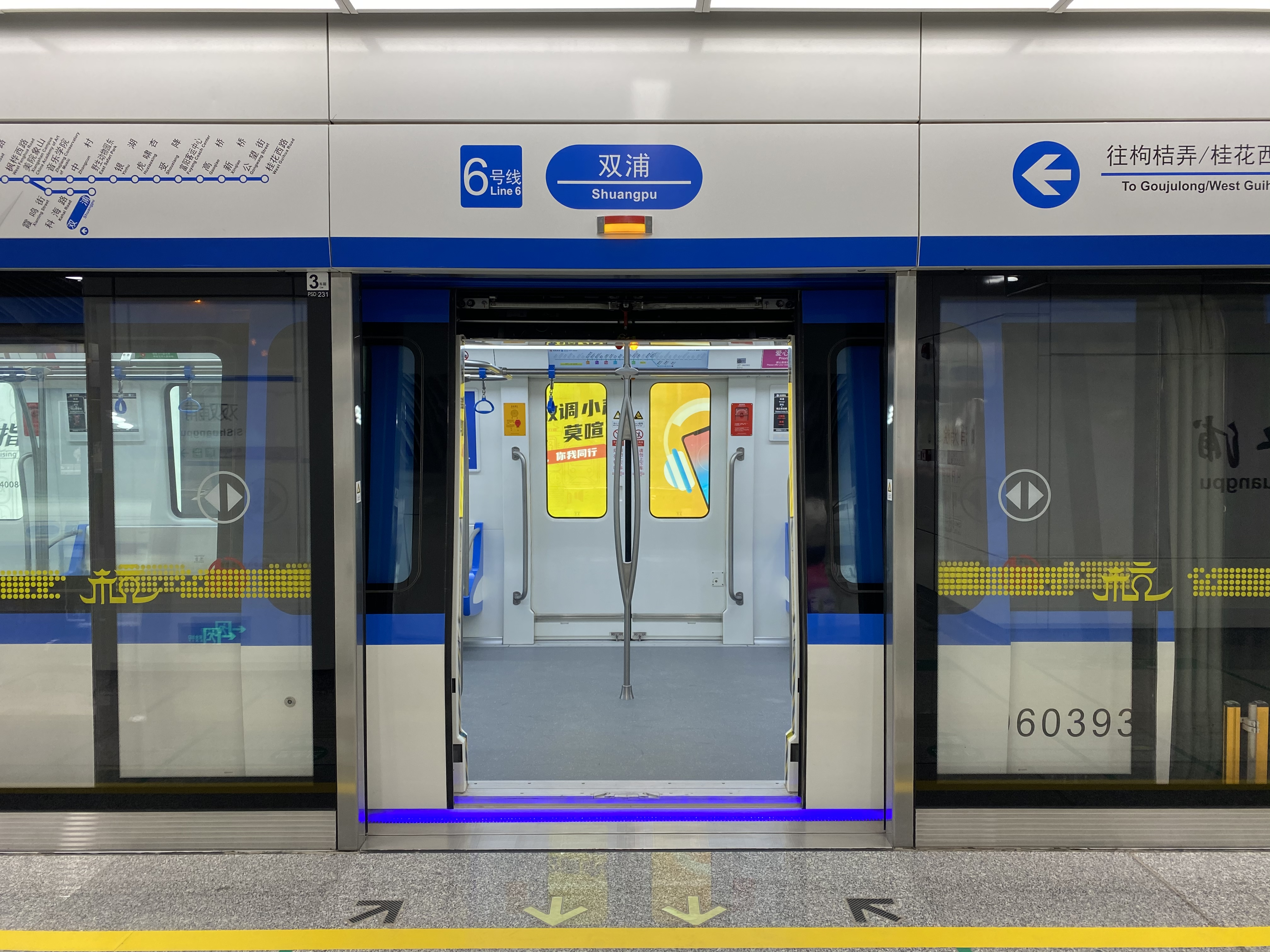
Train at Shuangpu Station

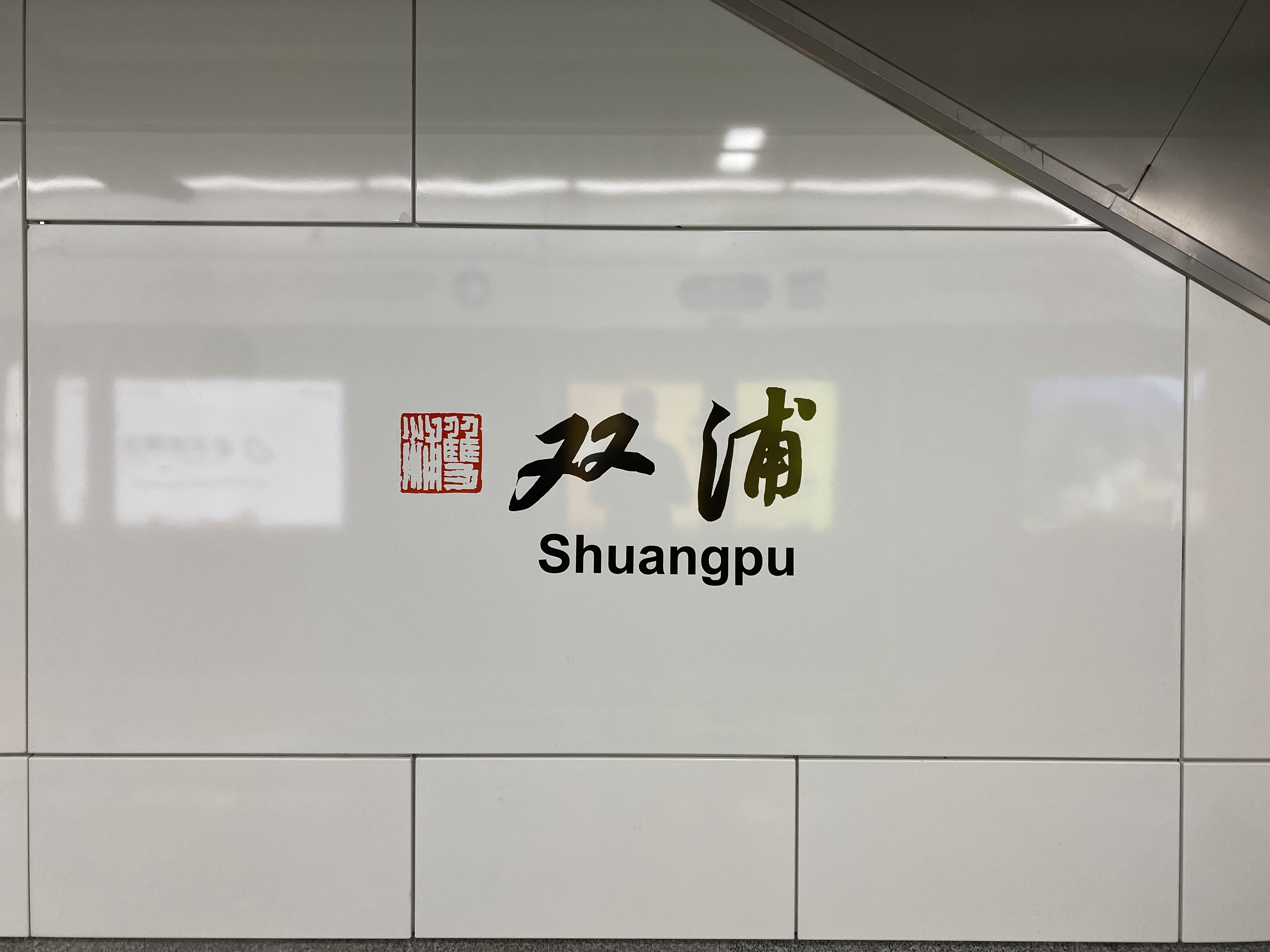
Station name in traditional Chinese calligraphy

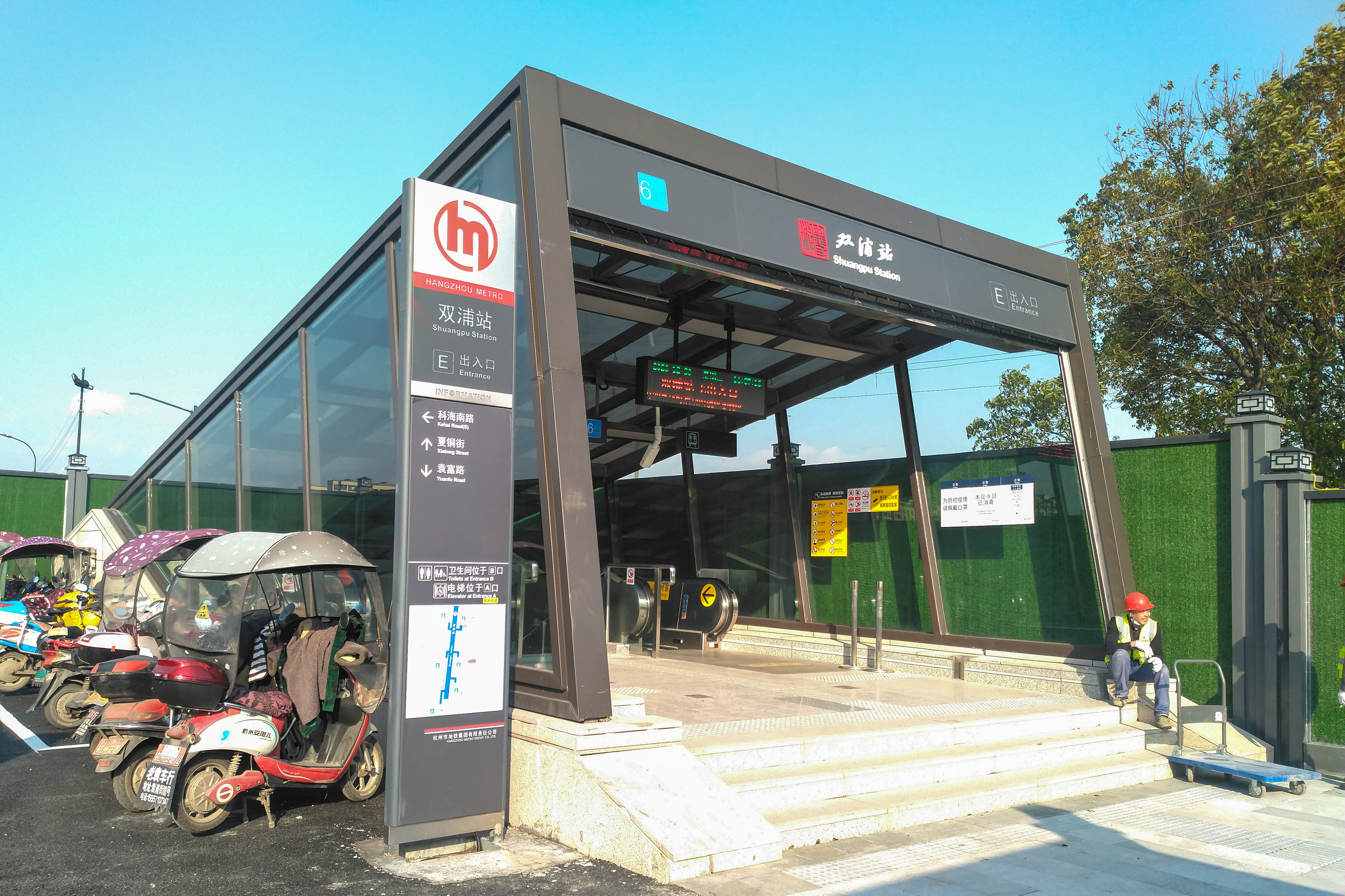
Exit E

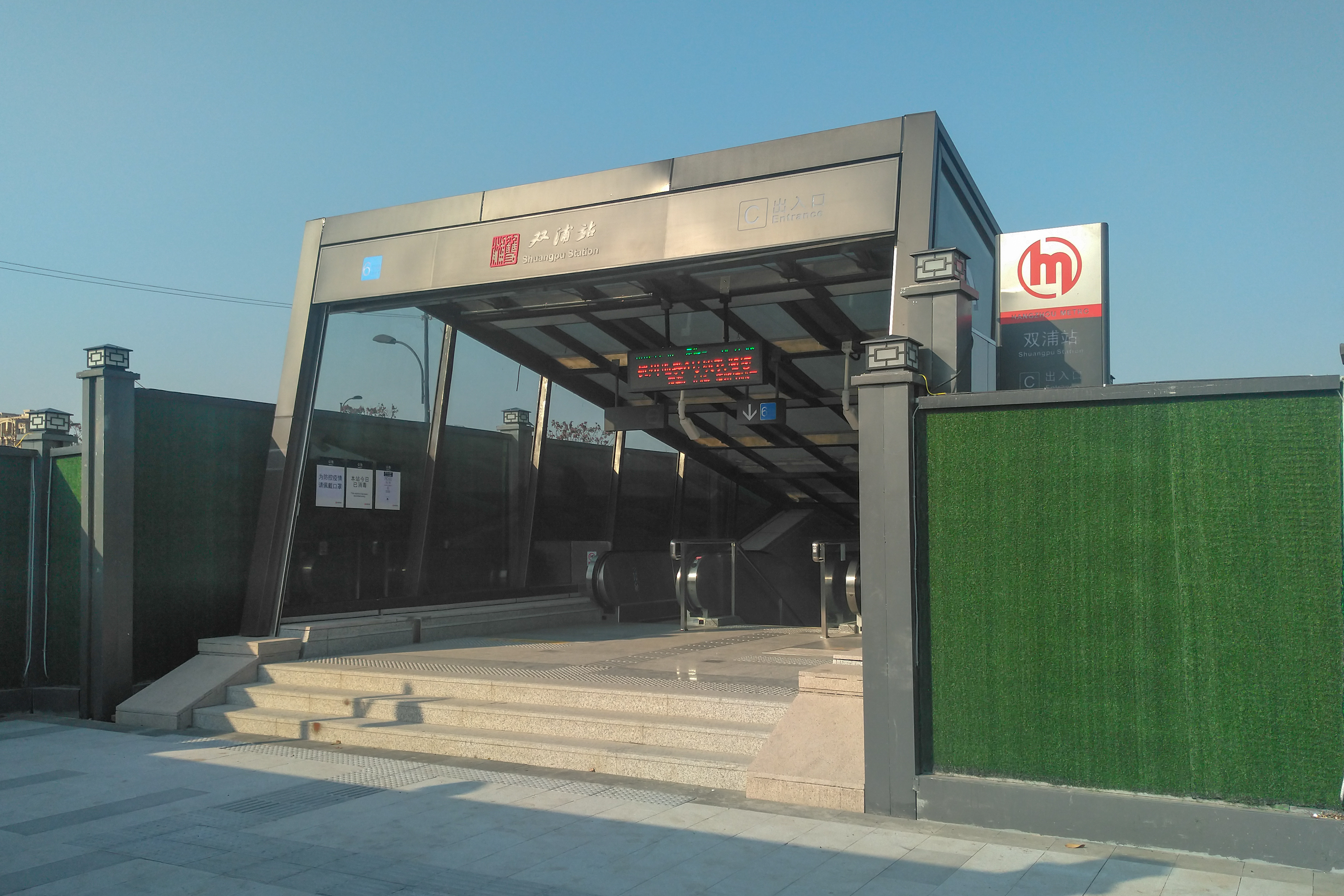
Exit C
