= Expo Center station (Hangzhou Metro) =

Metro station in Hangzhou, China

Expo Center 博览中心
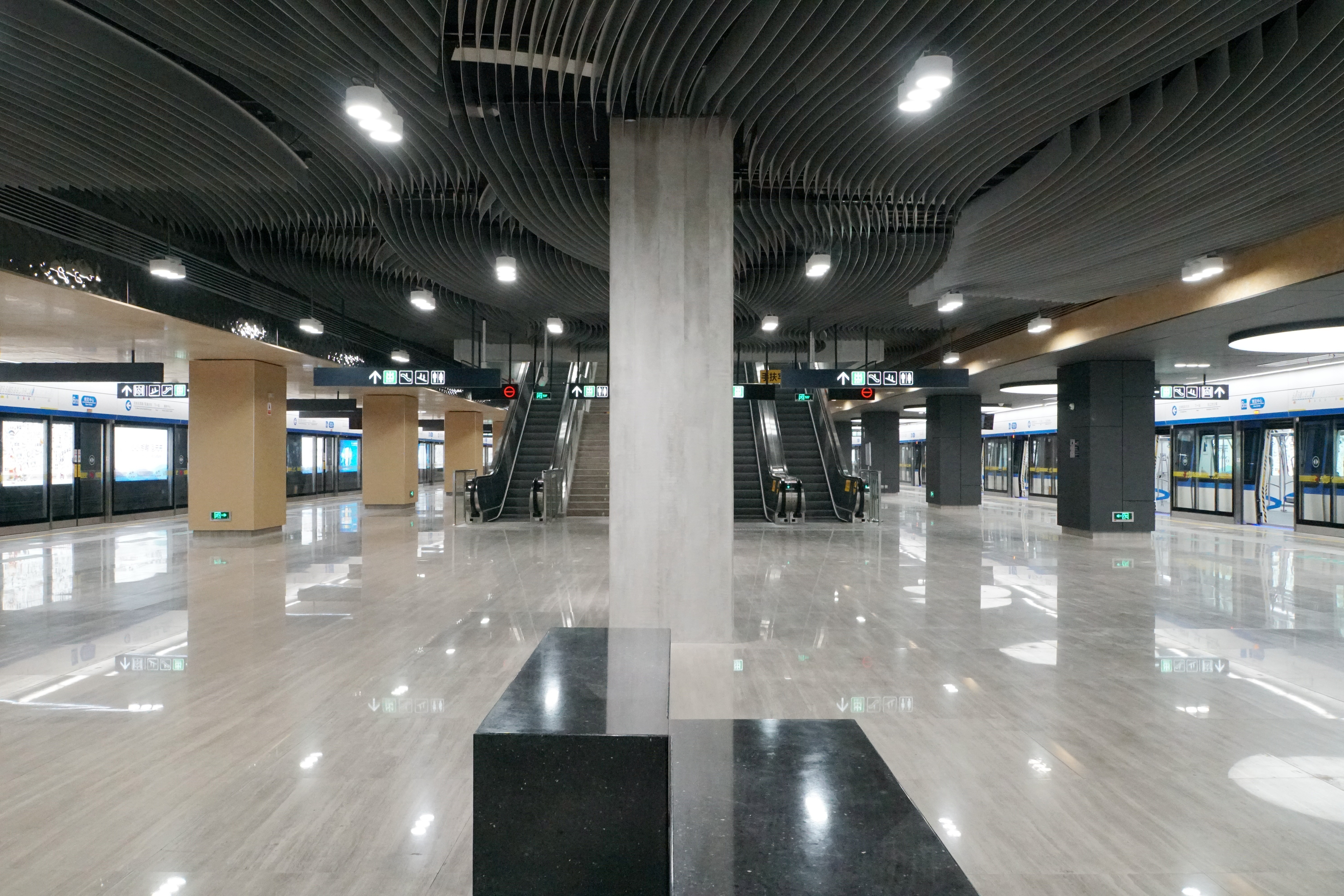
- Platform of Expo Center station

General information
- Location: Xiaoshan District, Hangzhou, Zhejiang; China
- Coordinates: 30.2350°N 120.2321°E
- Operator: Hangzhou Metro Corporation
- Line: Line 6

Other information
- Station code: BLZ

History
- Opened: 30 December 2020

Services
Preceding station	Hangzhou Metro	Following station
Olympic Sports Center towards West Guihua Road or Shuangpu	Line 6	Qianjiang Century City towards Goujulong
Location

Expo Center (Chinese: 博览中心) is a metro station of Line 6 of the Hangzhou Metro in China. It was opened on 30 December 2020, together with the Line 6. It is located in the Xiaoshan District of Hangzhou, near the Hangzhou International Exhibition Center, which was the venue of 2016 G20 Hangzhou Summit.

== Gallery ==
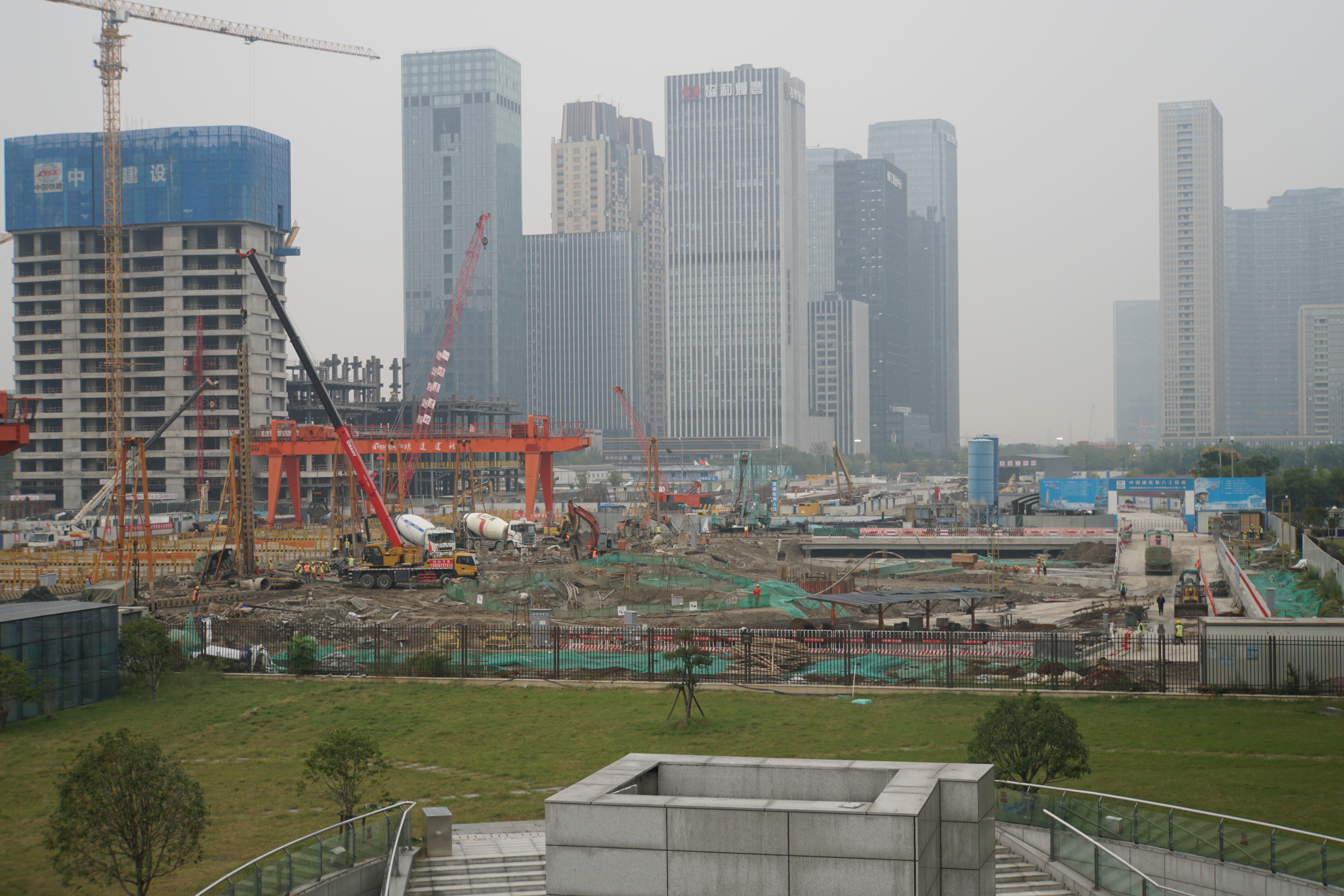
Expo Center station under construction (October 2018)

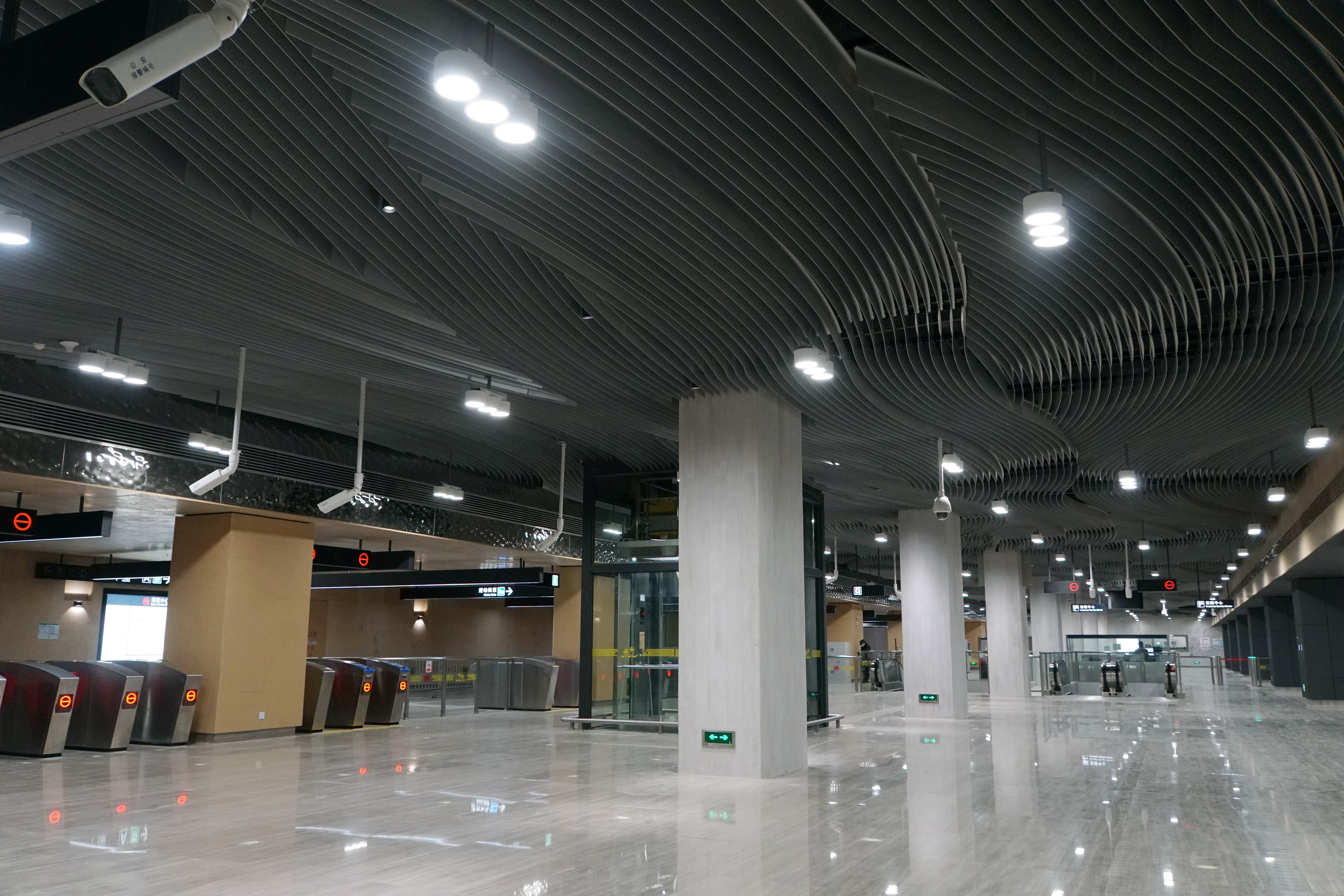
Ceiling in the concourse

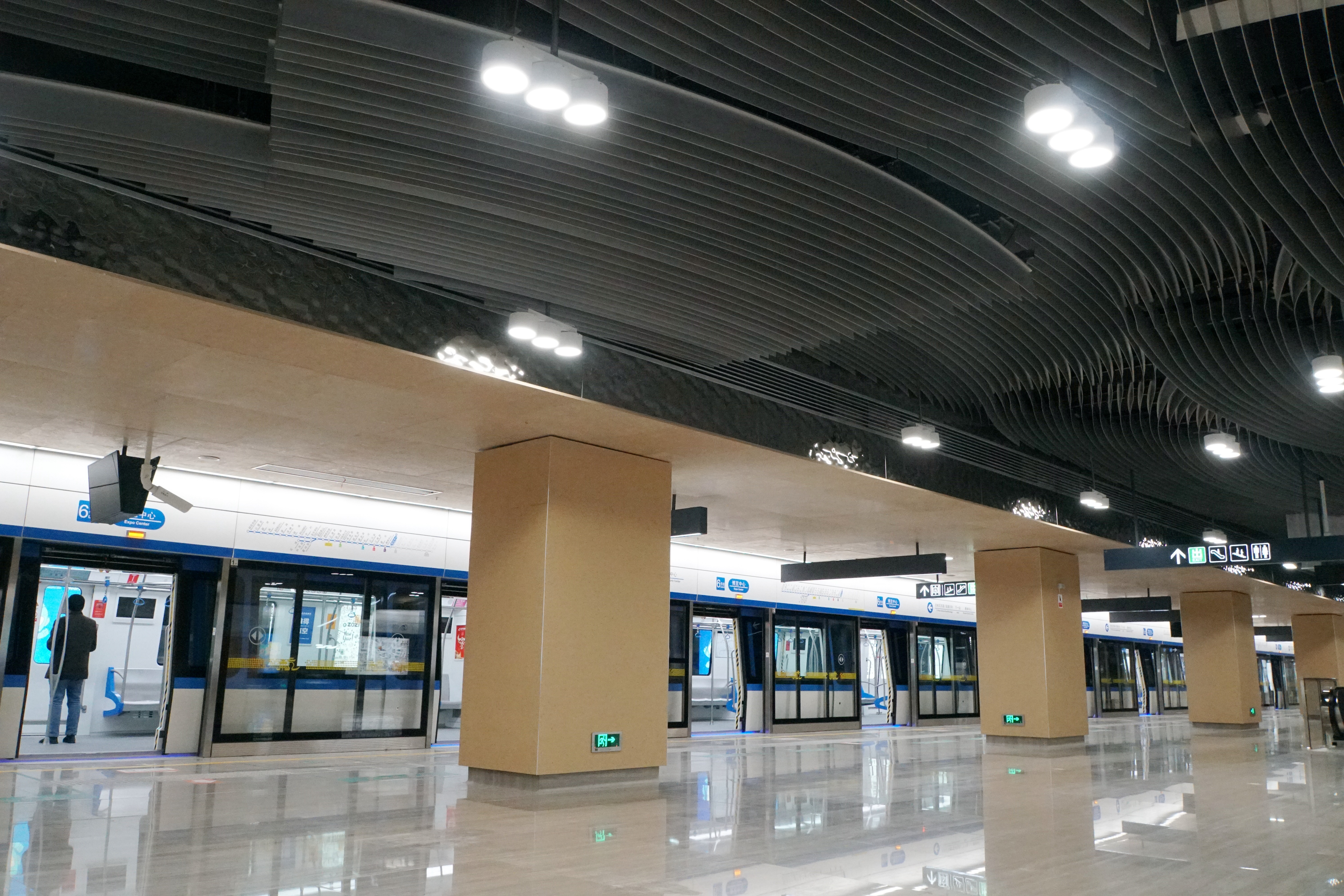
Ceiling in the platform
