= Xingyi station =

Metro station in China

Xingyi 兴议
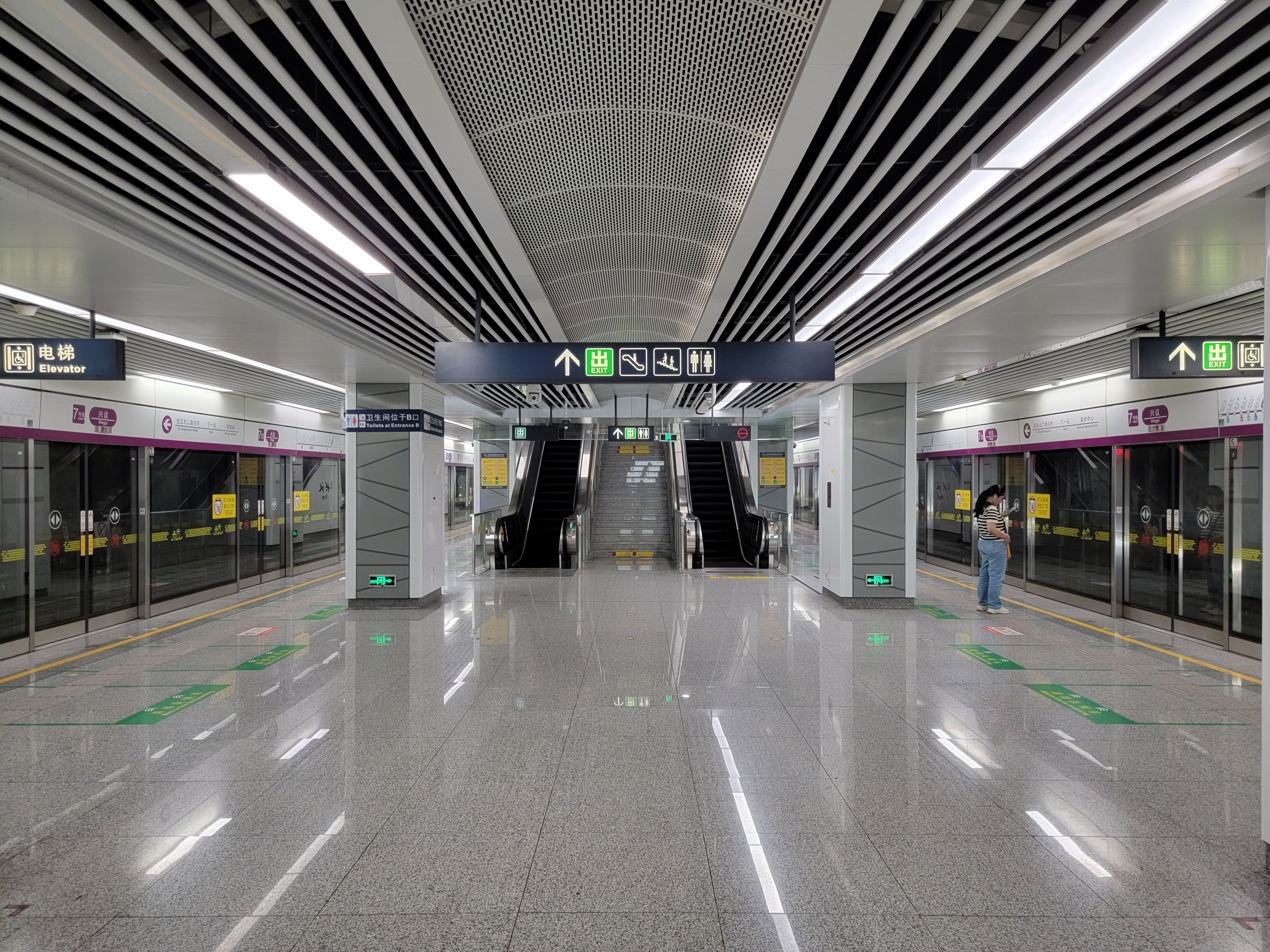
- Platforms

General information
- Location: Xiaoyou Road (萧邮路) × Jianshe 4 Road (建设四路); Xiaoshan District, Hangzhou, Zhejiang; China
- Coordinates: 30°12′51″N 120°14′02″E
- System: Hangzhou Metro
- Operator: Hangzhou Metro Corporation
- Line: Line 7
- Platforms: 2 (1 island platform)

Construction
- Structure type: Underground
- Accessible: Yes

History
- Opened: 30 December 2020

Services
Preceding station	Hangzhou Metro	Following station
Olympic Sports Center towards Wushan Square	Line 7	Mingxing Road towards Jiangdong'er Road
Location

Xingyi (simplified Chinese: 兴议; traditional Chinese: 興議) is a metro station on Line 7 of the Hangzhou Metro in China. Opened on 30 December 2020, it is located in the Xiaoshan District of Hangzhou.

== Station layout ==
Xingyi has two levels: a concourse, and an island platform with two tracks for line 7.

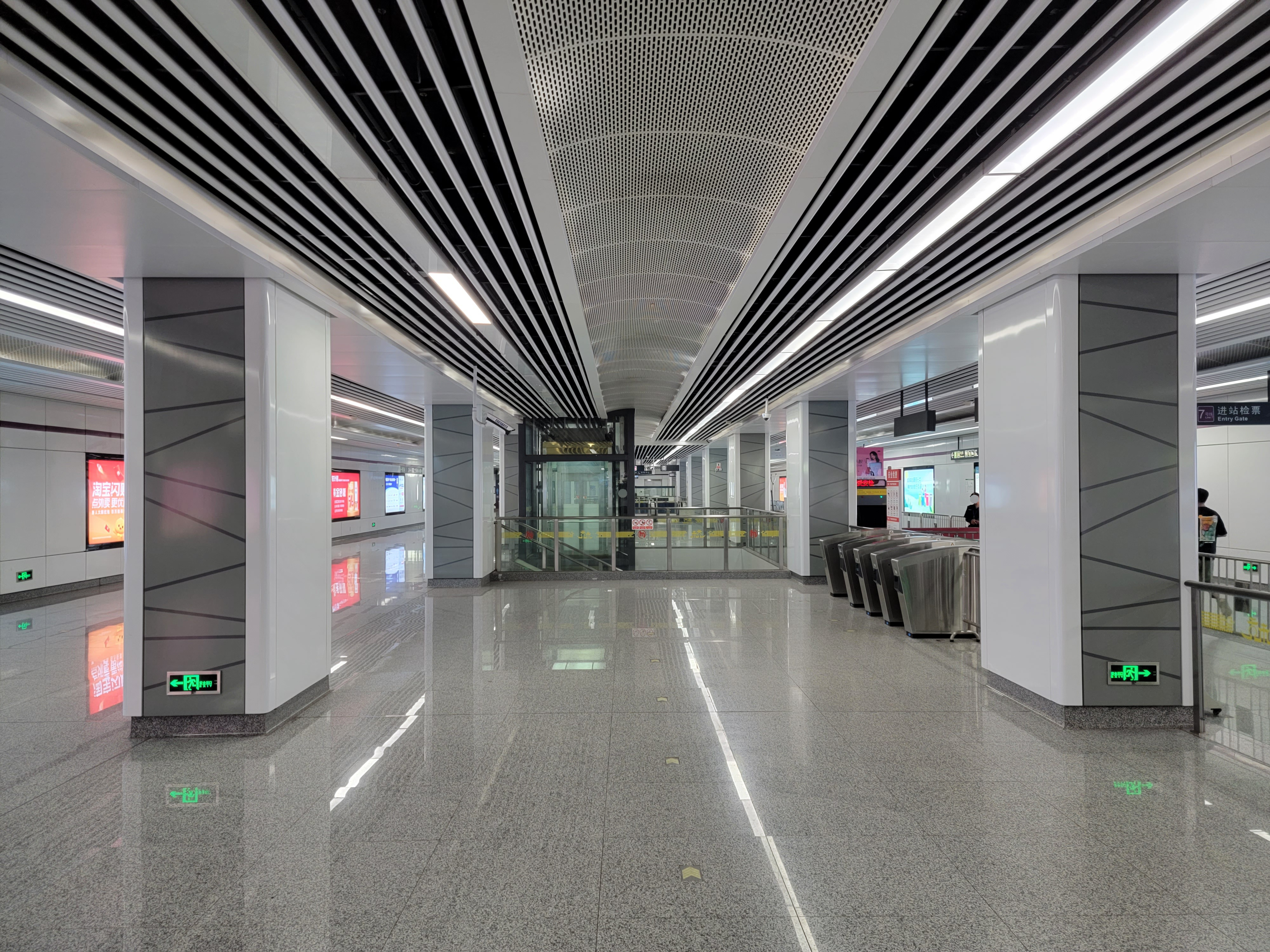
Concourse

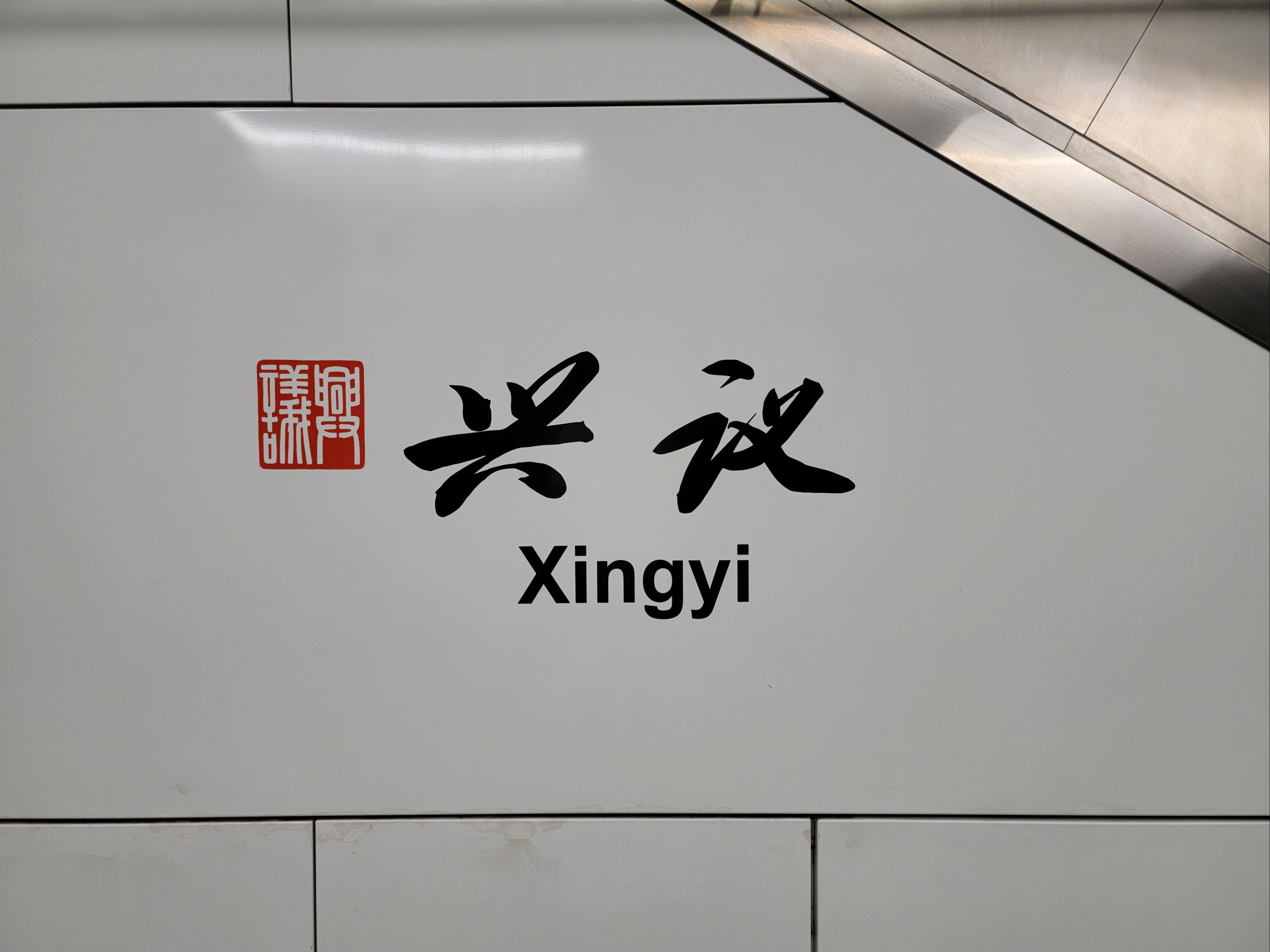
Station name in Chinese calligraphy

== Entrances/exits ==
- A: Jindi T-ONE MO shopping center
- B: east side of Xiaoyou Road, north side of Jianshe 4 Road
- D: south side of Jianshe 4 Road, east side of Xiaoyou Road
