= Qianjiang Century City station =

Hangzhou Metro station

Qianjiang Century City 钱江世纪城
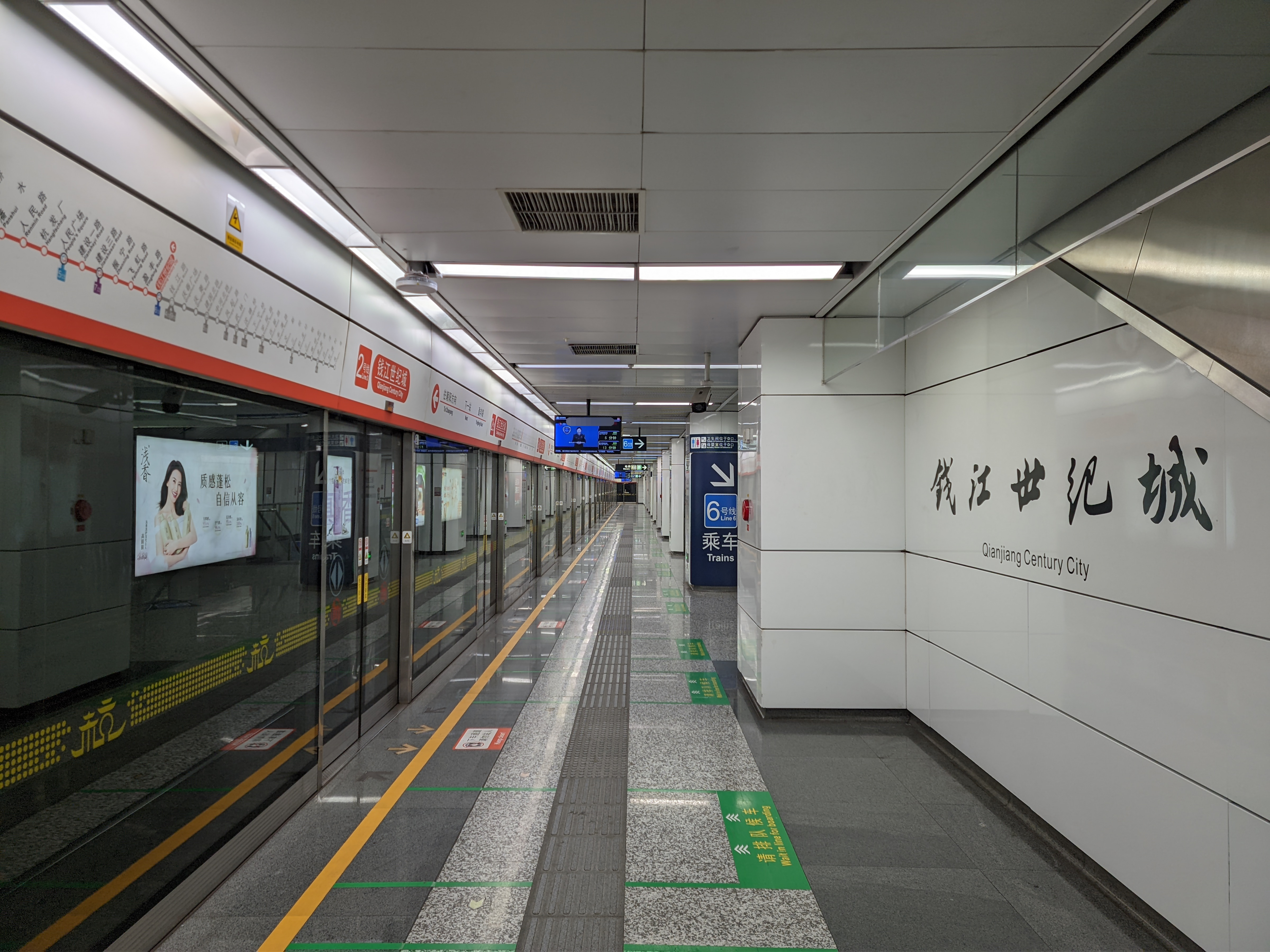
- Platforms of Line 2

General information
- Location: Shixin Rd. (N) × Pinglan Rd. Xiaoshan District, Hangzhou, Zhejiang; China
- Coordinates: 30.1419°N 120.1413°E
- Operated by: Hangzhou Metro Corporation
- Lines: Line 2 Line 6
- Platforms: 4 (2 island platforms)

History
- Opened: 28 April 2016 (Line 2); 30 December 2020 (Line 6)

Services
Preceding station	Hangzhou Metro	Following station
Yingfeng Road towards Chaoyang	Line 2	Qianjiang Road towards Liangzhu
Expo Center towards West Guihua Road or Shuangpu	Line 6	Fengbei towards Goujulong
Route map
Location

Qianjiang Century City (Chinese: 钱江世纪城) is a metro station on Line 2 and Line 6 of the Hangzhou Metro in China. It is located in the Xiaoshan District of Hangzhou. The Line 2 part of the station was opened on 28 April 2016. The Line 6 part of the station was opened on 30 December 2020.

== Station layout ==
Qianjiang Century City has three levels: a concourse, and separate levels for lines 2 and 6. Basement 2 is for line 2, and basement 3 is for line 6. Each of these consists of an island platform with two tracks.

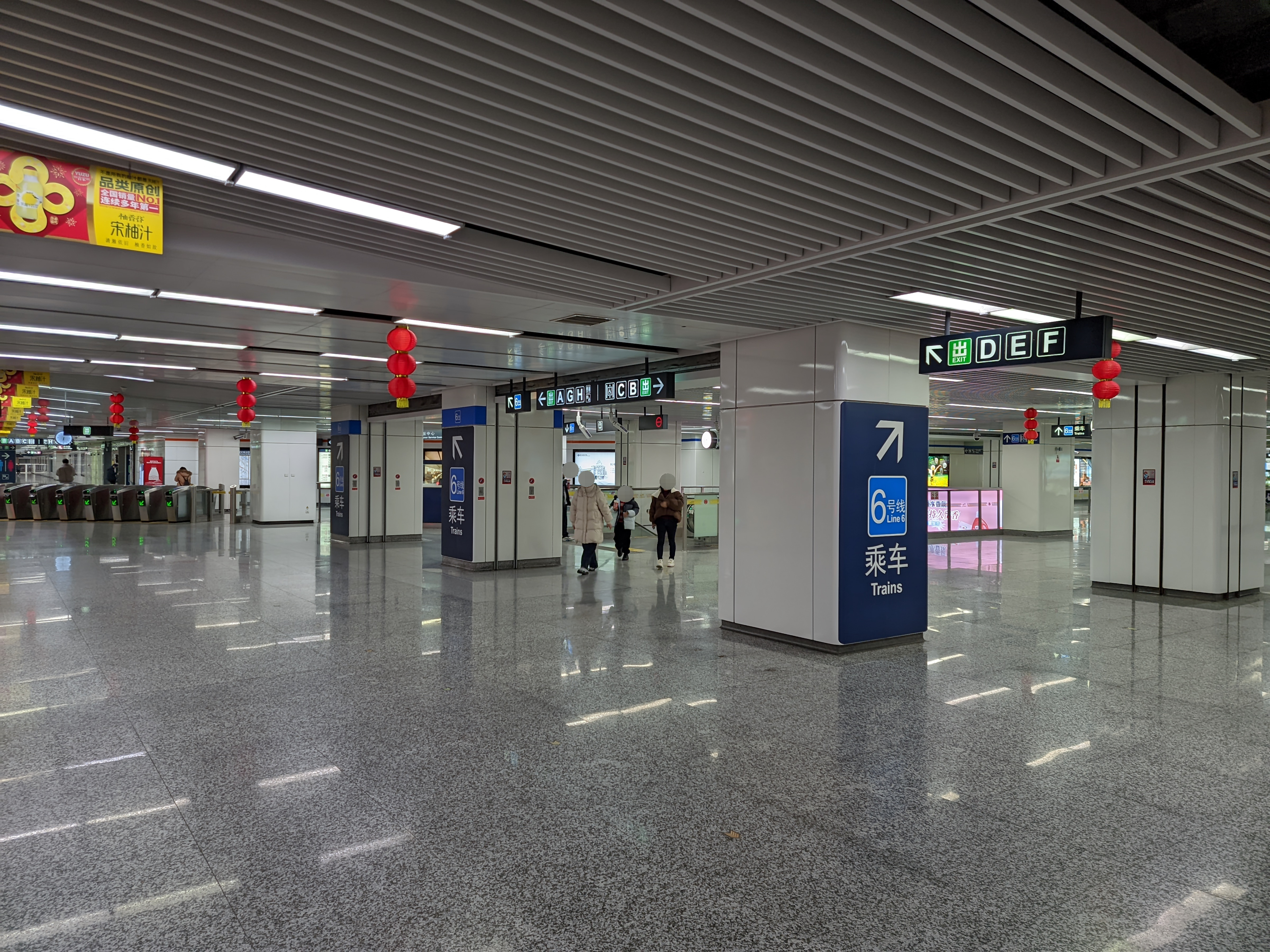
Concourse

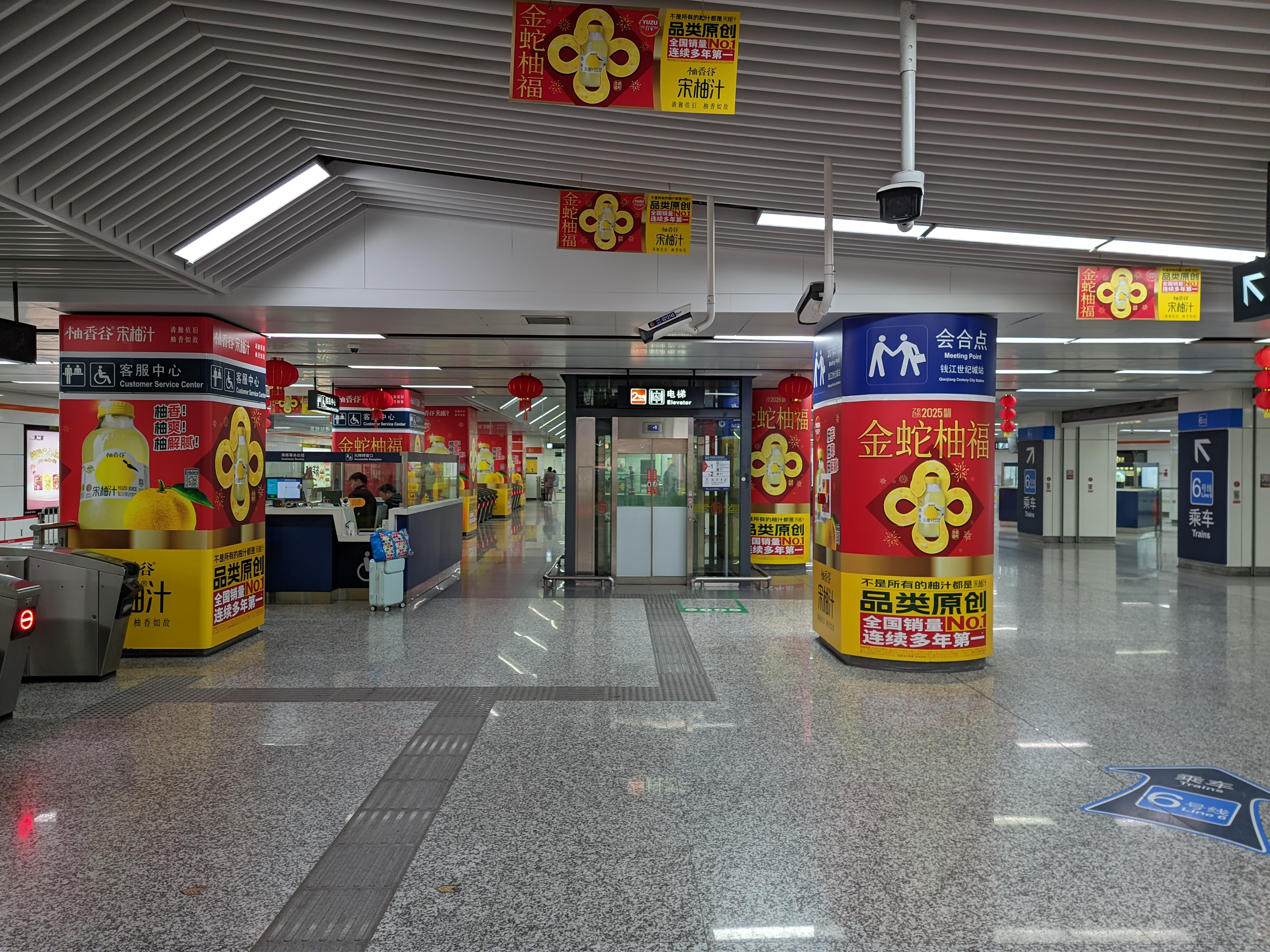
Concourse

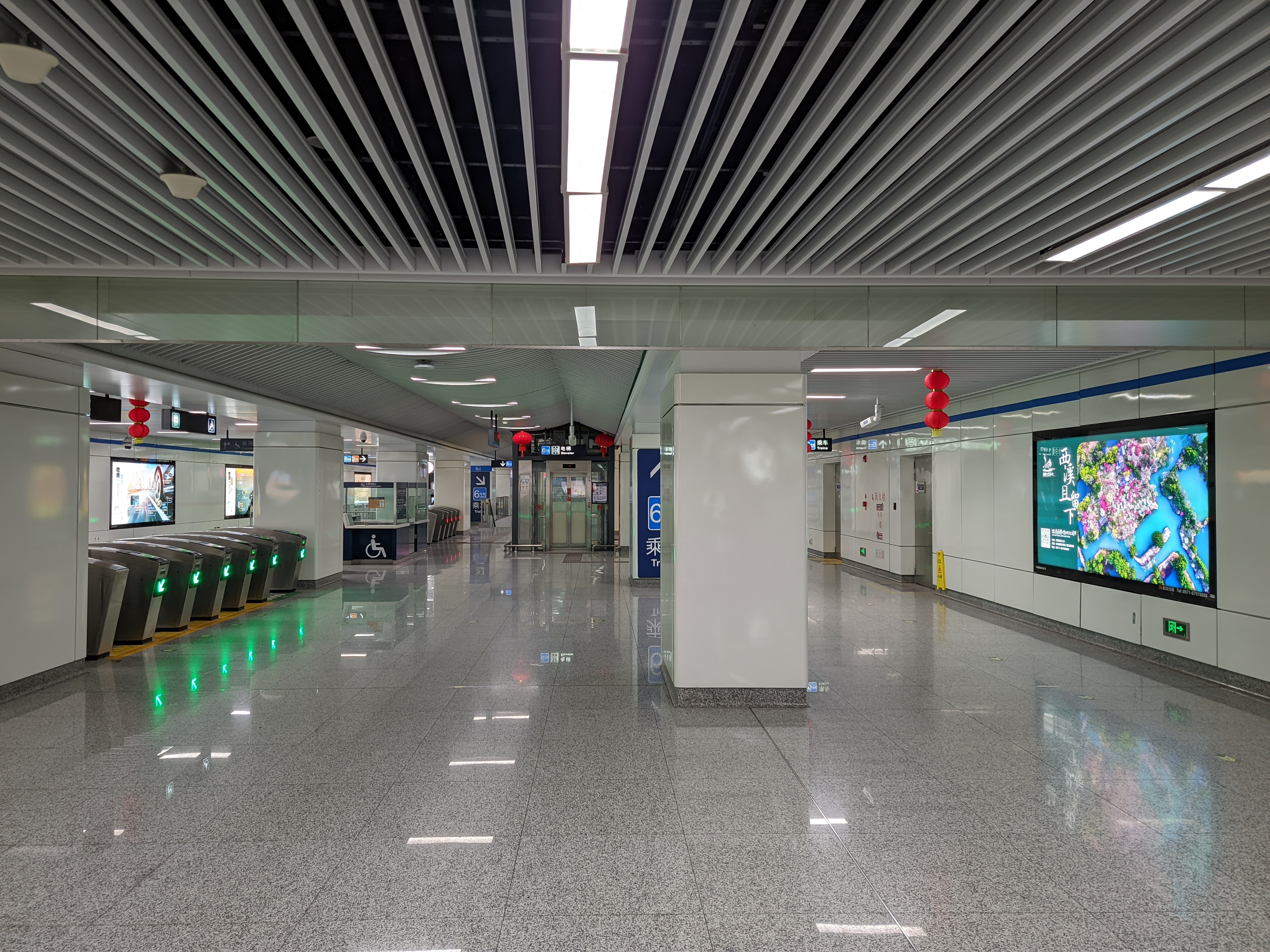
Concourse

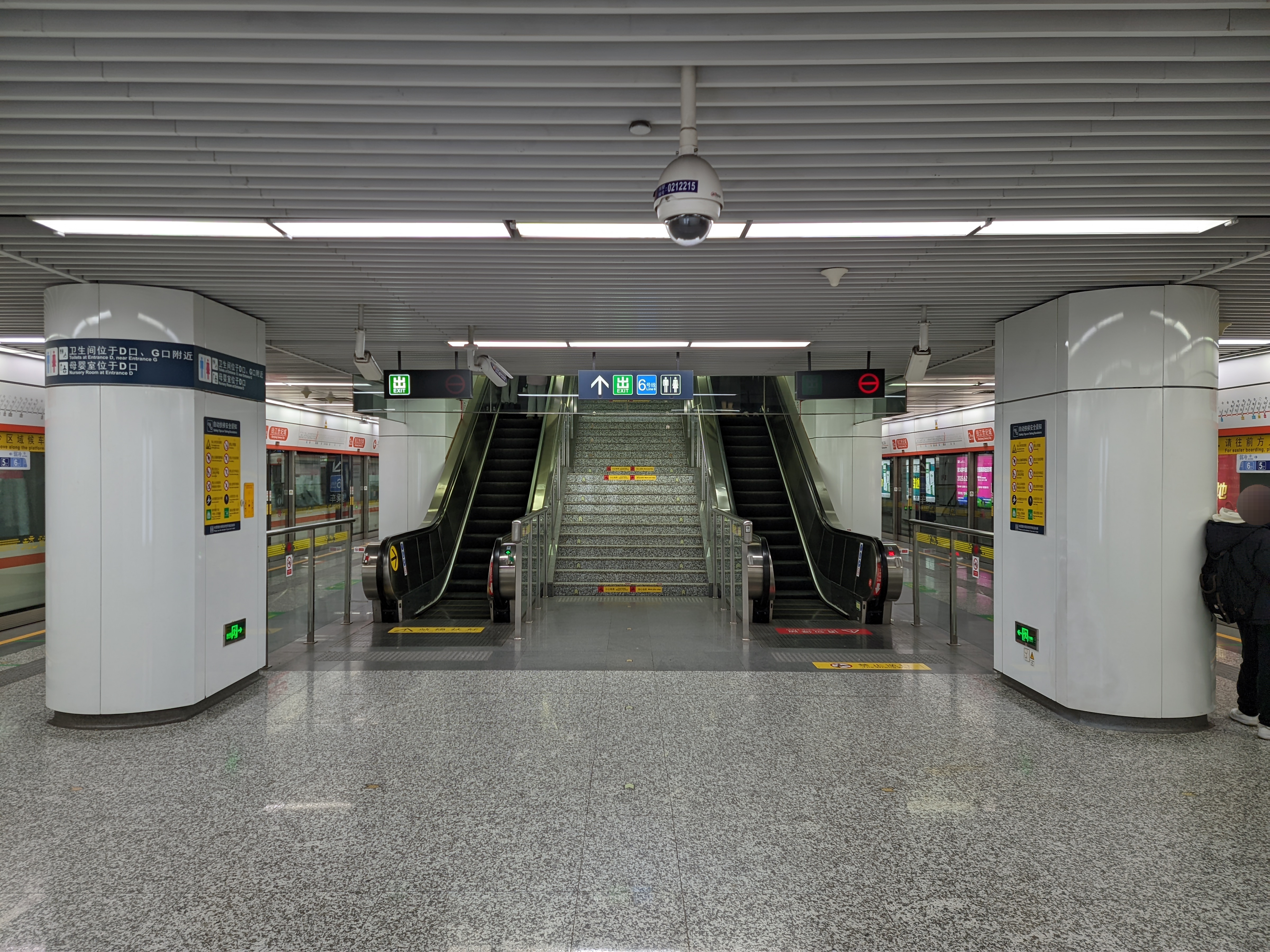
Line 2 platforms

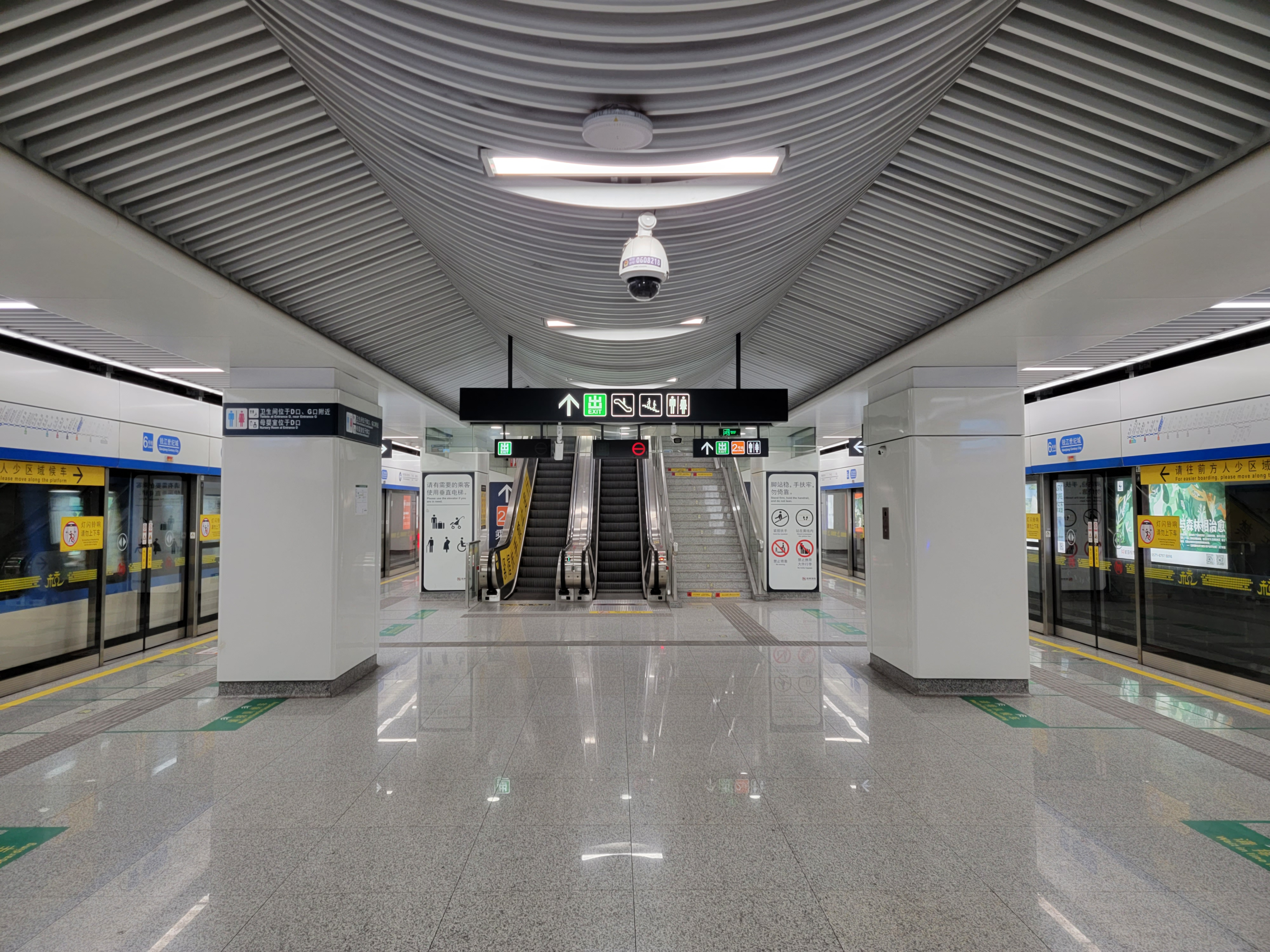
Line 6 platforms

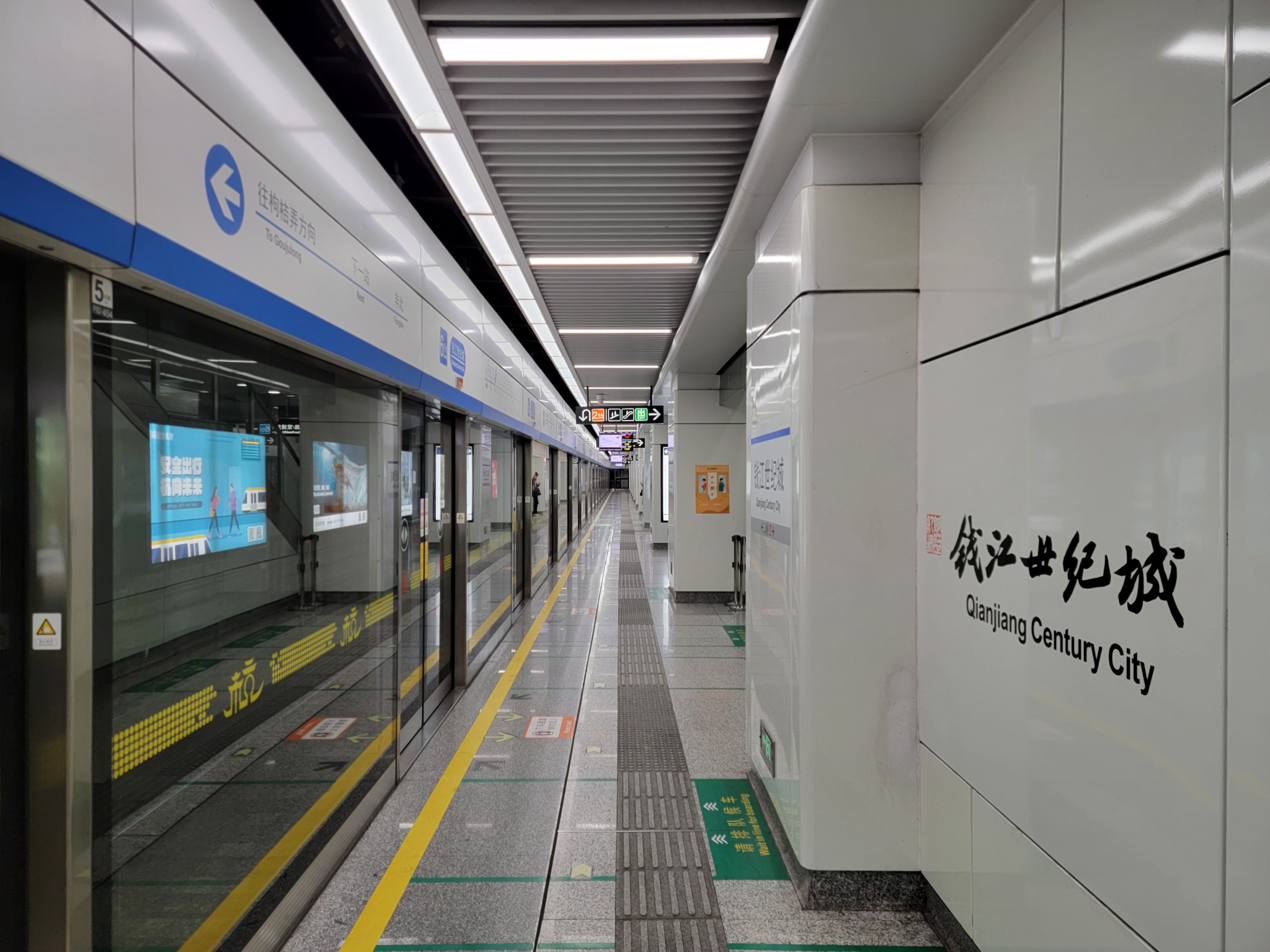
Line 6 platforms

== Entrances/exits ==
- A1: south side of Shixin Rd. (N)
- B: Qianjiang Century Park
- C: Qianjiang Century Park, Chunyin Street
- D: west side of Pinglan Rd., north side of Minhe Rd.
- E1: north side of Minhe Rd., west side of Pinglan Rd.
- E2: north side of Minhe Rd., east side of Pinglan Rd.
- E3a & E3b: Zhejiang Shanghui Building, Transfer Building
- E4: south side of Minhe Rd., east side of Pinglan Rd.
- F1 & F2: D+Park
- G: D+Park
- H1: Qisheng Alley
- H2a: south side of Shixin Rd. (N)
