= Asian Games Village station =

Metro station in China

Asian Games Village 亚运村
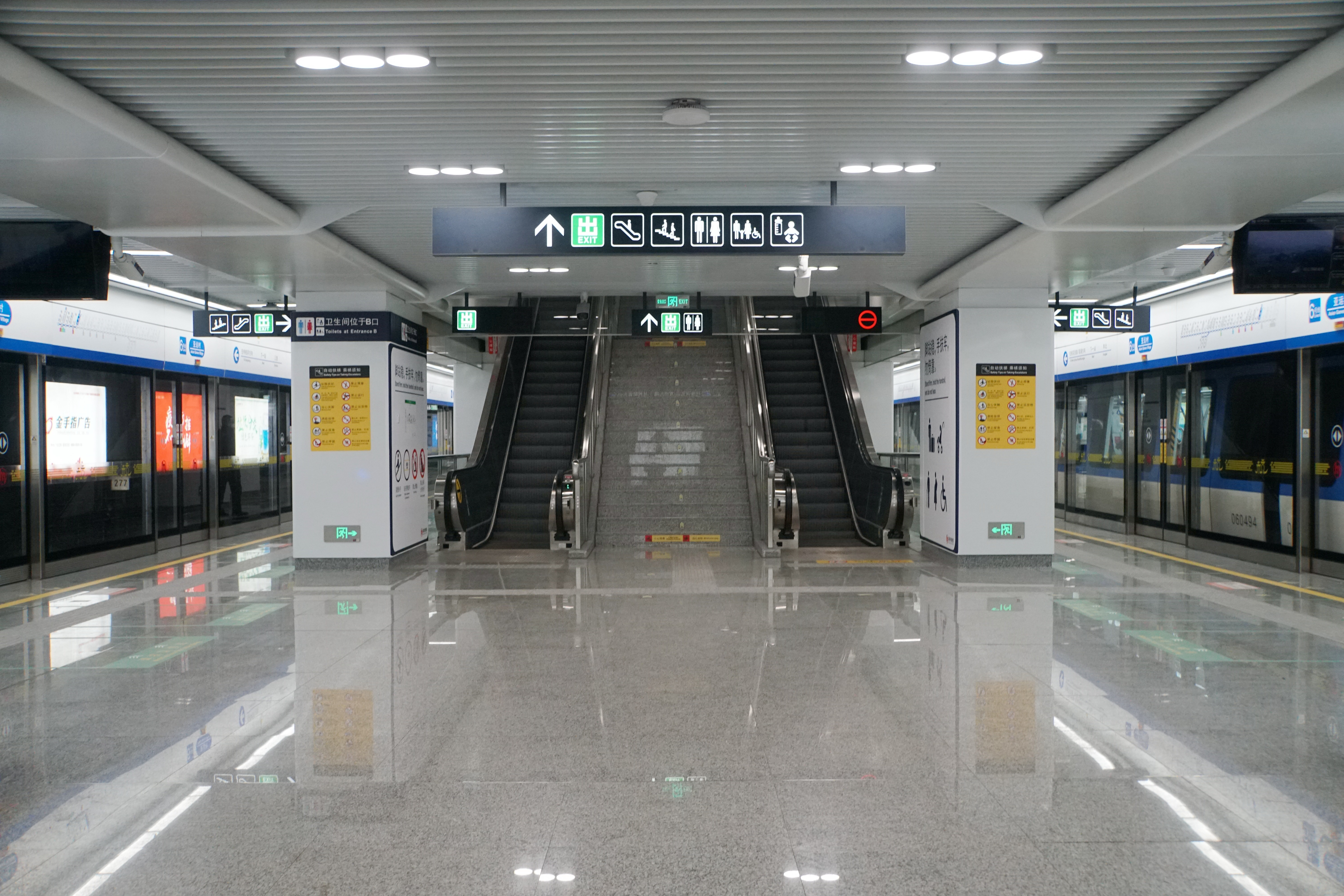
- Platforms

General information
- Location: Shijiu Street × Yayuncun Road; Xiaoshan District, Hangzhou, Zhejiang; China
- Coordinates: 30°15′36.086″N 120°14′34.865″E
- System: Hangzhou metro station
- Operator: Hangzhou Metro Corporation
- Line: Line 6
- Platforms: 2 (1 island platform)

Construction
- Structure type: Underground
- Accessible: Yes

Services
Preceding station	Hangzhou Metro	Following station
Fengbei towards West Guihua Road or Shuangpu	Line 6	Sanbao towards Goujulong
Location

Asian Games Village (simplified Chinese: 亚运村; traditional Chinese: 亞運村) is a metro station on Line 6 of the Hangzhou Metro in China. It is located in Xiaoshan District of Hangzhou, at the intersection of Shijiu Street and Yayuncun Road. It opened on February 21, 2023.

== Station layout ==
Asian Games Village station has three levels: basement 1 is a concourse, and basement 3 is an island platform with two tracks for line 6.

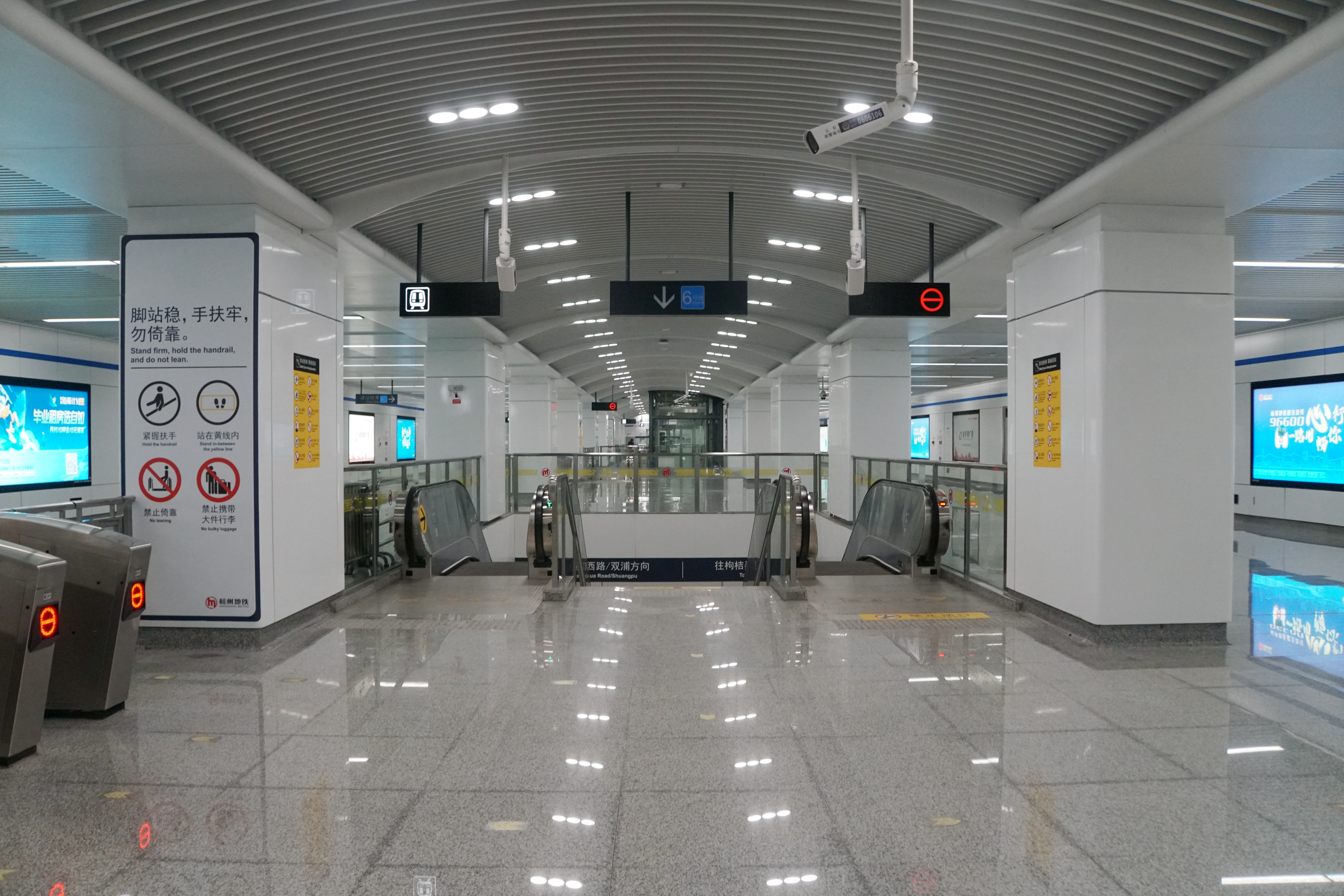
Concourse

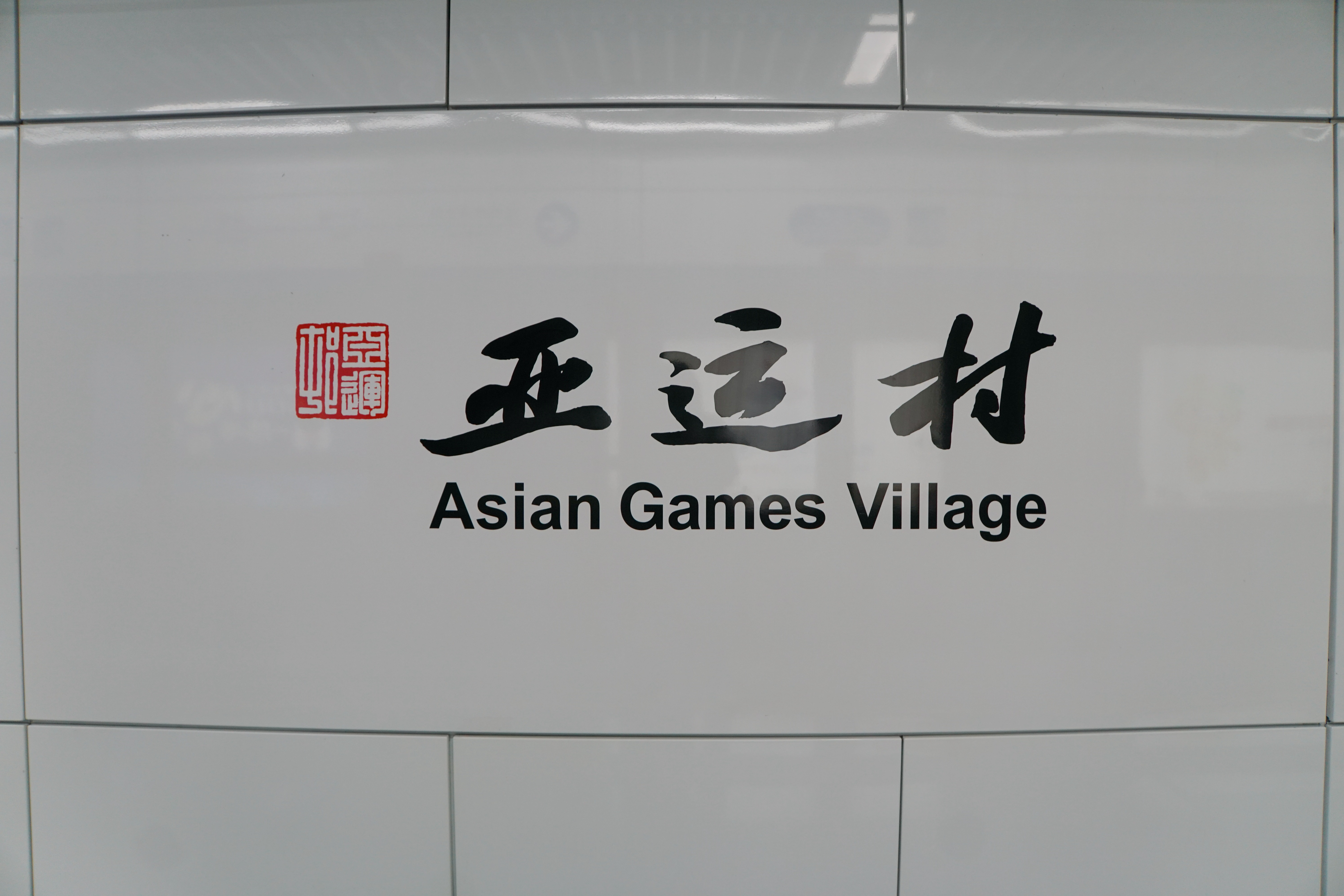
Station name in Chinese calligraphy

== Entrances/exits ==
- A: north side of Shijiu Street, Guanlan Road
- B: south side of Shijiu Street, Guanlan Road
- C: east side of Yayuncun Road, south side of Shijiu Street
- D: Ningchao Meidi Apartment (Zone 4)
