= Olympic Sports Center station (Hangzhou Metro) =

Metro station in Hangzhou, China

Olympic Sports Center 奥体中心
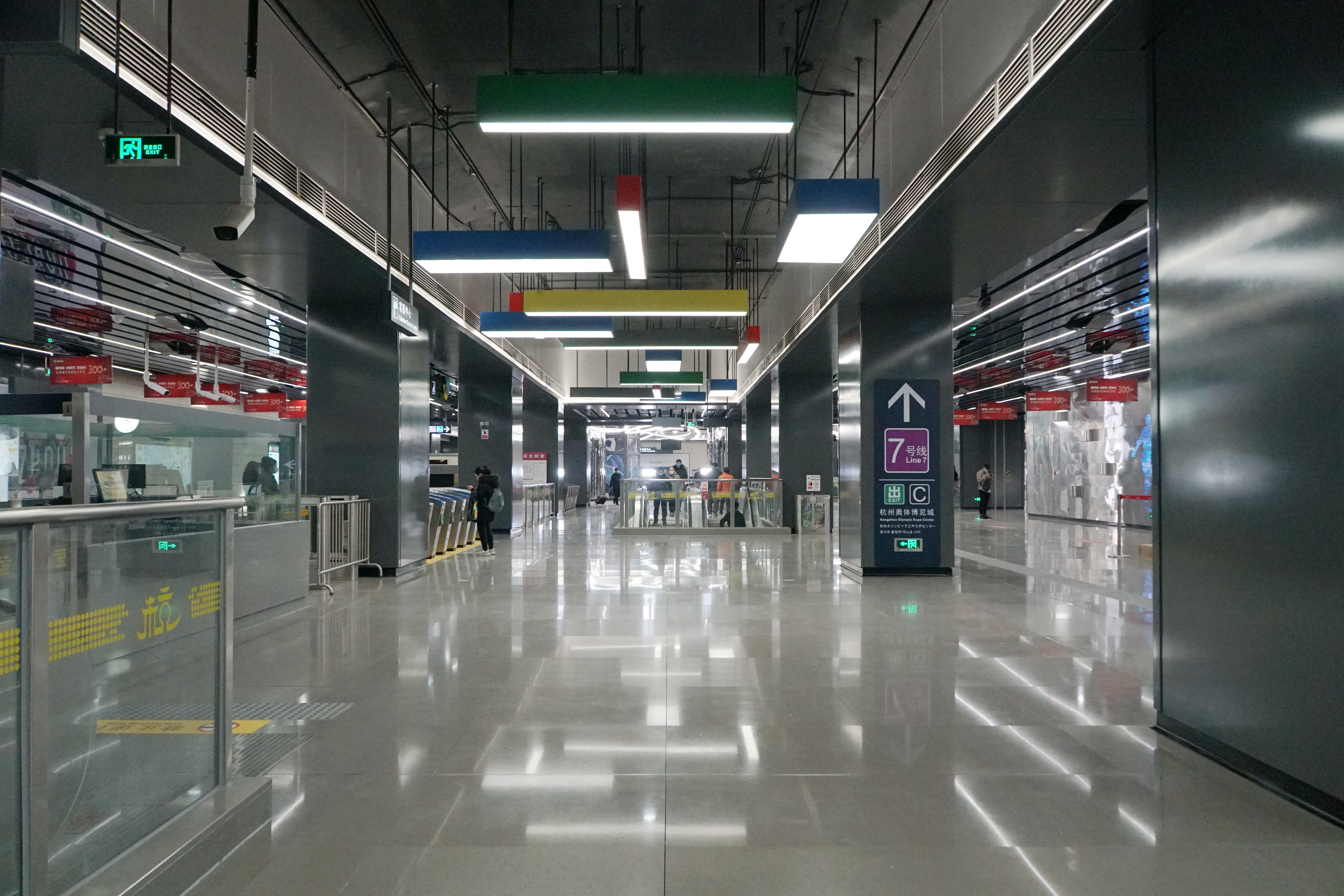
- Concourse

General information
- Location: Feihong Road × Qijiazha Alley; Binjiang District, Hangzhou, Zhejiang; China
- Coordinates: 30.2260°N 120.2284°E
- Operator: Hangzhou Metro Corporation
- Lines: Line 6 Line 7
- Platforms: 4 (2 island platforms)

Other information
- Station code: ATZ

History
- Opened: 30 December 2020

Services
Preceding station	Hangzhou Metro	Following station
Xingmin towards West Guihua Road or Shuangpu	Line 6	Expo Center towards Goujulong
Citizen Center towards Wushan Square	Line 7	Xingyi towards Jiangdong'er Road
Route map
Location

Olympic Sports Center (Chinese: 奥体中心) is a transfer station of Line 6 and Line 7 of the Hangzhou Metro in China. It was opened on 30 December 2020, together with Line 6 and Line 7. It is located in the Binjiang District of Hangzhou, near the Main Stadium and Tennis Center of Hangzhou Olympic Sports Expo Center, which were the main venues of the 2022 Asian Games.

== Station layout ==
Olympic Sports Center station has three levels: a concourse, and separate levels for lines 6 and 7. Basement 2 is for line 7, and basement 3 is for line 6. Each of these consists of an island platform with two tracks.

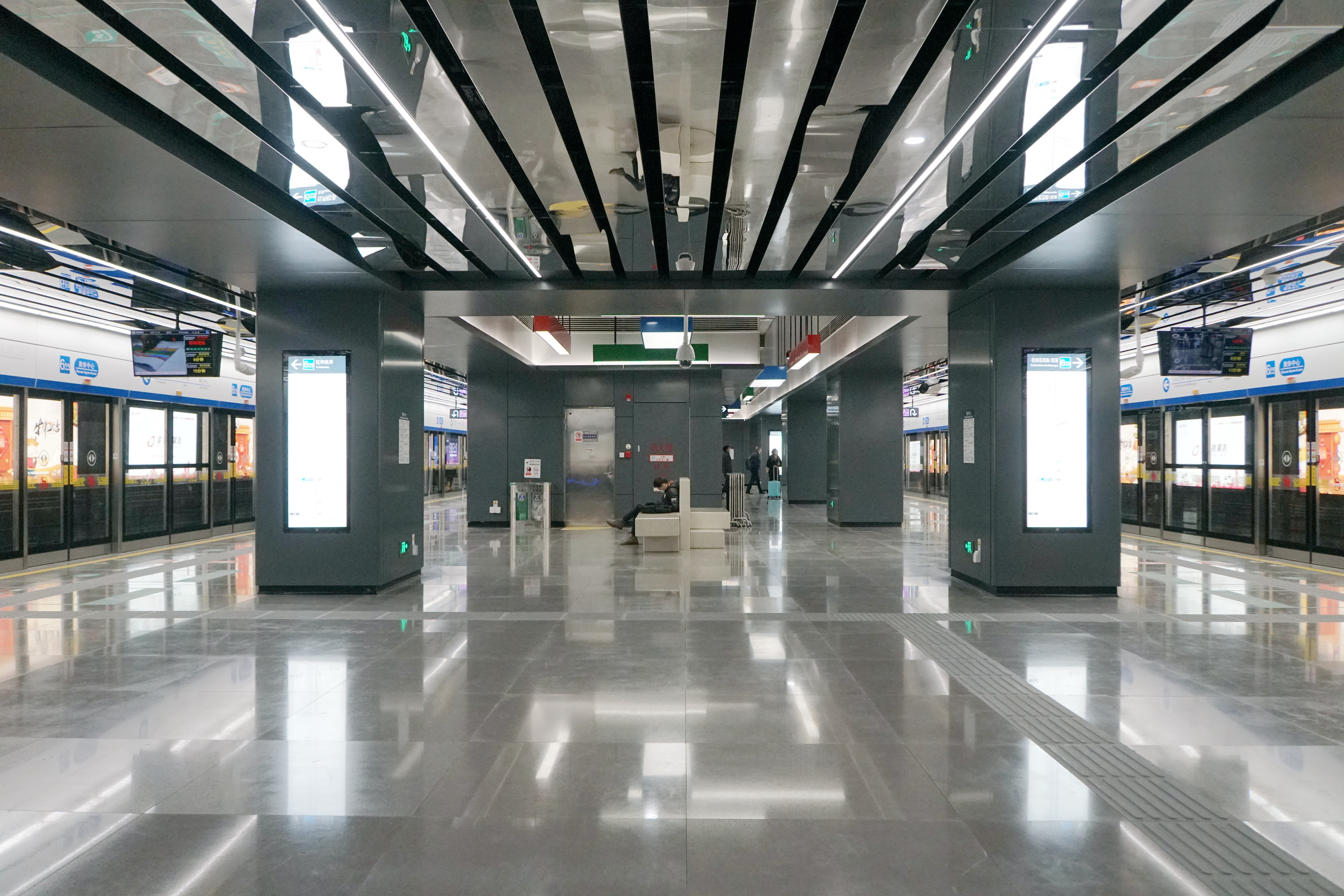
Platforms of Line 6

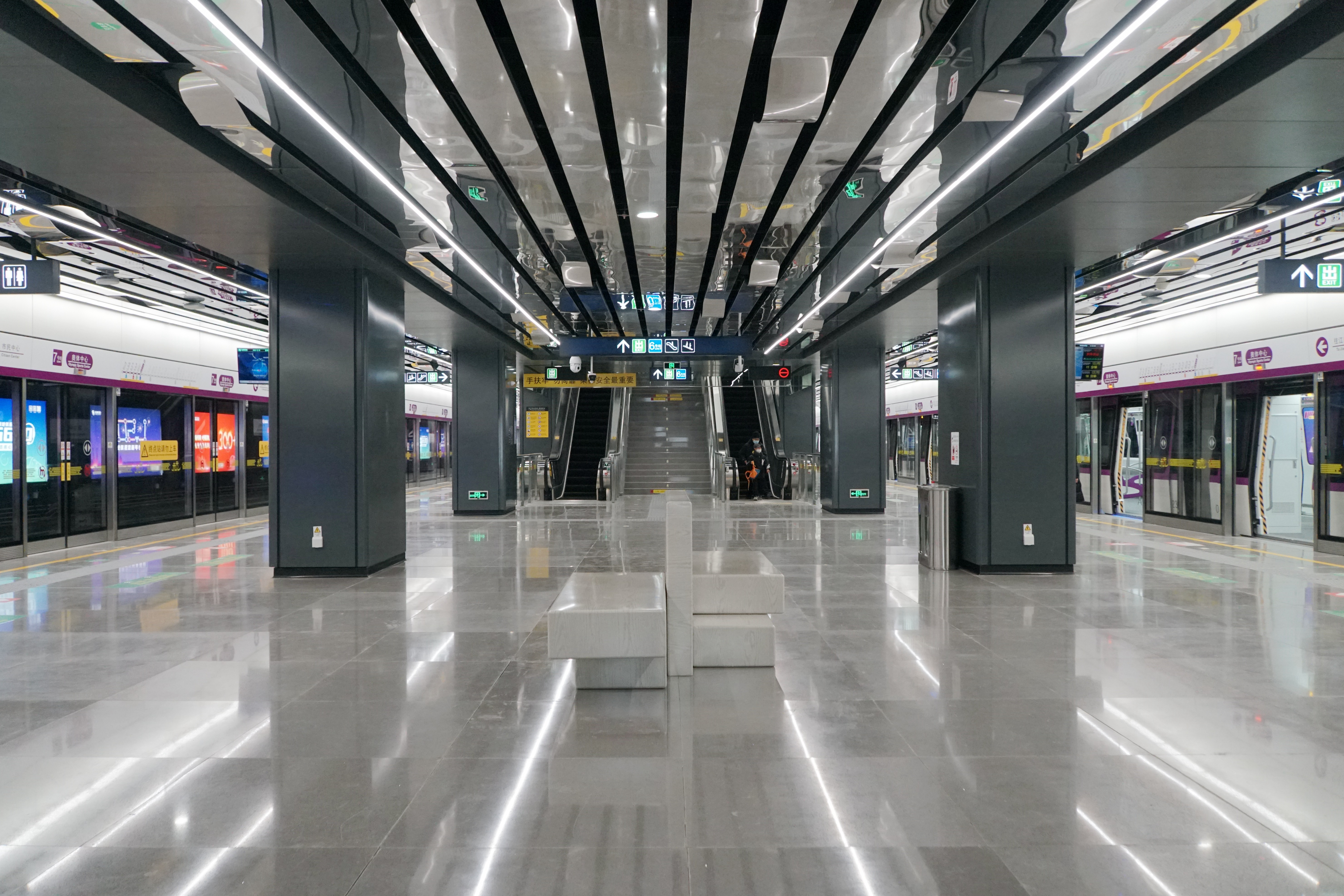
Platforms of Line 7

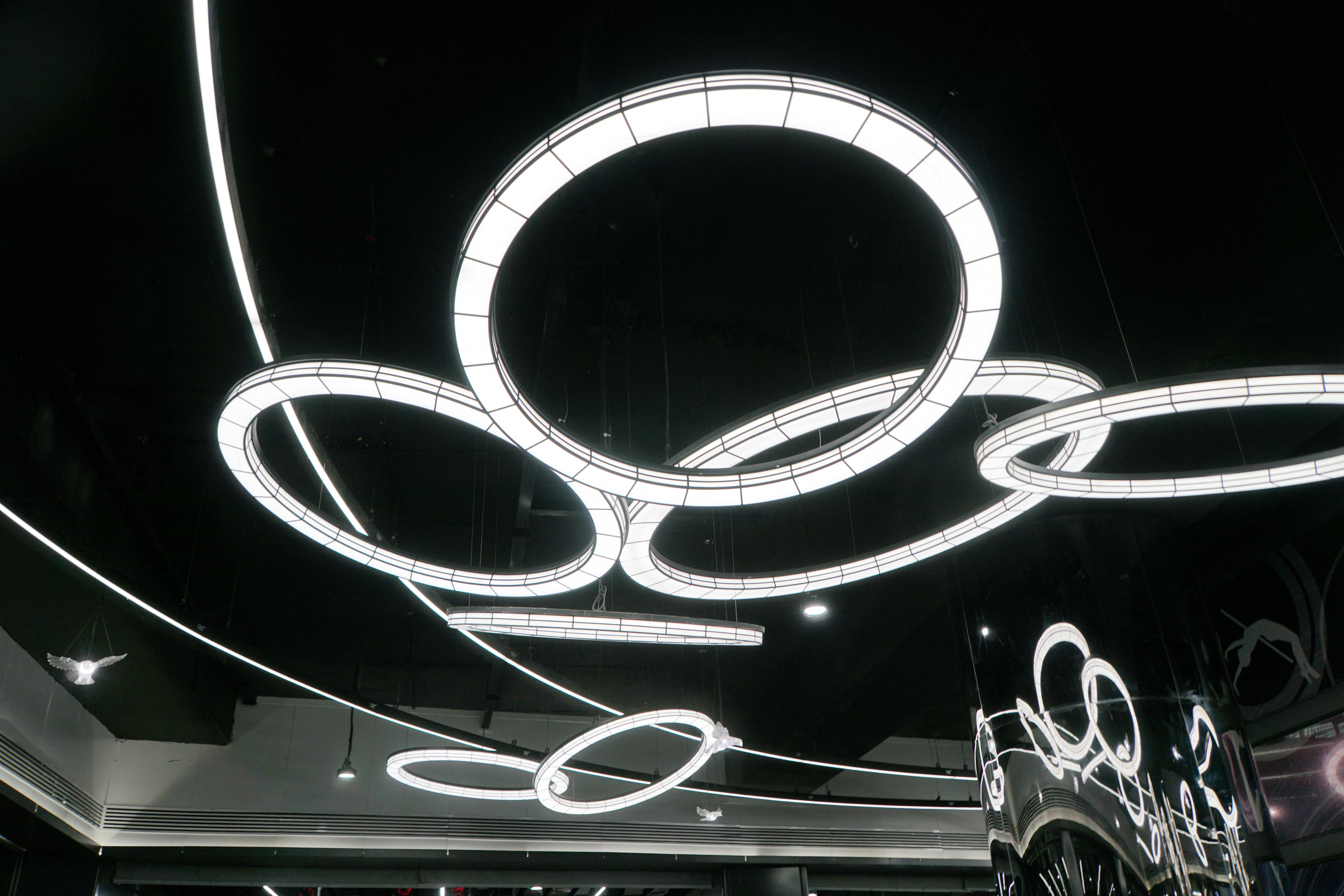
Ceiling

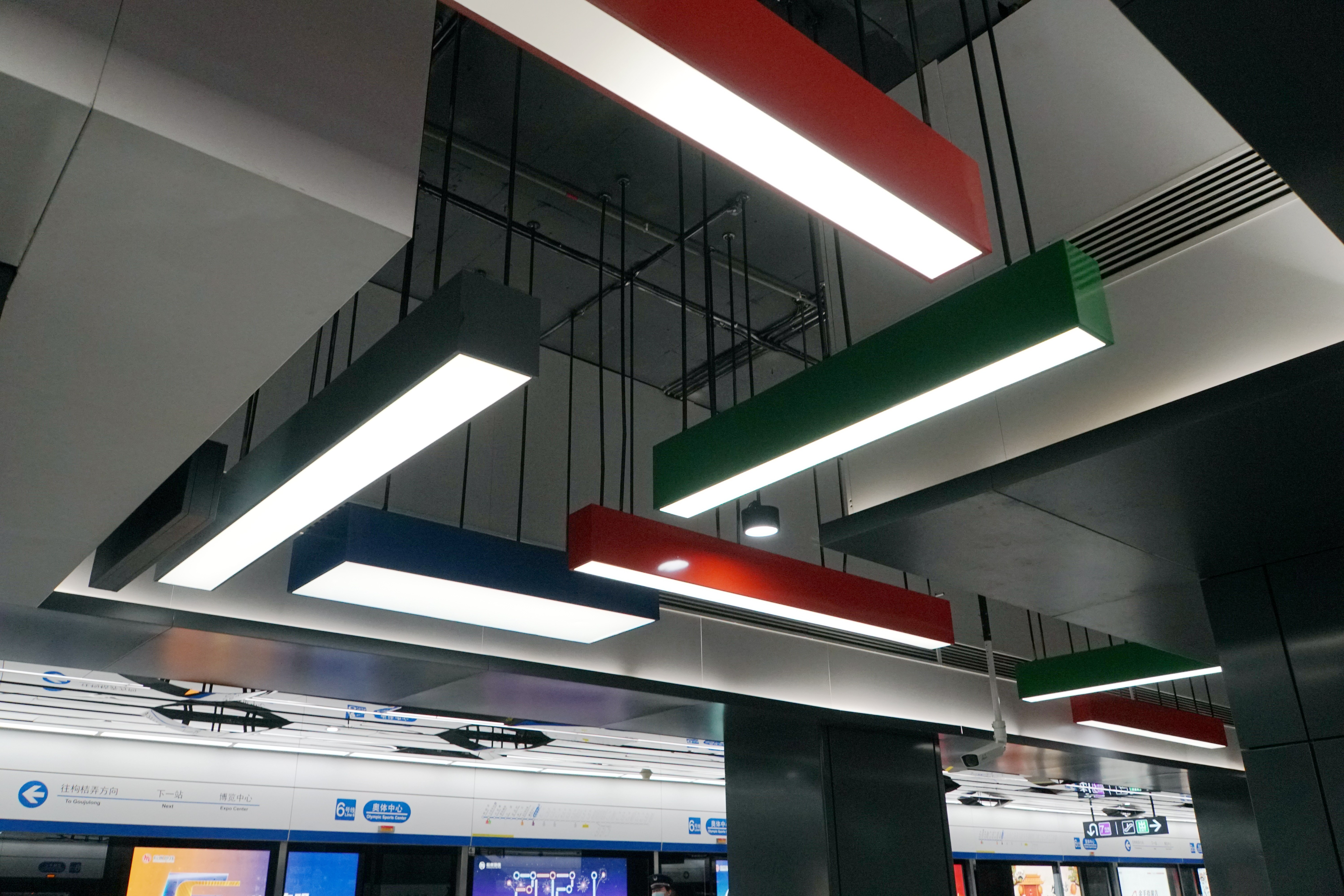
Ceiling

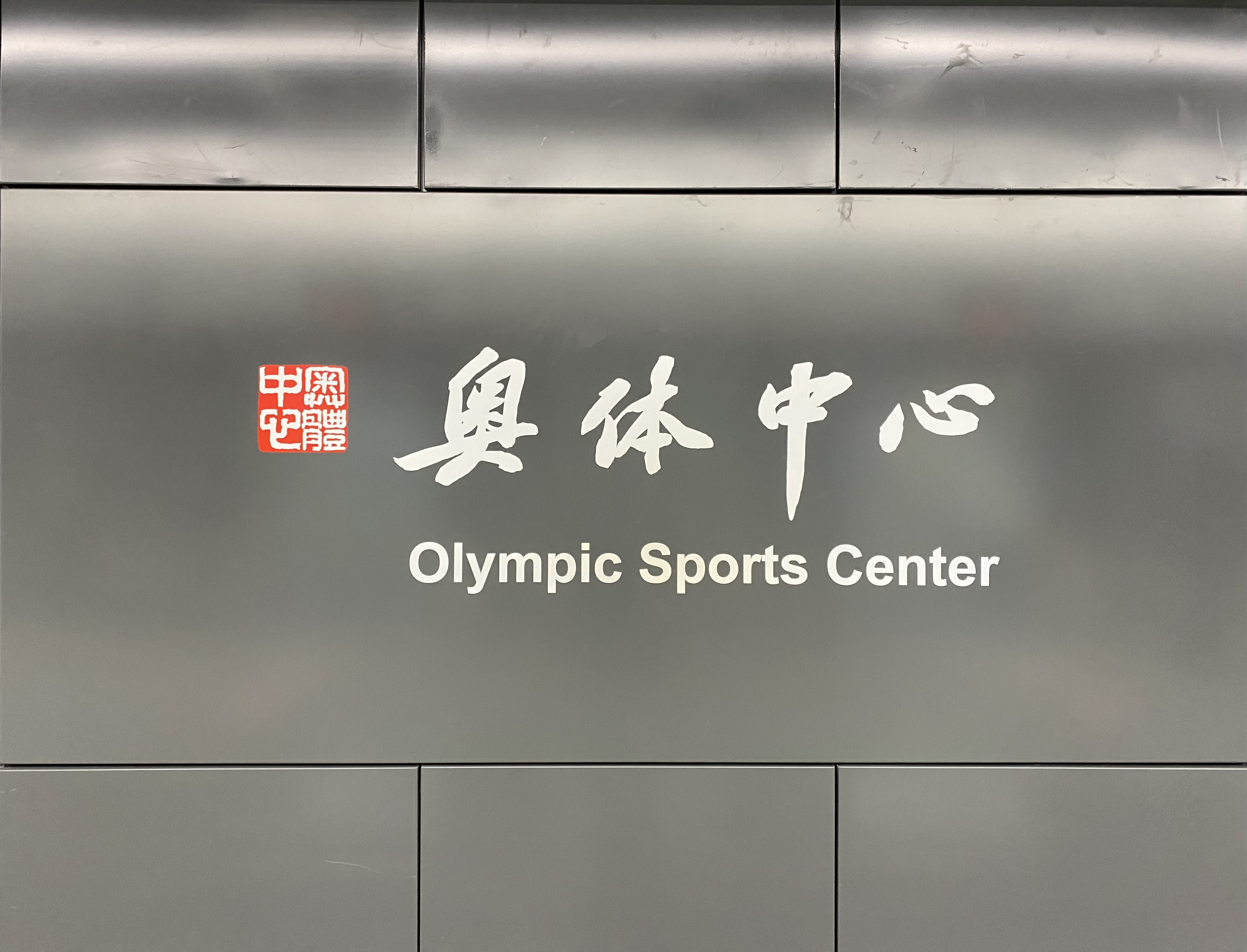
Station in traditional Chinese calligraphy

== Entrances/exits ==
- A: north side of Feihong Road, Benjing Avenue
- B: opening soon
- C: north side of Feihong Road
- D1: south side of Feihong Road, Danfeng Road
- D2: Hangzhou Olympic Expo Center (Tennis Center, Main Stadium)
- D3: Hangzhou Olympic Expo Center (Tennis Center, Main Stadium)
- D4: Hangzhou Olympic Expo Center (Tennis Center, Main Stadium)
- D5: south side of Feihong Road, Binsheng Road
- E: south side of Feihong Road
- F: south side of Feihong Road, west side of Qijiazha Alley
- G: west side of Qijiazha Alley, south side of Feihong Road
- H1: west side of Qijiazha Alley, Yangfan Road
- H2: east side of Qijiazha Alley, Yangfan Road
- J1 & J2: east side of Qijiazha Alley, south side of Feihong Road
- K: south side of Feihong Road, east side of Qijiazha Alley
