= Fengbei station =

Metro station in China

Fengbei 丰北
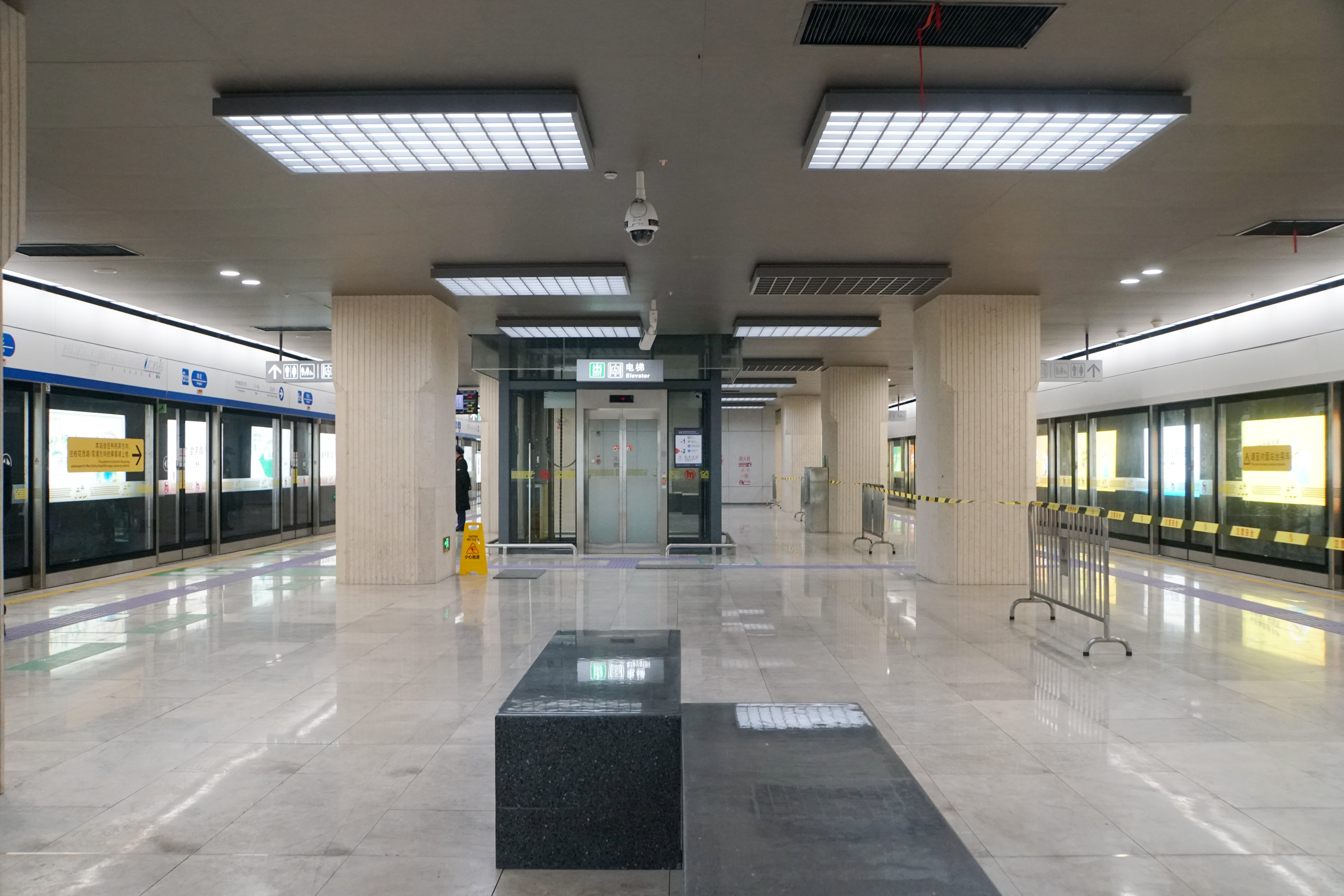
- Platform towards Goujulong

General information
- Location: Pinglan Road × Tongwen Road (W); Xiaoshan District, Hangzhou, Zhejiang; China
- Coordinates: 30.2520605°N 120.2454283°E
- System: Hangzhou metro station
- Operator: Hangzhou Metro Corporation
- Lines: Line 6 Line 11 (planning); Line 15 (under construction)
- Platforms: 4 (2 island platform) (2 in use)

Construction
- Structure type: Underground
- Accessible: Yes

Other information
- Station code: FEB

History
- Opened: 21 February 2023; 3 years ago

Services
Preceding station	Hangzhou Metro	Following station
Qianjiang Century City towards West Guihua Road or Shuangpu	Line 6	Asian Games Village towards Goujulong
Location

Fengbei (simplified Chinese: 丰北; traditional Chinese: 豐北) is a metro station on Line 6 of the Hangzhou Metro in China. It is located at the intersection of Pinglan Road and West Tongwen Road. It opened on February 21, 2023.

The southern part of Qianjiang Century City, where the station is located, is designated for the Hangzhou Qiantang Bay Future Headquarters Base (QBFHB), a future hub for headquarters of major Chinese and international companies. The Fengbei station enables the transfers between for Metro Lines 6, 11, and 15, and will serve as a starting area for QBFHB. As of 2024, the surrounding area is mostly agricultural land, so Fengbei station earned a nickname "The NEW ghost station/The Successor of Caojiawan station".

== Station layout ==
Fengbei has two levels: a concourse, and two island platforms, each one with two tracks. Line 6 uses inner tracks, and the outer tracks will be used for Line 11 in the future.

G	Ground level	Exits
B1	Concourse	Tickets, Customer Service Center, Convenient stores
B2		Future Line 11 tracks
B2	Island Platform, doors will open on the right
B2		← Line 6 towards West Guihua Road or Shuangpu (Qianjiang Century City)
B2		Line 6 towards Goujulong (Asian Games Village) →
B2	Island Platform, doors will open on the right
B2		Future Line 11 tracks

== Design ==
The station is themed around "Riding the Tides" (Chinese: “弄潮”) . The purple, wave-shaped ceiling on both sides of the concourse and the central white linear folding lights resemble the surging tides of the Qiantang River. The walls and pillars of the platform reflect the colors and textures of the tidal flats. The combination of shaped light strips and stainless steel materials is filled with a modern technological atmosphere, aiming to continue the historical essence of the Qiantang River tides while also providing a sense of modernity.

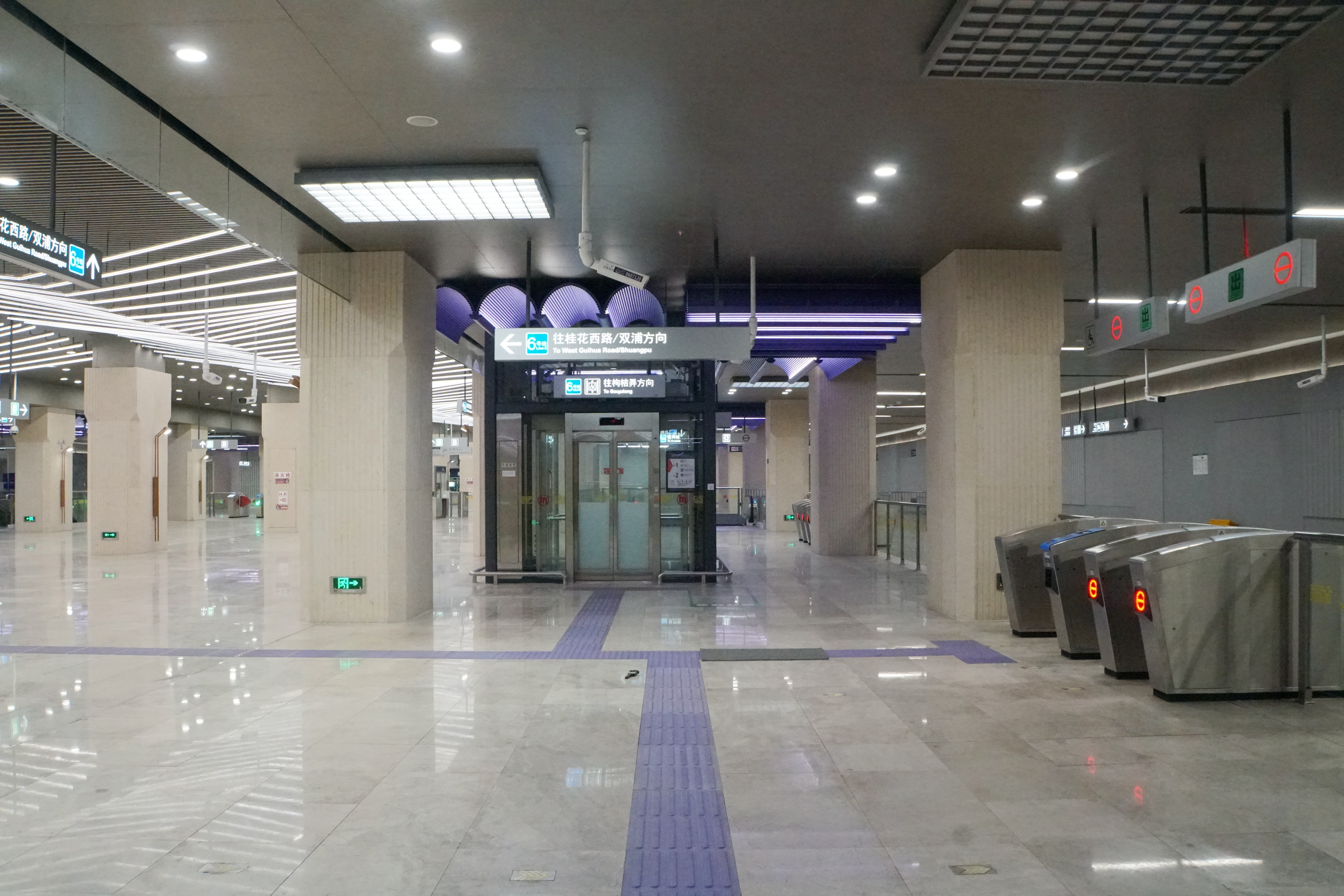
Concourse

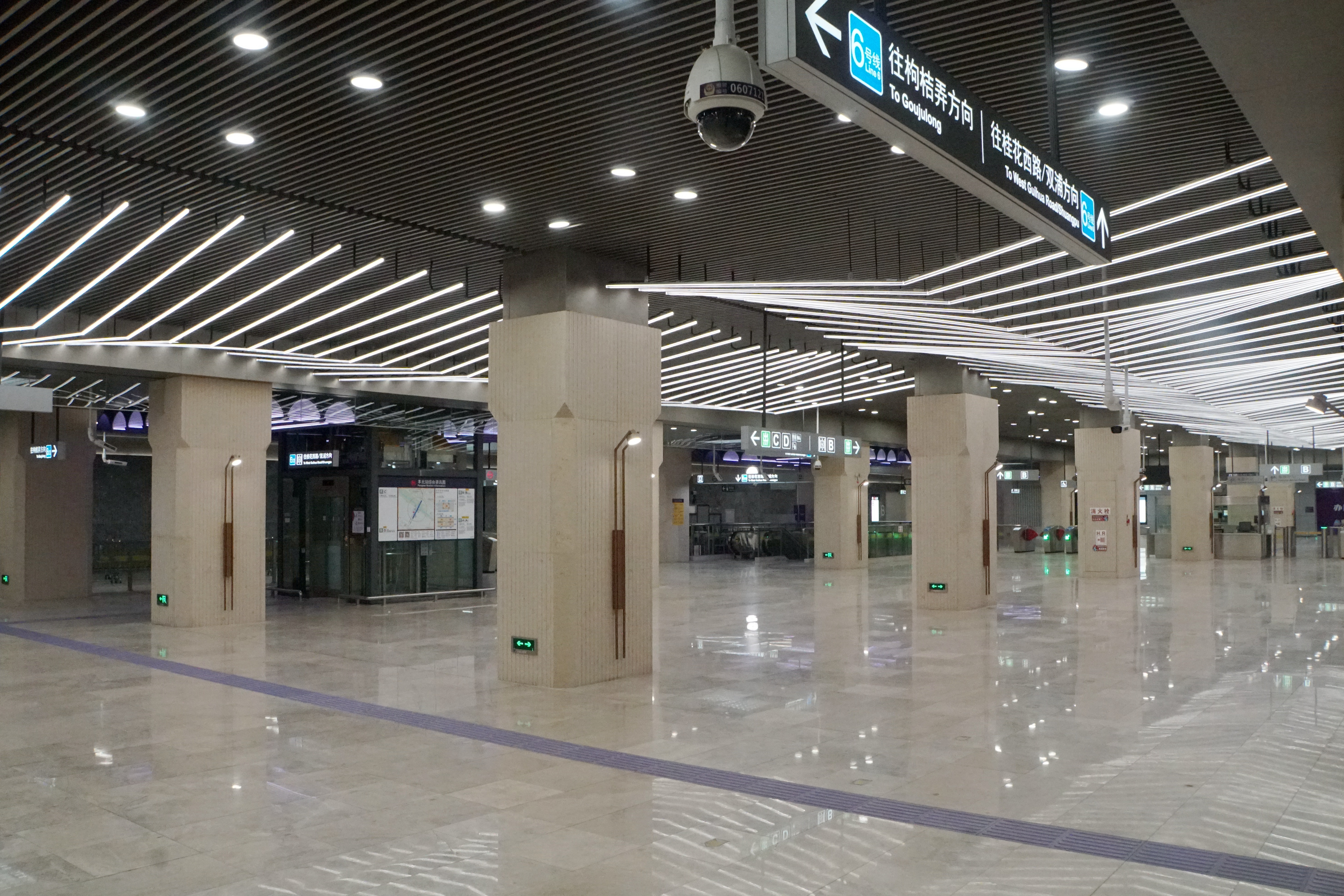
Concourse

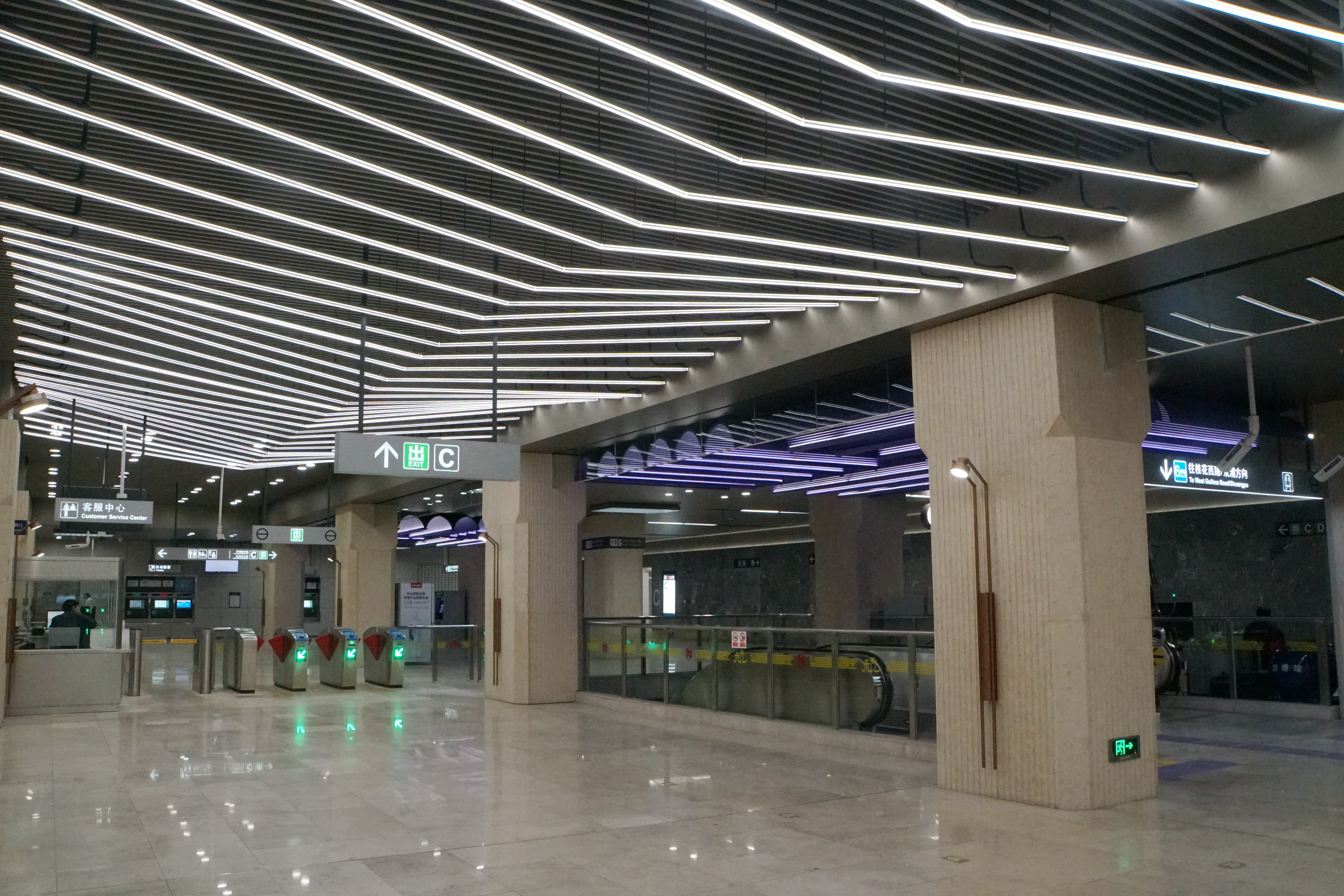
Concourse

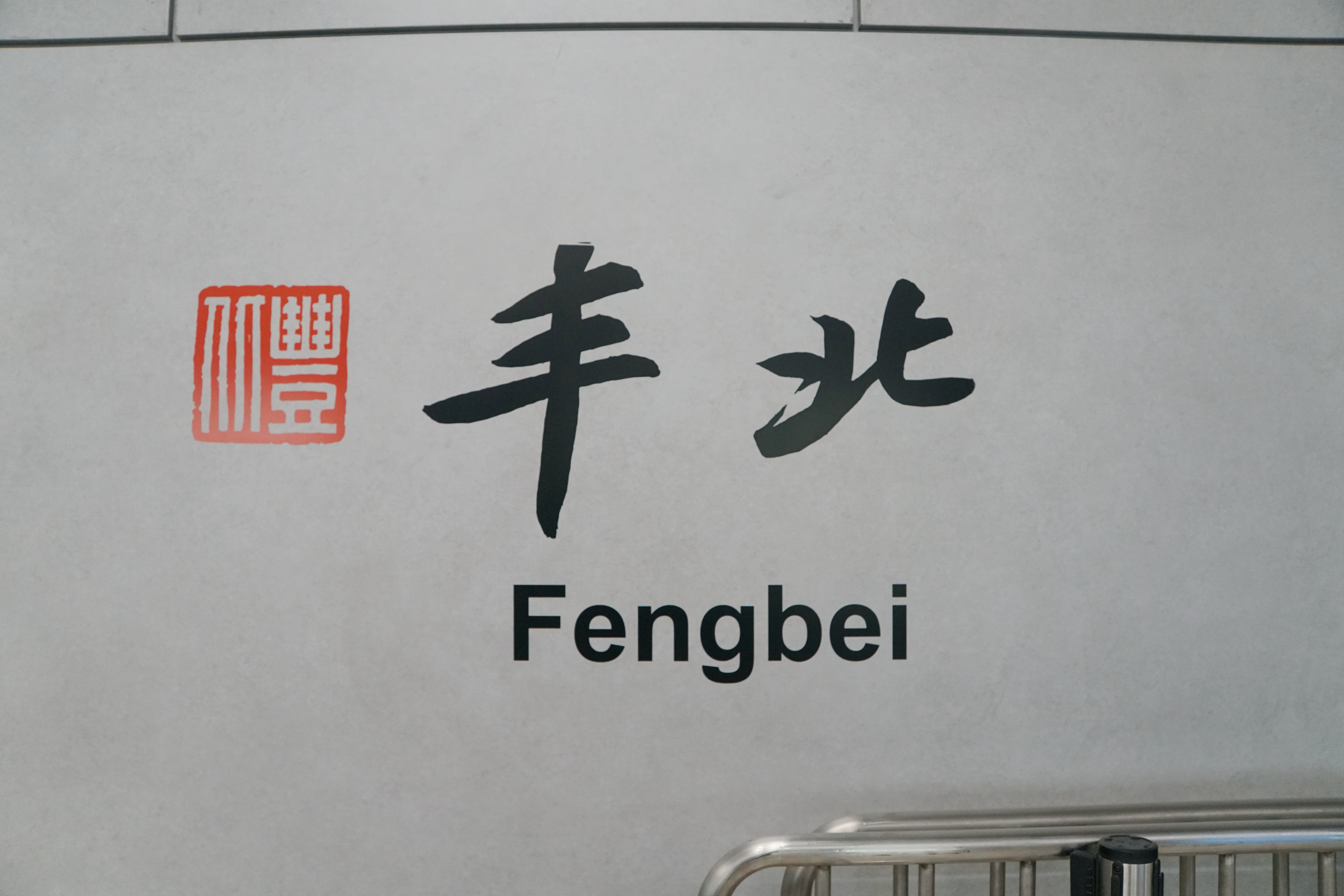
Name board

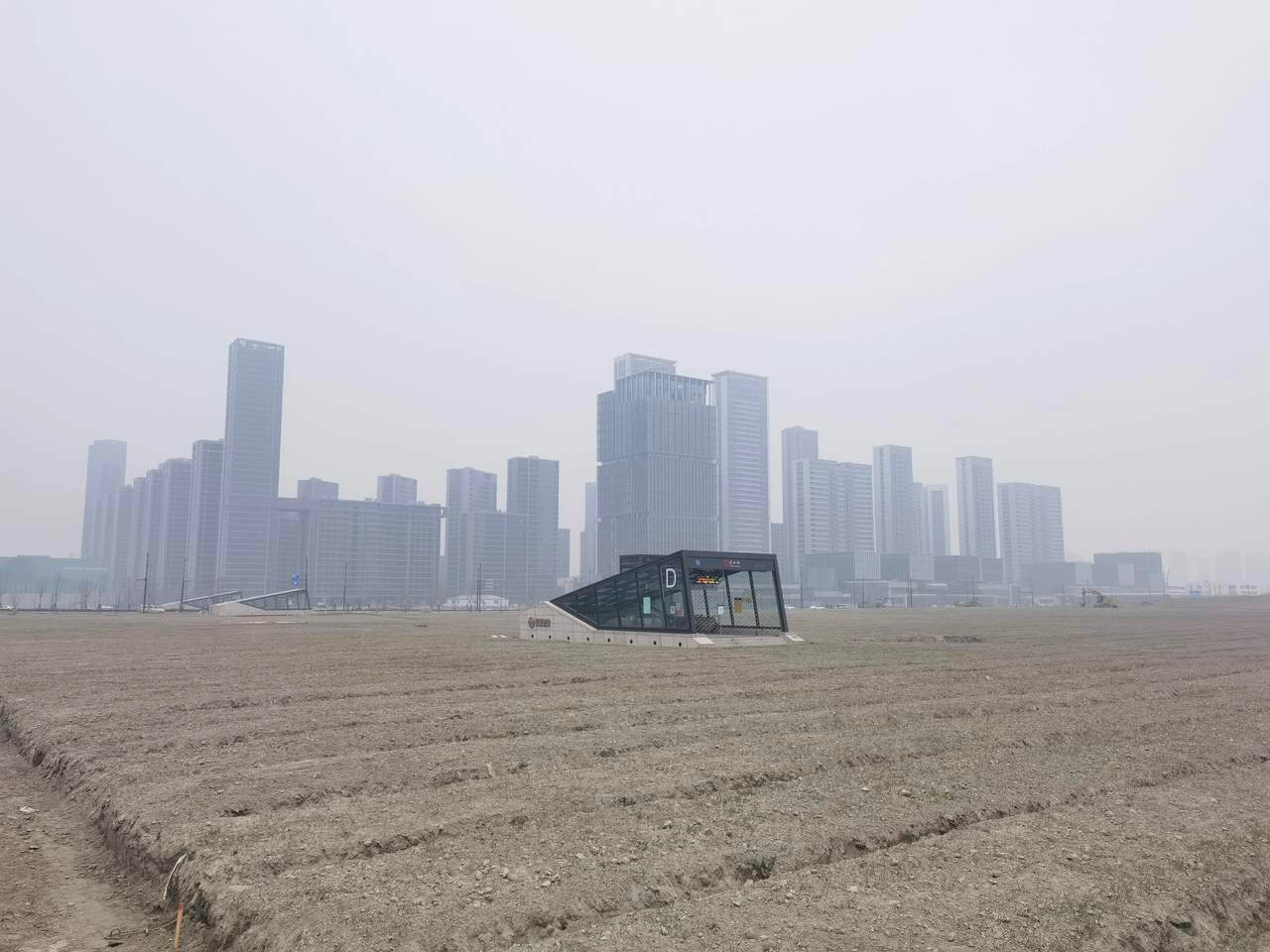
Exit D in 2022

== Entrances/exits ==
There are two entrances in use.

- B1: west side of Pinglan Road, south side of Tongwen Road (W)
- C: east side of Pinglan Road

== Future development ==
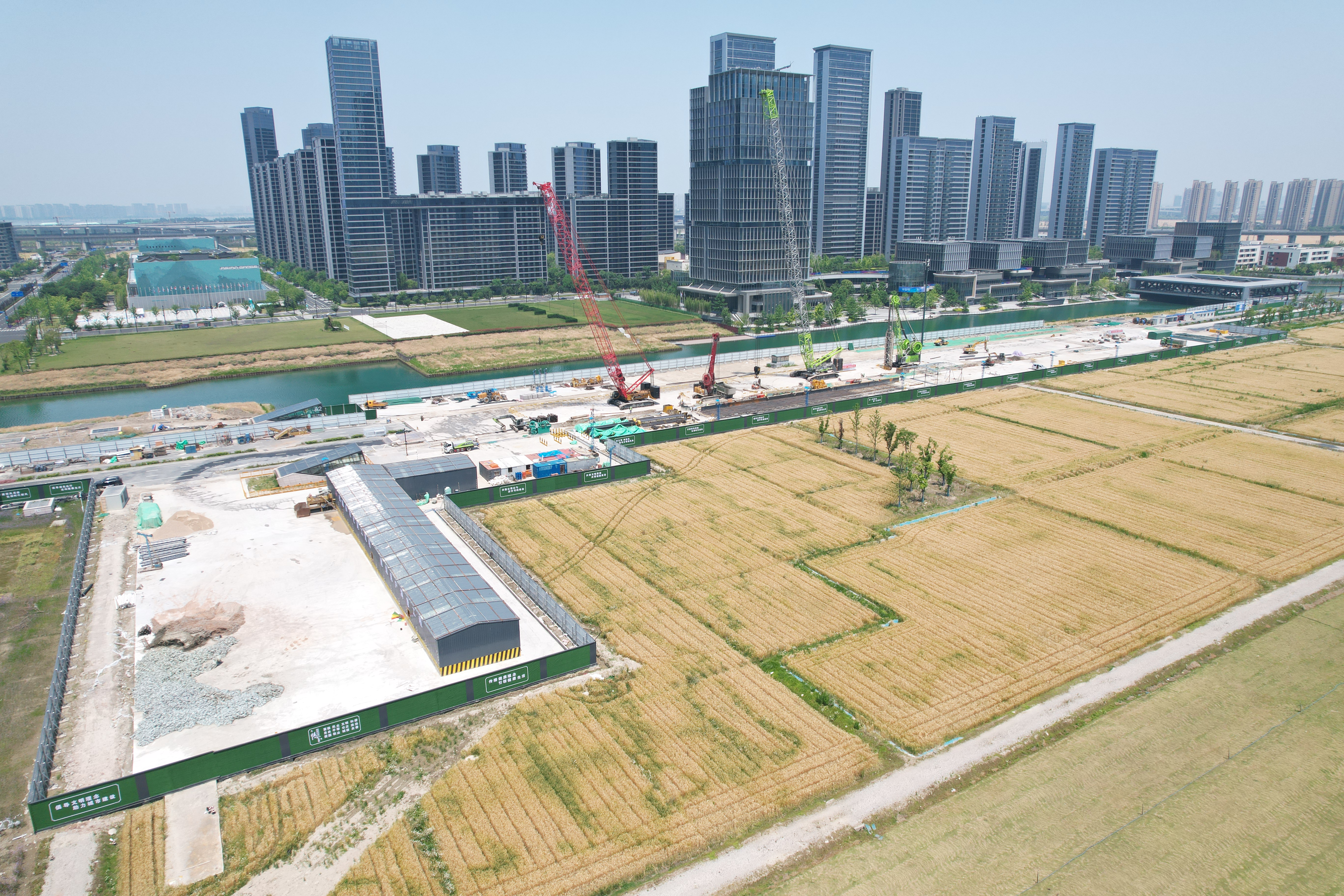
Construction site of Line 15, May 2024

Line 15 will pass the station, which the station is under West Tongwen Road.

== Sources ==
- Su, Yinxin; Wu, Yuzhe; Choguill, Charles L.; Luo, Jiaojiao; Yu, Xiaofen (2024). "Reflections on TOD in China: From land finance to inclusive growth". Journal of Urban Management. 13 (2): 294–307. doi:10.1016/j.jum.2024.01.001. ISSN 2226-5856.
