= Jinshahu station =

Hangzhou Metro station

Jinshahu 金沙湖
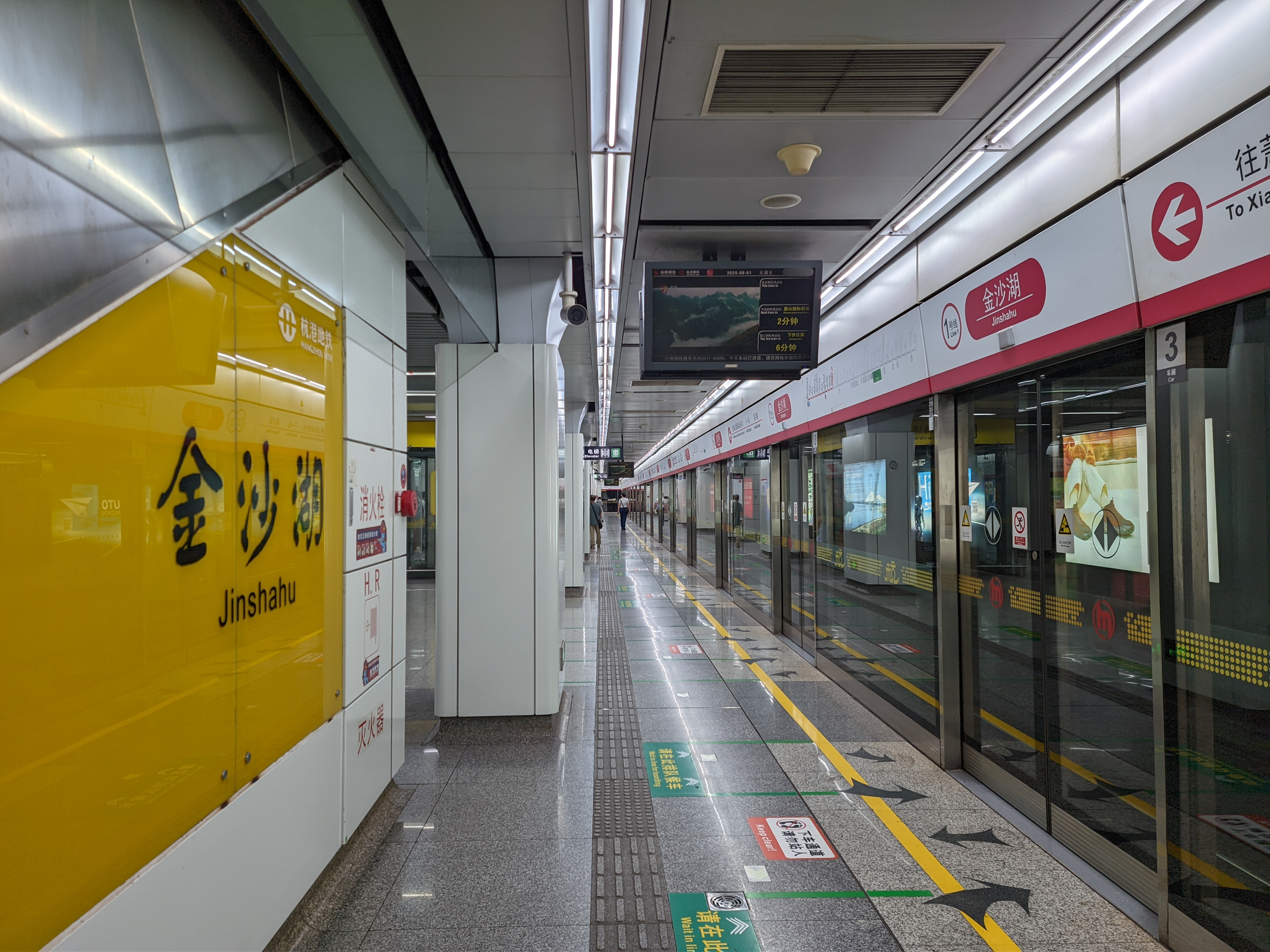
- Platform

General information
- Location: Jinsha Avenue (金沙大道) × Haida Road (S) (海达南路); Qiantang District, Hangzhou, Zhejiang; China
- Coordinates: 30°19′N 120°19′E
- System: Hangzhou Metro
- Operated by: Hangzhou MTR Corporation
- Line: Line 1
- Platforms: 2 (1 island platform)

Construction
- Structure type: Underground
- Accessible: Yes

History
- Opened: 24 November 2012

Services
Preceding station	Hangzhou Metro	Following station
West Xiasha towards Xianghu	Line 1	Gaosha Road towards Xiaoshan International Airport
Location

Jinshahu (Chinese: 金沙湖) is a station on Line 1 of the Hangzhou Metro in China. It was opened in November 2012, together with the rest of the stations on Line 1. It is located in the Qiantang District of Hangzhou.

== Description ==
Jinshahu has two levels: a concourse, and an island platform with two tracks for line 1.

An art wall themed "Golden Sands and Emerald Waves" (Chinese: 金沙碧波) is located in the concourse. The base is made of glossy enamel panels, and the three layers of shallow reliefs are separately sculpted and painted — the lowest layer depicts azure lake water and ripples; the middle layer shows people living along the shores of Golden Sands Lake; and the top layer features shimmering golden waves.

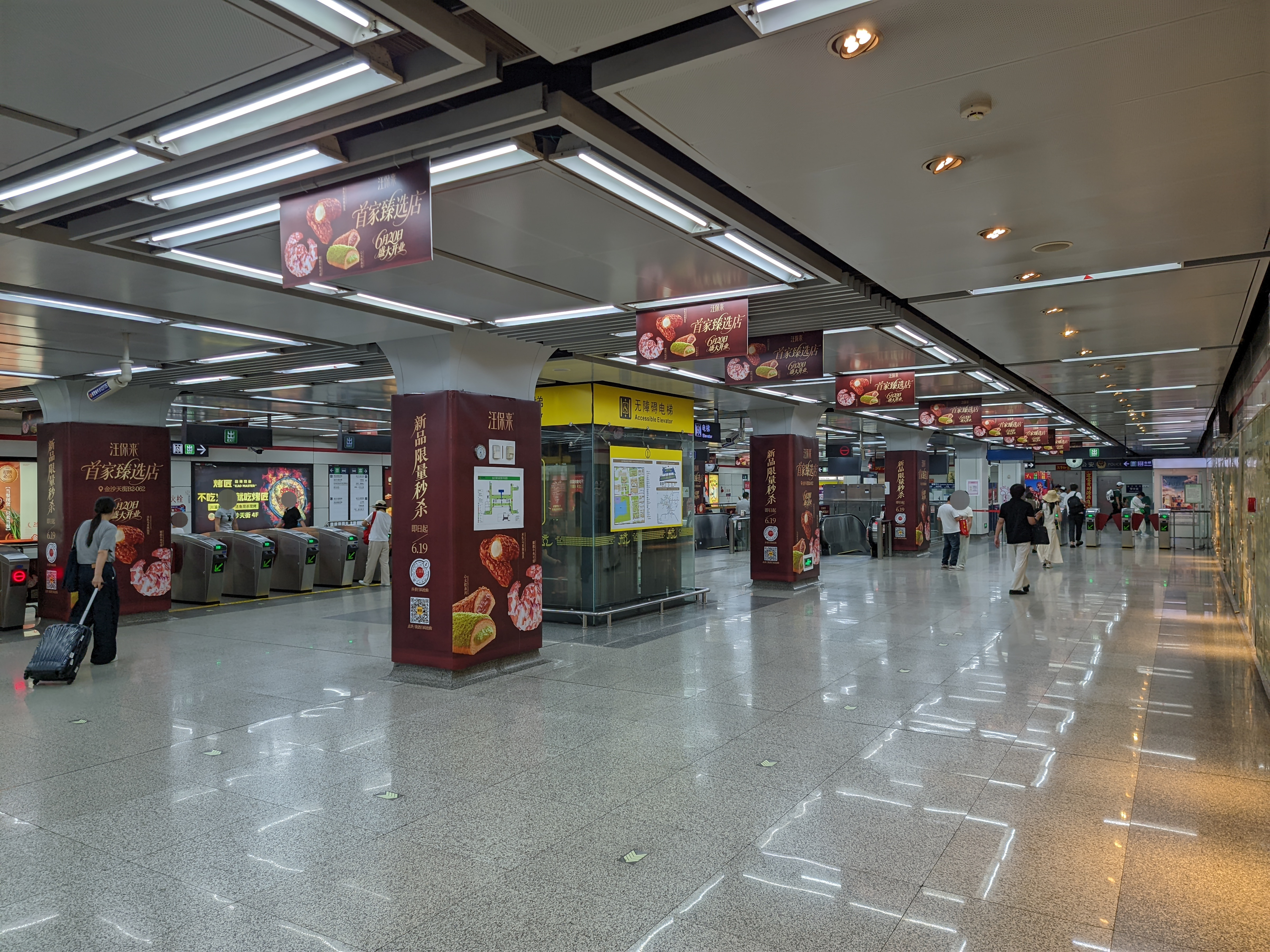
Concourse

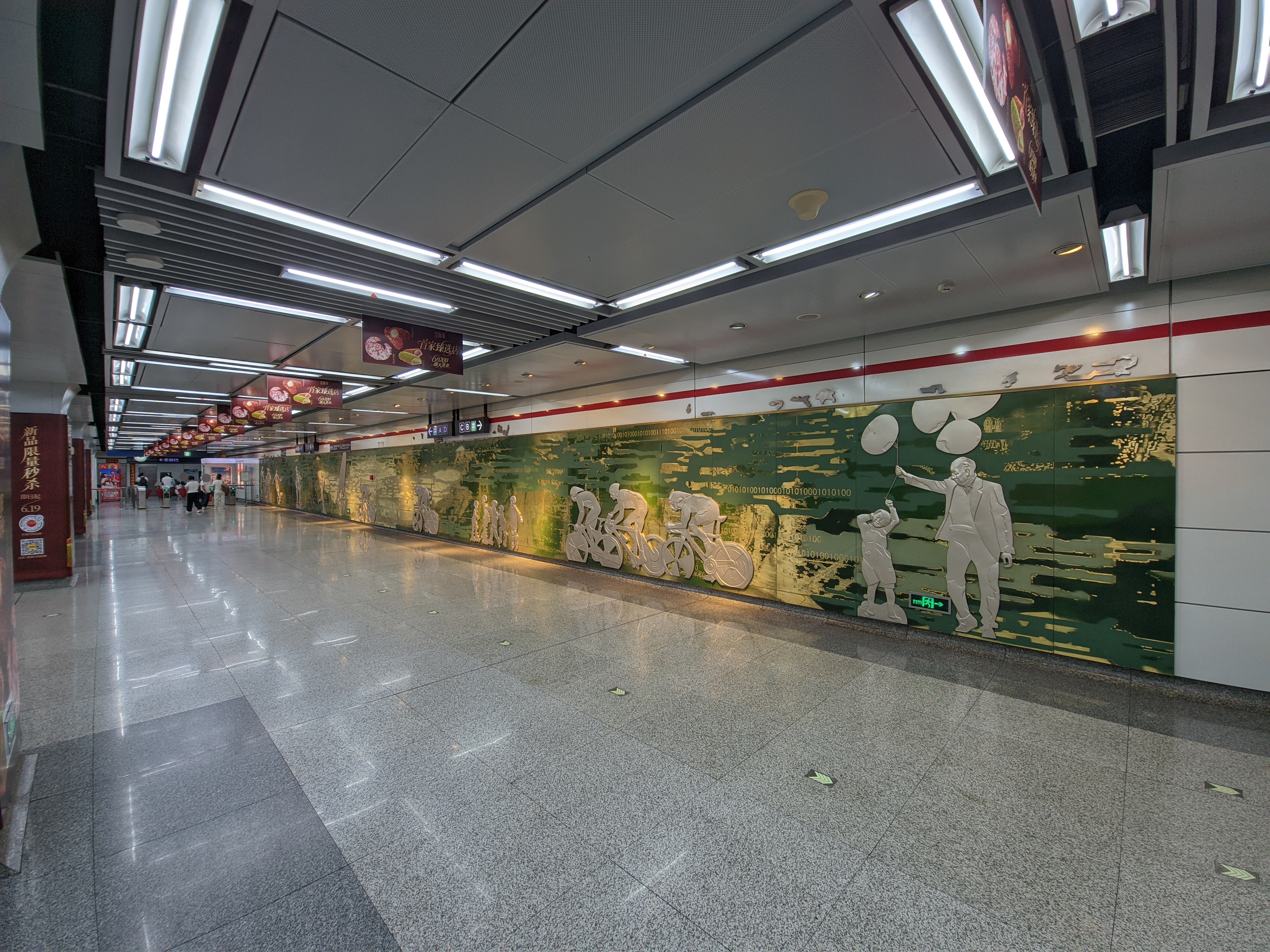
Art wall

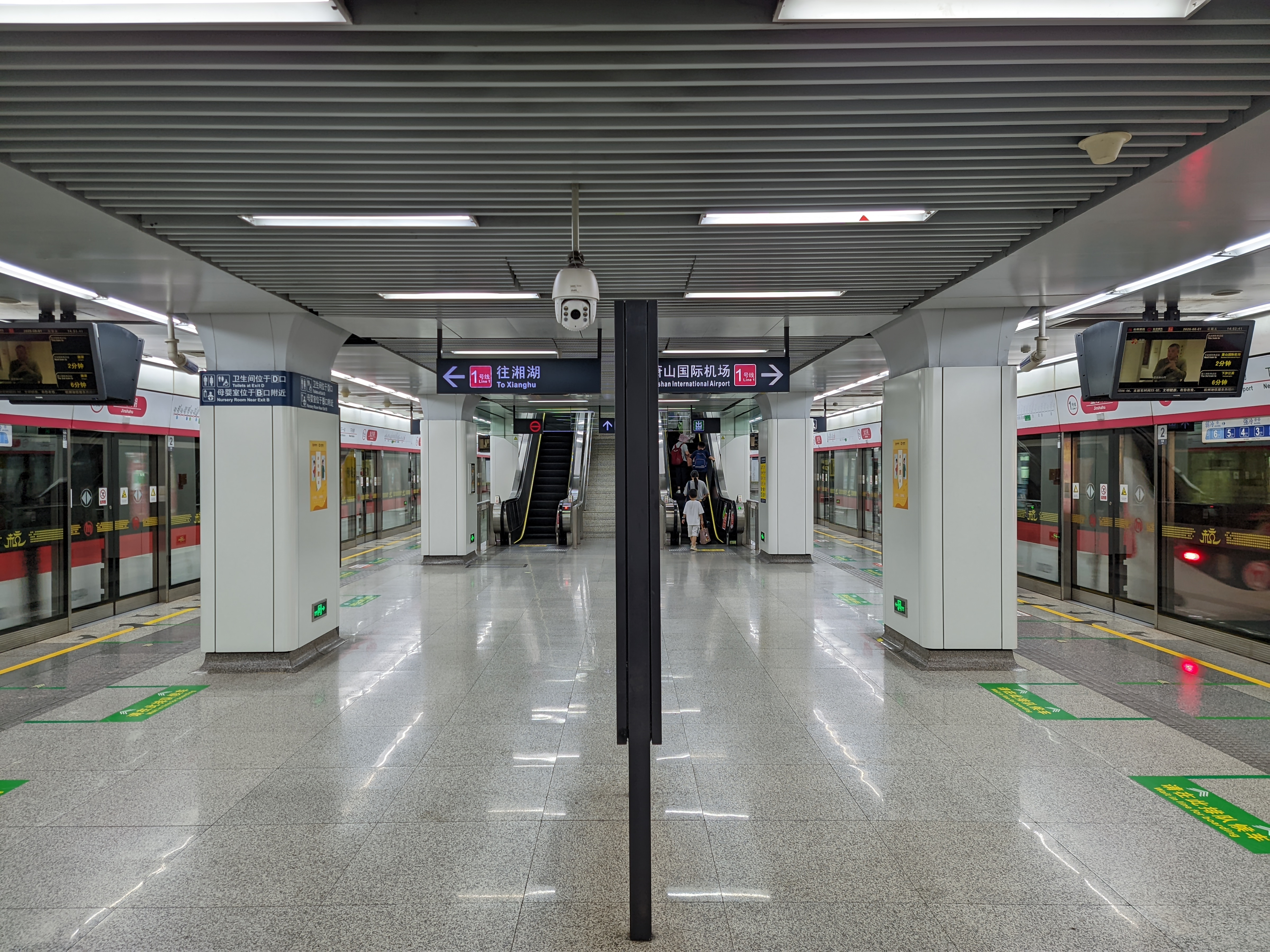
Platforms

=== Entrances/exits ===
- A: Hangzhou Jinsha Paradise Walk
- B: Hangzhou East International Commerce Center
- C: Jinshahu Park
- D: Starlight

== Incidents and accidents ==
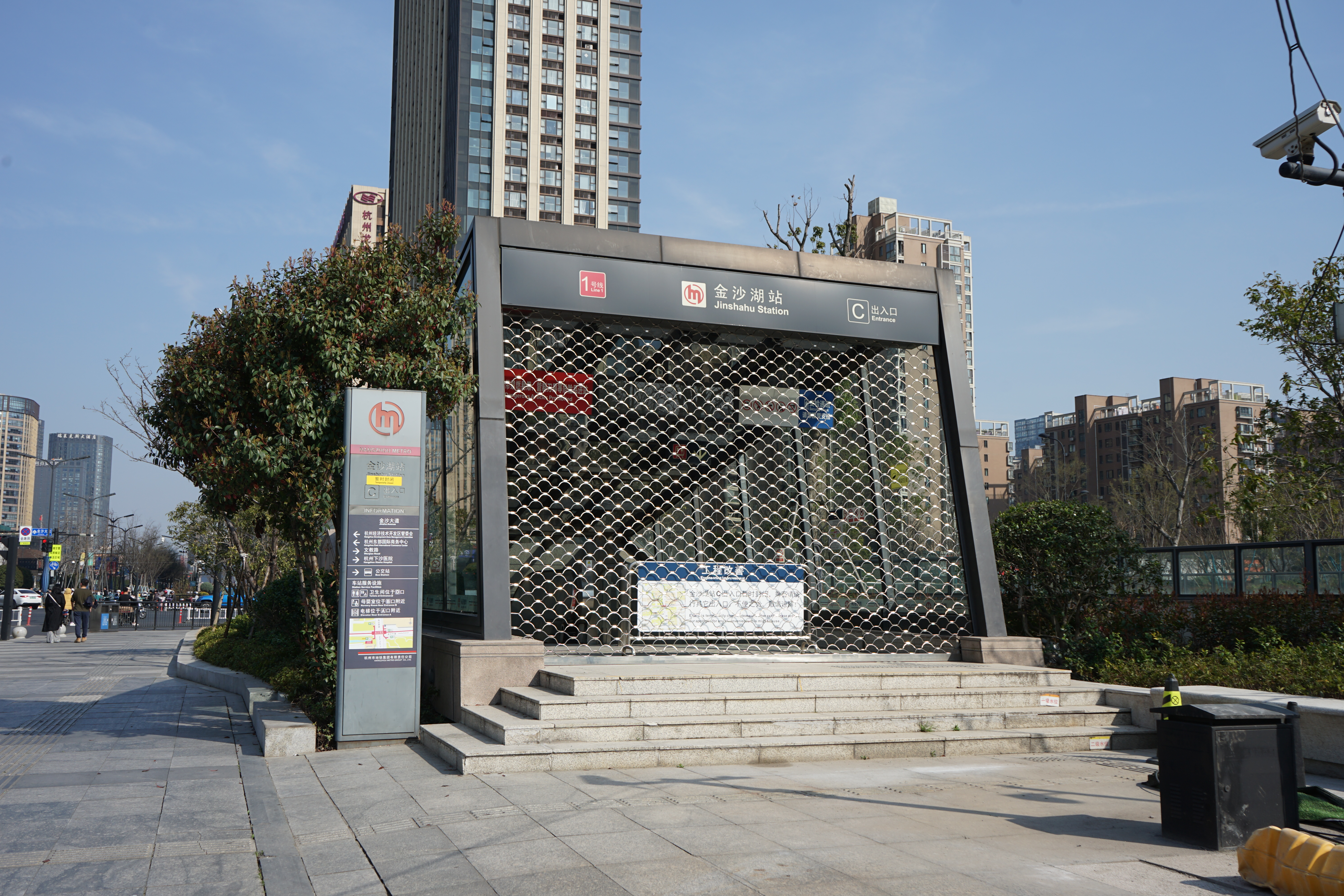
Entrance C in March 2023, which was still closed

At 3:00 p.m. on May 18, 2022, a piping incident occurred the sunken square of Jinshahu Park, causing lake water overflowed in Jinshahu Station. Relevant departments immediately organized emergency repairs, carrying out sealing of the piping and drainage of accumulated water. All personnel on site were safely evacuated, and no one was trapped. Due to the incident, Jinshahu Station was temporarily bypassed by trains. Line 1 adjusted its service routes by operating in segmented sections between Xianghu–West Xiasha, Xianghu–Jiuhe Road, and Wenze Road–Xiaoshan International Airport. The Qiantang Bus Company under Hangzhou Public Transport Group dispatched 20 buses to the nearby metro stations to assist in passenger evacuation and shuttle services.

Train services at was resumed at 5:30 p.m. the following day; however, Exit C, which is closest to the incident site, has remained closed for an extended period.
