= Wenze Road station =

Hangzhou Metro station

Wenze Road 文泽路
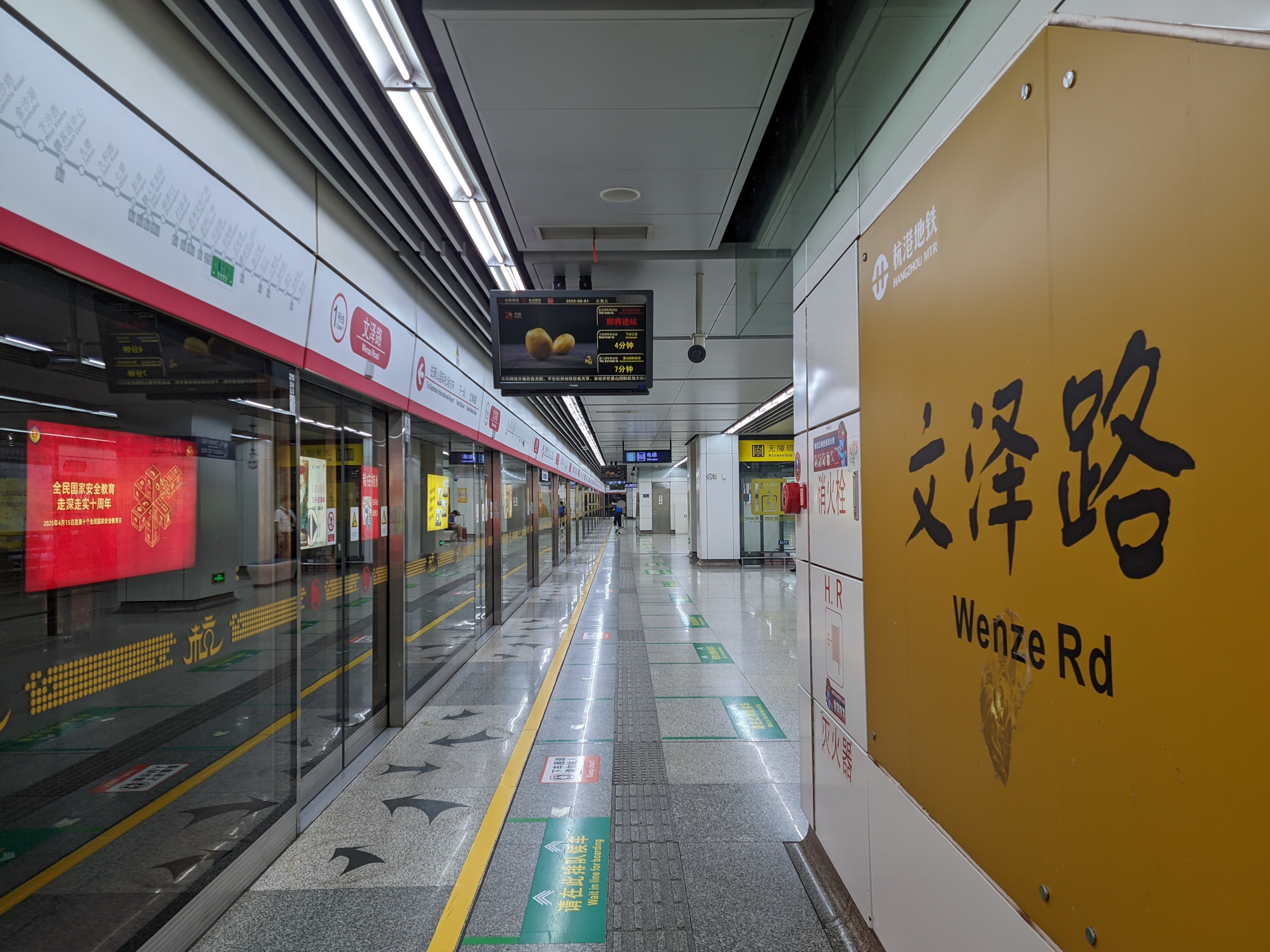
- Platform

General information
- Location: No.2 Street × Wenze Road & No.5 Street; Qiantang District, Hangzhou, Zhejiang; China
- Coordinates: 30°18′44″N 120°20′38″E
- Operated by: Hangzhou MTR Corporation
- Line: Line 1
- Platforms: 2 (1 island platform)

Construction
- Structure type: Underground
- Accessible: Yes

Services
Preceding station	Hangzhou Metro	Following station
Gaosha Road towards Xianghu	Line 1	South Wenhai Road towards Xiaoshan International Airport
Route map
Location

Wenze Road (simplified Chinese: 文泽路; traditional Chinese: 文澤路) is a station on Line 1 of the Hangzhou Metro in China. It was opened in November 2012, together with the rest of the stations on Line 1. It is located in the Qiantang District of Hangzhou.

== Description ==
Wenze Road has two levels: a concourse, and an island platform with two tracks for line 1.

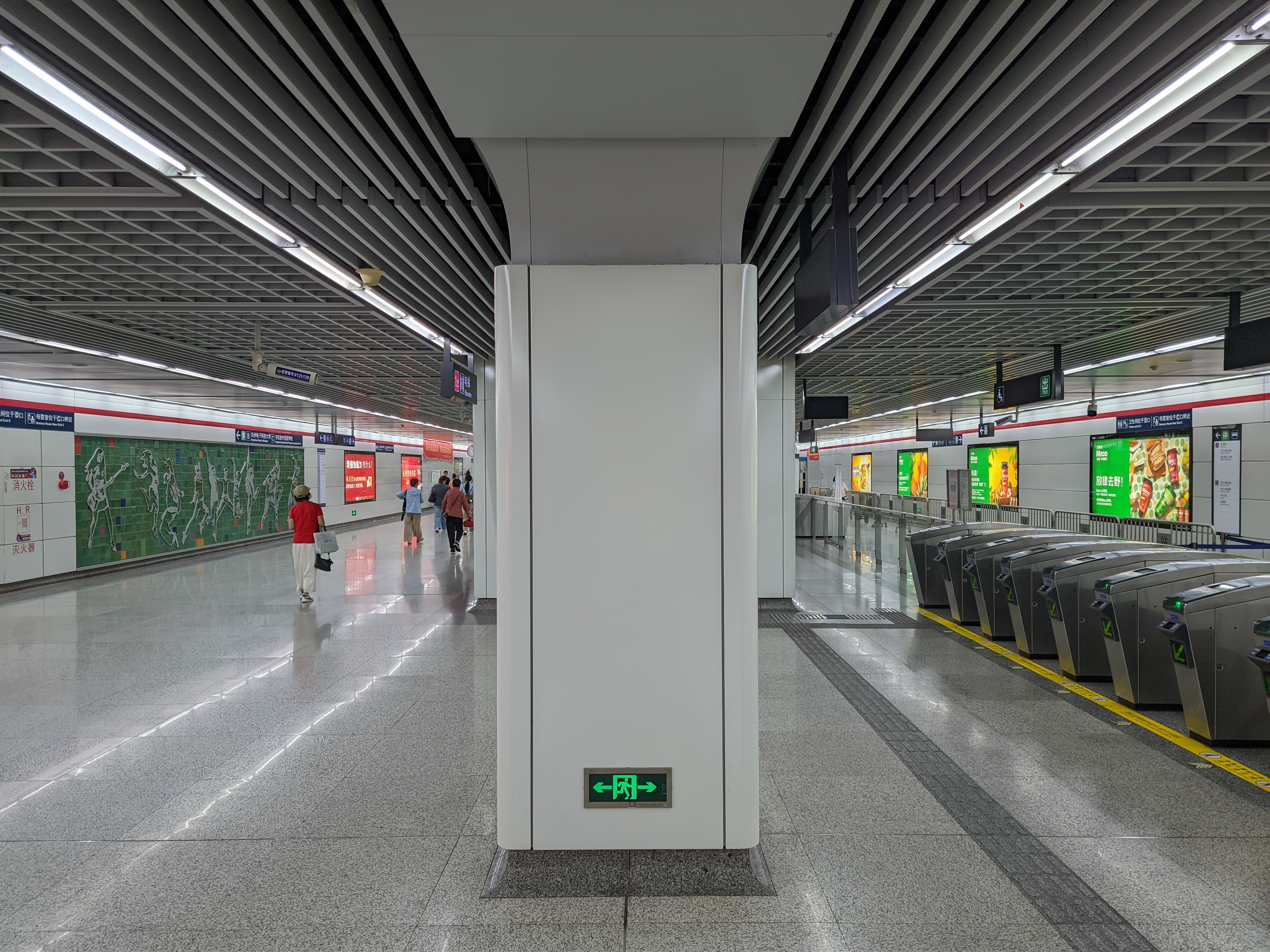
Concourse

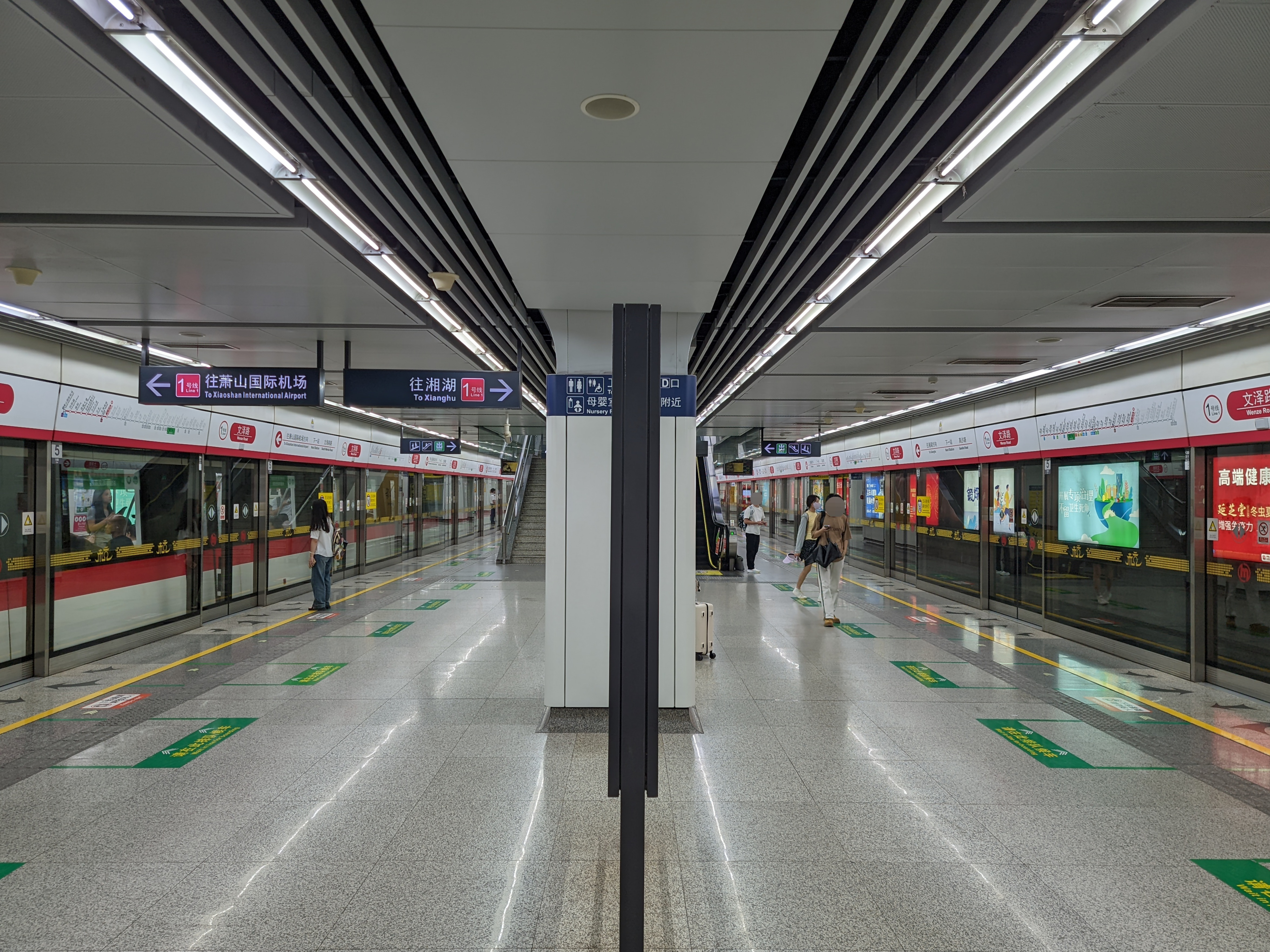
Platforms

=== Entrances/exits ===
- A: Zhejiang Sci-Tech University
- B: Hangzhou Dianzi University
- C: Hangzhou Experimental Foreign Language School
- D: Sixteen Block Mall
