= Yunshui station =

Hangzhou Metro station

Coordinates: 30°18′19″N 120°22′38″E

Yunshui 云水
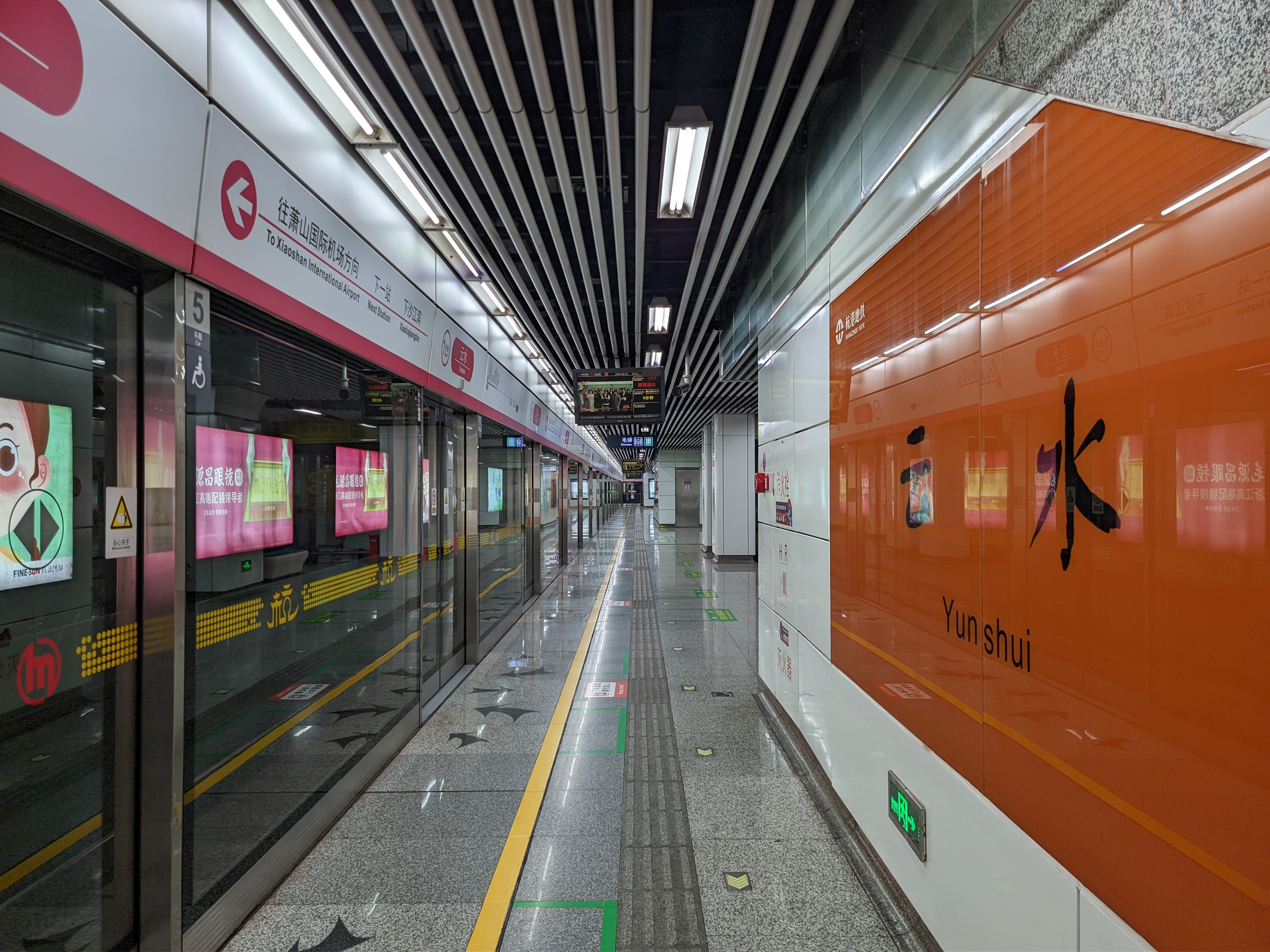

General information
- Location: Qiantang District, Hangzhou, Zhejiang; China
- Operated by: Hangzhou Metro Corporation
- Line: Line 1

History
- Opened: 24 November 2015

Services
Preceding station	Hangzhou Metro	Following station
South Wenhai Road towards Xianghu	Line 1	Xiasha Jiangbin towards Xiaoshan International Airport
Location

Yunshui (Chinese: 云水) is a station on Line 1 of the Hangzhou Metro in China. It was opened on 24 November 2015, together with the expanded section of Line 1. It is located in the Qiantang District of Hangzhou.
