= Xianghu =

Xianghu may refer to:

- Wu Xianghu, a Chinese journalist
- Xianghu Station, Hangzhou Metro, China
- Xianghu, a subdistrict of Furong District, Changsha, China.
