= Coach Center station =

Station of the Hangzhou Metro

Coordinates: 30°18′48″N 120°16′26″E

Coach Center 客运中心
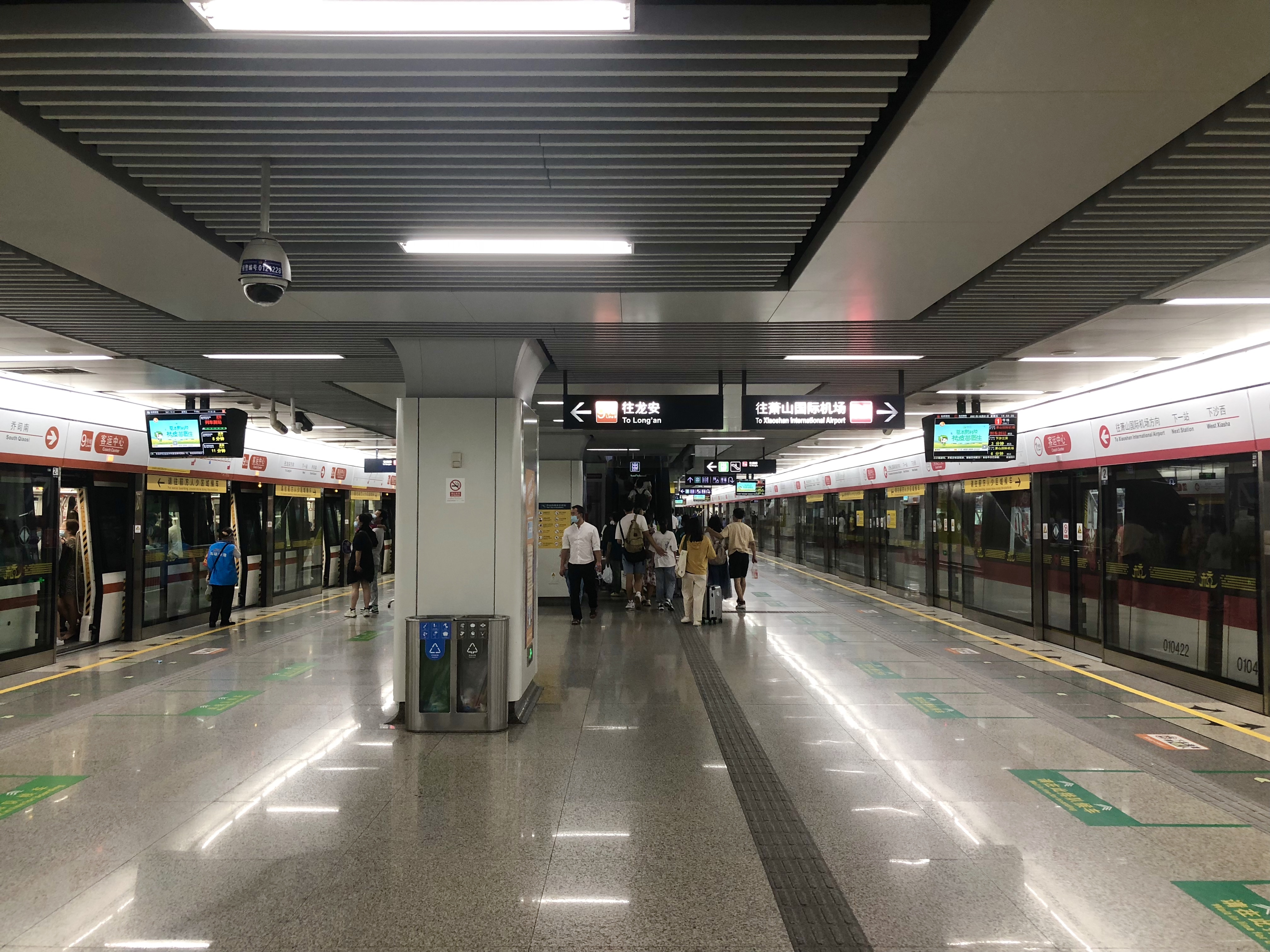
- Platform of Line 9 (left, towards Long'an) and Line 1 (right, towards Xiaoshan Int'l Airport)

General information
- Location: Shangcheng District, Hangzhou, Zhejiang; China
- Operator: Hangzhou Metro Corporation
- Lines: Line 1 Line 9
- Connections: Hangzhou Coach Center

Construction
- Structure type: 2 island platforms, 4 tracks

History
- Opened: 24 November 2012

Services
| Preceding station | Hangzhou Metro | Following station |
|---|---|---|
| Jiubao towards Xianghu | Line 1 | West Xiasha towards Xiaoshan International Airport |
| Jiumu Road towards Guanyintang | Line 9 | South Qiaosi towards Long'an |
Location

Coach Center (Chinese: 客运中心) is a metro station in Hangzhou, China, and is an interchange between Line 1 and Line 9 of the Hangzhou Metro. It is located in the Jianggan District of Hangzhou. It is connected to Hangzhou Coach Center. The metro station opened in November 2012, together with the rest of the stations on Line 1. Line 9 was opened on 10 July 2021 and uses Platform 3 and Platform 4 which was previously used by Line 1 trains to Linping, allowing for same direction cross-platform interchange between the two lines.

== History ==
=== Coach Station ===
Construction on the Hangzhou Coach Center began on 18 December 2003.

=== Metro Station ===
The metro station opened in November 2012, together with the rest of the stations on Line 1. It has become a transfer station between Line 1 and Line 9 after 10 July 2021.
