= Zhalongkou station =

Hangzhou Metro station

Coordinates: 30°17′13″N 120°11′16″E

Zhalongkou 闸弄口
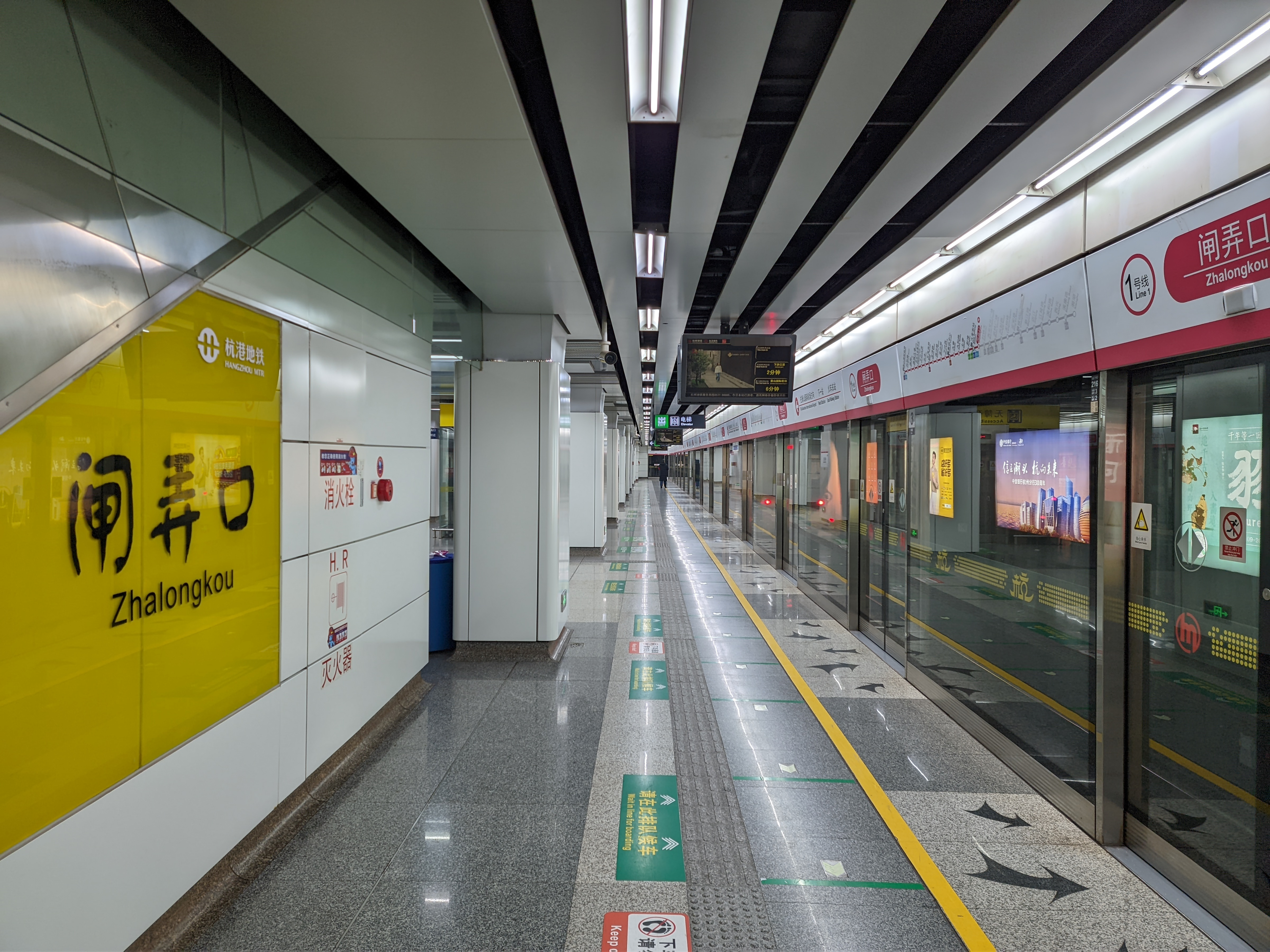

General information
- Location: Jianggan District, Hangzhou, Zhejiang; China
- Operated by: Hangzhou Metro Corporation
- Line: Line 1

History
- Opened: November 2012; 13 years ago

Services
Preceding station	Hangzhou Metro	Following station
Datieguan towards Xianghu	Line 1	East Railway Station towards Xiaoshan International Airport
Location

Zhalongkou (Chinese: 闸弄口) is a station on Line 1 of the Hangzhou Metro in China. It was opened in November 2012, together with the rest of the stations on Line 1. It is located in the Jianggan District of Hangzhou.
