= Gaosha Road station =

Hangzhou Metro station

Gaosha Road 高沙路
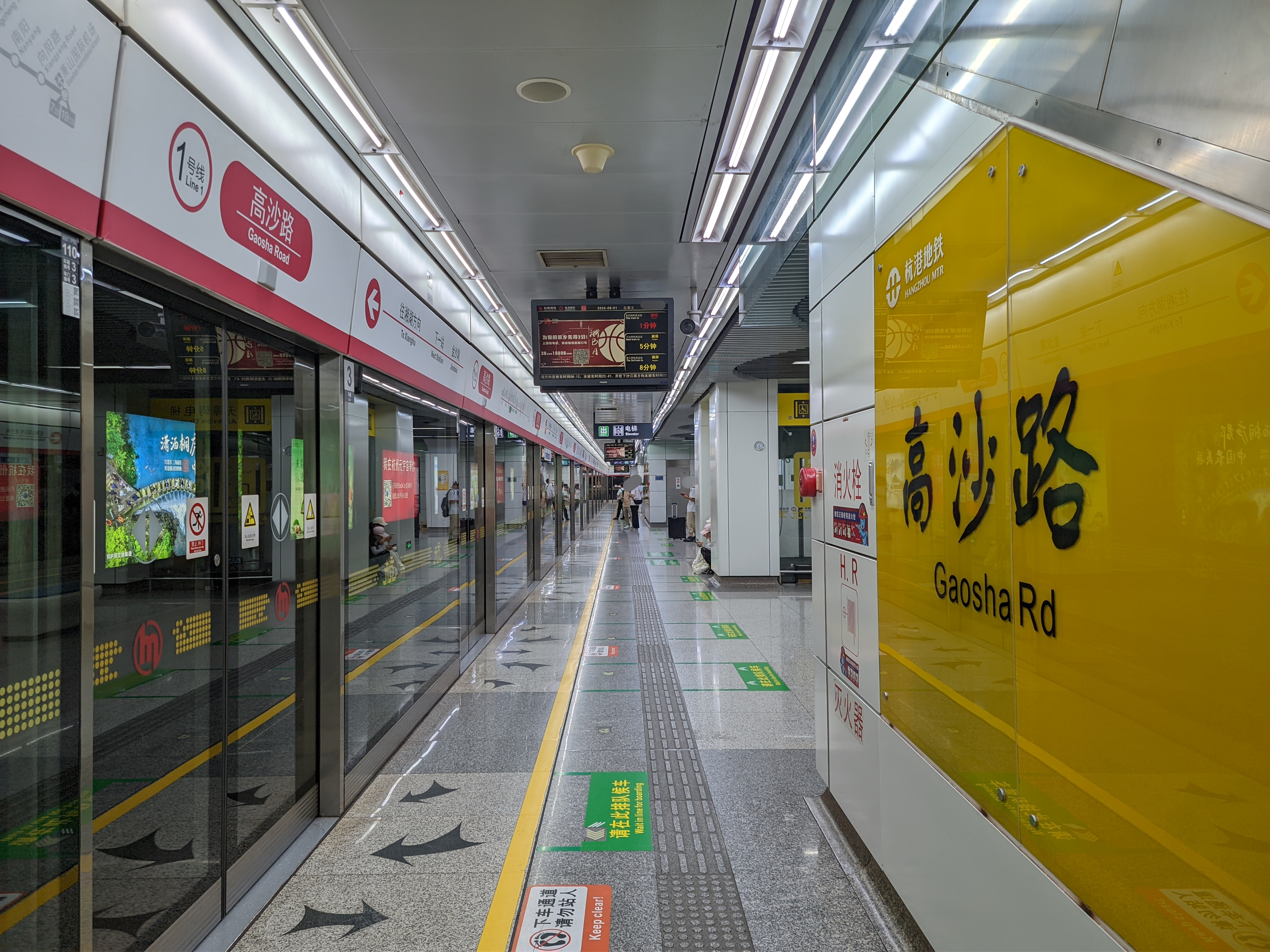
- Platform

General information
- Location: Jinsha Avenue (金沙大道) × Gaosha Road; Qiantang District, Hangzhou, Zhejiang; China
- Coordinates: 30°19′N 120°20′E
- System: Hangzhou Metro
- Operated by: Hangzhou MTR Corporation
- Line: Line 1
- Platforms: 2 (1 island platform)

Construction
- Structure type: Underground
- Accessible: Yes

History
- Opened: 24 November 2012

Services
Preceding station	Hangzhou Metro	Following station
Jinshahu towards Xianghu	Line 1	Wenze Road towards Xiaoshan International Airport
Location

Gaosha Road (Chinese: 高沙路) is a station on Line 1 of the Hangzhou Metro in China. It was opened in November 2012, together with the rest of the stations on Line 1. It is located in the Qiantang District of Hangzhou.

== Description ==
Gaosha Road has two levels: a concourse, and an island platform with two tracks for line 1.

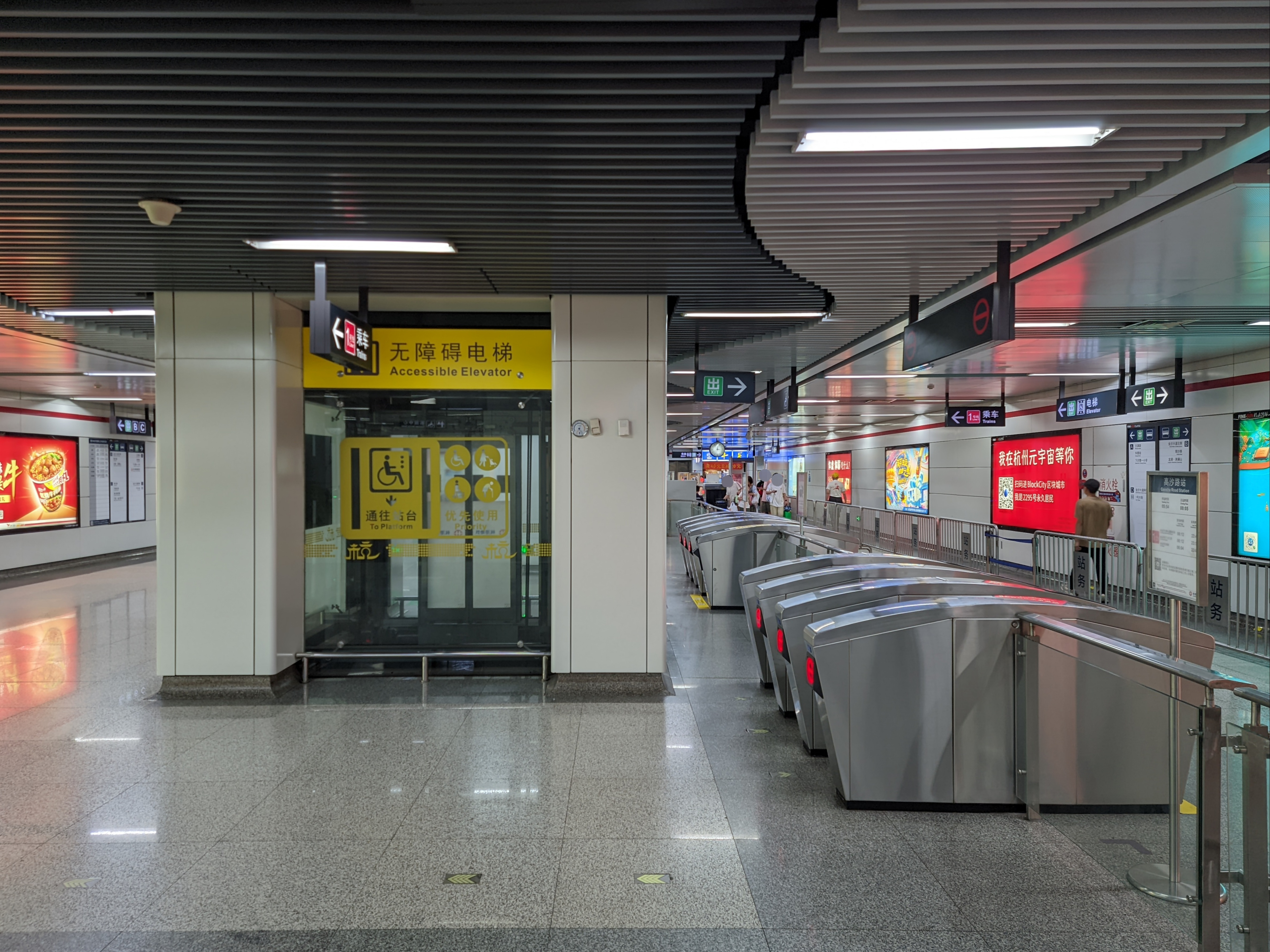
Concourse

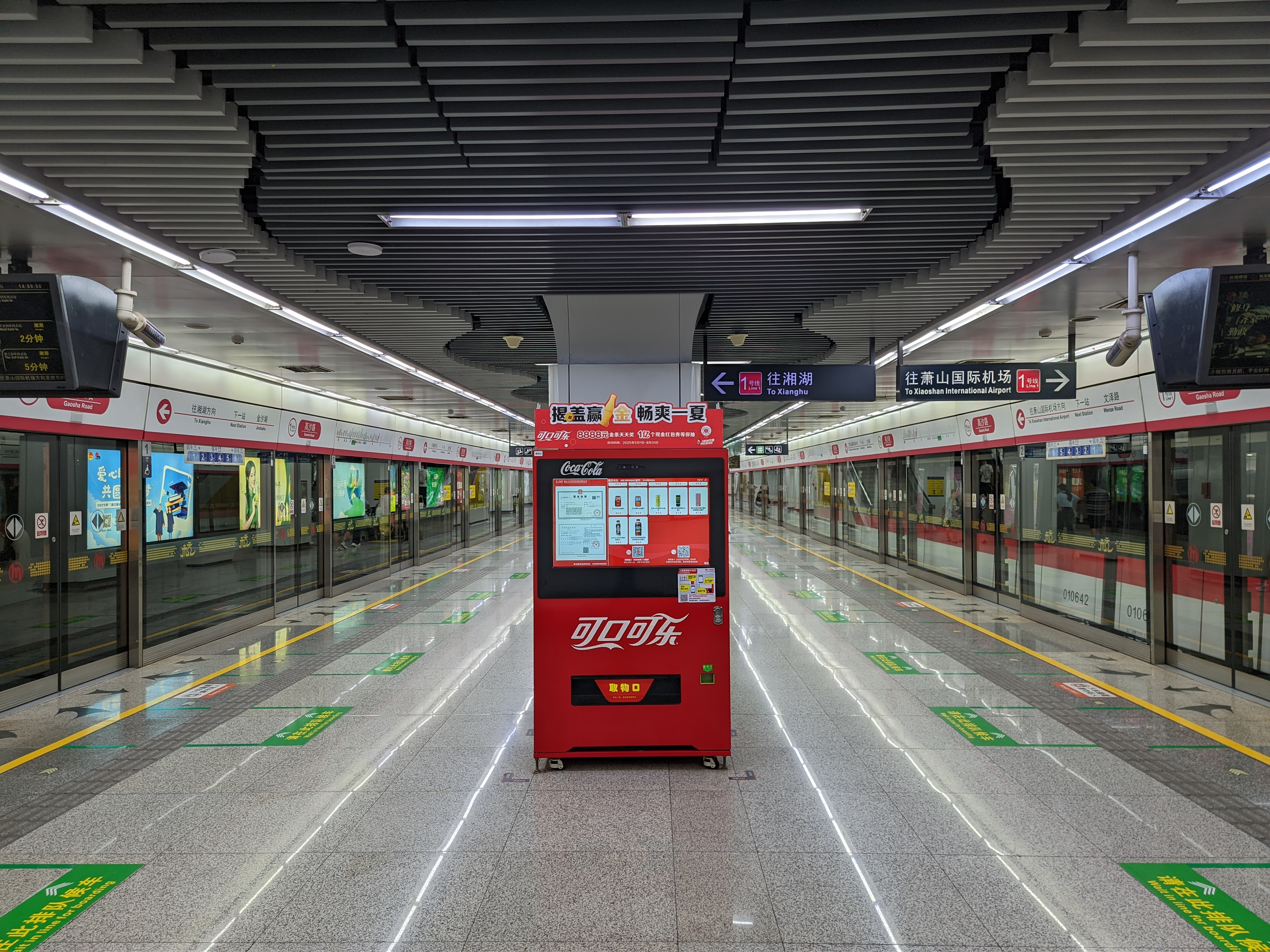
Platforms

=== Entrances/exits ===
- A: Wujiao Paradise Walk
- B: Jinsha Avenue
- C2: Caitong Center
- D1: Jinsha Incity
