= Xiasha (disambiguation) =

Xiasha may refer to:

- Xiasha Subdistrict (Chinese: 下沙, p Xiàshā, lit. "Lower Sands"), a subdistrict of Qiantang District, Hangzhou, in Zhejiang Province, China.
- Xiasha (Shanghai), one of the shoals composing Jiuduansha, in Shanghai, China
- Xiasha station (Shanghai Metro), a metro station in Shanghai, China
- Xiasha station (Shenzhen Metro), a metro station in Shenzhen, China
- West Xiasha station, a metro station in Hangzhou, China
- Xiasha Jiangbin station, another metro station in Hangzhou, China

== See also ==
- Xisha (disambiguation)
