= West Xiasha station =

Hangzhou Metro station

West Xiasha 下沙西
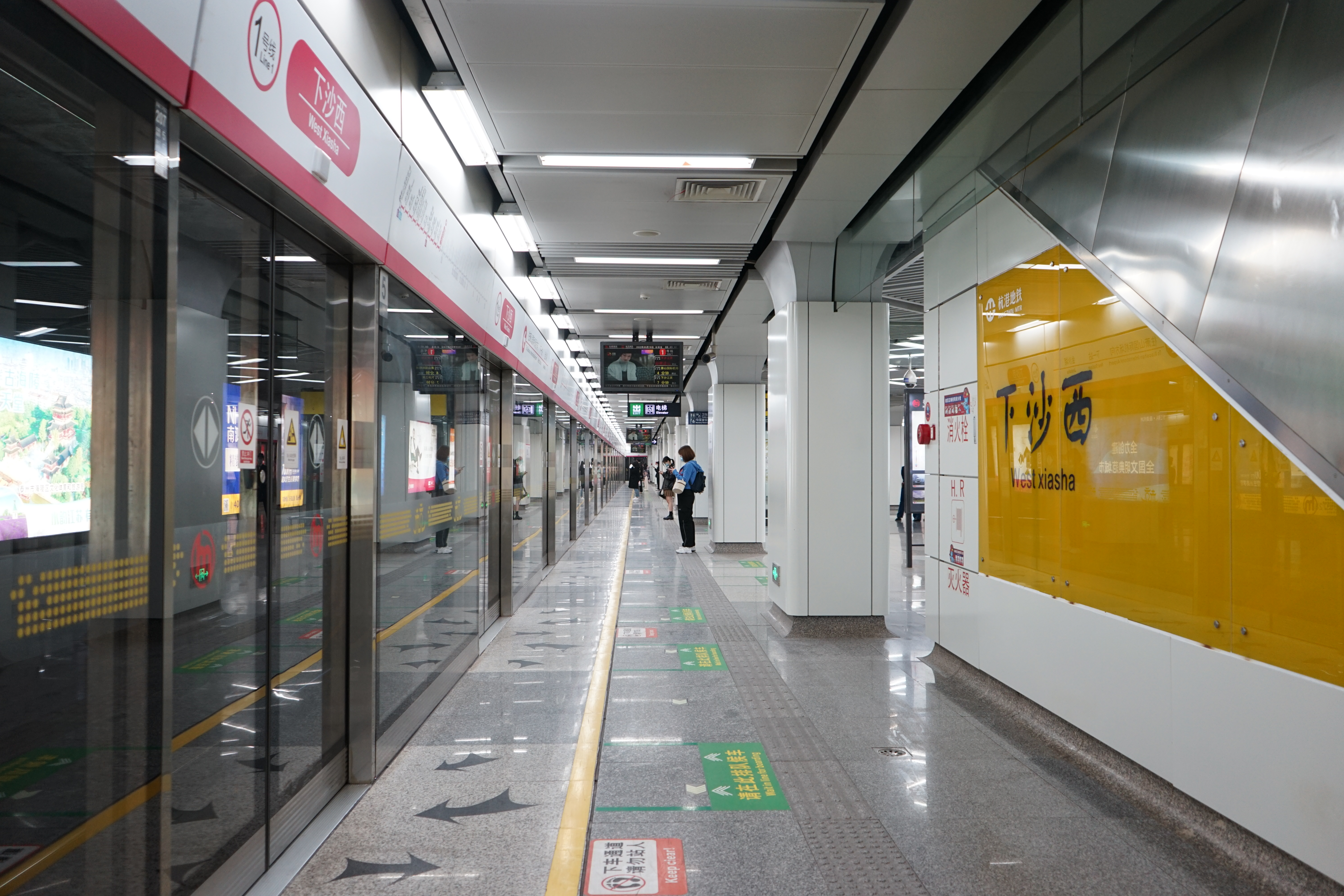
- Platform

General information
- Location: Jinsha Avenue × Songhe Road; Qiantang District, Hangzhou, Zhejiang; China
- Coordinates: 30°18′44″N 120°18′29″E
- System: Hangzhou metro station
- Operator: Hangzhou MTR Corporation
- Line: Line 1
- Platforms: 2 (1 island platform)

Construction
- Structure type: Underground
- Accessible: Yes

History
- Opened: 24 November 2012

Services
Preceding station	Hangzhou Metro	Following station
Coach Center towards Xianghu	Line 1	Jinshahu towards Xiaoshan International Airport
Location

West Xiasha (Chinese: 下沙西) is a station on Line 1 of the Hangzhou Metro in China. It was opened in November 2012, together with the rest of the stations on Line 1. It is located in the Qiantang District of Hangzhou.

== Station layout ==
West Xiasha has two levels: a concourse, and an island platform with two tracks for line 1.

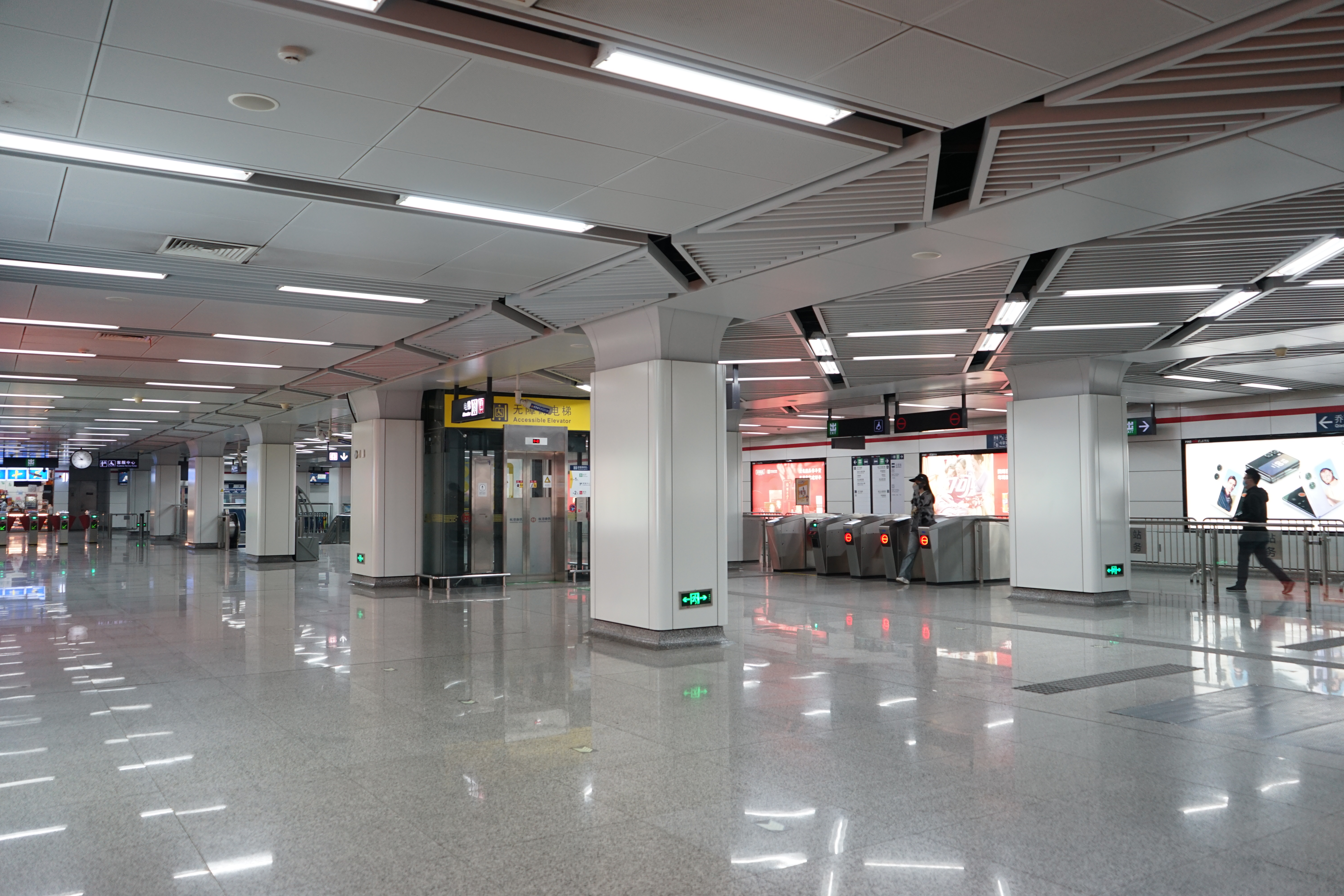
Concourse

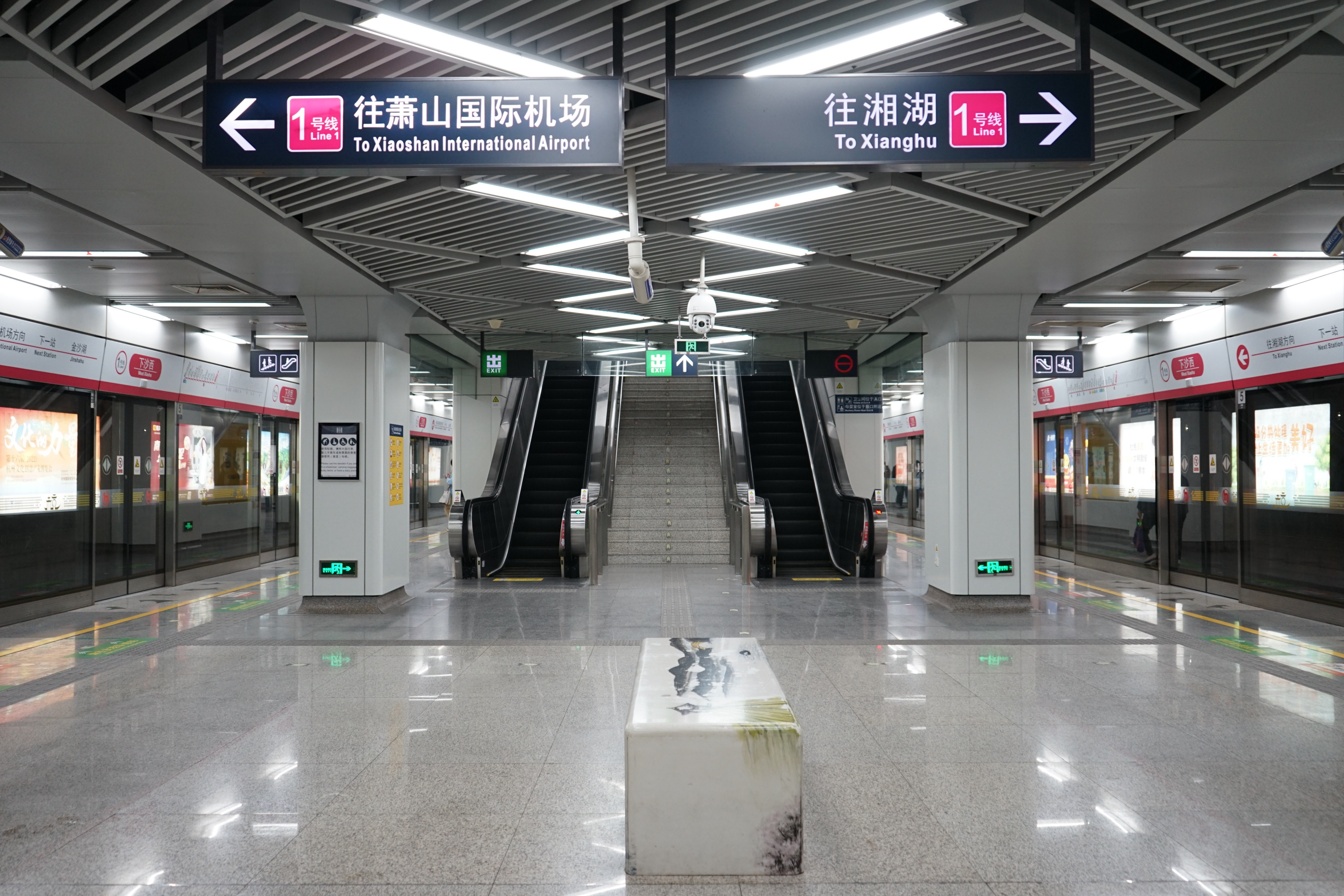
Platforms

== Entrances/exits ==
- A: Xingfu Rd. (S)
- B: north side of Jinsha Avenue
- C: south side of Jinsha Avenue
- D: Jinshahu Park
