= Gaosha =

Gaosha may refer to the following locations in China:

- Gaosha Road Station, Hangzhou Metro Line 1 (高沙路站)
- Gaosha, Fujian (高砂镇), town in Sha County
- Gaosha, Dongkou (高沙镇), town in Dongkou County
