= Xiasha station =

Xiasha station may refer to:

- Xiasha station (Shanghai Metro), a metro station in Shanghai, China
- Xiasha station (Shenzhen Metro), a metro station in Shenzhen, China

== See also ==
- West Xiasha station, a metro station in Hangzhou, China
- Xiasha Jiangbin station, another metro station in Hangzhou, China
