= Xiangyang Road station =

Hangzhou Metro station

Xiangyang Road 向阳路
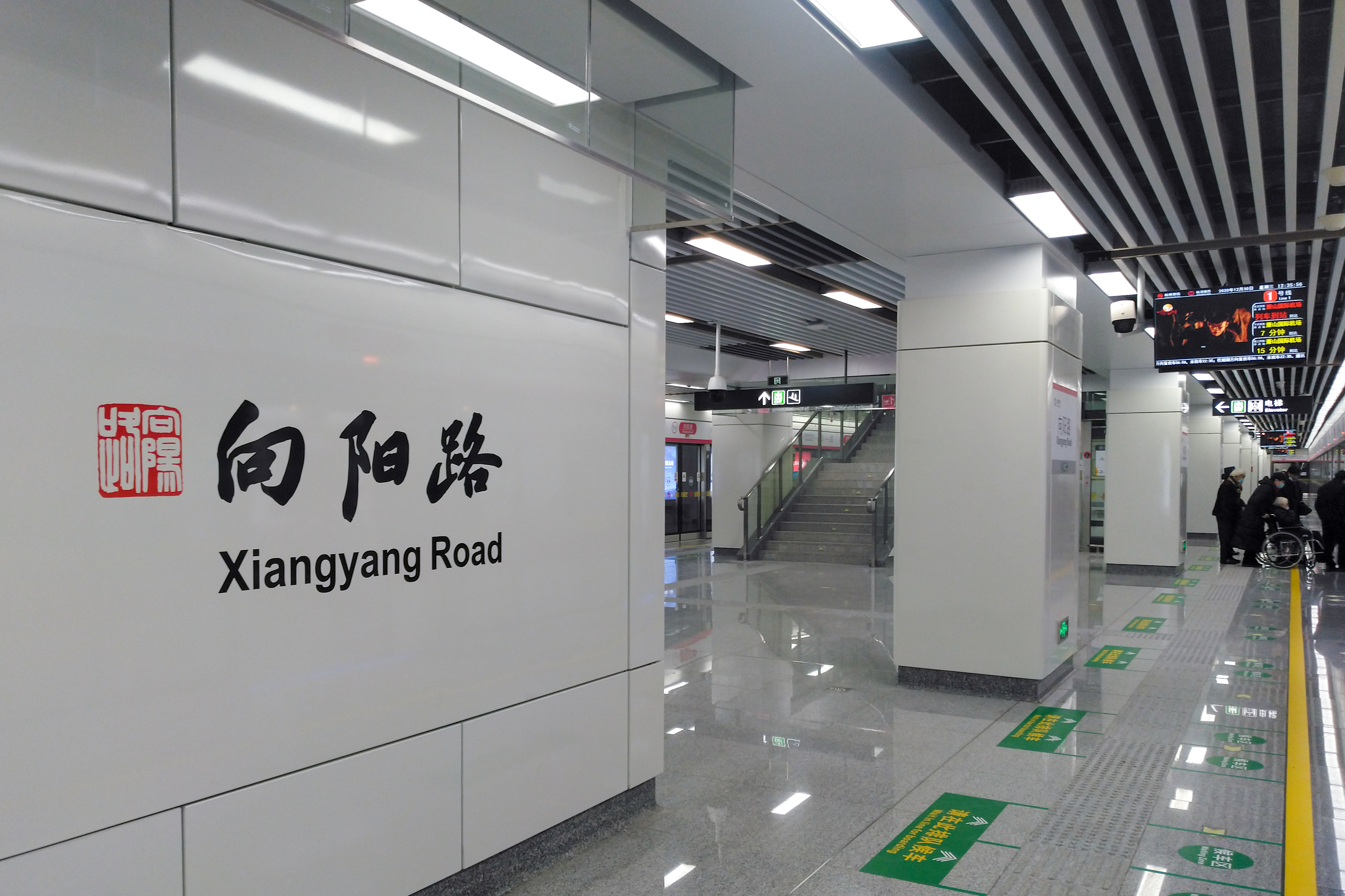
- Platform of Xiangyang Road station

General information
- Location: Xiaoshan District, Hangzhou, Zhejiang; China
- Coordinates: 30.26284°N 120.438154°E
- Operator: Hangzhou Metro Corporation
- Line: Line 1

Other information
- Station code: XYL

History
- Opened: 30 December 2020

Services
Preceding station	Hangzhou Metro	Following station
Nanyang towards Xianghu	Line 1	Xiaoshan International Airport Terminus
Location

Xiangyang Road (Chinese: 向阳路) is a metro station on Line 1 of the Hangzhou Metro in China. It was opened on 30 December 2020, together with the Phase 3 of Line 1. It is located in the Xiaoshan District of Hangzhou.
