= Line 1 (Hangzhou Metro) =

Metro line of the Hangzhou Metro system in China

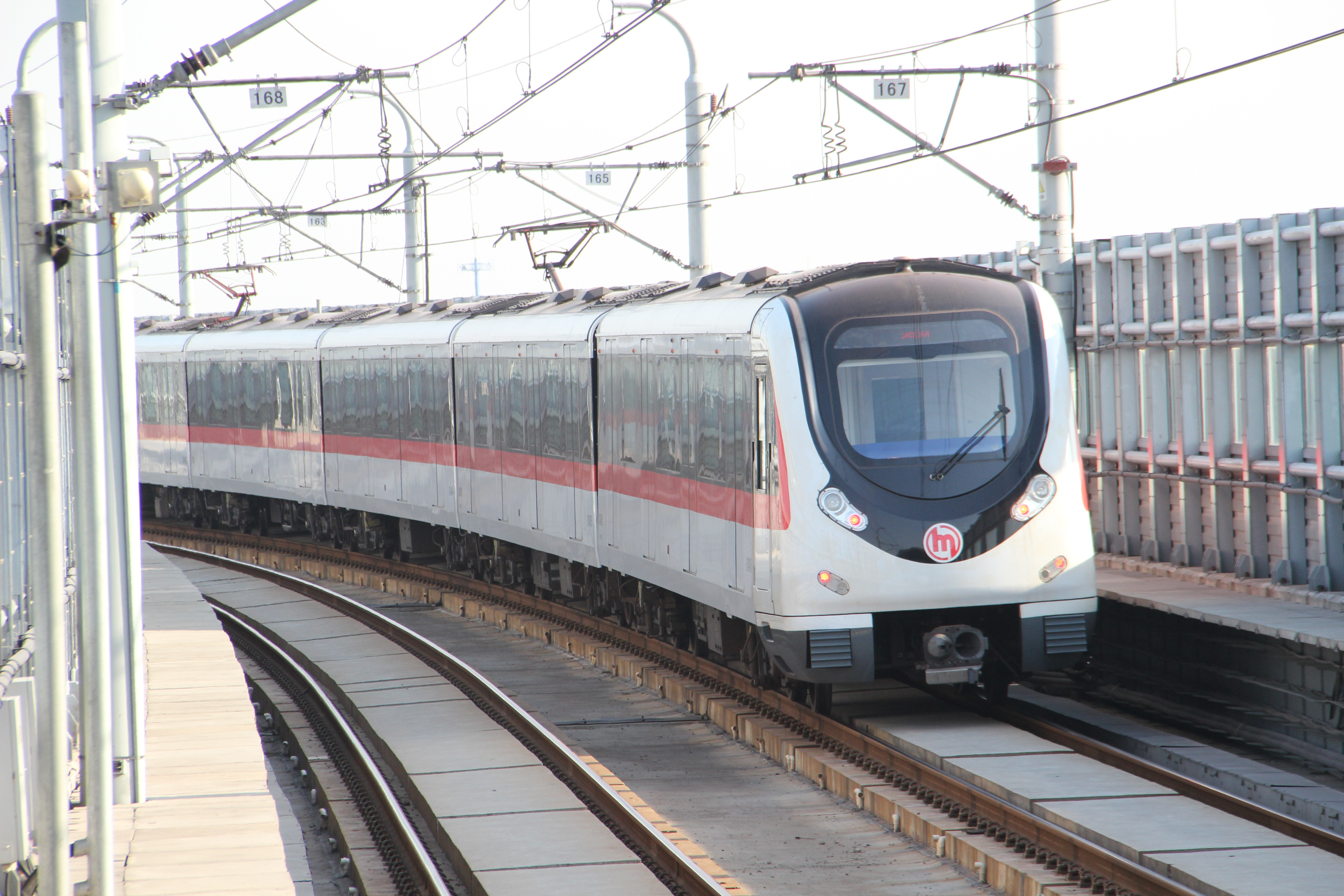
- A Line 1 train on the Linping branch (now part of Line 9)

Overview
- Status: Operational
- Owner: City of Hangzhou
- Locale: Hangzhou, Zhejiang, China
- Termini: Xianghu; Xiaoshan International Airport
- Stations: 33

Service
- Type: Rapid transit
- System: Hangzhou Metro
- Services: 2
- Operator(s): Hangzhou MTR Corporation Limited
- Depot(s): Qibao Depot; Xianghu Stabling Yard; Nanyang Stabling Yard
- Rolling stock: PM0G; PM121; PM144
- Daily ridership: 520,000 (2016 Daily Avg.); 1,270,300 (2019-05-01 peak)

History
- Opened: 24 November 2012; 13 years ago

Technical
- Line length: 52.21 km (32.44 mi)
- Number of tracks: 2
- Character: Underground
- Track gauge: 1,435 mm (4 ft 8 1/2 in)
- Electrification: Overhead line, 1500 V DC
- Operating speed: 80 km/h (50 mph)

Line 1 of the Hangzhou Metro (Chinese: 杭州地铁一号线; pinyin: Hángzhōu Dìtiě Yī Hào Xiàn) is an arc-shaped rapid transit line running from Xianghu station in western Xiaoshan District to Xiaoshan International Airport in eastern Xiaoshan District, passing through downtown Hangzhou. The line opened on 24 November 2012. It is the oldest in the city's metro network.

The line is 52 km (32 mi) long with 33 stations.

The line is operated by Hangzhou MTR, a consortium consisting of the Hangzhou Metro, which holds a 51% share, and the Hong Kong-based MTR Corporation Ltd., which holds a 49% share. As a result, the voice of Cheri Chan Yu-yan, the announcer of the Hong Kong MTR, can be heard on the English announcements on this line.

== Opening timeline ==
Segment	Commencement	Length	Station(s)	Name
Xianghu — Wenze Road	24 November 2012	34.82 km (21.64 mi)	24	Phase 1
Coach Center — Linping (Note: The branch line (Coach Center — Linping) is operated as Line 9 since 10 July 2021.)	24 November 2012	12.5 km (7.77 mi)	6	Phase 1
East Railway Station	30 June 2013	Infill station	1	Phase 1
Wenze Road — Xiashajiangbin	24 November 2015	5.7 km (3.54 mi)	3	Phase 2
Xiashajiangbin — Xiaoshan International Airport	30 December 2020	11.2 km (6.96 mi)	5	Phase 3
Coach Center — Linping	10 Jul 2021	−12.5 km (−7.77 mi)	-6	Line 1 & 9 realignment project

== Route description ==
After the Linping branch of Line 1 became part of Line 9, Line 1 now runs fully underground.

The line begins at Xianghu station in Xiaoshan District, located just north of its namesake lake. Located adjacent to Xianghu station is the Xianghu Stabling Yard, where some of the line's trains are stored and where the metro is headquartered. The line proceeds northwards along Fengqing Avenue, Bin'an Road and Jiangling Road through the central part of Binjiang District. The line then crosses the Qiantang River in a tunnel.

Upon reaching Shangcheng District on the north side of the Qiantang River, the line passes by the Hangzhou Public Security Bureau's headquarters and runs for a short distance along Wujiang Road to Hangzhou Railway Station. It reaches the downtown "U" portion of the line, which is one of the busiest parts of the line, running next the West Lake Scenic Area along Yan'an Road.

The line crosses under the Grand Canal near the Wulinmen Dock and curves eastward towards Hangzhoudong Railway Station. Its respective metro station, East Railway Station, is located underneath the arrivals hall of the station. The line continues to proceed eastward along Jiuhe Road, past the Qibao Depot, another depot on the line located adjacent to Qibao station. At Coach Center station, the Linping branch of the line formerly branched off from the main line towards Linping station, but this branch of the line has since become part of Line 9.

Upon reaching Xiasha Subdistrict, the line runs along Jinsha Avenue and 2nd Street until it reaches South Wenhai Road station, where passengers can transfer to Line 8 to continue to the east end of Qiantang District. The line then curves southwards and runs along 25th Street to Xiashajiangbin Station, the terminus of short-turn trains (roughly every other train).

The line crosses the Qiantang River in a tunnel a second time and returns to Xiaoshan District. It passes through some low-density areas, crosses under one of the runways of Hangzhou Xiaoshan International Airport, and finally terminates at Xiaoshan International Airport station, located among the terminals.

== Service routes ==
- Xianghu — Xiaoshan International Airport
- Xianghu — Xiashajiangbin
- Xiaoshan International Airport — Xianghu

First trains depart at:

- Xianghu: 5:54
- Longxiangqiao: 6:03
- East railway station: 6:07
- Jiuhe Road: 6:00

First trains depart at:

- Xiaoshan International Airport: 6:00
- Xiashajiangbin: 5:54
- Pengbu: 6:00
- Fengqi Road: 6:07

== Stations ==
Station name		Connections	Distance km		Location
English	Chinese	Connections	Distance km		Location
Xianghu	湘湖		0.00	0.00	Xiaoshan
Binkang Road	滨康路	5	1.884	1.884	Binjiang
Xixing	西兴		1.126	3.010	Binjiang
Binhe Road	滨和路		1.411	4.421	Binjiang
Jiangling Road	江陵路	6	1.070	5.491	Binjiang
Jinjiang	近江	4	3.102	8.593	Shangcheng
Wujiang Road	婺江路		0.930	9.523	Shangcheng
Chengzhan	城站	5 HZH	1.286	10.809	Shangcheng
Ding'an Road	定安路		1.239	12.048	Shangcheng
Longxiangqiao	龙翔桥		1.230	13.278	Shangcheng
Fengqi Road	凤起路	2	0.918	14.196	Gongshu
Wulin Square	武林广场	3	1.064	15.260	Gongshu
West Lake Cultural Square	西湖文化广场	3 19	0.850	16.110	Gongshu
Datieguan	打铁关	5 15	1.452	17.562	Gongshu
Zhalongkou	闸弄口	18	1.564	19.126	Shangcheng
East Railway Station	火车东站	4; 6 19 (Note: Out-of-station interchange with East Railway Station (East Square)); HGH	2.205	21.331	Shangcheng
Pengbu	彭埠	4	1.028	22.359	Shangcheng
Qibao	七堡		1.827	24.186	Shangcheng
Jiuhe Road	九和路		1.361	25.547	Shangcheng
Jiubao	九堡		1.303	26.850	Shangcheng
Coach Center	客运中心	9	1.293	28.143	Shangcheng
West Xiasha	下沙西		3.245	31.388	Qiantang
Jinshahu	金沙湖		1.277	32.665	Qiantang
Gaosha Road	高沙路		0.939	33.604	Qiantang
Wenze Road	文泽路		1.256	34.860	Qiantang
South Wenhai Road	文海南路	8	2.683	37.543	Qiantang
Yunshui	云水		1.281	38.824	Qiantang
Xiashajiangbin	下沙江滨		1.684	40.508	Qiantang
Hangzhou Grand Convention and Exhibition Center	杭州大会展中心		3.746	44.254	Xiaoshan
Gangcheng Avenue	港城大道		1.278	45.532	Xiaoshan
Nanyang	南阳		1.353	46.885	Xiaoshan
Xiangyang Road	向阳路		1.595	48.480	Xiaoshan
Xiaoshan International Airport	萧山国际机场	7 19 HGH	3.516	51.996	Xiaoshan

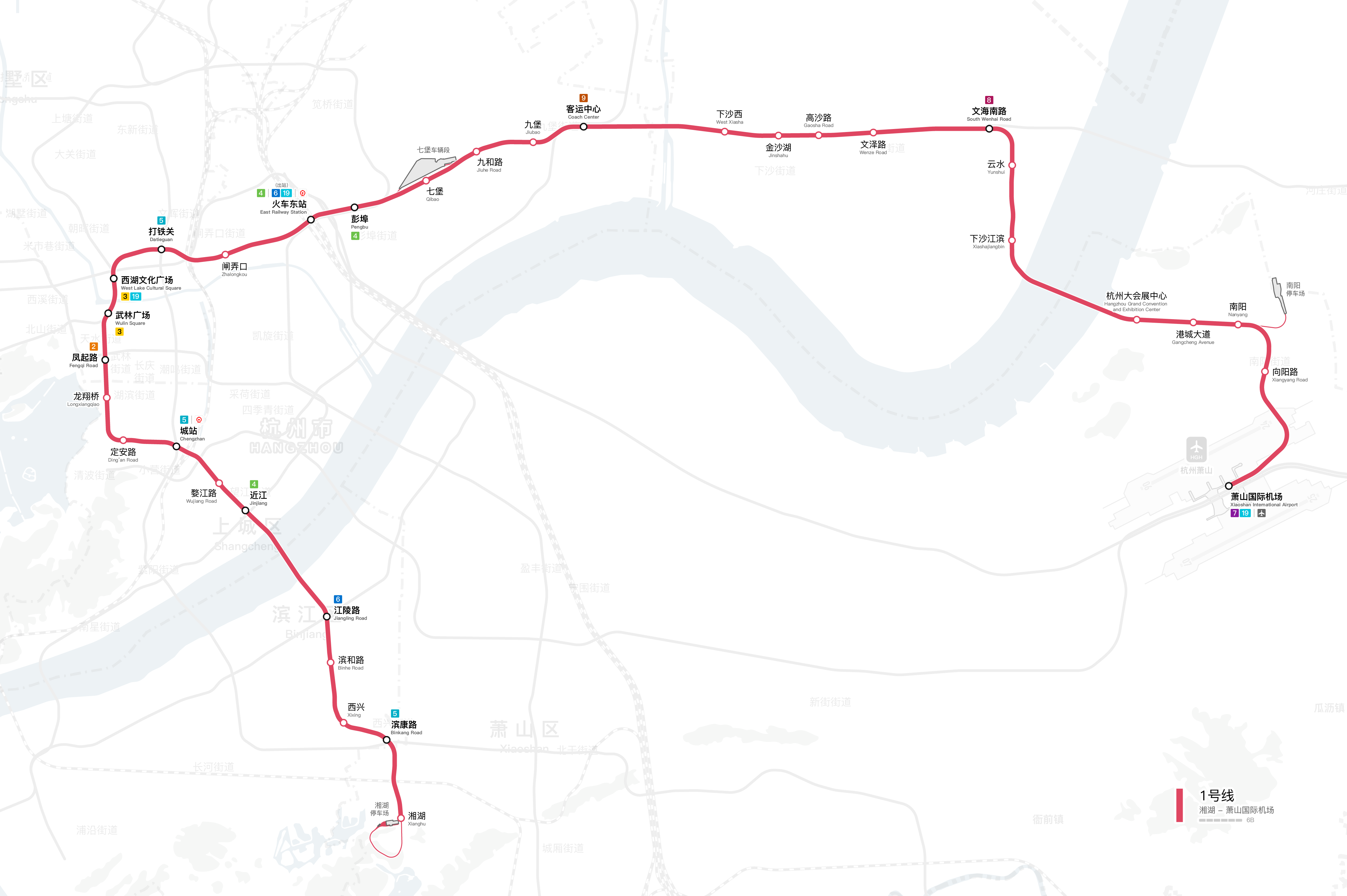
To scale map of Hangzhou Metro Line 1

== Rolling stock ==
Stock	Class	Year built	Builder	Number built	Numbers	Formation	Depots	Line assigned	Notes
PM0G	B	2010-2013	CSR Nanjing Puzhen	288 (48 sets)	01 001 - 01 048 (010011-010486)	Tc+Mp+M+M+Mp+Tc	Xianghu Yard; Qibao Depot; Nanyang Yard	1	
PM121	B	2017-2019	CRRC Nanjing Puzhen	144 (24 sets)	01 049 - 01 072 (010491-010726)	Tc+Mp+M+M+Mp+Tc	Xianghu Yard; Qibao Depot; Nanyang Yard	1	
PM144	B	2020-2021	CRRC Nanjing Puzhen	48 (8 sets)	01 073 - 01 080 (010731-010806)	Tc+Mp+M+M+Mp+Tc	Xianghu Yard; Qibao Depot; Nanyang Yard	1	

== Incident ==
On 15 November 2008 at 3:20 pm, a ground collapse accident occurred at the construction site of Xianghu station causing the construction area to collapse approximately 100 meters long and 50 meters wide, and the roadbed on the west side of the construction site sank to about 6 meters. The incident causing a total of 21 deaths, 4 serious injuries, 20 minor injuries, and direct economic losses of about 49.61 million yuan.

== See also ==
- Hangzhou Metro
