= Xisha (disambiguation) =

Xisha (Chinese: 西沙, "Western Sands") is the Chinese name for the Hoàng Sa or Paracel Islands.

It may also refer to:

- Xisha (Yangtze), one of the former islands which developed into Chongming

== See also ==
- Xiasha (disambiguation)
