= Dingwen Academy Hangzhou =

International school in Hangzhou, China

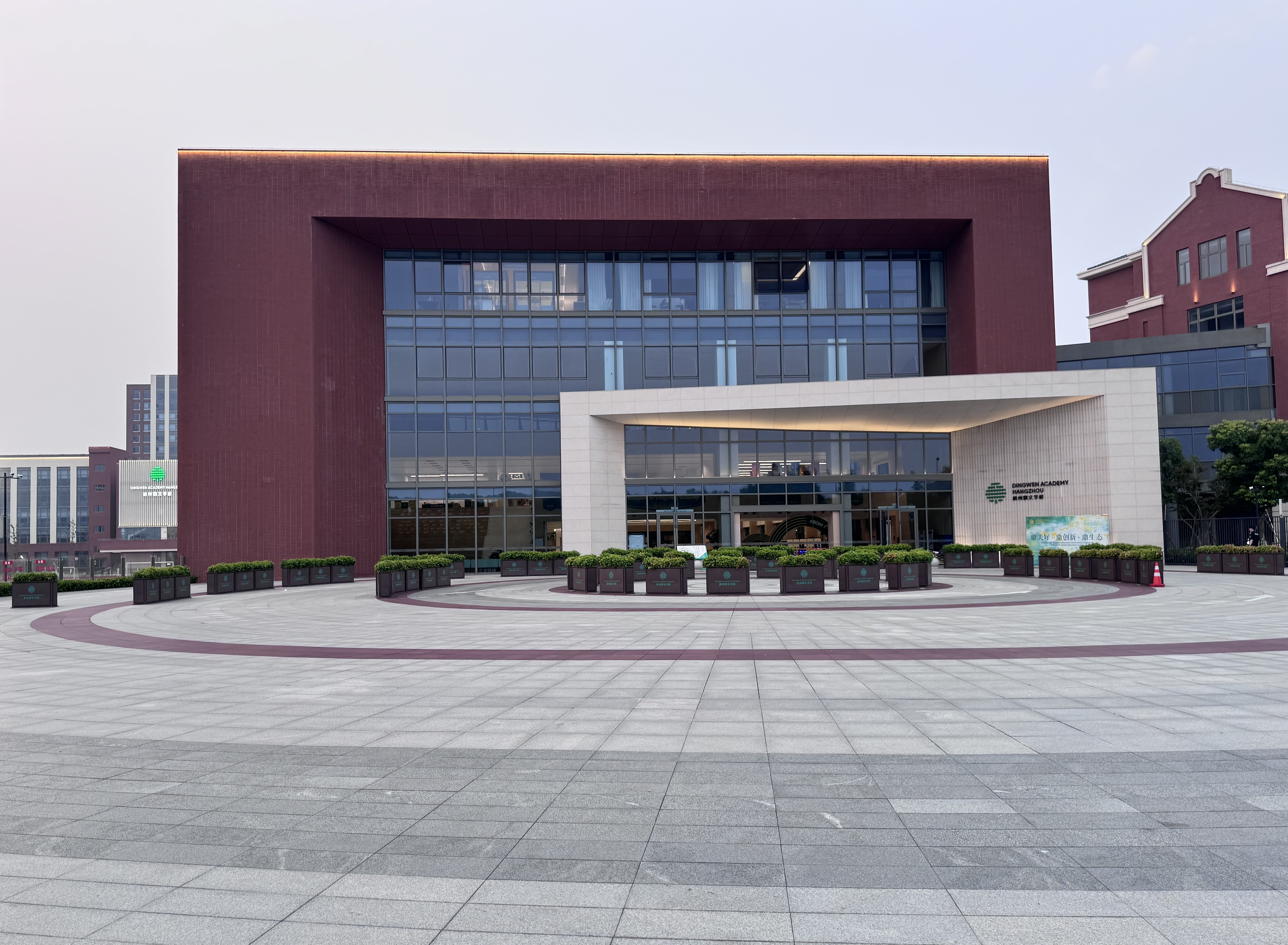
- Dingwen Academy Hangzhou in June 2026

Location
- No. 1, Xiushui Street, Qiantang District; Hangzhou, Zhejiang; China; 30.326919°N 120.392228°E

Information
- Type: Private bilingual international school
- Motto: Rooted in China, Globally Competent, Universally Compassionate
- Established: 2024 (2 years ago)
- Head of school: Maggie Ye
- Grades: Pre‑K–12
- Gender: Coeducational
- Enrollment: 300+
- Language: Chinese, English
- Campus size: 26.7 ha (66 acres) (site area); 183,000 m^{2} (1,970,000 sq ft) (gross floor area)
- Campus type: Urban
- Colors: Navy blue, green, and white
- Mascot: Kunpeng (鲲鹏)
- Website: www.dingwenacademy.com

Dingwen Academy Hangzhou (DWA; Chinese: 杭州鼎文学校) is a private, co-educational, bilingual international school for students from pre-kindergarten to Grade 12. It is located in Hangzhou, the capital of Zhejiang province in China.

The school was founded in 2024 as a boarding and day school and is accredited by Cognia.

The campus is located in Qiantang District, near Xiasha Higher Education Park (下沙高教园区) [zh].

== History ==
In 2021, Dingwen Academy Hangzhou was included in Qiantang District's five-year development plan to expand international education.

In March 2024, the school hosted a parent meeting to introduce its educational philosophy and design as well as campus facilities. In April 2024, Zhejiang Online reported that DWA's high school division was planning to recruit two classes totaling 48 students for its September opening. On September 9, 2024, the school had its opening ceremony.

In April 2025, the school opened the Eco-Innovation Center. The center uses outdoor learning spaces for environmental education.

By October 2025, Dingwen Academy Hangzhou was authorized by the International Baccalaureate as an IB World School.

In November 2025, Hangzhou Daily reported that the school's eco‑innovation center was one of two Hangzhou cases presented at the United Nations China Youth Environment Forum in Hong Kong.

In October 2026, the school hosted a university fair attended by representatives from more than 100 universities worldwide.

== Campus and facilities ==
The campus covers around 400 mu, or about 26.7 ha (66 acres), and has around 183,000 m^{2} (1,970,000 sq ft) of floor area. Its facilities include an educational farm, wetlands, an herb garden, a 50-meter swimming pool, and squash and basketball courts.

The school has separate libraries for kindergarten, primary, and secondary students. It also has a 700-seat theater, a black box theater, drama studios, rehearsal rooms, science laboratories, and a recording studio.

Students may use the school's outdoor areas for planting activities and to learn about plant growth and wetland ecosystems.

Boarding is available from primary through high school. The school also has a boarding parent committee and organizes parent education activities.

== Academics ==
In 2026, the school reported that over 90% of its teachers had a master's degree or higher and that 40% were expatriate teachers. Instruction combines Chinese educational foundations with international curricula taught in English.

According to the school, in the compulsory-education years (primary and junior secondary), it follows China's compulsory education curriculum while also offering international programs. The primary division incorporates elements of the International Primary Curriculum and the IB Primary Years Programme. The junior secondary division also uses bilingual instruction and includes an Education for International Understanding (EIU) program. Furthermore, it prepares students for IGCSE as a bridge to senior secondary studies.

At the senior secondary level, the school offers the IB Diploma Programme and A-level as separate pathways. Students may also take individual Advanced Placement courses. Dingwen Academy Hangzhou is listed on Pearson Edexcel's mainland center list as center no. 96988 for International GCSE and A-level examinations.

The school provides student support through its Student Development Department and University Guidance Center. The former focuses on students' emotional well-being and personal development. The latter offers university and career guidance for students in grades 6–12.

== Extracurricular activities ==
The school's extracurricular activities include sports such as golf, equestrian sports, tennis, squash, fencing, and rowing.

Students also have the opportunity to participate in practical programming and robotics activities such as writing code and building and controlling robots through computer programs.

Other activities offered by the school include Model United Nations, filmmaking, academic support, competition training, and educational trips. Students may also take part in drama, music, as well as visual arts activities. These include theatre performances and exhibitions of student work in painting, sculpture, ceramics, and calligraphy.

The school also participates in the Duke of Edinburgh’s International Award program.

== Admissions ==
Dingwen Academy Hangzhou admits both Chinese and foreign nationals. In 2025, the district education bureau included the school among local private schools that accept online applications. Hangzhou.com.cn reported that two city-approved private schools, Hangzhou Yungu School and Dingwen Academy Hangzhou, could accept supplemental applications citywide if seats remained after the main admissions round.
