= Wu Xianghu =

Chinese journalist

- Wu Xianghu
- Born: c. 1964
- Died: February 2, 2006
- Occupation: Journalist
- Known for: Editor of Taizhou Evening News
- Notable work: Critical article on local traffic police

Wu Xianghu (吴湘湖; c. 1964 – February 2, 2006) was a Chinese journalist who served as the editor of the Taizhou Evening News or Taizhou Wanbao in Zhejiang, China and was the subject of a police attack.

== Background ==
Wu Xianghy gained widespread attention when he authored an article, published on October 19, 2005, sharply criticizing local traffic police for what he asserted were exorbitant electric bicycle fees. This critical piece resulted in being attacked by local police officers.

Following the publication of his article, the newspaper's office became the target of a police raid, during which Wu Xianghu was subjected to a severe assault by dozens of local police officers. The assault occurred after Xianghu declined to offer an apology for the content of his article. The incident led to the dismissal of Senior Police Officer Li Xiaoguo, who was implicated in the altercation, as reported by various Chinese media outlets. Tragically, the injuries sustained during this encounter ultimately led to Wu Xianghu's demise in February 2006.

The watchdog group Committee to Protect Journalists reported that Xianghu died of liver and kidney failure. The Committee has claimed that Chinese media failed to report his death despite reporting on the incident in October 2005.

No one was ever charged in connection with the assault on Xianghu.
