= Qiantang, Hangzhou =

Qiantang District 钱塘区
- District
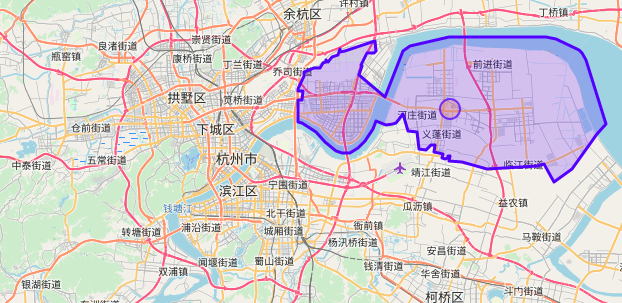
- Location of Qiantang District near the core area of Hangzhou

- Location of Zhejiang
- Coordinates: 30°19′N 120°29′E
- District: People's Republic of China
- Province: Zhejiang
- Prefecture-level city: Hangzhou
- Named for: Qiantang River

Area
  - Total: 531.7 km^{2} (205.3 sq mi)

Population
  - Total: 335,000
  - Density: 630/km^{2} (1,630/sq mi)
- Time zone: UTC+8 (China Standard)

Qiantang District is a suburban district of Hangzhou, Zhejiang, China.

== History ==
1990: The Hangzhou Economic and Technological Development Zone was established.

April 1993: Approved by the State Council, Hangzhou Economic and Technological Development Zone was established as a national development zone.

May 1996: Xiasha Township was transferred from Yuhang City to Jianggan District.

October 1998: Xiasha Township was revoked and Xiasha Town was established.

April 2000: Hangzhou Export Processing Zone was established.

August 2000: Xiasha Higher Education Park (下沙高教园区) [zh] was established.

2001: Jiangdong Industrial Park started to build.

2002: Qianjin Industrial Park began to build.

2002: Xiasha Town was revoked and Xiasha Subdistrict and Baiyang Subdistrict were established.

2003: Construction of Linjiang Industrial Park began.

2006: The three parks were officially established after approval.

2006: Qianjin Industrial Park was included in the city-level management and hosted by the Hangzhou Economic and Technological Development Zone.

2009: Dajiangdong "removed towns and established streets", adopted the operation mode of "integrating cities and streets, and leading streets with cities", and Jiangdong New Town and Linjiang New Town were officially listed.

September 9, 2011: Establishment of the Hangzhou Dajiangdong Industrial Cluster.

2015: The Dajiangdong Industrial Agglomeration Zone was included in the city-level management.

April 4, 2019: The Hangzhou Qiantang New Area was established, the Hangzhou Dajiangdong Industrial Cluster was disestablished, and three brands of the Hangzhou Economic and Technological Development Zone, the Zhejiang Hangzhou Export Processing Zone, and the Hangzhou Linjiang High-tech Industrial Development Zone were retained.

On October 23, 2019, Hangzhou's Qiantang New District and Jiaxing's Haining City signed a comprehensive strategic cooperation agreement, and Haining "Hanghai New District" was included in the strategic planning scope of Hangzhou Qiantang New District.

April 9, 2021: Qiantang District was formally established.

== Science, education, culture and health ==
- Secondary industry
  - The new area has platforms and enterprises such as Hangzhou Medical Port Town, GAC Passenger Vehicle (Hangzhou) Company, Xizi Aviation Industry Company, and Global Research Center for Flexible Electronics and Intelligent Technology. New materials and other industries have market competitiveness.
- Education
  - As of the end of 2024, Qiantang District had 133 schools of various types, including 84 kindergartens, 26 primary schools, 10 junior high schools, 7 nine-year schools, 2 twelve-year schools, 3 general high schools, and 1 special education school.
  - High schools in the district include Dingwen Academy Hangzhou, Hangzhou High School Qiantang, Hangzhou Qiantang Senior High School and Hangzhou Qiushi Senior High School.
  - Qiantang District is home to 14 universities.
  - It has more than 80 provincial and ministerial key disciplines such as the Hangzhou Branch of the Institute of Physics and Chemistry of the Chinese Academy of Sciences, 187 master's and doctoral degrees, more than 20 national, provincial and ministerial key laboratories, and more than 100 natural science research institutions.
- Medical hygiene
  - There are 66 health institutions of various types, including 2 Grade III Class A hospitals.

== Evaluation ==
Some media believe that the establishment of Qiantang New District can play the complementary role of Xiasha and Dajiangdong, and promote the integration of transportation and personnel between regions: Xiasha's university town can transport talents to Dajiangdong, and Dajiangdong Zeke relieves the land shortage in Xiasha and undertakes Xiasha. industrial transfer and its also linked the establishment of the new district to Hangzhou's talent policy of allowing junior college students to settle in, pointing out that the two were prepared for Hangzhou to attract talents.

== Transport ==
=== Metro ===
- Line 1 (Hangzhou Metro): 7 stations
- Line 8 (Hangzhou Metro): all stations on the Phase 1 of Line 8 is in Qiantang District
