= Xiaoshan International Airport station =

Metro station in Hangzhou

Xiaoshan International Airport 萧山国际机场
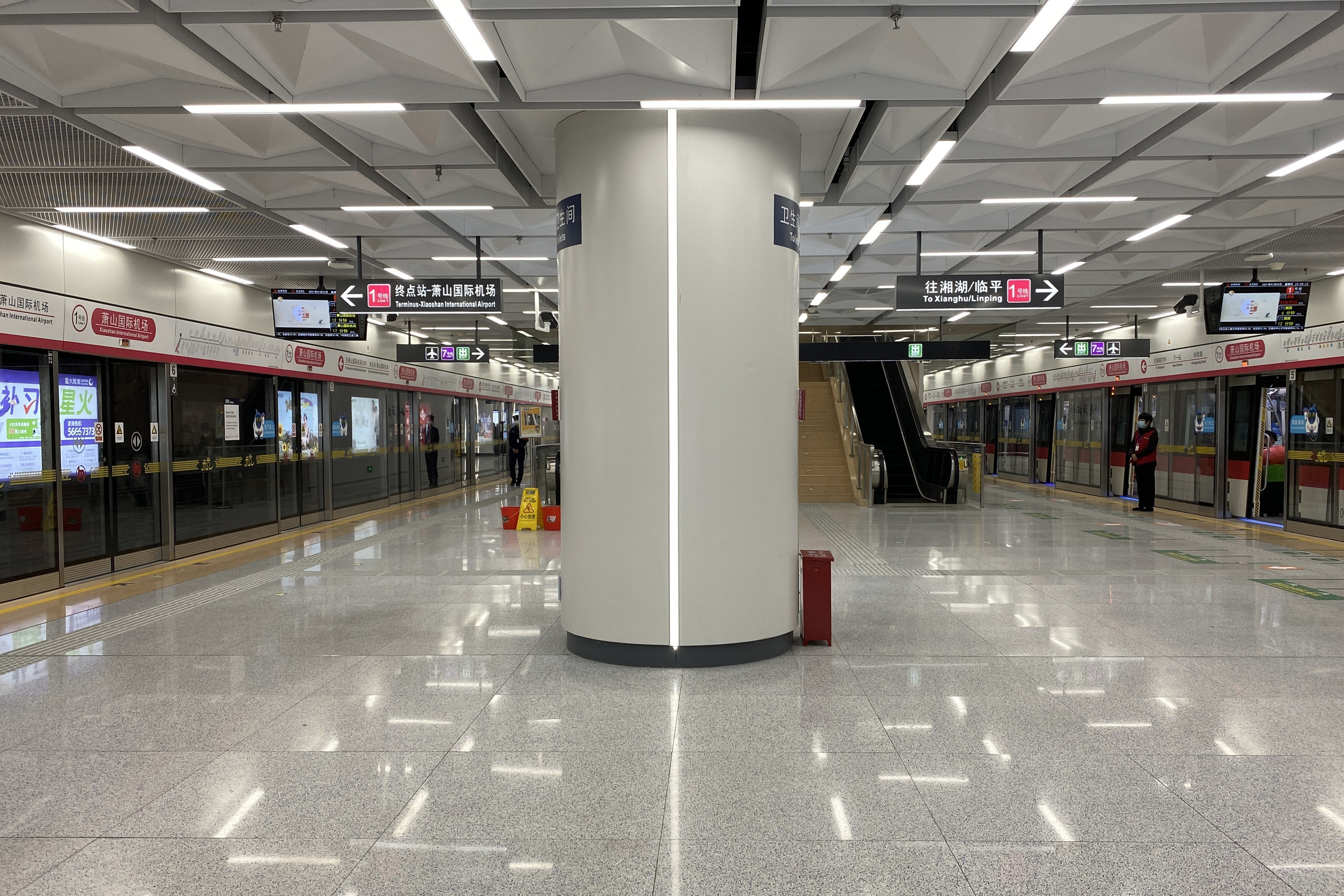
- Platform of Line 1

General information
- Location: Xiaoshan District, Hangzhou, Zhejiang; China
- Coordinates: 30.23866°N 120.430178°E
- Operator: Hangzhou Metro Corporation; Hangzhou MTR Corporation Limited
- Lines: Line 1 Line 7 Line 19

Other information
- Station code: XSG

History
- Opened: 30 December 2020 (Line 1 & Line 7); 22 September 2022 (Line 19)

Services
Preceding station	Hangzhou Metro	Following station
Xiangyang Road towards Xianghu	Line 1	Terminus
Xingang towards Wushan Square	Line 7	Yongsheng Road towards Jiangdong'er Road
Zhixing Road towards Tiaoxi	Line 19	Yongsheng Road Terminus
Location

Xiaoshan International Airport (Chinese: 萧山国际机场) is a metro station on Line 1, Line 7 and Line 19 of Hangzhou Metro in China. It is located near the Terminal 3 of Hangzhou Xiaoshan International Airport. The station began its service on 30 December 2020, together with the inauguration of Line 1 Phase 3 and Line 7. The station has 3 exits.

== Entrances and exits ==
- A: Domestic Terminal 1 and 3, International and HK & Macau & Taiwan Terminal 2
- B: Terminal 4
- C: Domestic Terminal 1 and 3, International and HK & Macau & Taiwan Terminal 2

== Station layout ==
1F	Ground	Xiaoshan International Airport Terminal 3, Airport Shuttle Bus, Taxi
B1F	Concourse	Exits, Customer Service, Metro Ticketing, Security Check
B2F; Platforms	Line 1 termination platform
Island platform, doors will open on the left
Line 1 towards Xianghu (Xiangyang Road) →
← Line 7 towards Wushan Square (Xingang)
Island platform, doors will open on the left
Line 7 towards Jiangdong'er Road (Yongsheng Road) →
← Line 19 towards Tiaoxi (Zhixing Road)
Island platform, doors will open on the left
Line 19 towards Yongsheng Road (terminus) →

== Gallery ==
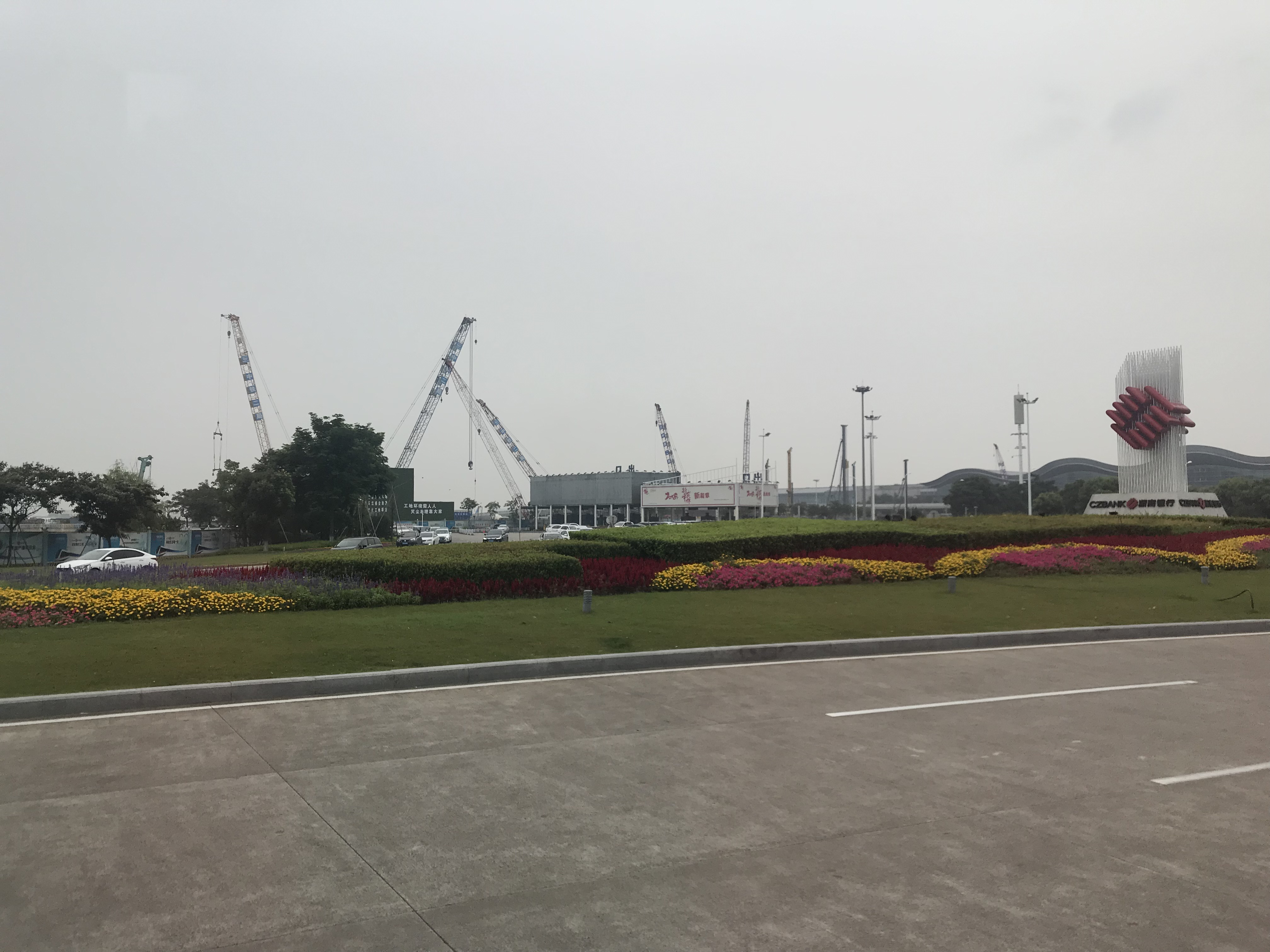
Xiaoshan International Airport station under construction (June 2018)

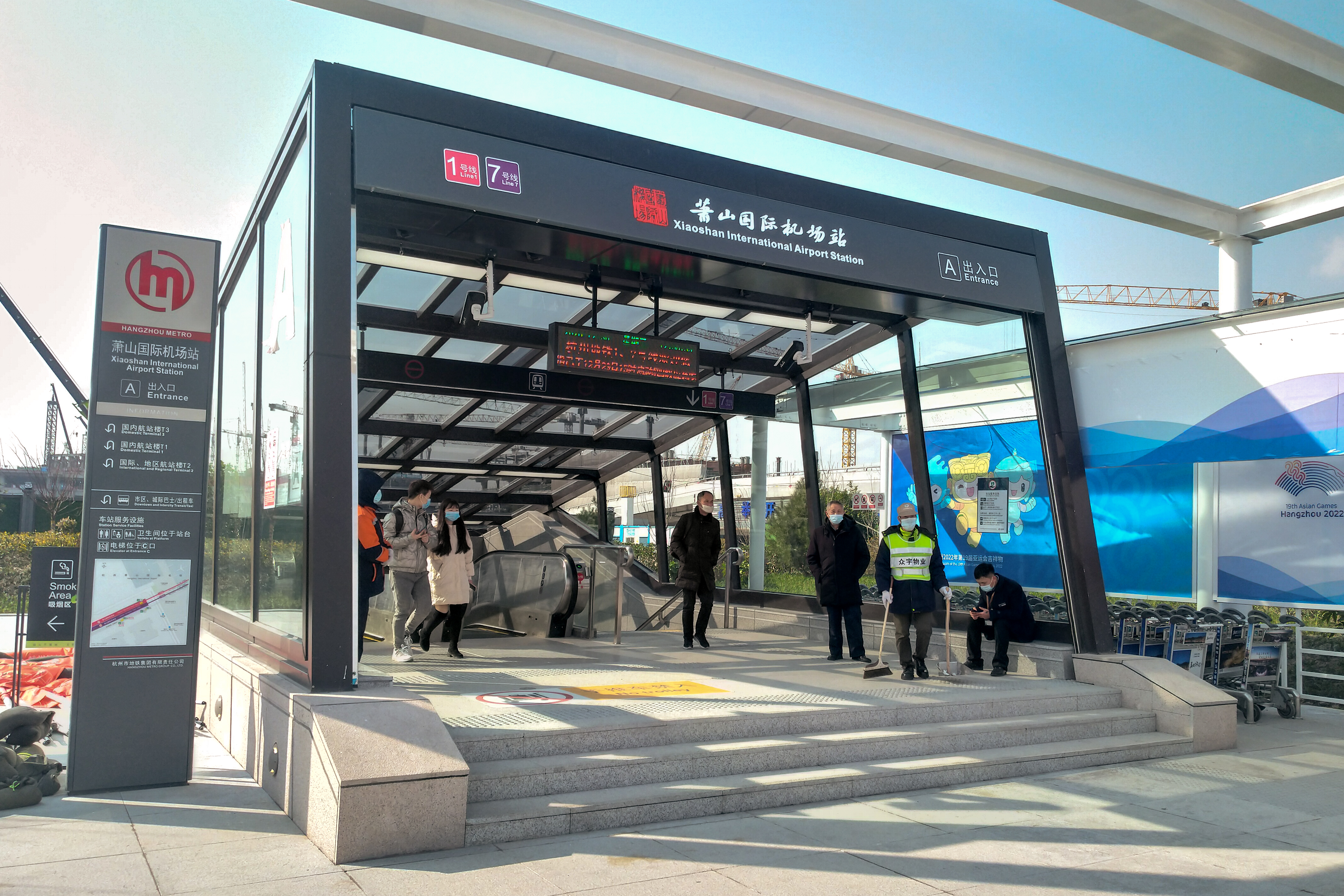
Exit A

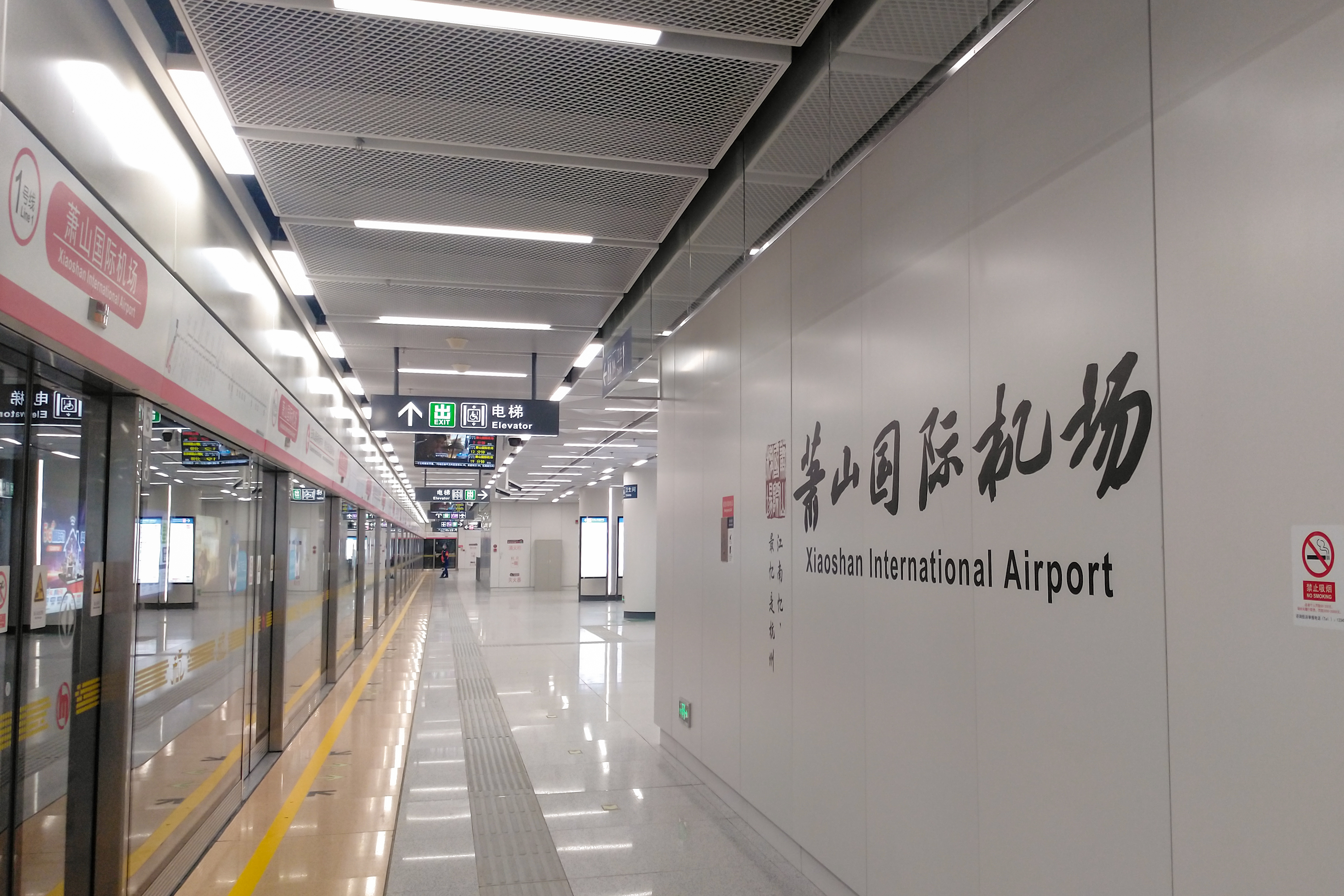
Line 1 Platform

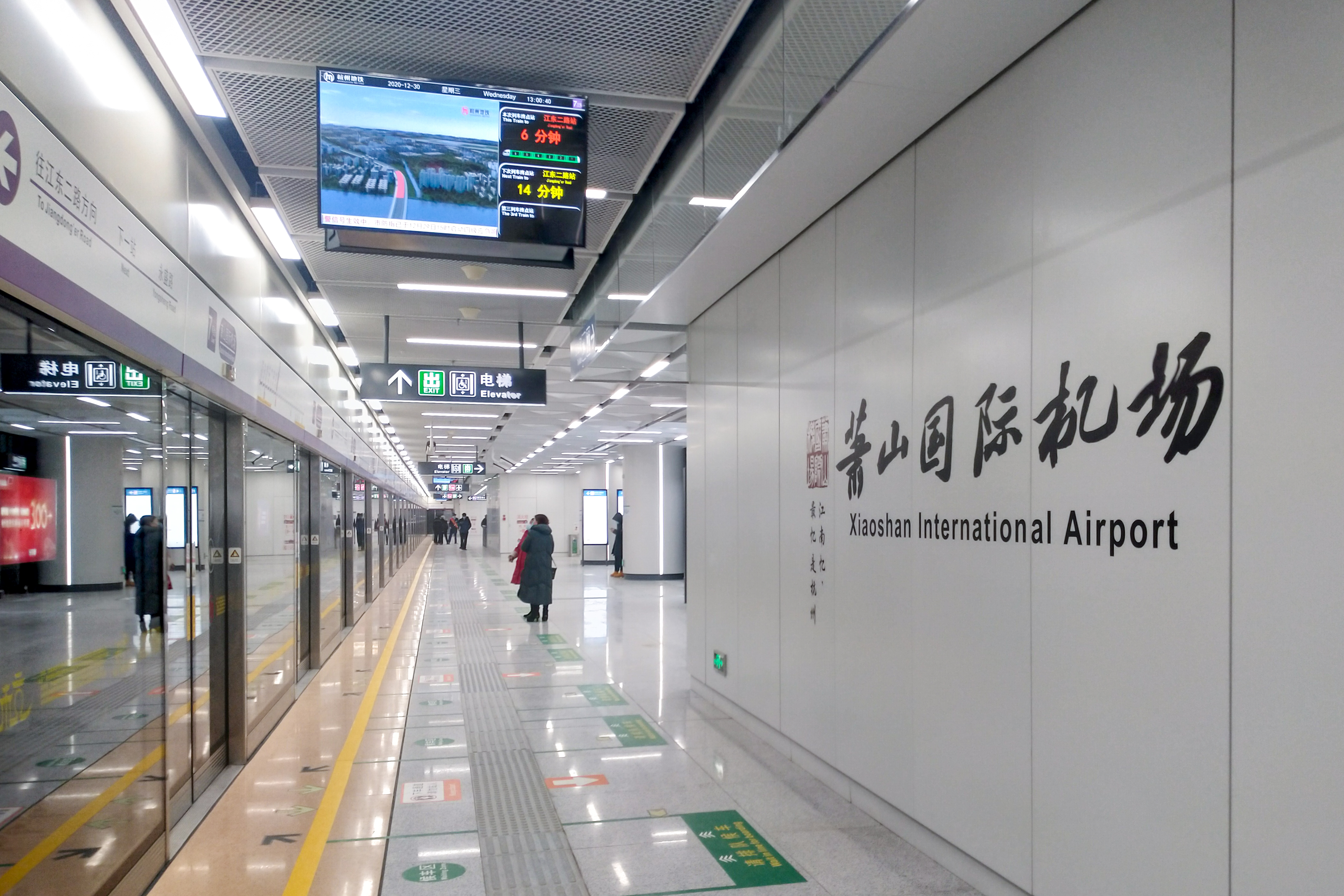
Line 7 Platform

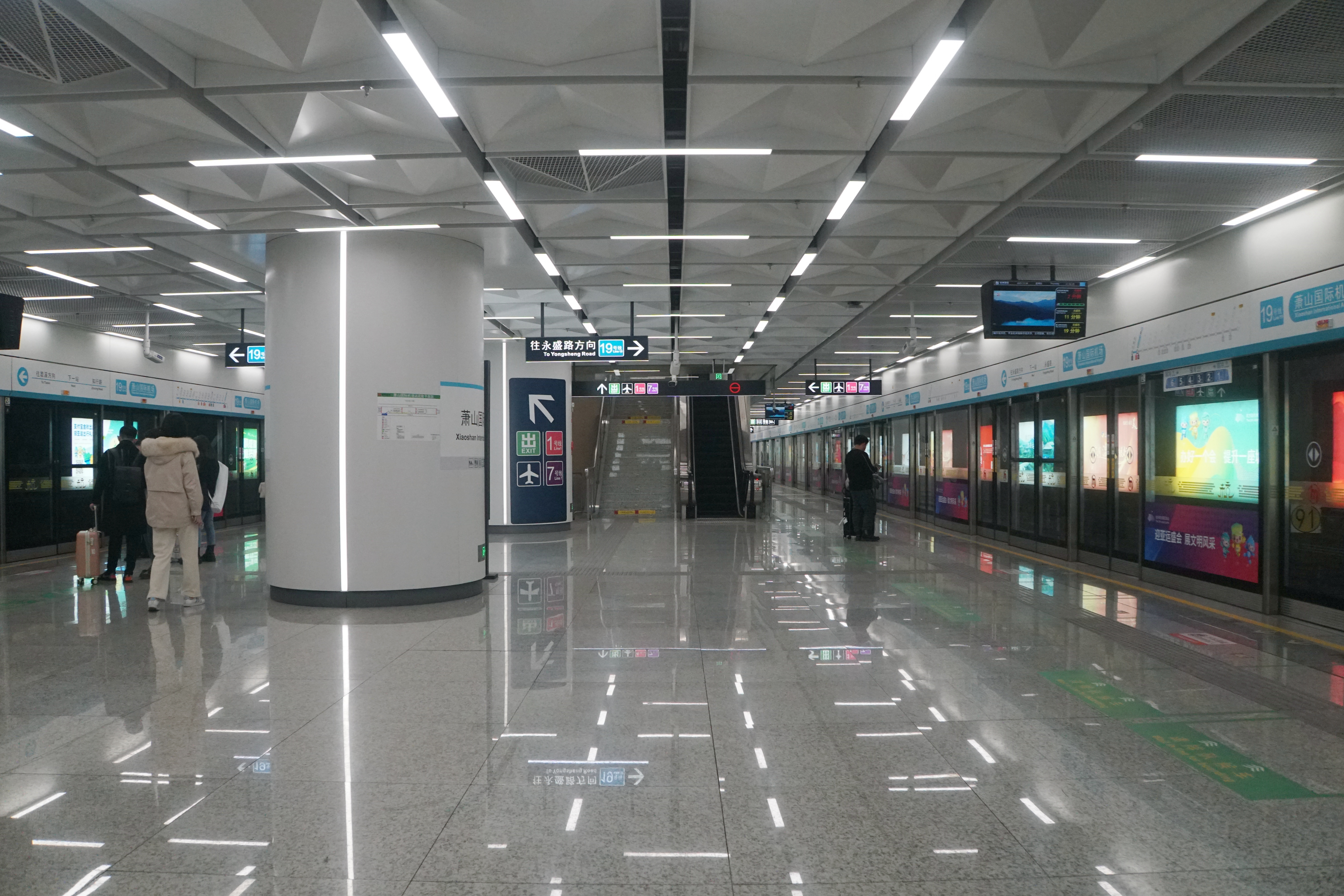
Line 19 Platform

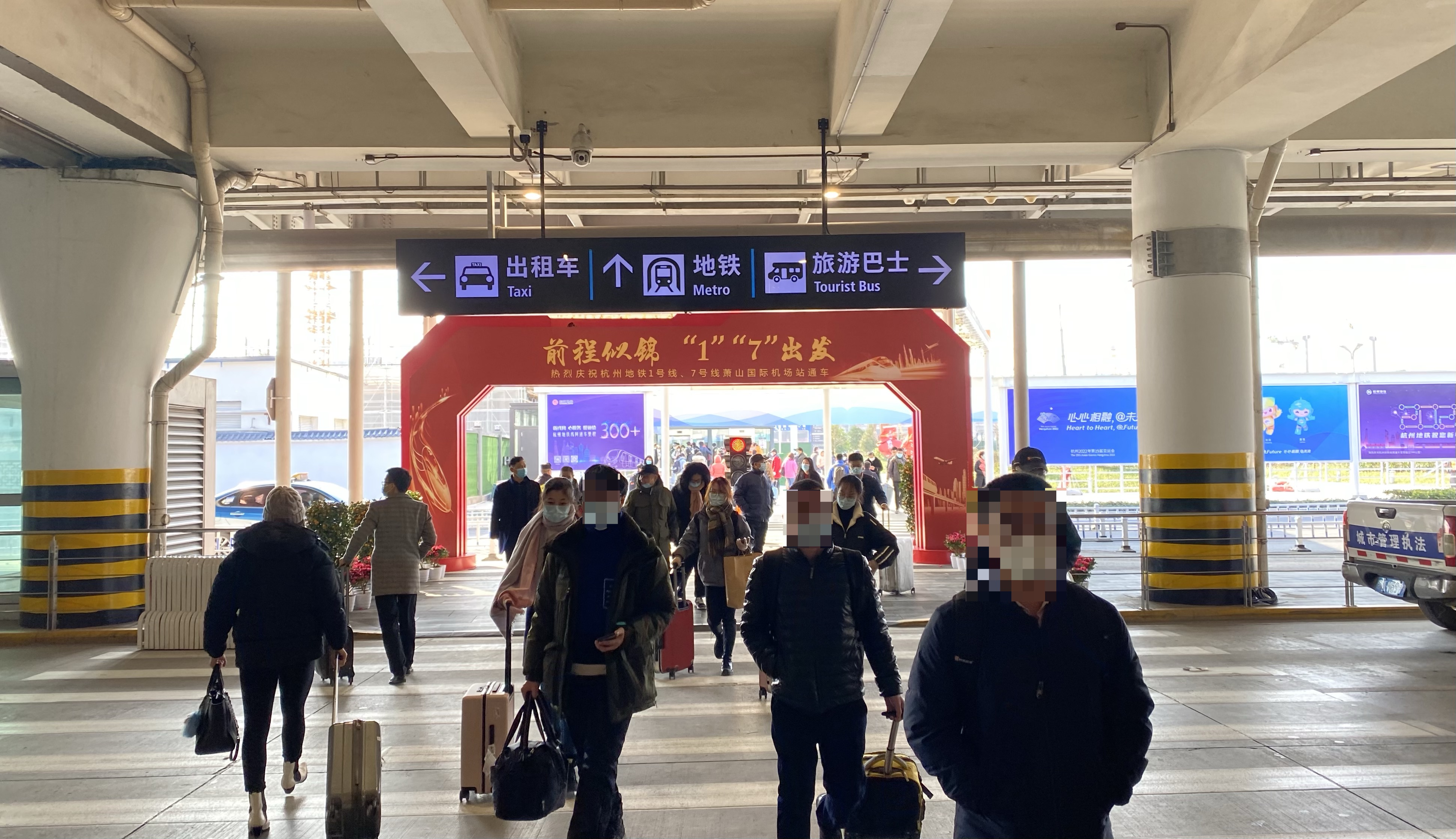
Crosswalk toward metro station
