= Xianghu station =

Hangzhou Metro station

Xianghu 湘湖
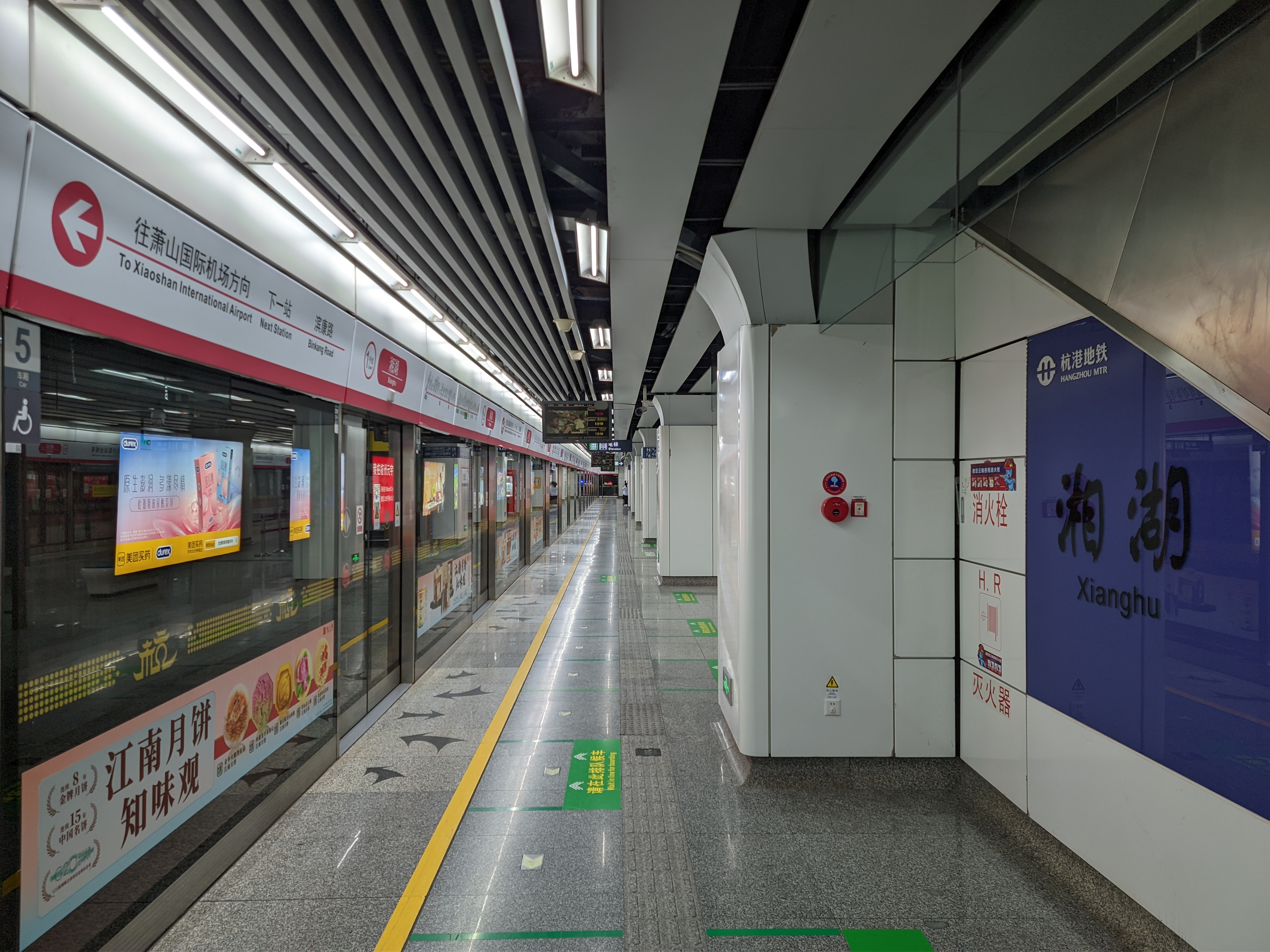
- Platform

General information
- Location: Fengqing Avenue × Xiangxi Road; Xiaoshan District, Hangzhou, Zhejiang; China
- Coordinates: 30°10′13″N 120°13′48″E
- System: Hangzhou Metro
- Operated by: Hangzhou Metro Corporation
- Line: Line 1
- Platforms: 2 (1 island platform)
- Tracks: 2

Construction
- Structure type: Underground
- Accessible: Yes

History
- Opened: November 24, 2012; 13 years ago

Services
Preceding station	Hangzhou Metro	Following station
Terminus	Line 1	Binkang Road towards Xiaoshan International Airport
Location

Xianghu (Chinese: 湘湖) is a terminus station on Line 1 of the Hangzhou Metro in Hangzhou, the capital city of Zhejiang Province, China. Xianghu is known as West Lake's "sister Lake" and is located in Xiaoshan District of Hangzhou, Zhejiang. Attractions at Xianghu include the Kuahu bridge cultural site, the world's oldest canoe, and the site of Wangcheng, an ancient military site. It was opened in November 2012, together with the rest of the stations on Line 1.

== Station layout ==
Xianghu has two levels: a concourse, and an island platform with two tracks for line 1.

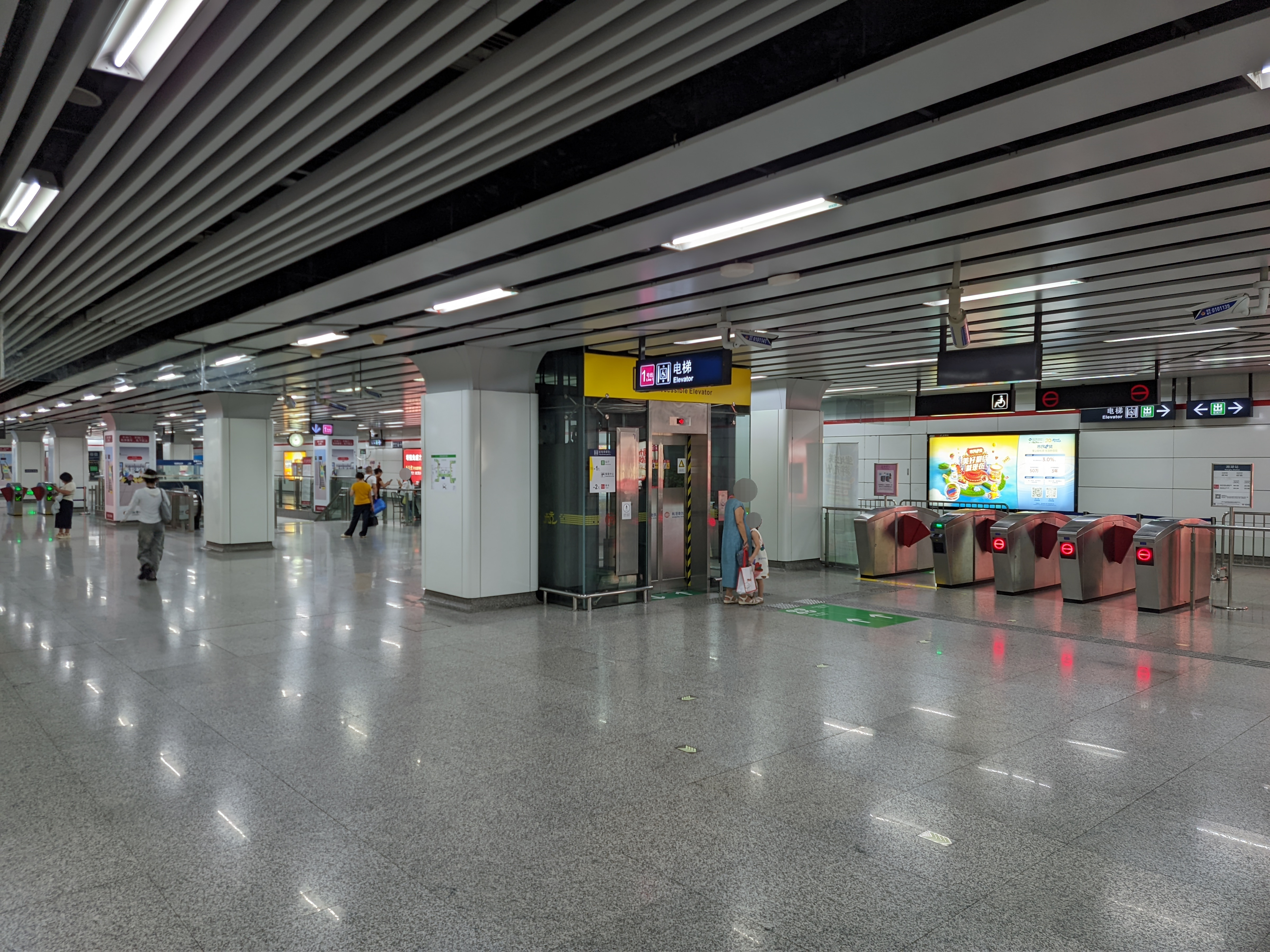
Concourse

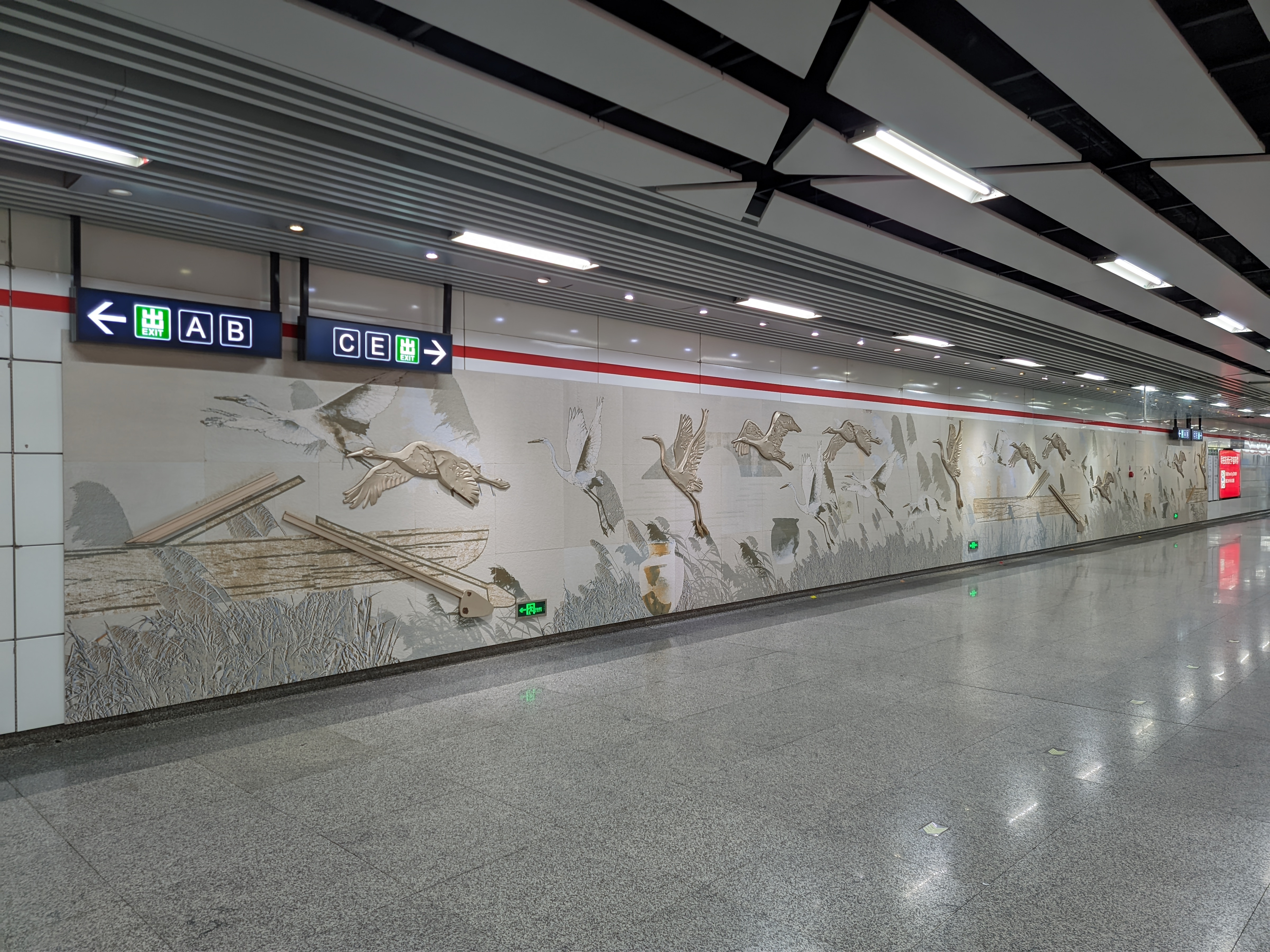
Art wall

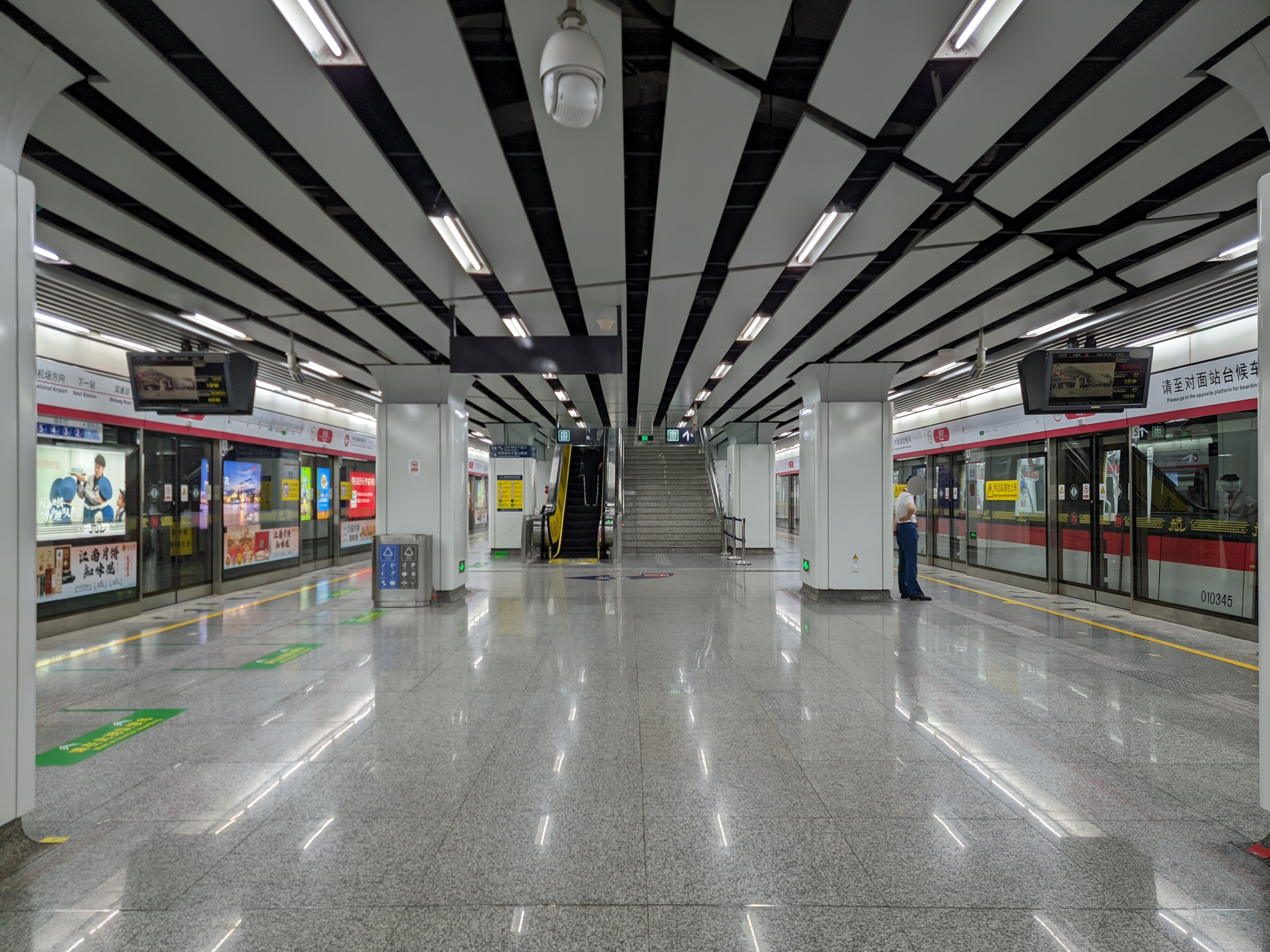
Platforms

== Entrances/exits ==
- A: Fengqing Avenue
- B: Fengqing Avenue
- C: Xiangxi Road, Xianghu Depot
- E: Xiuboyuan community (zone 3)
