= Wulin Square =

Square in Hangzhou, China

Coordinates: 30°16′24″N 120°09′31″E

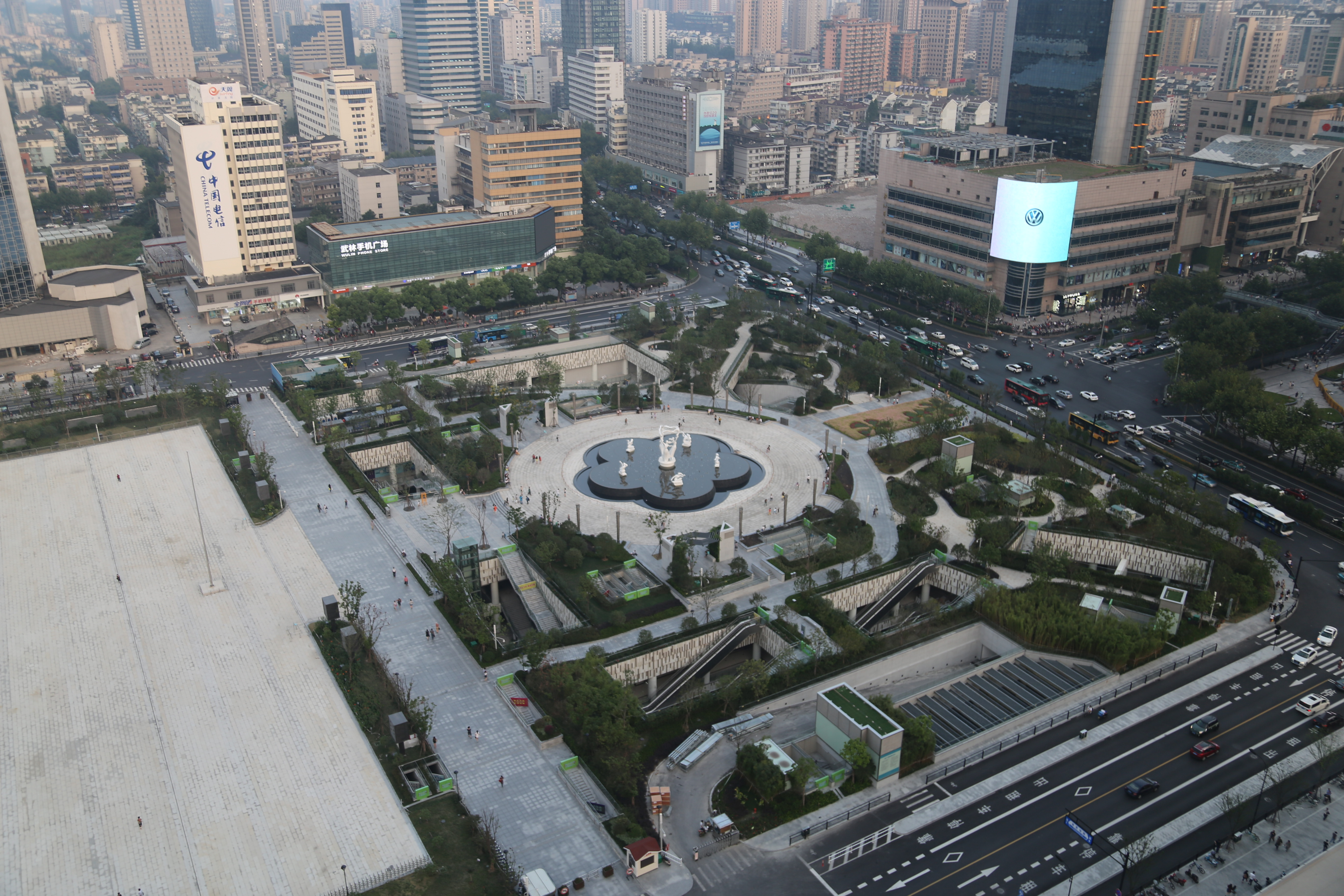
Wulin Square in 2016

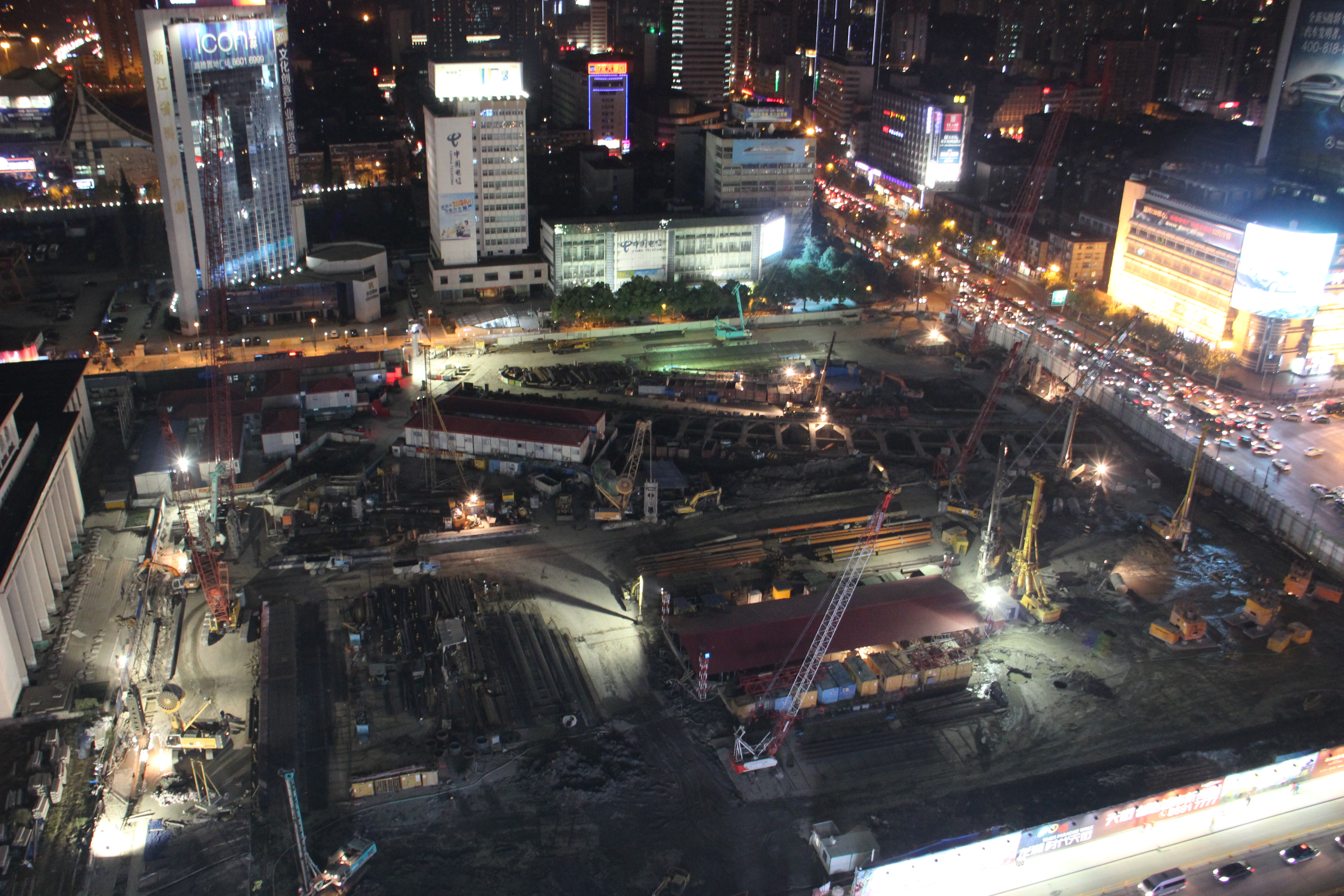
Construction site at Wulin Square, 2013

Wulin Square (Chinese: 武林广场) is a square in the Xiacheng District of Hangzhou. It is served by the Wulin Square Station of the Hangzhou Metro.
