= Longxiangqiao station =

Hangzhou Metro station

Coordinates: 30°15′25″N 120°09′34″E

Longxiangqiao 龙翔桥
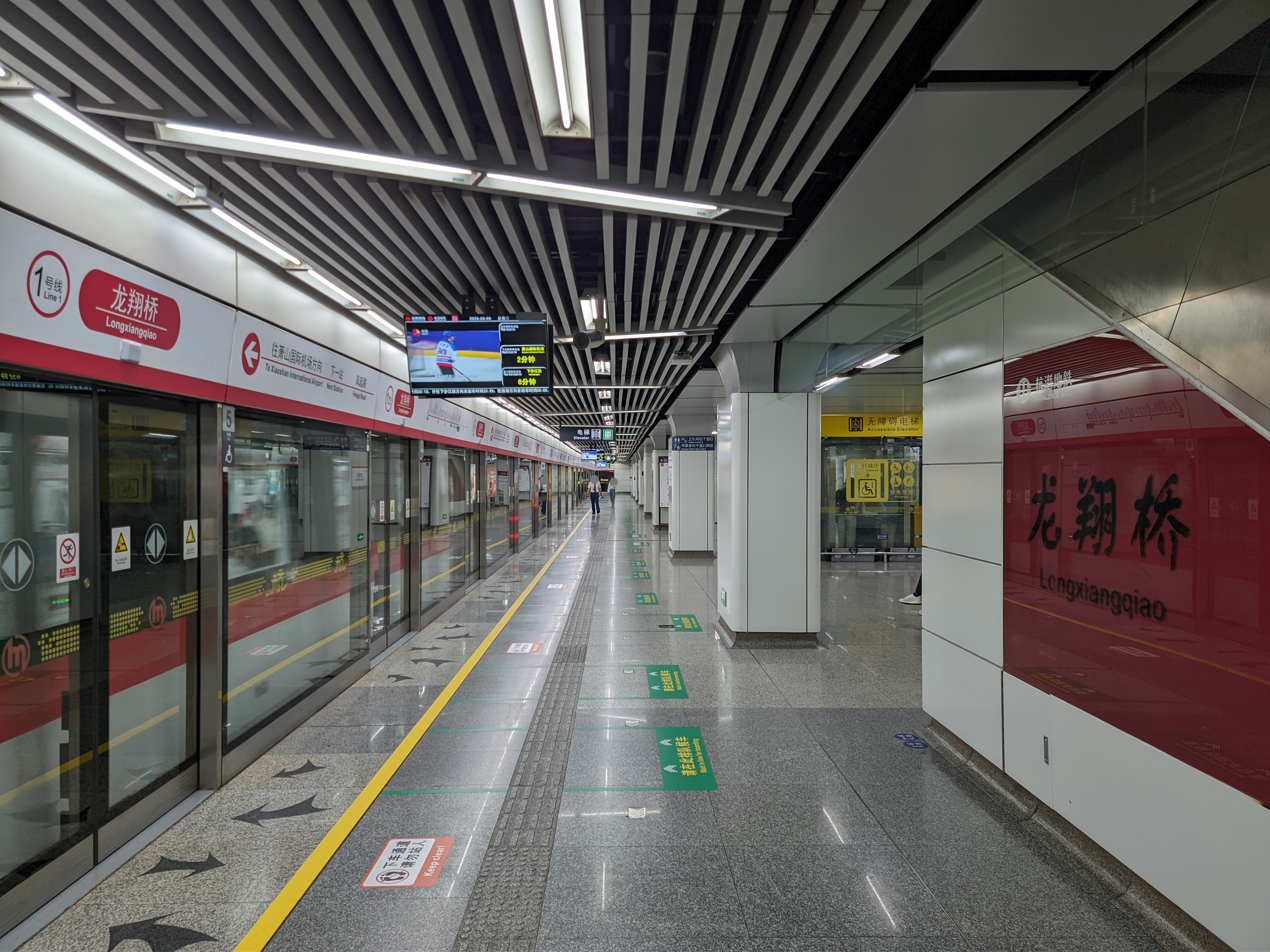
- Platform

General information
- Location: Shangcheng District, Hangzhou, Zhejiang; China
- Operator: Hangzhou Metro Corporation
- Line: Line 1

History
- Opened: November 2012; 13 years ago

Services
Preceding station	Hangzhou Metro	Following station
Ding'an Road towards Xianghu	Line 1	Fengqi Road towards Xiaoshan International Airport
Location

Longxiangqiao (Chinese: 龙翔桥) is a station on Line 1 of the Hangzhou Metro in China. It was opened in November 2012, together with the rest of the stations on Line 1. It is located in the Shangcheng District of Hangzhou. It is located next to West Lake in the Hubin business district, and a short walk away from the West Lake Musical Fountain. This station is very busy with tourists visiting West Lake, in fact it is the busiest single-line station in China.

== Overcrowding ==
Longxiangqiao was not designed to accommodate the large passenger volumes it handles today, as it is a standard-sized station. Additionally, it is located close to major shopping malls, West Lake, and the West Lake Musical Fountain. During peak tourism periods, especially after the dispersal of the crowd from the Musical Fountain, due to congestion, there are often situations where access is restricted and some entrances are temporarily closed to prevent overcrowding. When passenger volumes are extremely high, the subway company will temporarily operate extra "gap trains" from Longxiangqiao to Xiaoshan International Airport to relieve overcrowding.
