= Wulinmen station =

Metro station in Hangzhou, China

Wulinmen 武林门
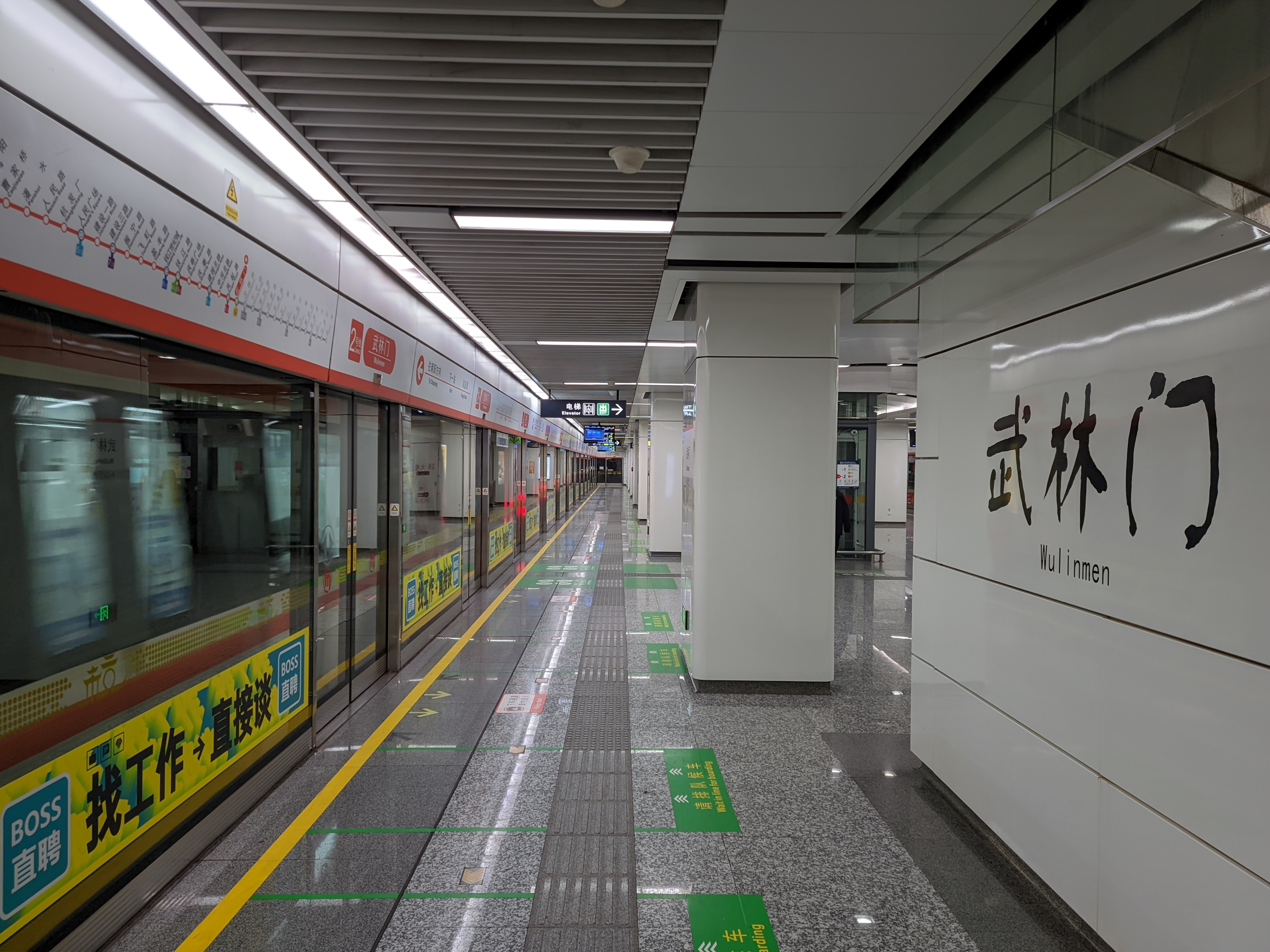
- Platforms of Line 2

General information
- Location: Xihu District, Hangzhou, Zhejiang; China
- Operated by: Hangzhou Metro Corporation
- Lines: Line 2 Line 3
- Platforms: 4 (2 island platform)

History
- Opened: July 3, 2017 (Line 2); July 20, 2022 (Line 3)

Services
Preceding station	Hangzhou Metro	Following station
Fengqi Road towards Chaoyang	Line 2	Shentangqiao towards Liangzhu
Huanglong Cave towards Wushanqiancun or Shima	Line 3	Wulin Square towards Xingqiao
Location

Wulinmen (Chinese: 武林门) is a metro station on Line 2 of Hangzhou Metro in China. It is located in Xihu District. This station has become an interchange station between Line 2 and Line 3 when the station of Line 3 was opened on 20 July 2022.

== Gallery ==
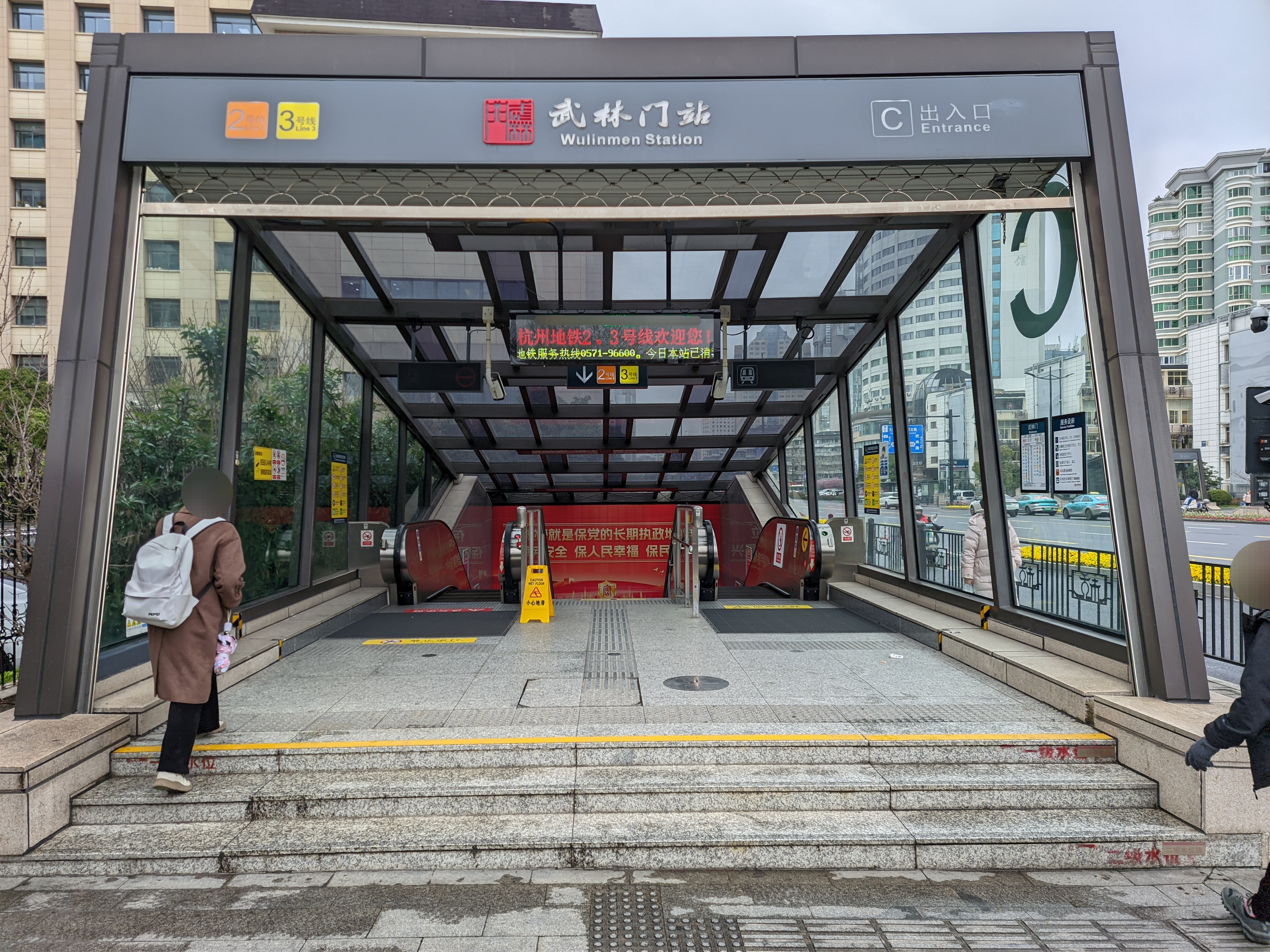
Entrance C

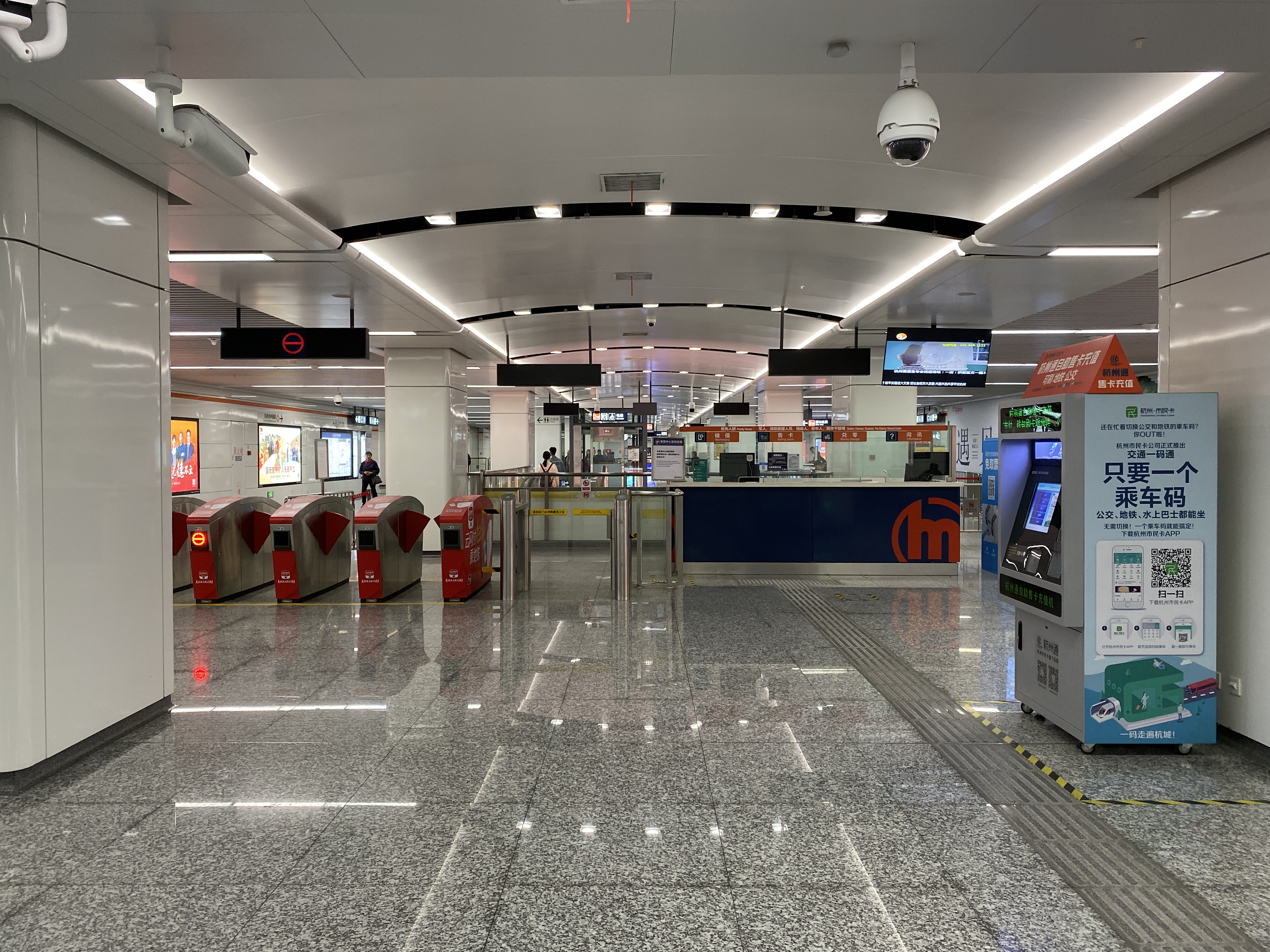
Concourse of Line 2

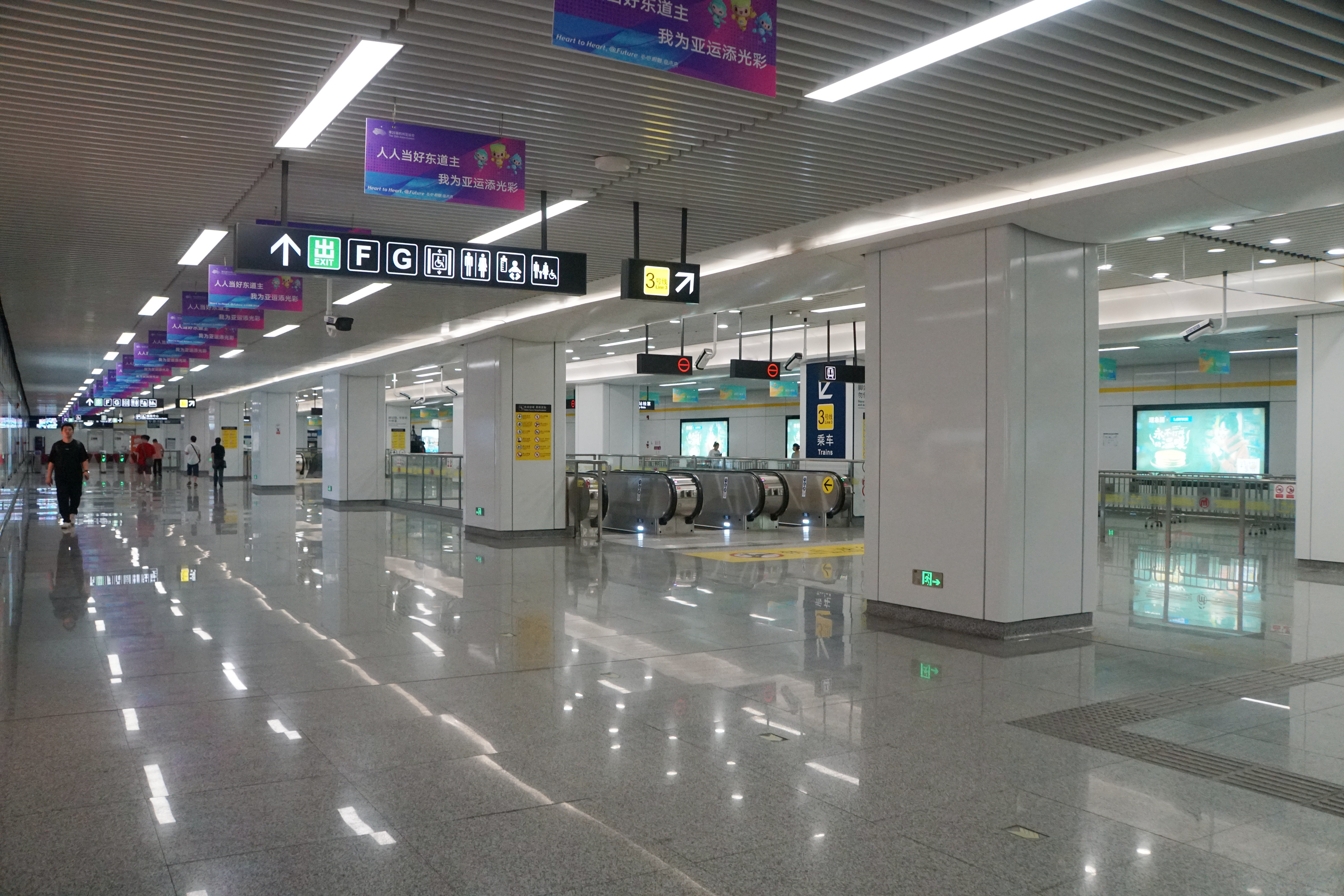
Concourse of Line 3

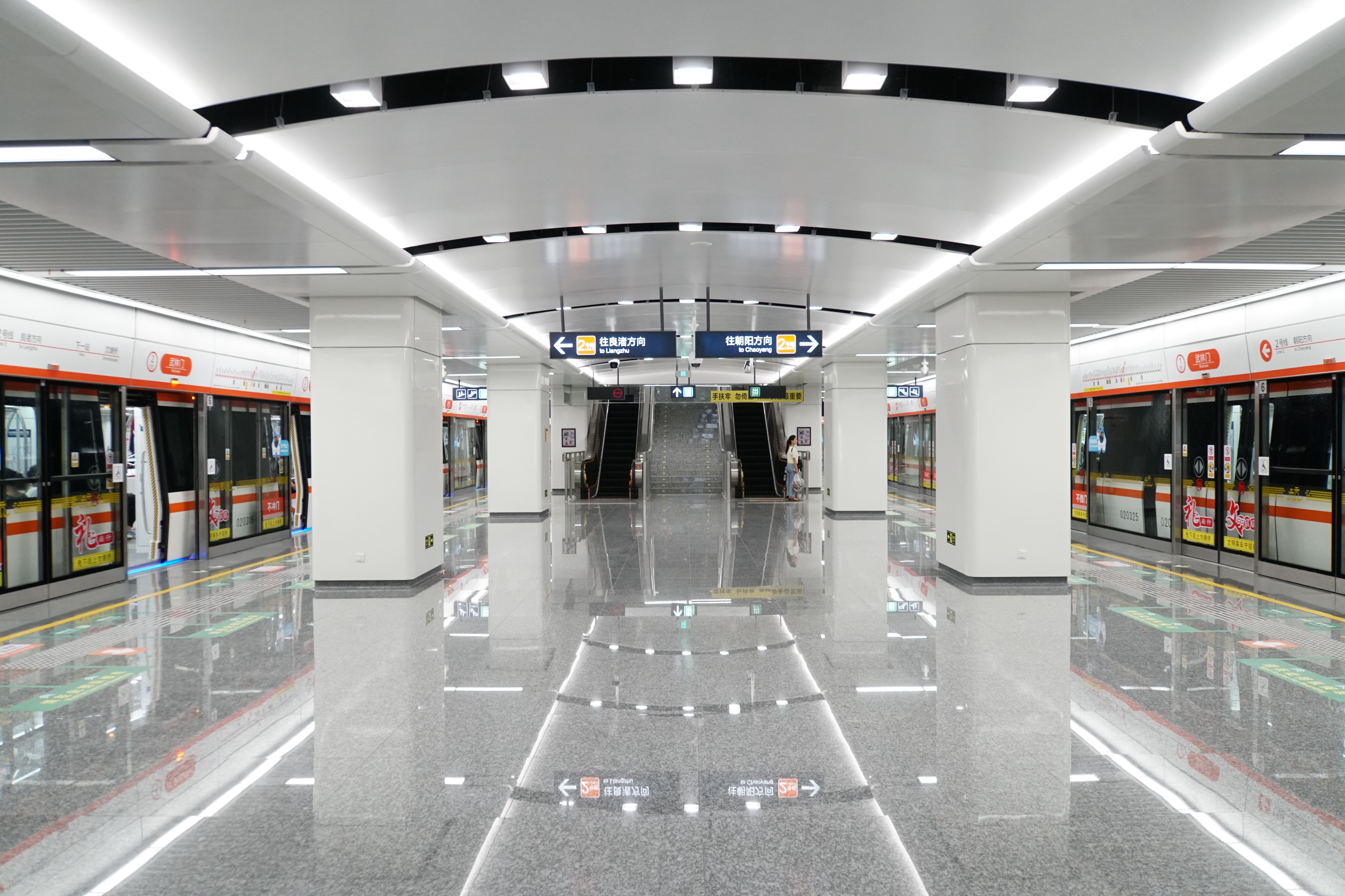
Platforms of Line 2

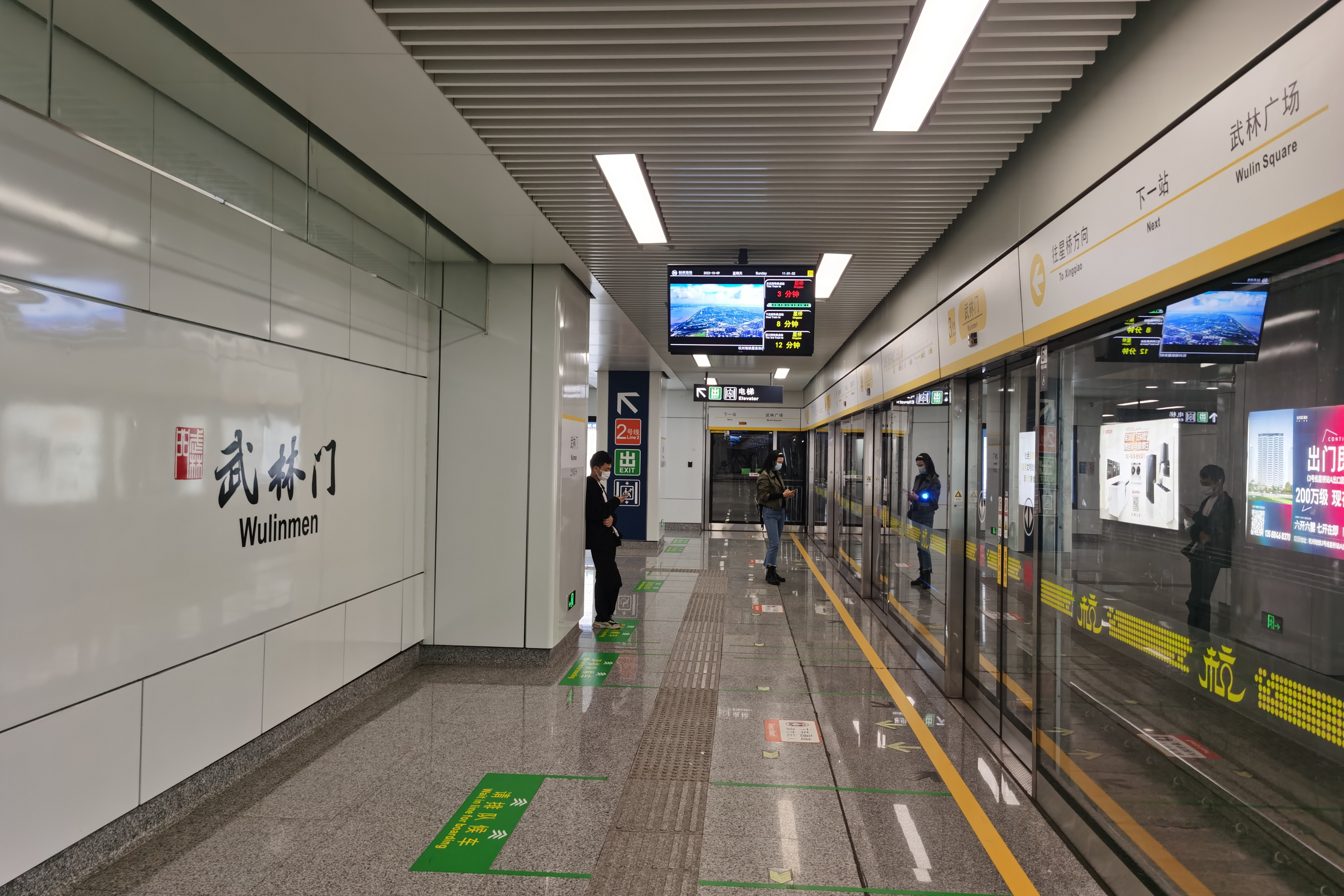
Platforms of Line 3
