= Fengqi Road station =

Hangzhou Metro station

Fengqi Road 凤起路
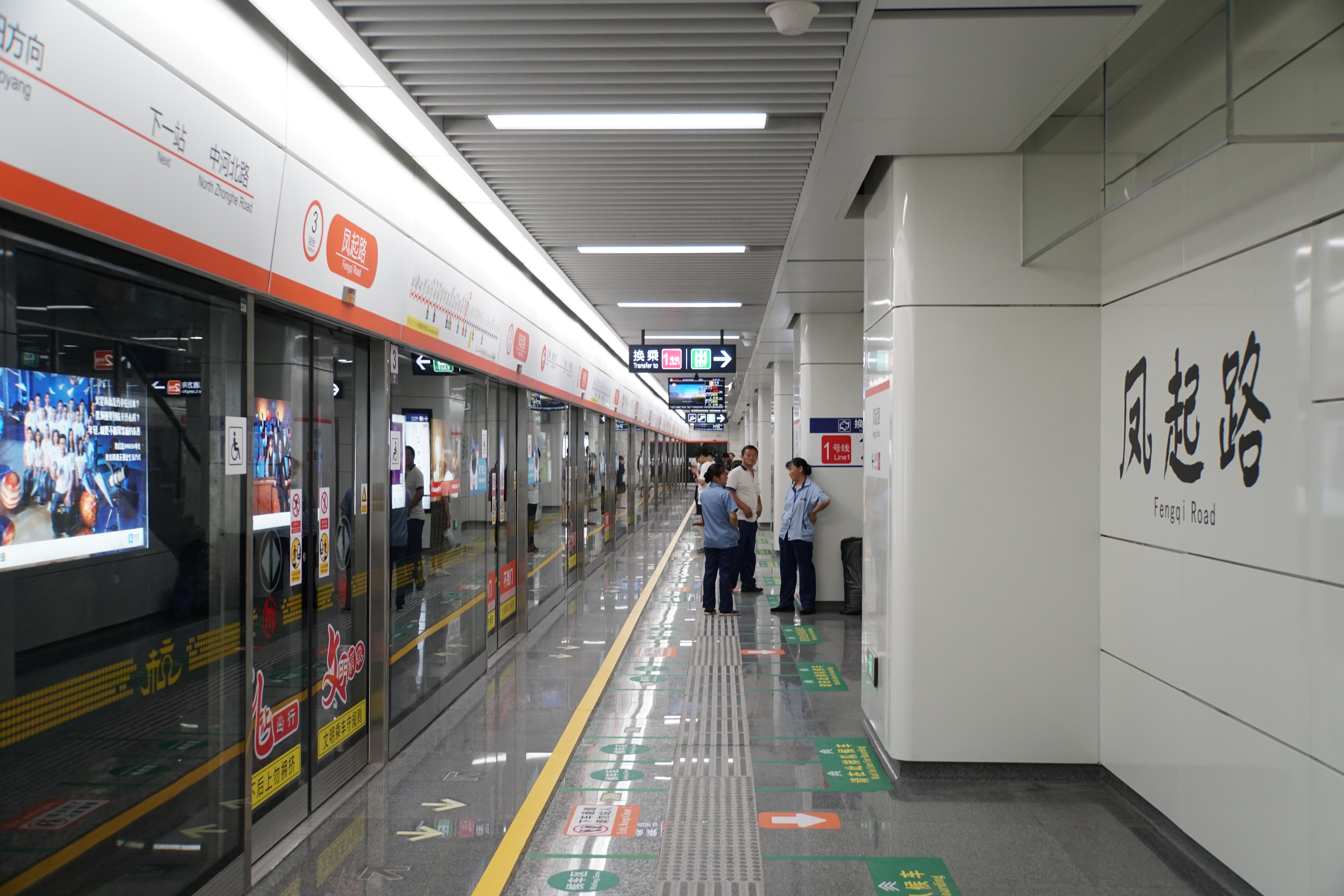
- Platforms of Line 2

General information
- Location: Gongshu District, Hangzhou, Zhejiang; China
- Coordinates: 30°15′50″N 120°09′33″E
- Operated by: Hangzhou Metro Corporation
- Lines: Line 1 Line 2

History
- Opened: 24 November 2012; 13 years ago (Line 1); 3 July 2017; 8 years ago (Line 2)

Services
Preceding station	Hangzhou Metro	Following station
Longxiangqiao towards Xianghu	Line 1	Wulin Square towards Xiaoshan International Airport
North Zhonghe Road towards Chaoyang	Line 2	Wulinmen towards Liangzhu
Location

Fengqi Road (Chinese: 凤起路) is an interchange station between Lines 1 and 2 of the Hangzhou Metro in China. Service on Line 1 commenced on 24 November 2012 along with the rest of the stations on Line 1, while service on Line 2 began on 3 July 2017. It is located in the Gongshu District of Hangzhou.
