= Wujiang Road station =

Hangzhou Metro station

Coordinates: 30°14′21″N 120°11′11″E

Wujiang Road 婺江路
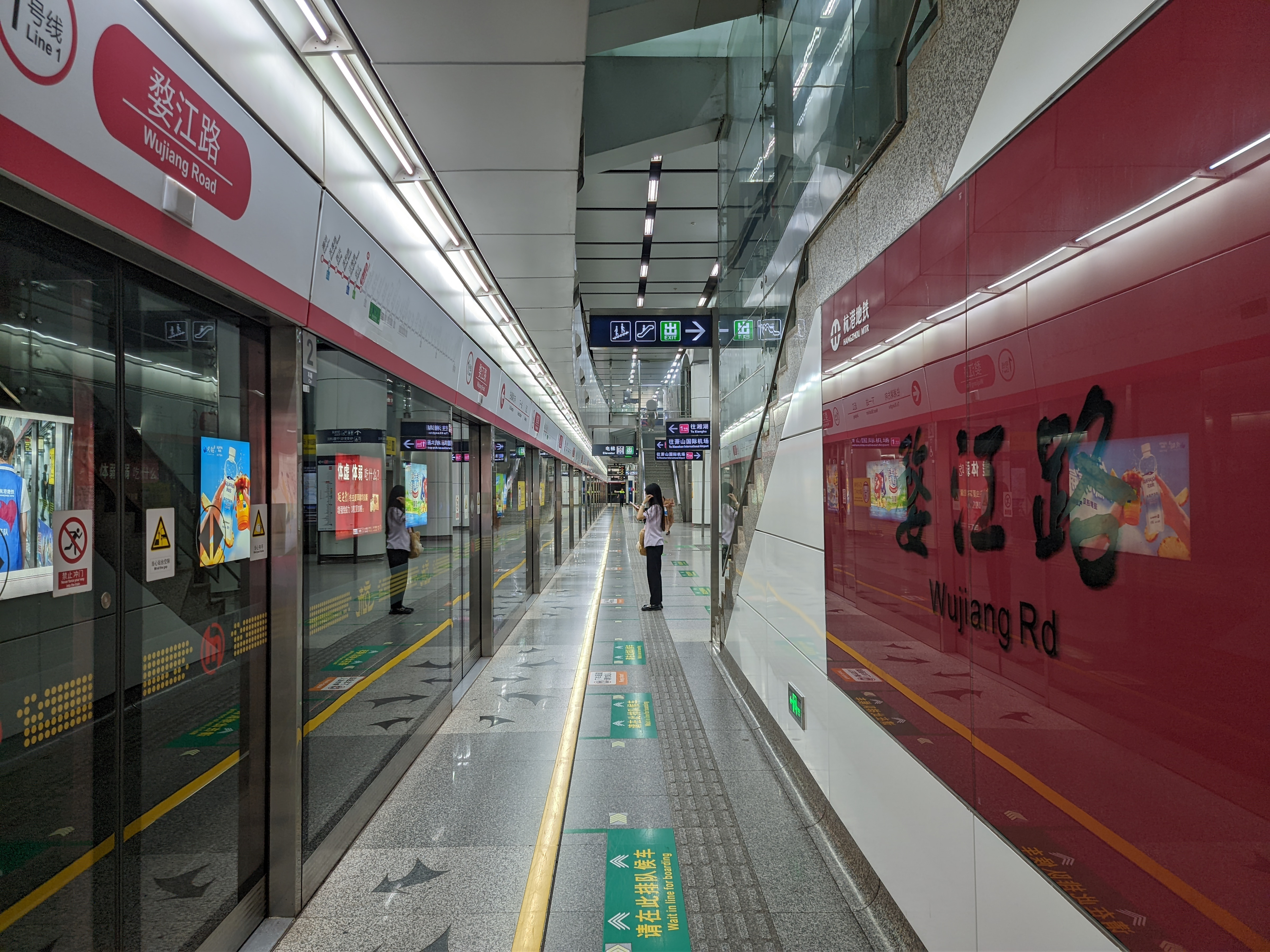
- Platform

General information
- Location: Wujiang Road × Qiutao Road; Shangcheng District, Hangzhou, Zhejiang; China
- Operated by: Hangzhou Metro Corporation
- Line: Line 1
- Platforms: 2 (1 island platform)

History
- Opened: November 24, 2012; 13 years ago

Services
Preceding station	Hangzhou Metro	Following station
Jinjiang towards Xianghu	Line 1	Chengzhan towards Xiaoshan International Airport
Location

Wujiang Road (Chinese: 婺江路) is a station on Line 1 of the Hangzhou Metro in China. It was opened in November 2012, together with the rest of the stations on Line 1. It is located in the Shangcheng District of Hangzhou.

== Station Layout ==
Ground		Exits
B1	Concourse	Tickets, Customer Service Center, Convenience Stores
B2	←	Line 1 towards Xianghu (Jinjiang)
B2	Island Platform, doors will open on the left
B2		Line 1 towards Xiaoshan International Airport (Chengzhan)

== Gallery ==
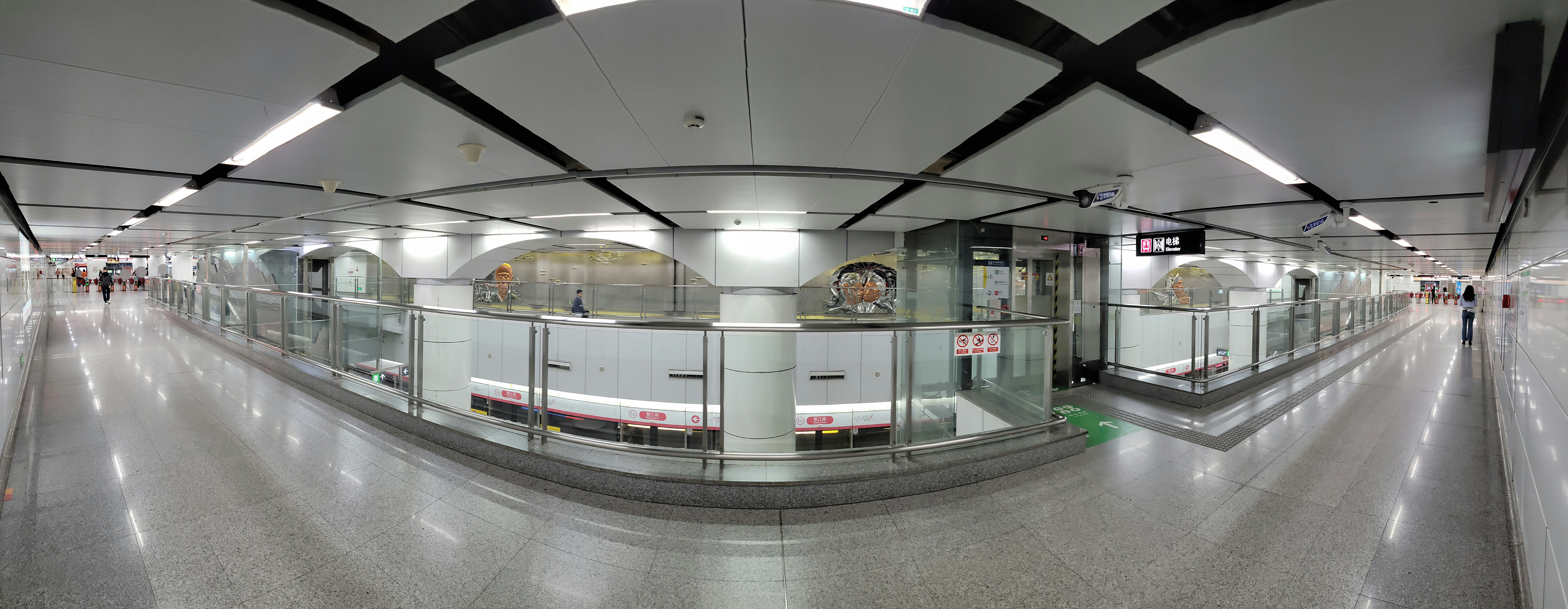
Panorama photo of concourse
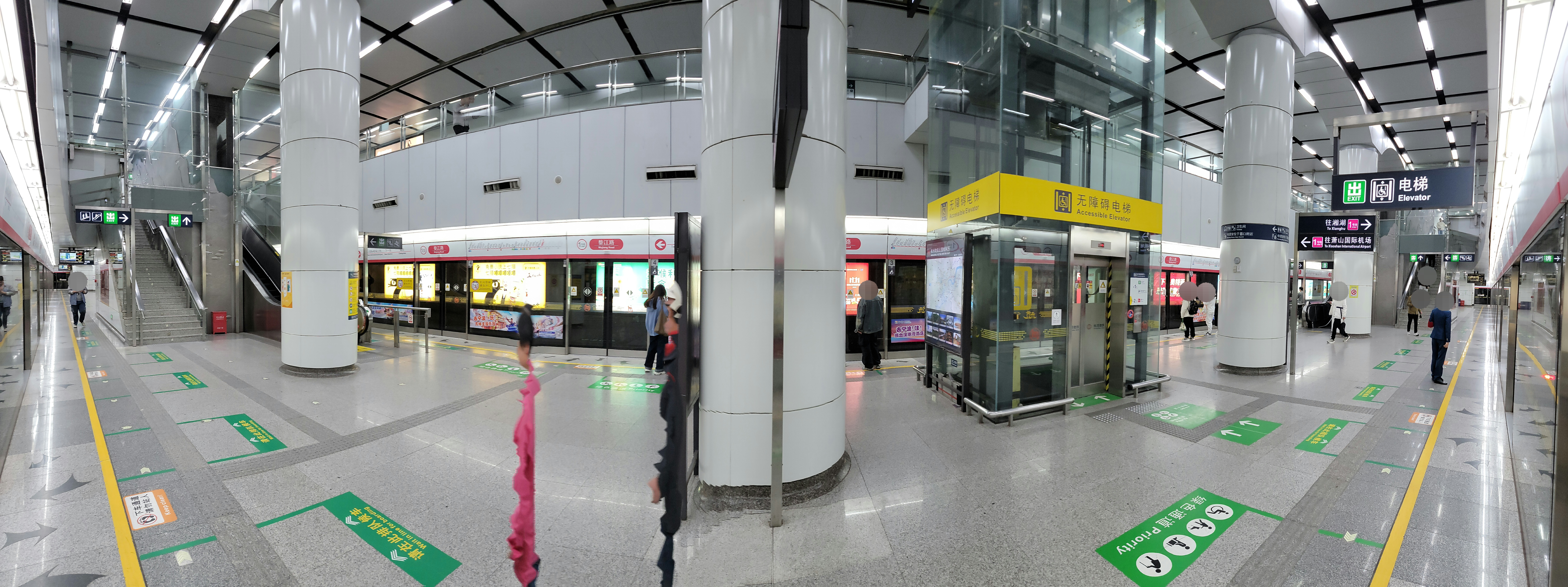
Panorama photo of platform
