= Wulin Square station =

Hangzhou Metro station

Wulin Square 武林广场
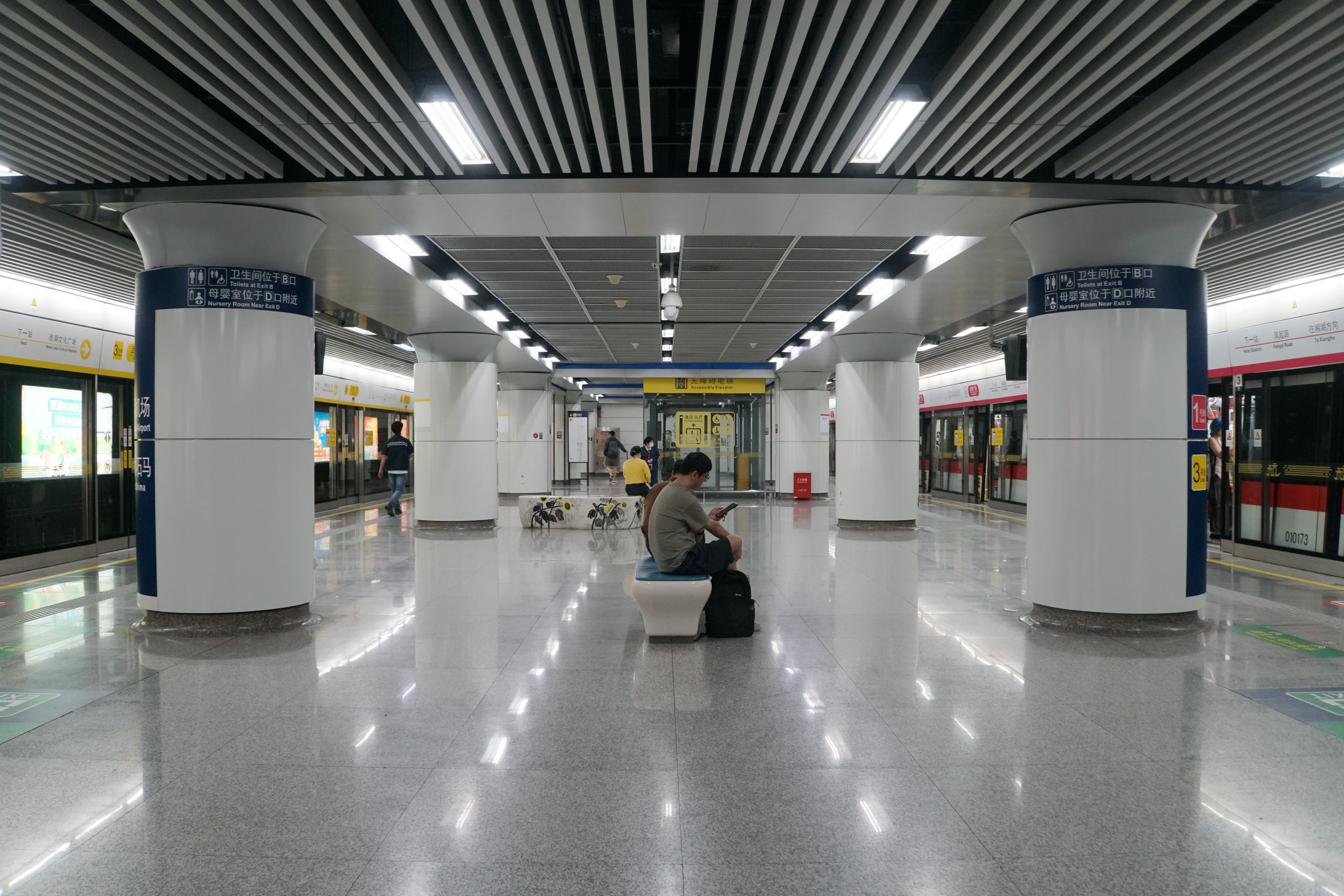
- B3F platform

General information
- Location: Wulin Square; Gongshu District, Hangzhou, Zhejiang; China
- Coordinates: 30°16′23″N 120°09′32″E
- System: Hangzhou metro station
- Operator: Hangzhou MTR Corporation (Line 1); Hangzhou Metro Corporation (Line 3)
- Lines: Line 1 Line 3
- Platforms: 4 (2 island platforms)

Construction
- Structure type: Underground
- Accessible: Yes

History
- Opened: 24 November 2012 (Line 1); 10 June 2022 (Line 3)

Services
Preceding station	Hangzhou Metro	Following station
Fengqi Road towards Xianghu	Line 1	West Lake Cultural Square towards Xiaoshan International Airport
Wulinmen towards Wushanqiancun or Shima	Line 3	West Lake Cultural Square towards Xingqiao
Location

Wulin Square (simplified Chinese: 武林广场; traditional Chinese: 武林廣場) is an interchange station between Line 1 and Line 3 of Hangzhou Metro in China. It was opened in November 2012, together with the rest of the stations on Line 1. It is located at Wulin Square in Gongshu District of Hangzhou. The station complex is one of the largest in Hangzhou with platforms that are wider than regular Hangzhou Metro stations and have provision for a paired cross-platform interchange with Line 3. In addition, the station is connected to a large underground mall.

== Station structure ==
An opposite direction cross-platform interchange is provided between Line 1 and Line 3.

G	Ground level	Exits A, B, E
B1	Concourse	Exit D, Tickets, Customer Service Center, Convenient store
B2		← Line 3 towards Wushanqiancun or Shima (Wulinmen)
B2	Island Platform, doors will open on the left
B2		Line 1 towards Xiaoshan International Airport (West Lake Cultural Square) →
B3		Line 3 towards Xingqiao (West Lake Cultural Square) →
B3	Island Platform, doors will open on the right
B3		← Line 1 towards Xianghu (Fengqi Road)

== Entrances/exits ==
- A: Hangzhou Center
- B: Huancheng Rd. (N)
- D: Wulin Square
- E: Tiyuchang Rd.
