= Ding'an Road station =

Hangzhou Metro station

Coordinates: 30°14′54″N 120°09′48″E

Ding'an Road 定安路
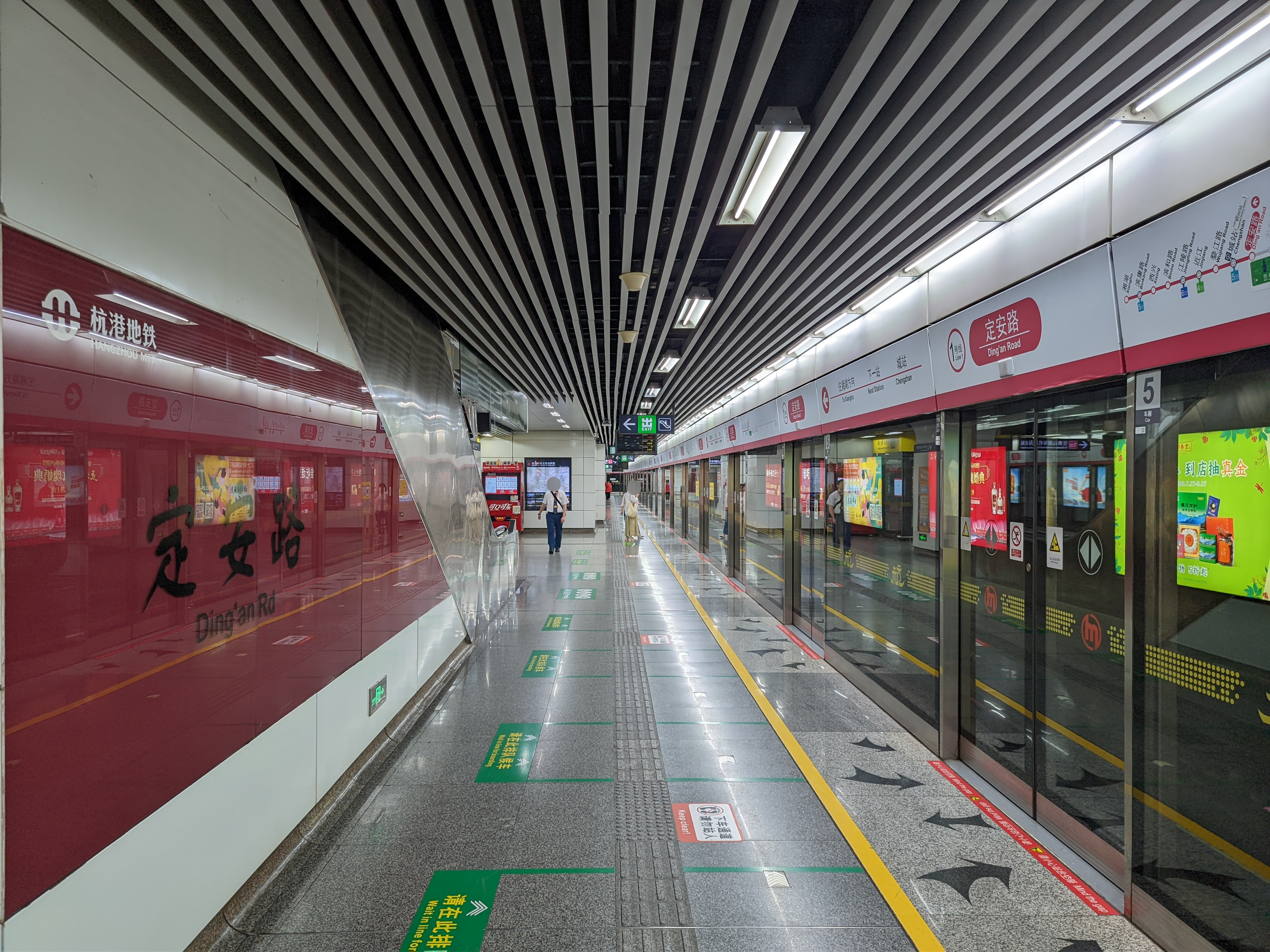
- Platform

General information
- Location: Shangcheng District, Hangzhou, Zhejiang; China
- Operated by: Hangzhou Metro Corporation
- Line: Line 1

History
- Opened: November 2012; 13 years ago

Services
Preceding station	Hangzhou Metro	Following station
Chengzhan towards Xianghu	Line 1	Longxiangqiao towards Xiaoshan International Airport
Location

Ding'an Road (Chinese: 定安路) is a station on Line 1 of the Hangzhou Metro in China. It was opened in November 2012, together with the rest of the stations on Line 1. It is located in the Shangcheng District of Hangzhou.
