= Jinjiang station =

Hangzhou Metro station

Jinjiang 近江
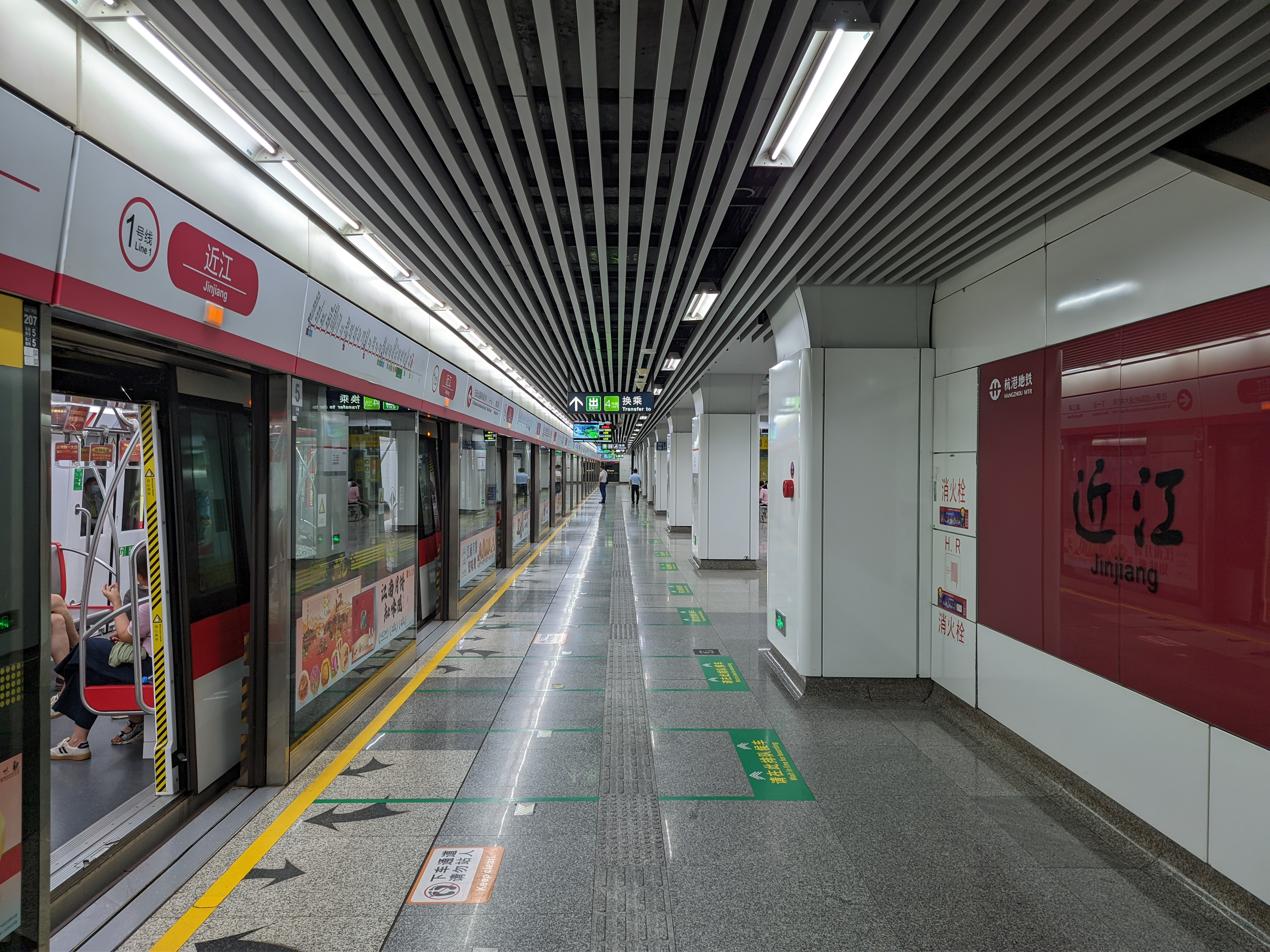
- Platform of Line 1

General information
- Location: Wujiang Road × Fuchun Road; Shangcheng District, Hangzhou, Zhejiang; China
- Coordinates: 30°13′59″N 120°11′36″E
- System: Hangzhou Metro
- Operated by: Hangzhou MTR Corporation; Hangzhou Metro Corporation
- Lines: Line 1 Line 4
- Platforms: 4 (2 island platforms)

History
- Opened: Line 1: 24 November 2012; Line 4: 2 February 2015

Services
Preceding station	Hangzhou Metro	Following station
Jiangling Road towards Xianghu	Line 1	Wujiang Road towards Xiaoshan International Airport
Yongjiang Road towards Puyan	Line 4	Chengxing Road towards Chihua Street
Route map
Location

Jinjiang (Chinese: 近江) is a transfer station on Line 1 and Line 4 of the Hangzhou Metro in China. It was opened in November 2012, together with the rest of the stations on Line 1. It is located in the Shangcheng District of Hangzhou.

== Station layout ==
Jinjiang has three levels: a concourse, and separate levels for lines 1 and 4. Basement 2 is for line 4, and basement 3 is for line 1. Each of these consists of an island platform with two tracks.

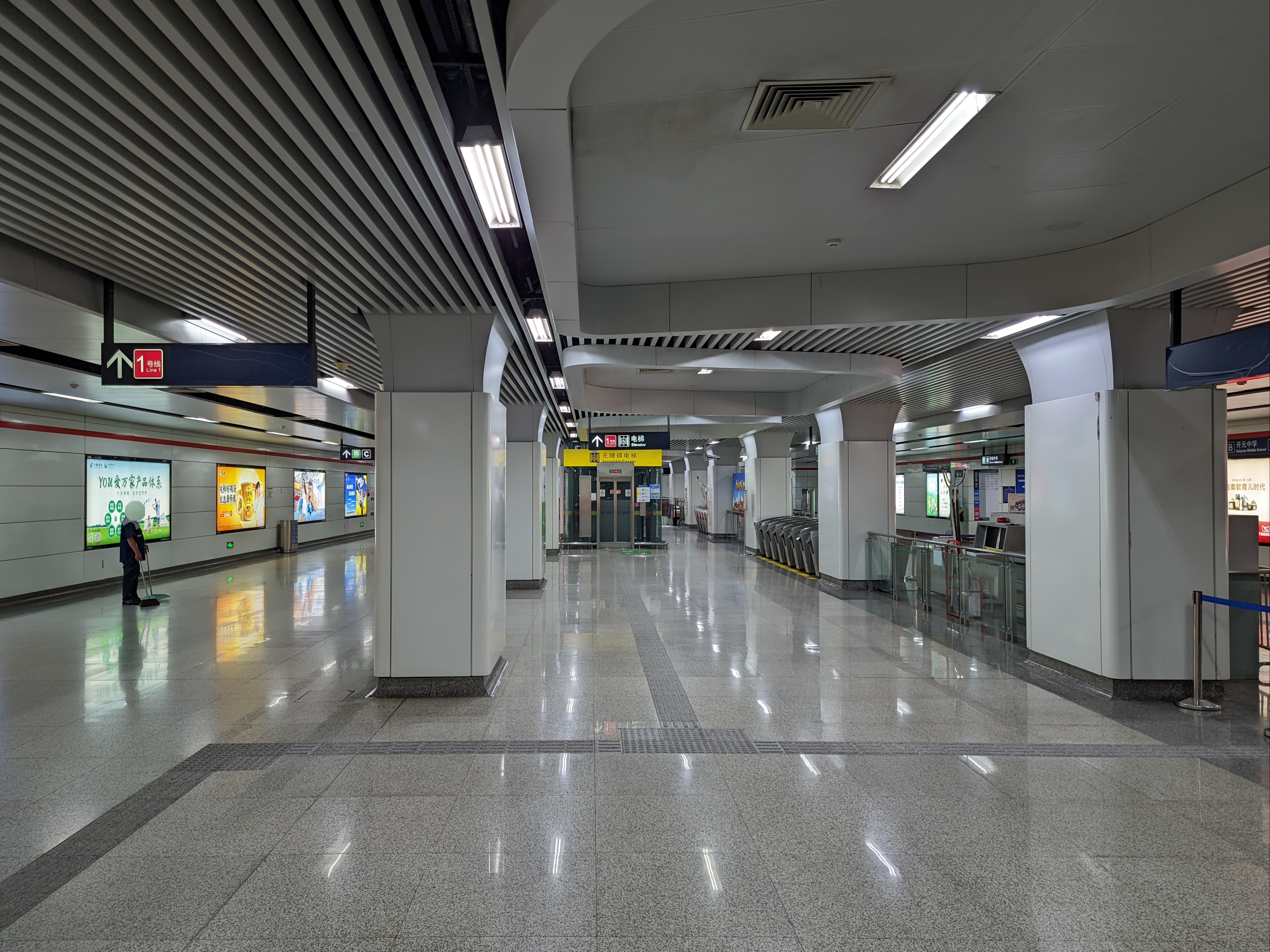
Concourse of Line 1

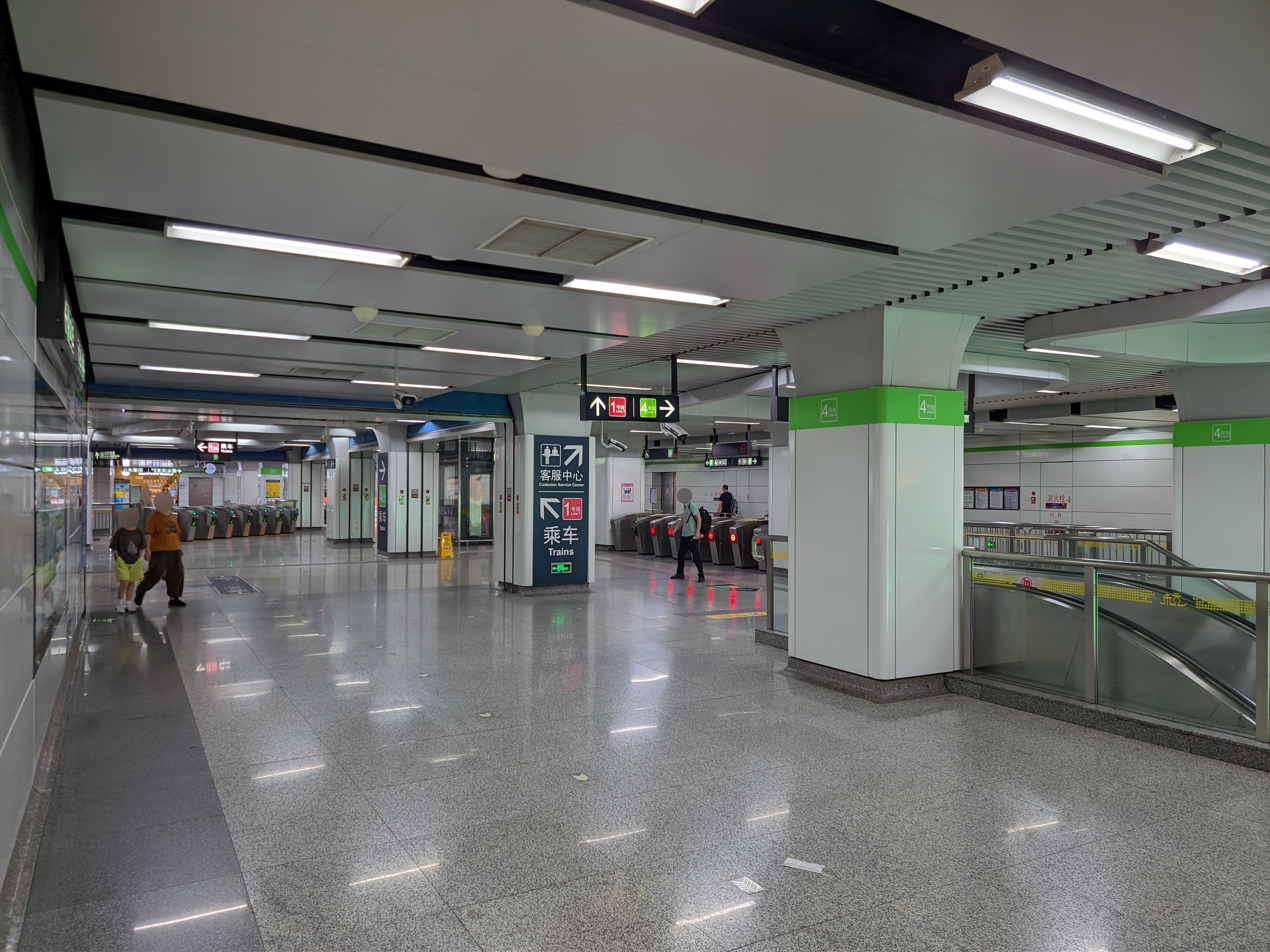
Concourse of Line 4

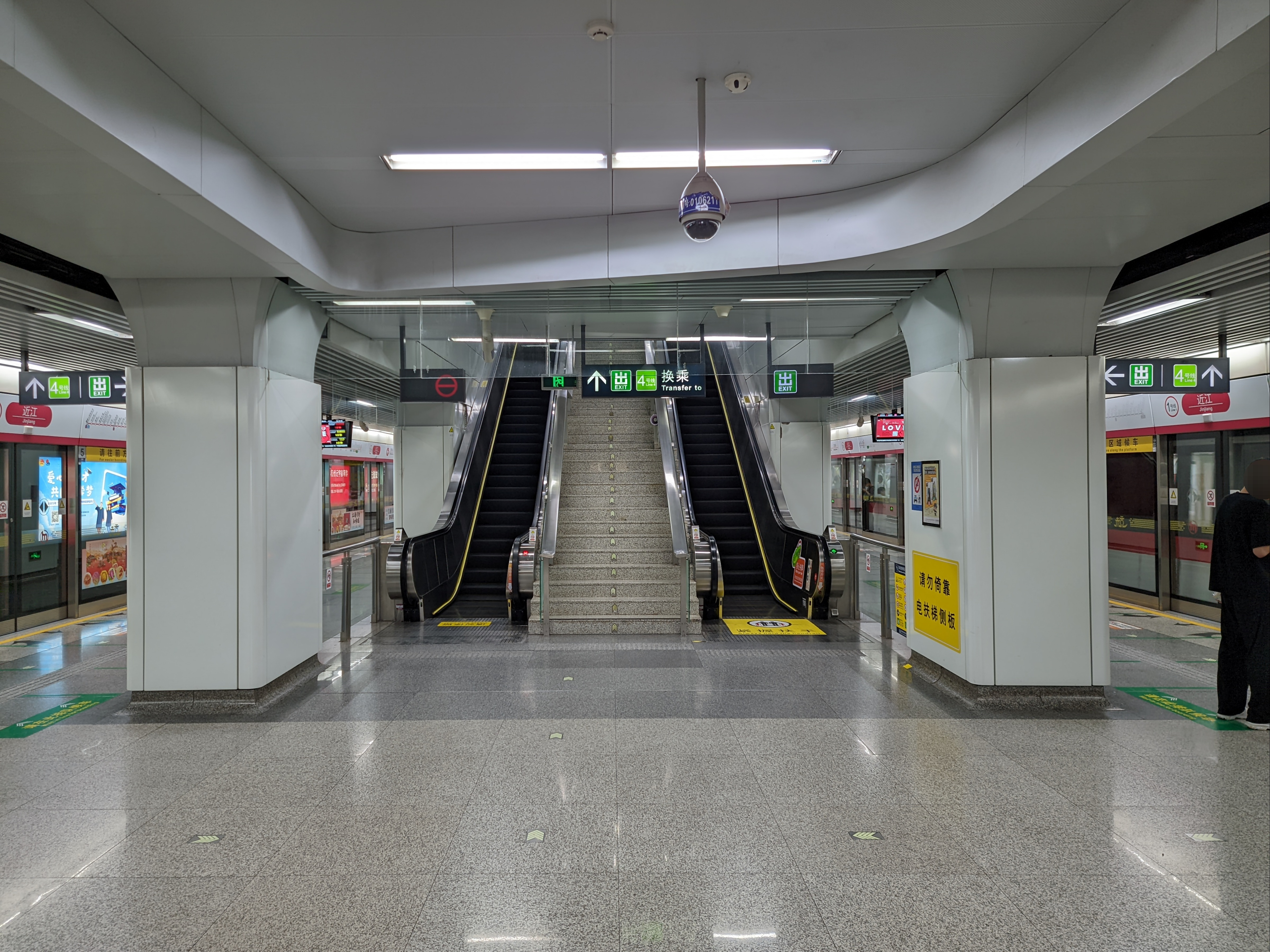
Platforms of Line 1

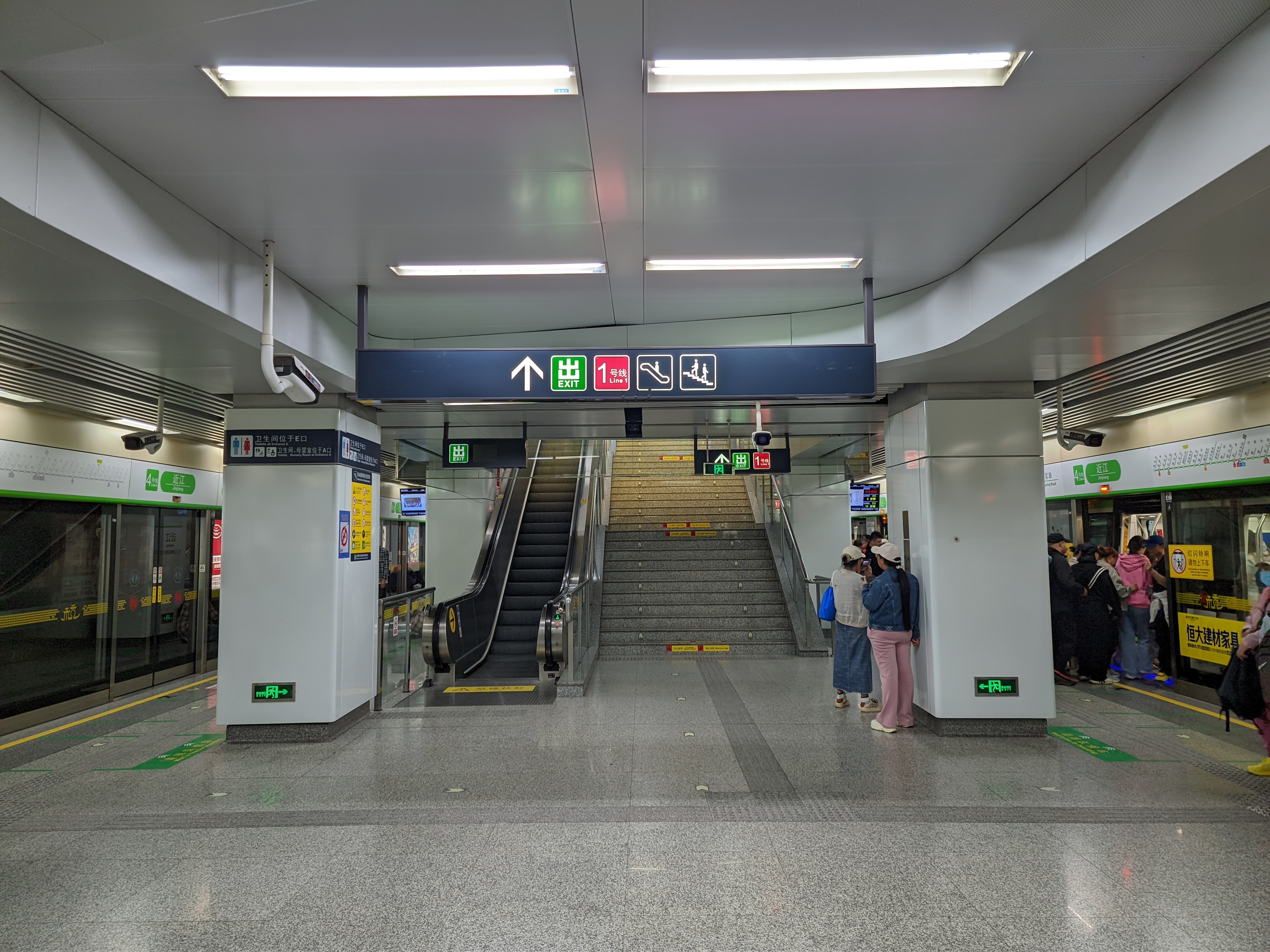
Platforms of Line 4

== Entrances/exits ==
Jinjiang has five exits, and a non-label exit to the Jinjiang Times Building, which was labelled as C1 before 2021.

- A: Fuchun Rd.
- B: Kaiyuan Middle School
- C2: Hangzhou Women Recreational Center
- D: Jinjiang Group Industrial Zone
- E: Hangzhou Maternity Hospital
