= Chengzhan station =

Hangzhou Metro station in China

Chengzhan 城站
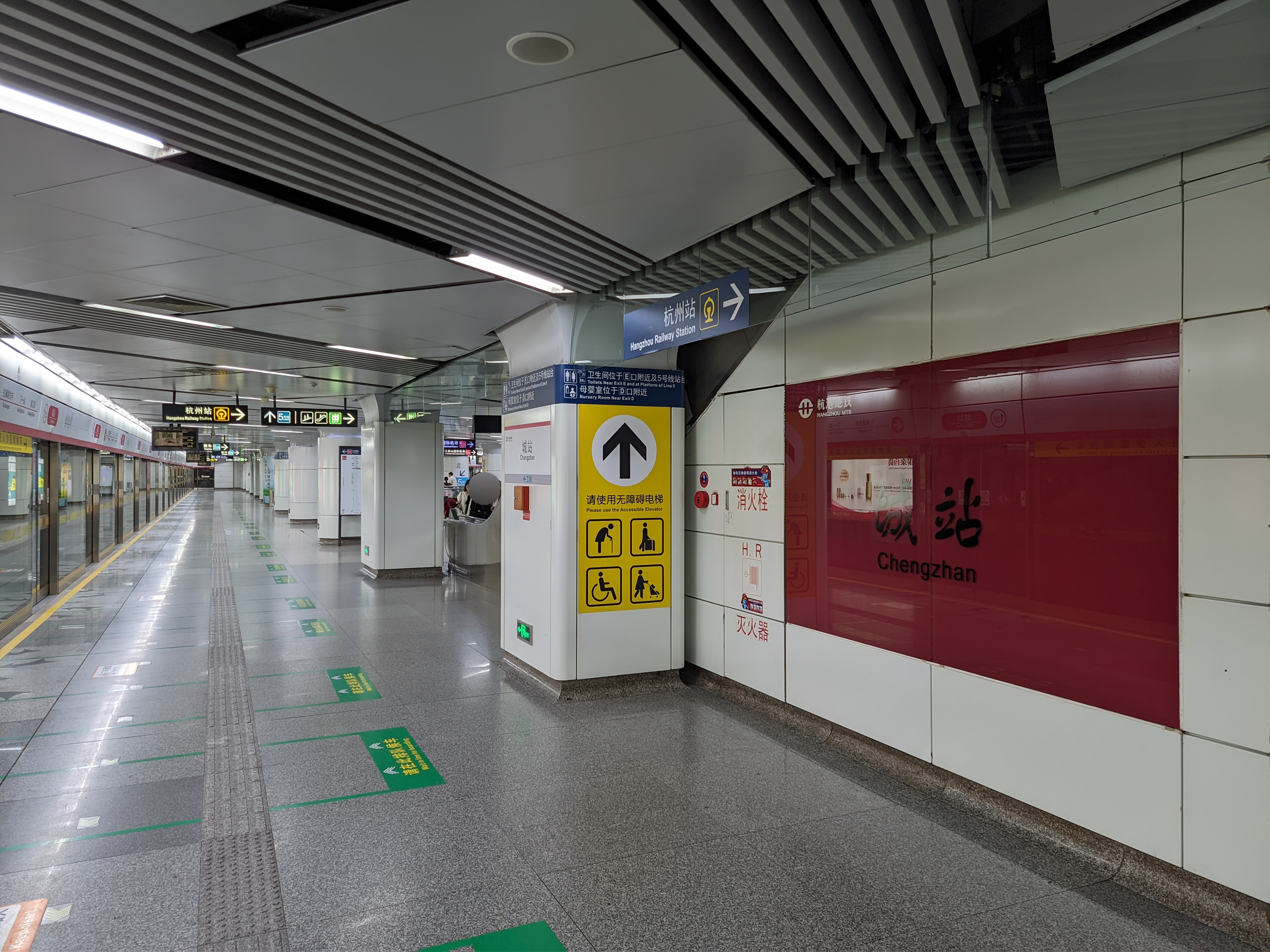
- Line 1 platforms

General information
- Location: Hangzhou Railway Station Square; Shangcheng District, Hangzhou, Zhejiang; China
- Coordinates: 30°14′49″N 120°10′34″E
- System: Hangzhou Metro
- Operated by: Hangzhou MTR Corporation; Hangzhou MTR Line 5 Corporation
- Lines: Line 1 Line 5
- Platforms: 4 (2 island platforms)
- Connections: Hangzhou railway station

Construction
- Structure type: Underground
- Accessible: Yes

History
- Opened: Line 1: November 24, 2012; Line 5: April 23, 2020

Services
Preceding station	Hangzhou Metro	Following station
Wujiang Road towards Xianghu	Line 1	Ding'an Road towards Xiaoshan International Airport
Wan'an Bridge towards East Nanhu	Line 5	Jiangcheng Road towards Guniangqiao
Location

Chengzhan (a.k.a. City Station, Chinese: 城站), subtitled as Hangzhou Railway Station on strip maps, is a station on Line 1 and Line 5 of the Hangzhou Metro in China. It is located by Hangzhou railway station. It was opened in November 2012, together with the rest of the stations on Line 1. Line 5 was opened on 23 April 2020, which also pass this station. It is located in the Shangcheng District of Hangzhou.

== Station layout ==
Chengzhan has three levels: a concourse, and separate levels for lines 1 and 5.Basement 2 is for line 1, and basement 3 is for line 5. Each of these consists of an island platform with two tracks.

== Entrances/exits ==
Chengzhan has 6 exits. The accessible facility (elevator) is at the middle of the line 1 concourse.

- A1: Hangzhou Railway Station (Railway Tickets)
- A2: Hangzhou Railway Station (Railway Arrivals)
- A3: Hangzhou Railway Station (Railway Departures)
- C: Chengzhan Road
- D: Xihu Avenue
- E: Hangzhou Railway Station Square

== Gallery ==
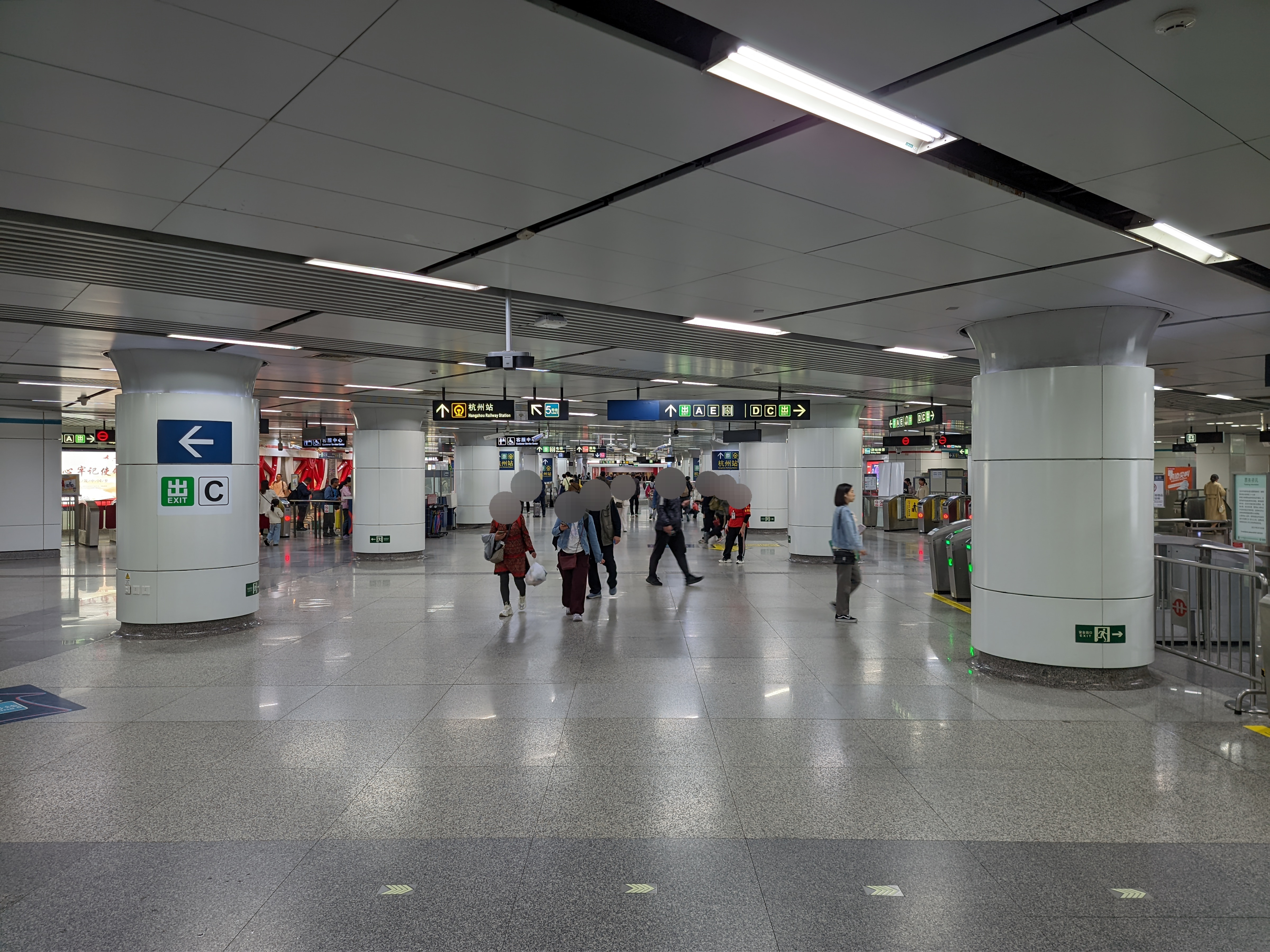
Concourse

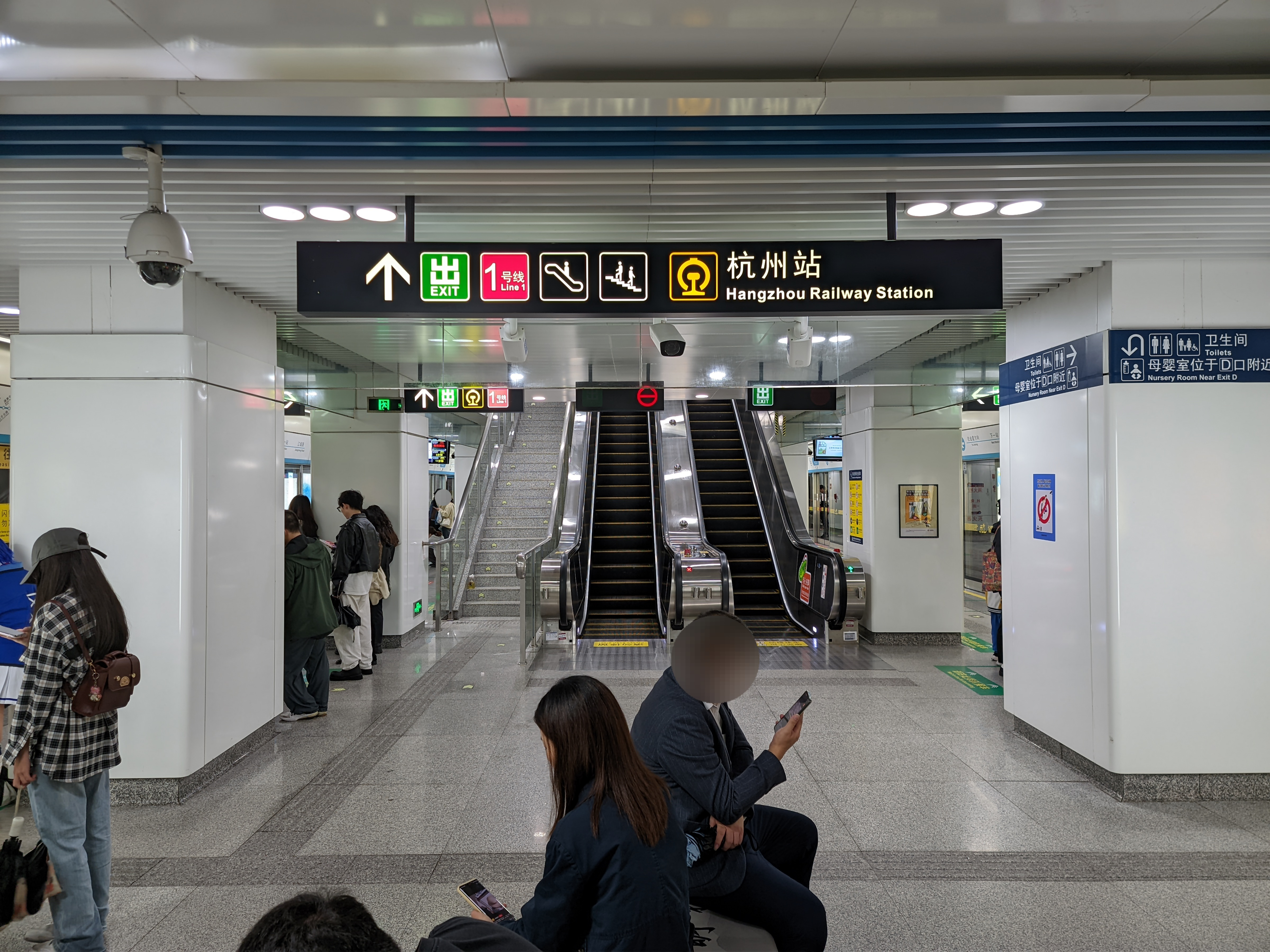
Line 5 platforms

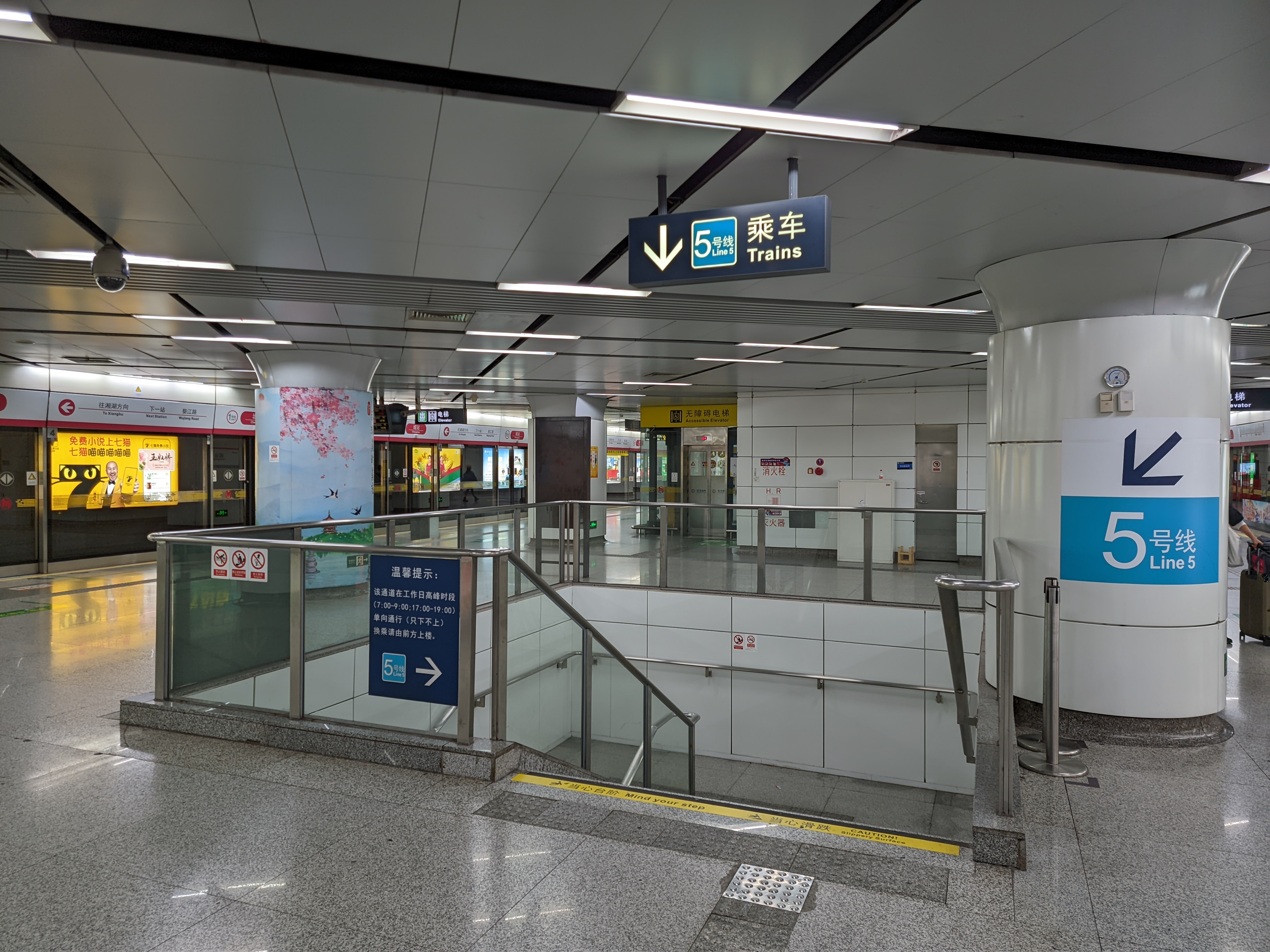
Stairs to Line 5 on Line 1 platform

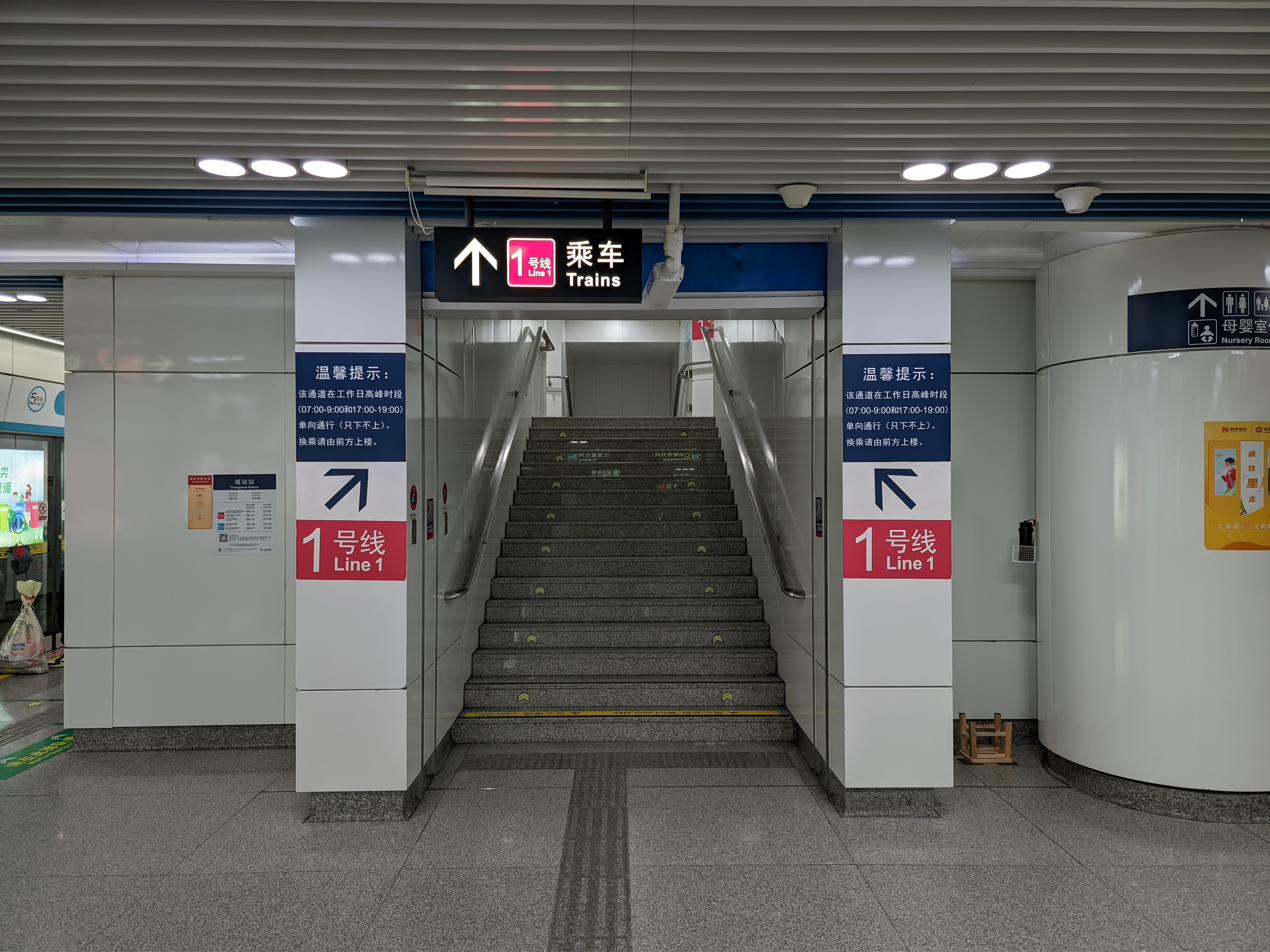
Stairs to Line 1 on Line 5 platform
