= Jinji Road station =

Jinji Road station may refer to:

- Jinji Road station (Hangzhou Metro), a metro station in Hangzhou, China
- Jinji Road station (Shanghai Metro), a metro station in Shanghai, China

== See also ==
- Jinjing Road station, Shanghai Metro
