= Jianghan Road station =

Jianghan Road station may refer to:

- Jianghan Road station (Wuhan Metro)
- Jianghan Road station (Hangzhou Metro)
