= Binkang Road station =

Metro station in Binjiang, Hangzhou

Binkang Road 滨康路
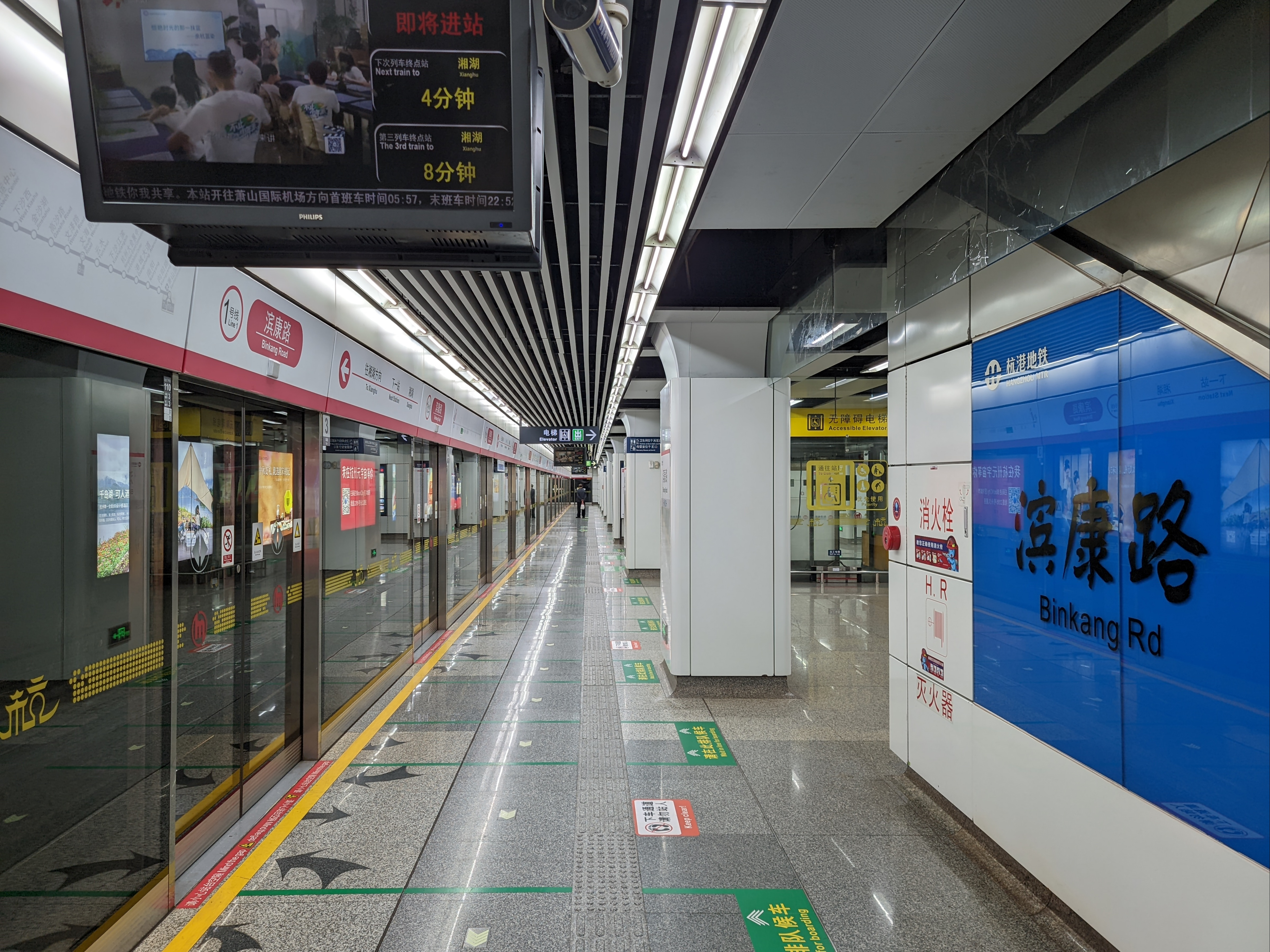
- Platform of Line 1

General information
- Location: Bin'an Road × Fengqing Avenue × Binkang Road; Binjiang District, Hangzhou, Zhejiang; China
- Coordinates: 30°11′10″N 120°13′36″E
- System: Hangzhou Metro
- Operated by: Hangzhou MTR Corporation; Hangzhou MTR Line 5 Corporation
- Lines: Line 1 Line 5
- Platforms: 4 (2 island platforms)

Construction
- Structure type: Underground
- Accessible: Yes

History
- Opened: November 24, 2012; 13 years ago (Line 1); April 23, 2020; 5 years ago (Line 5)

Services
Preceding station	Hangzhou Metro	Following station
Xianghu Terminus	Line 1	Xixing towards Xiaoshan International Airport
Jianghui Road towards East Nanhu	Line 5	Bo'ao Road towards Guniangqiao
Location

Binkang Road (simplified Chinese: 滨康路; traditional Chinese: 濱康路) is a station on Line 1 and Line 5 of Hangzhou Metro in China. It was opened in November 2012, together with the rest of the stations on Line 1. On April 23, 2020, it became an interchange station for Line 5 and Line 1. It is located in Binjiang District, Hangzhou.

== Description ==
The station can be seen as two parts. The part of Line 1 is located on the south side of Bin'an Road with two levels: Basement 1 is the concourse and basement 2 is the platform. The part of Line 5 is located underground beneath Binkang Road with three levels: basement 1 is the concourse (though its actual elevation is slightly lower than the Line 1 concourse), and basement 3 is the platform. All of them are consist with an island platform with two tracks. Passengers can move between the two parts via passageways, both within and outside the paid areas.

== Entrances/exits ==
There are five entrances in use. Exits A and B belong to Line 1 and exit E, G and H belong to Line 5. Exits B and E are accessible via elevators.

- A: Fengqing Avenue
- B: Bin'an Road
- E: north side of Binkang Road
- G: south side of Binkang Road, Huyuan 3rd Road
- H: south side of Binkang Road, Fengqing Avenue

== Gallery ==
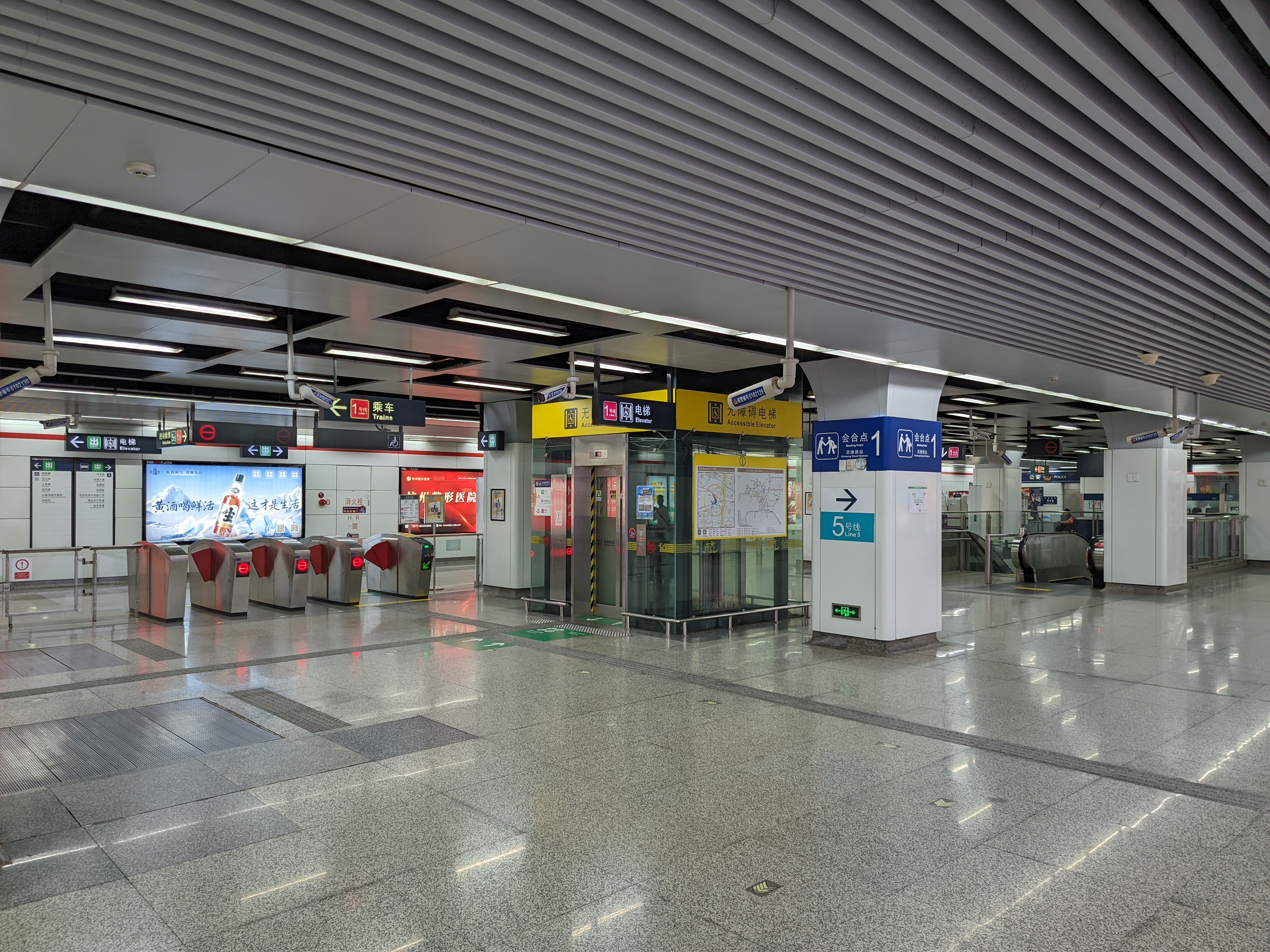
Line 1 concourse

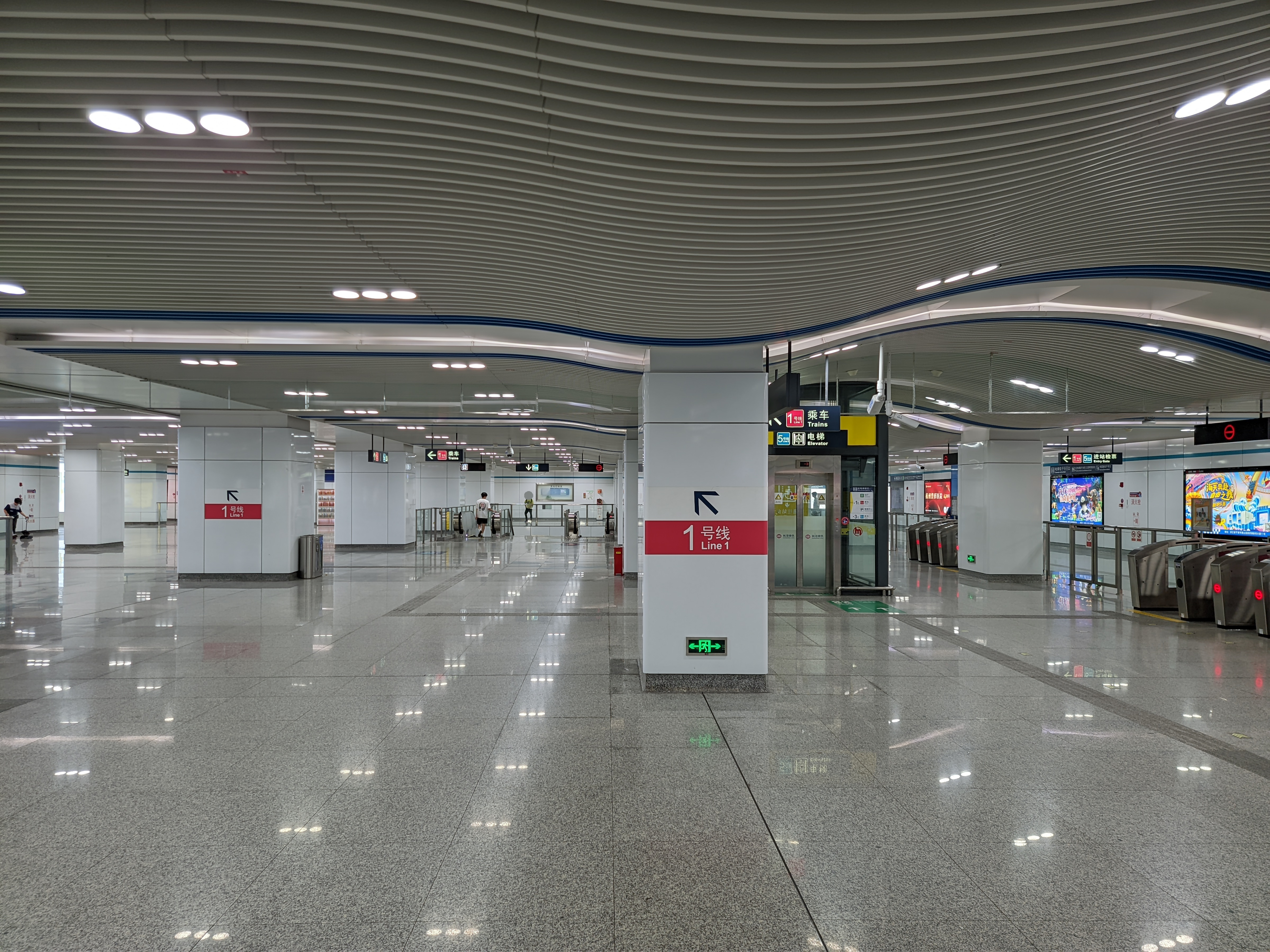
Line 5 concourse

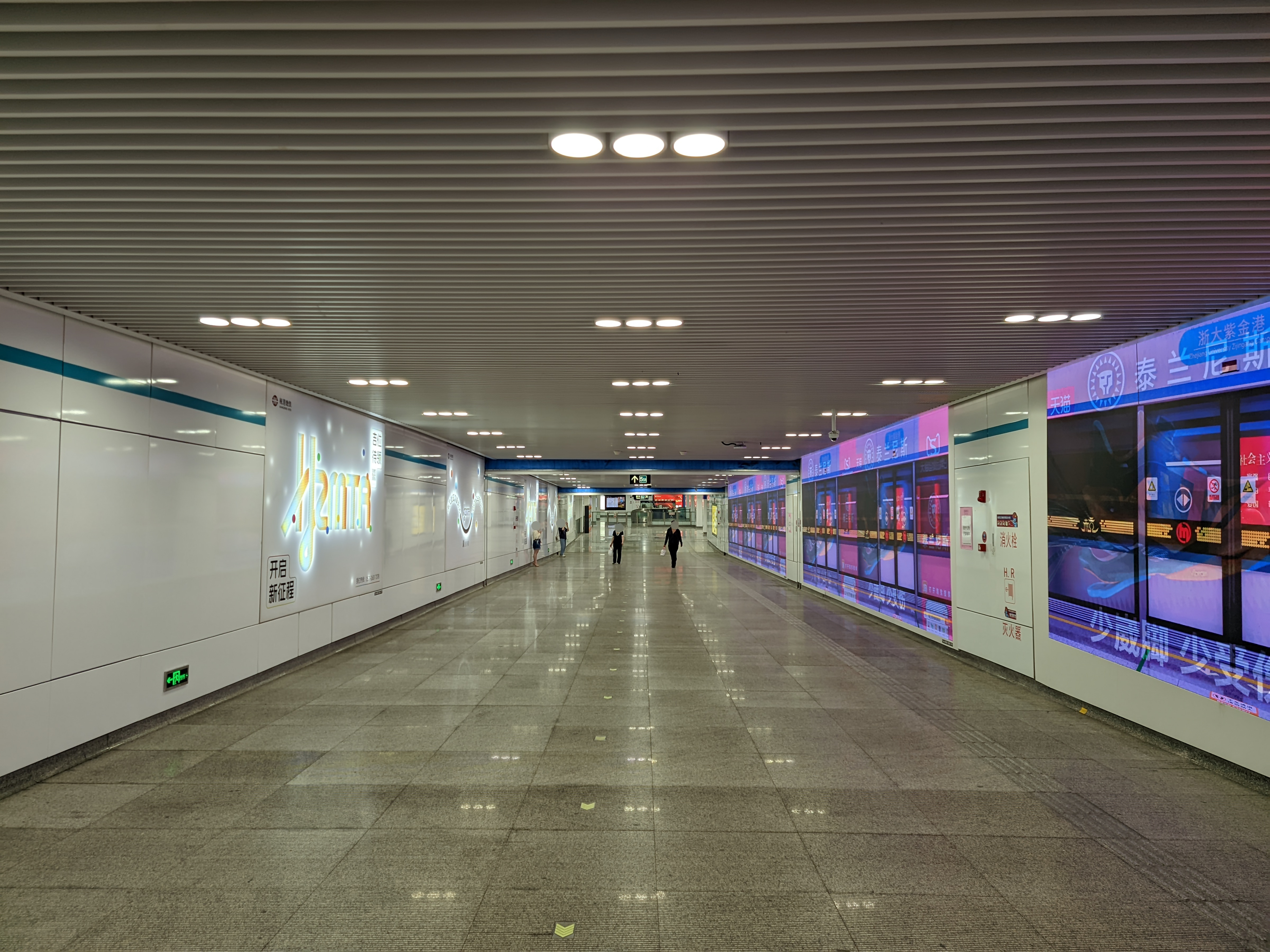
Passageway in paid area

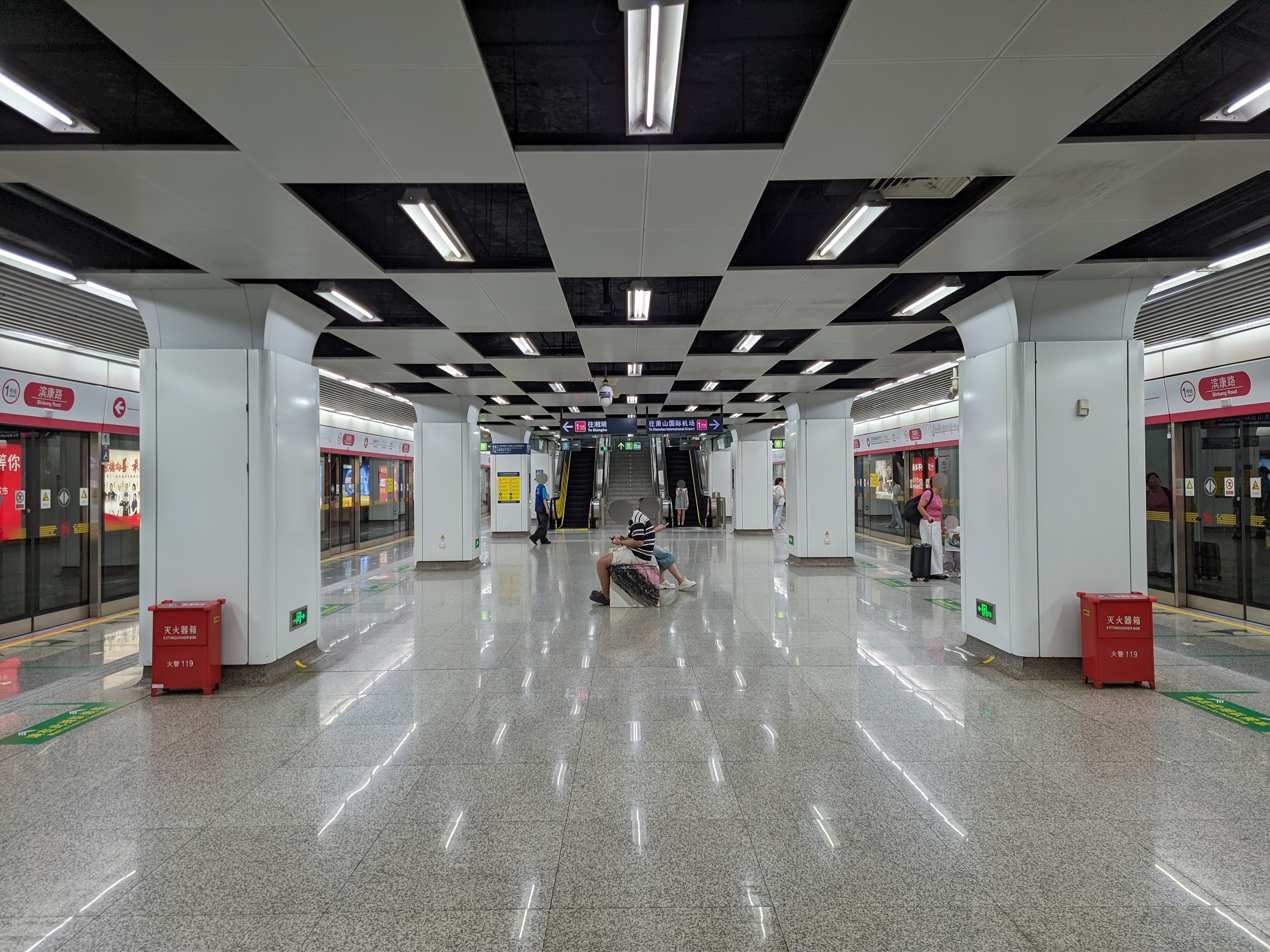
Line 1 platforms

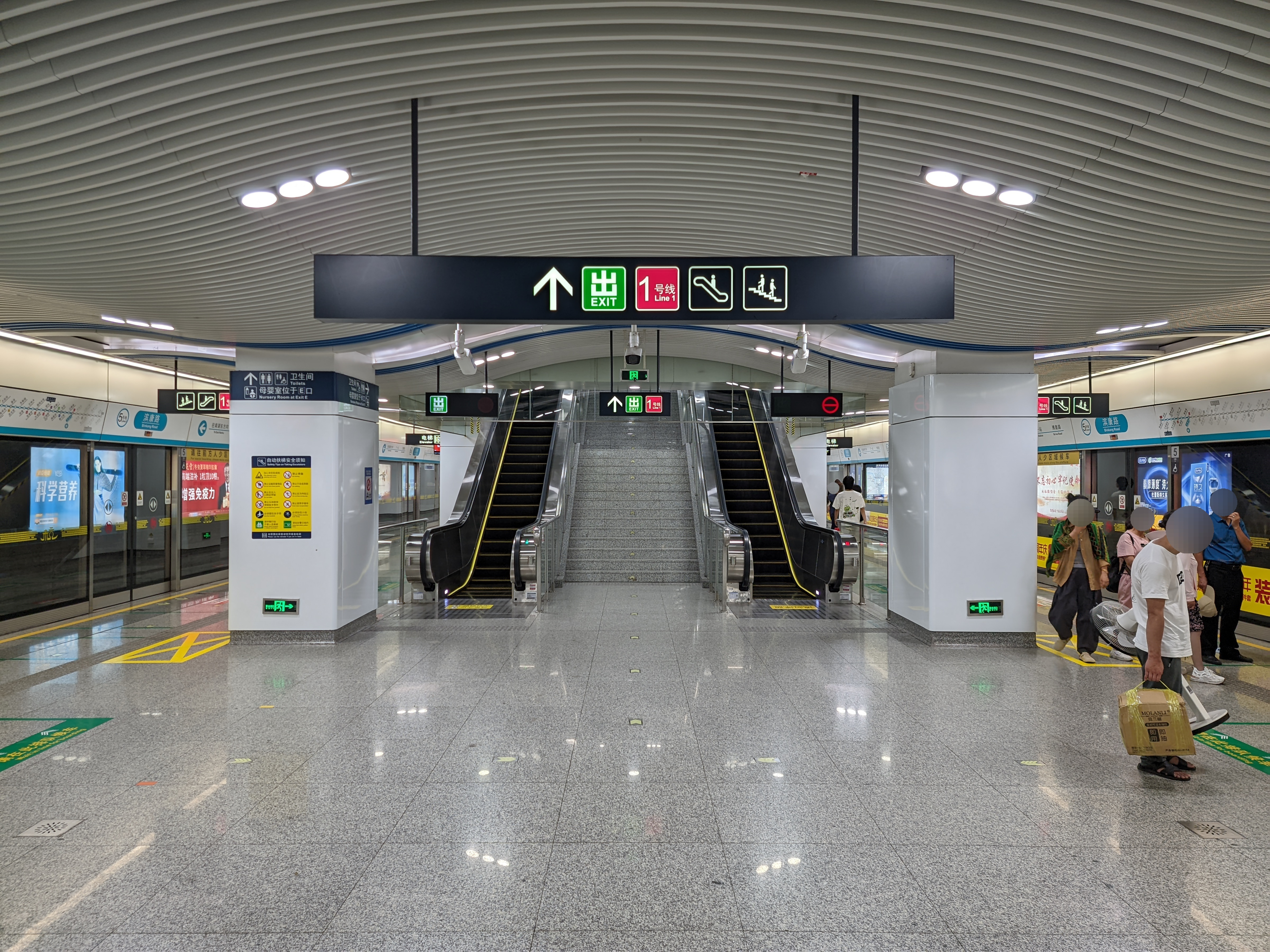
Line 5 platforms
