= Binhe Road station =

Hangzhou Metro station

Binhe Road 滨和路
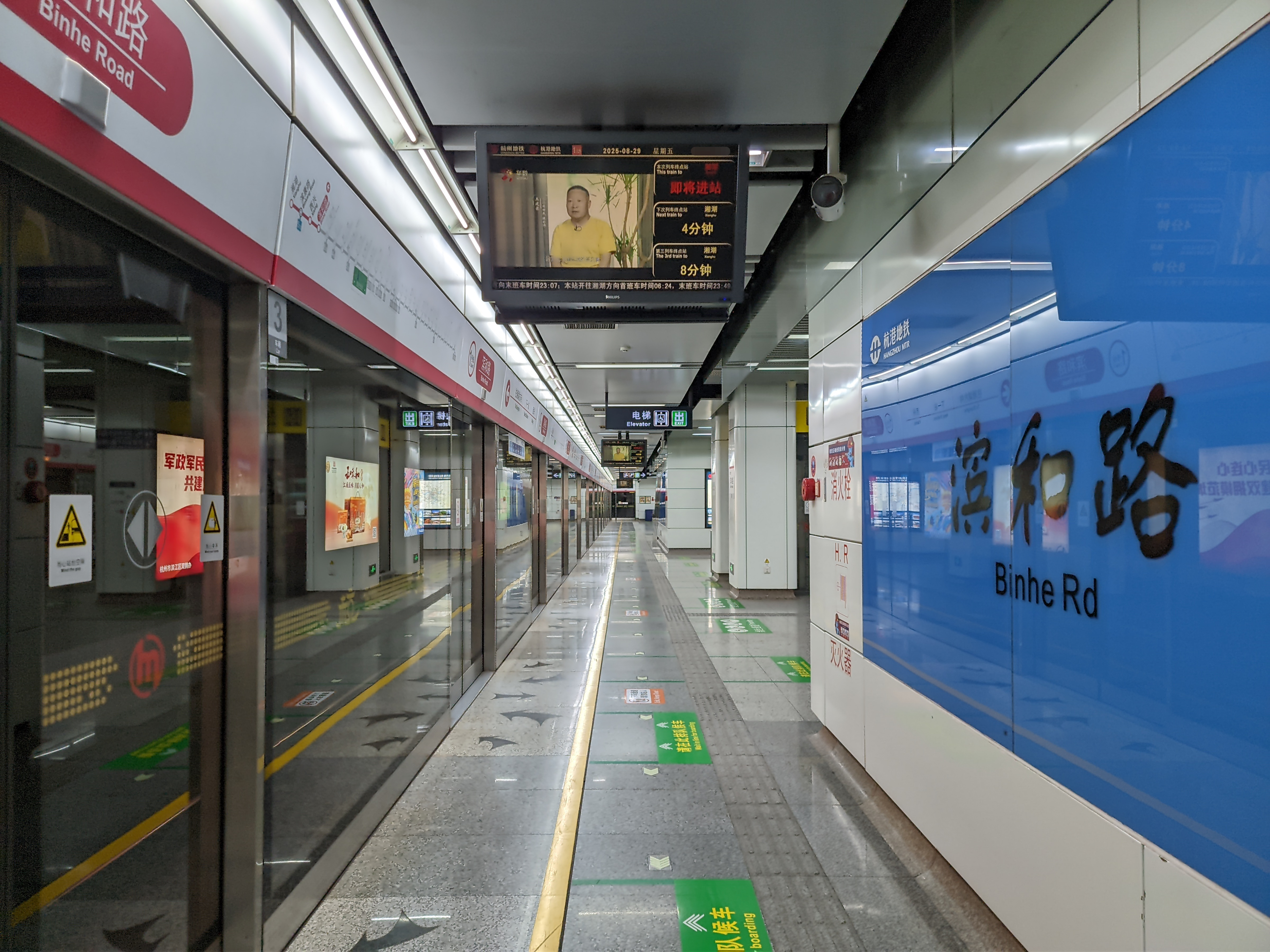
- Platform

General information
- Location: Jiangling Road × Binhe Road; Binjiang District, Hangzhou, Zhejiang; China
- Coordinates: 30°12′07″N 120°12′47″E
- System: Hangzhou Metro
- Operated by: Hangzhou MTR Corporation
- Line: Line 1
- Platforms: 2 (1 island platform)

History
- Opened: November 24, 2012; 13 years ago

Services
Preceding station	Hangzhou Metro	Following station
Xixing towards Xianghu	Line 1	Jiangling Road towards Xiaoshan International Airport
Location

Binhe Road (simplified Chinese: 滨和路; traditional Chinese: 濱和路) is a station on Line 1 of the Hangzhou Metro. It was opened in November 2012, together with the rest of the stations on Line 1. It is located in the Binjiang District of Hangzhou.

== Station layout ==
Binhe Road has two levels: a concourse, and an island platform with two tracks for line 1.

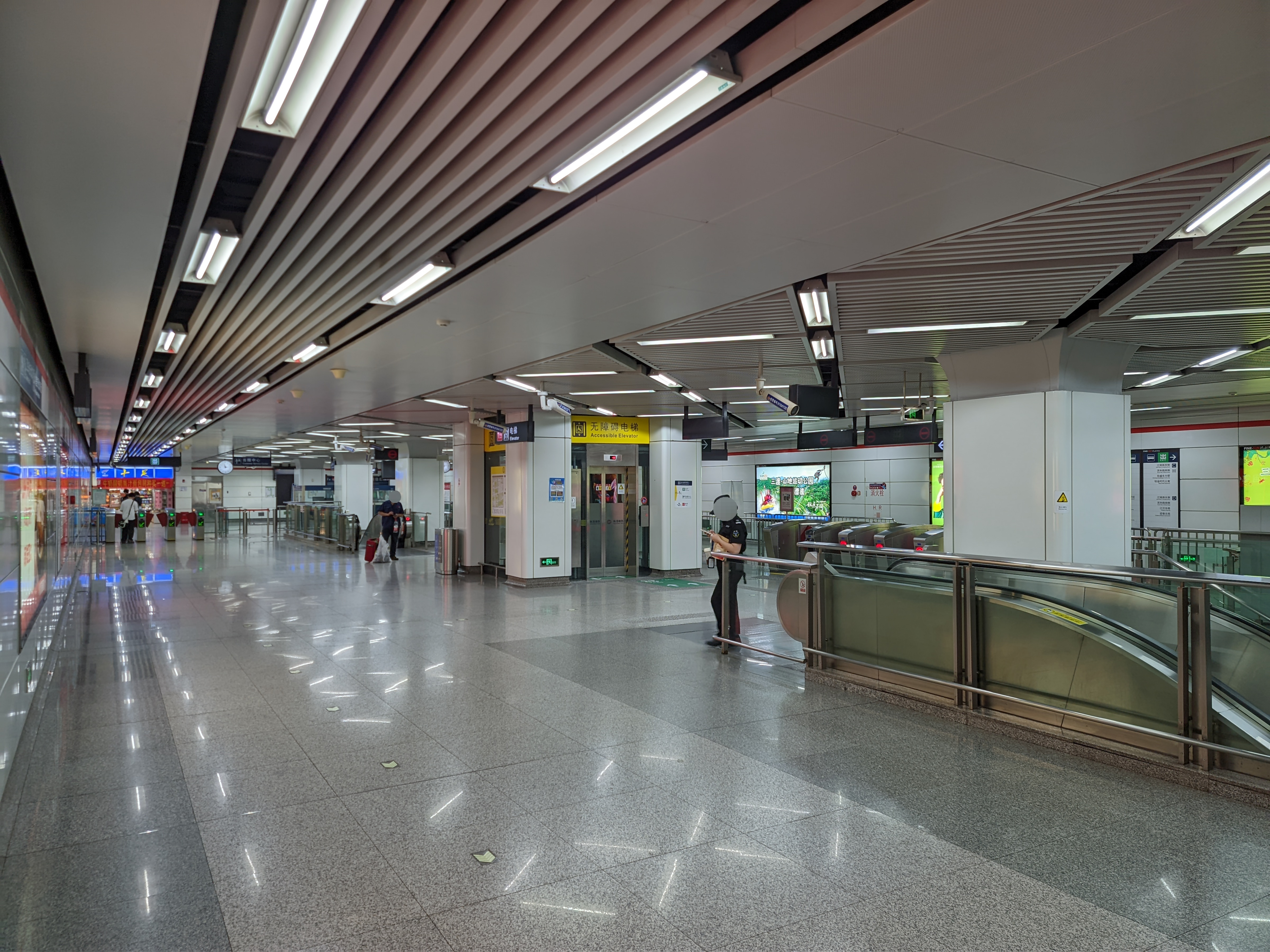
Concourse

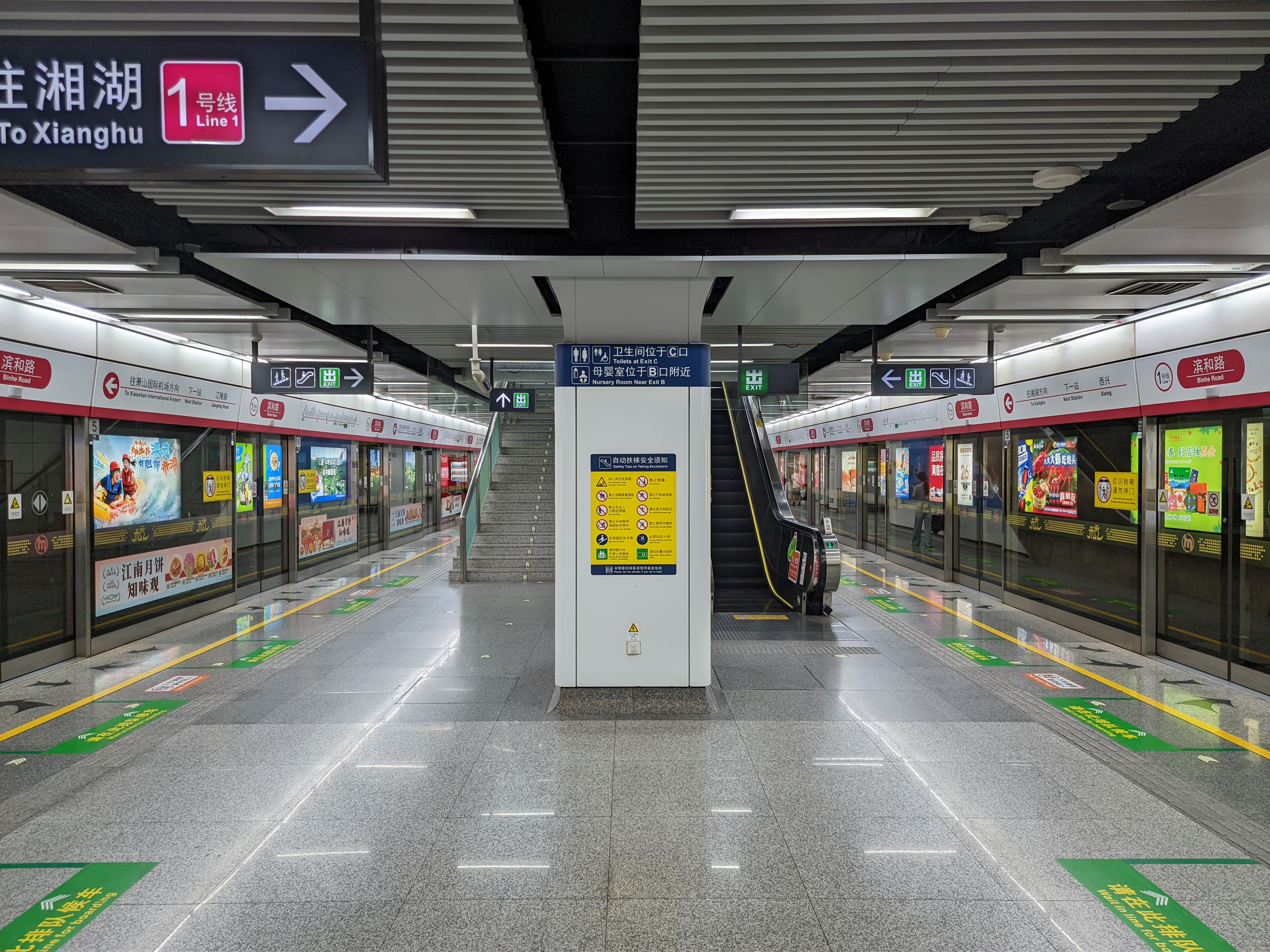
Platforms

== Entrances/exits ==
- B: Ruili Zhongyang Huacheng community
- C: Xinsheng Dongfangjun community
- D: Jianghan Road (E)
