= Xixing station =

Hangzhou Metro station

Xixing 西兴
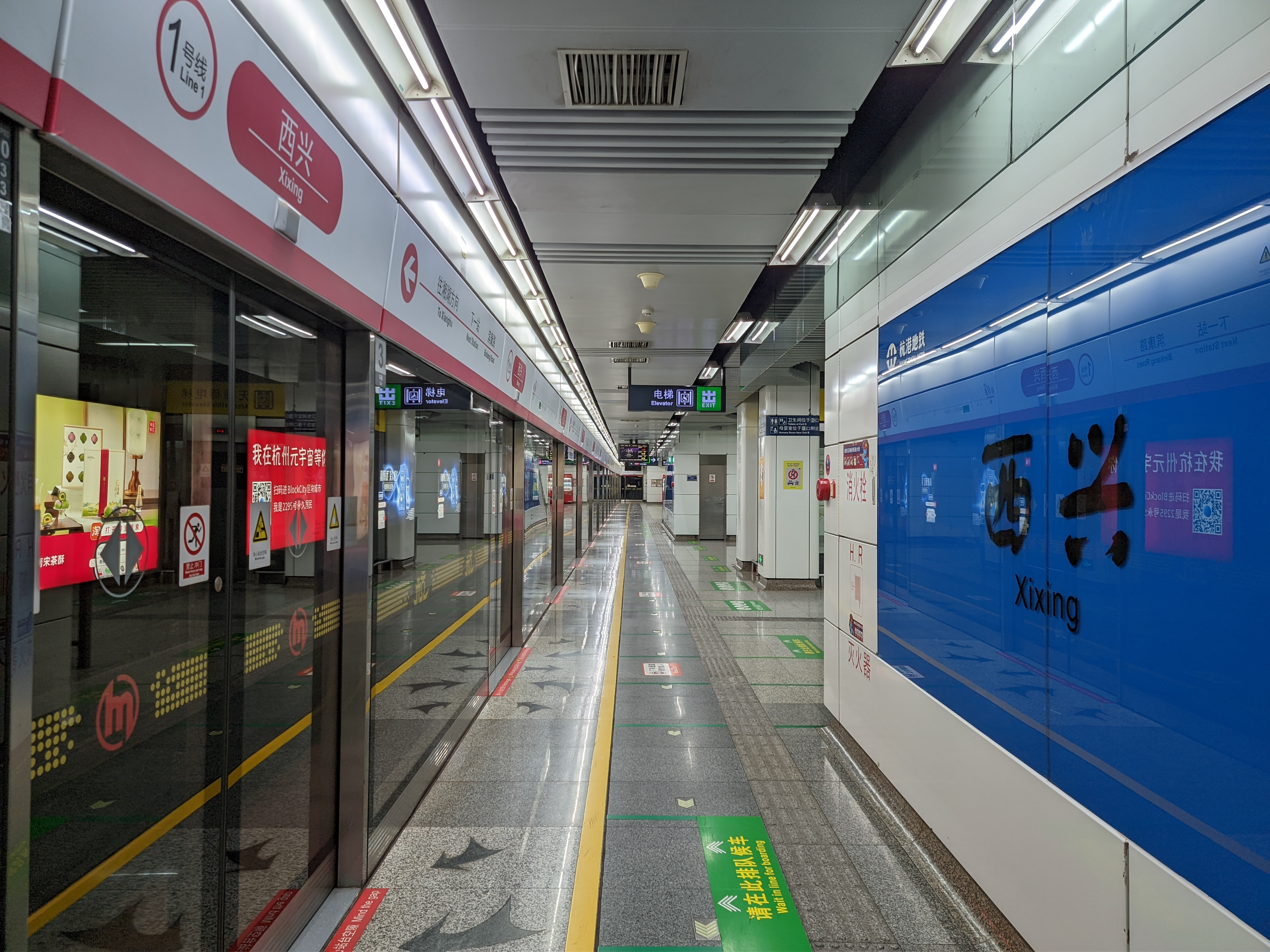
- Platform

General information
- Location: Bin'an Road; Binjiang District, Hangzhou, Zhejiang; China
- Coordinates: 30°11′23″N 120°12′58″E
- System: Hangzhou Metro
- Operated by: Hangzhou MTR Corporation
- Line: Line 1
- Platforms: 2 (1 island platform)
- Tracks: 2

Construction
- Accessible: Yes

History
- Opened: November 24, 2012; 13 years ago

Services
Preceding station	Hangzhou Metro	Following station
Binkang Road towards Xianghu	Line 1	Binhe Road towards Xiaoshan International Airport
Location

Xixing (simplified Chinese: 西兴; traditional Chinese: 西興) is a station on Line 1 of the Hangzhou Metro in China. It was opened in November 2012, together with the rest of the stations on Line 1. It is located in the Binjiang District of Hangzhou.

== Station layout ==
Xixing has two levels: a concourse, and an island platform with two tracks for line 1.

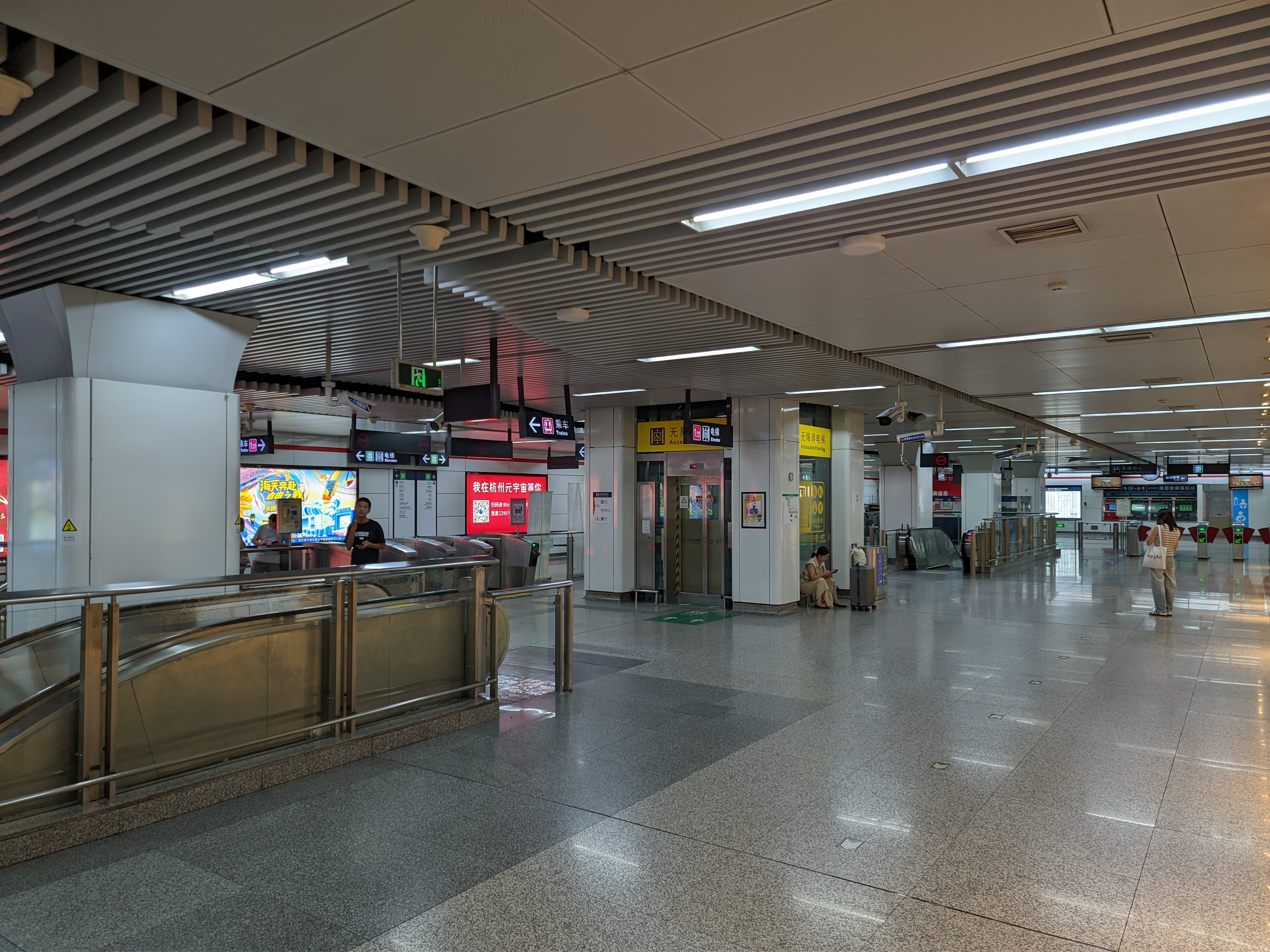
Concourse

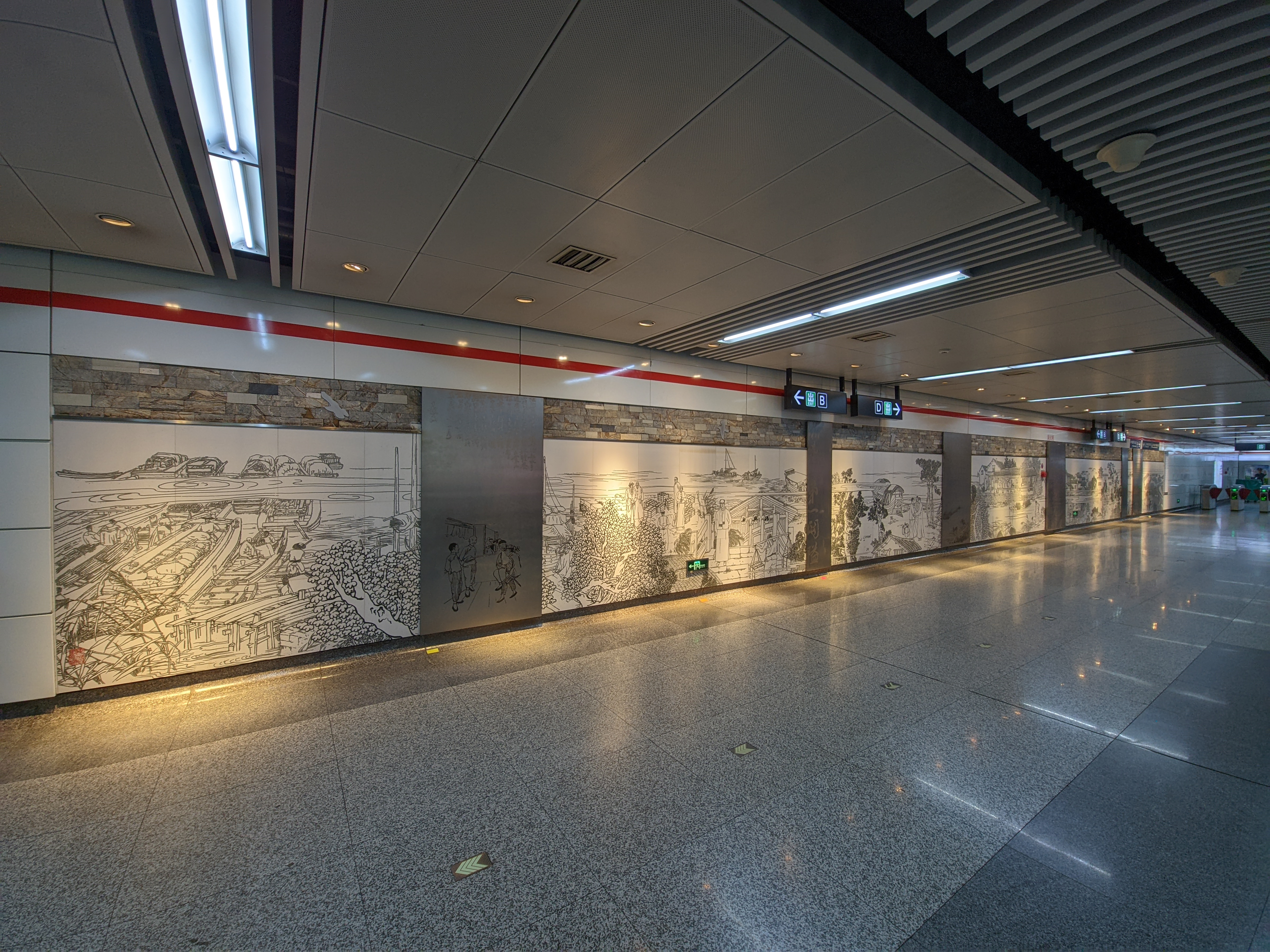
Art wall

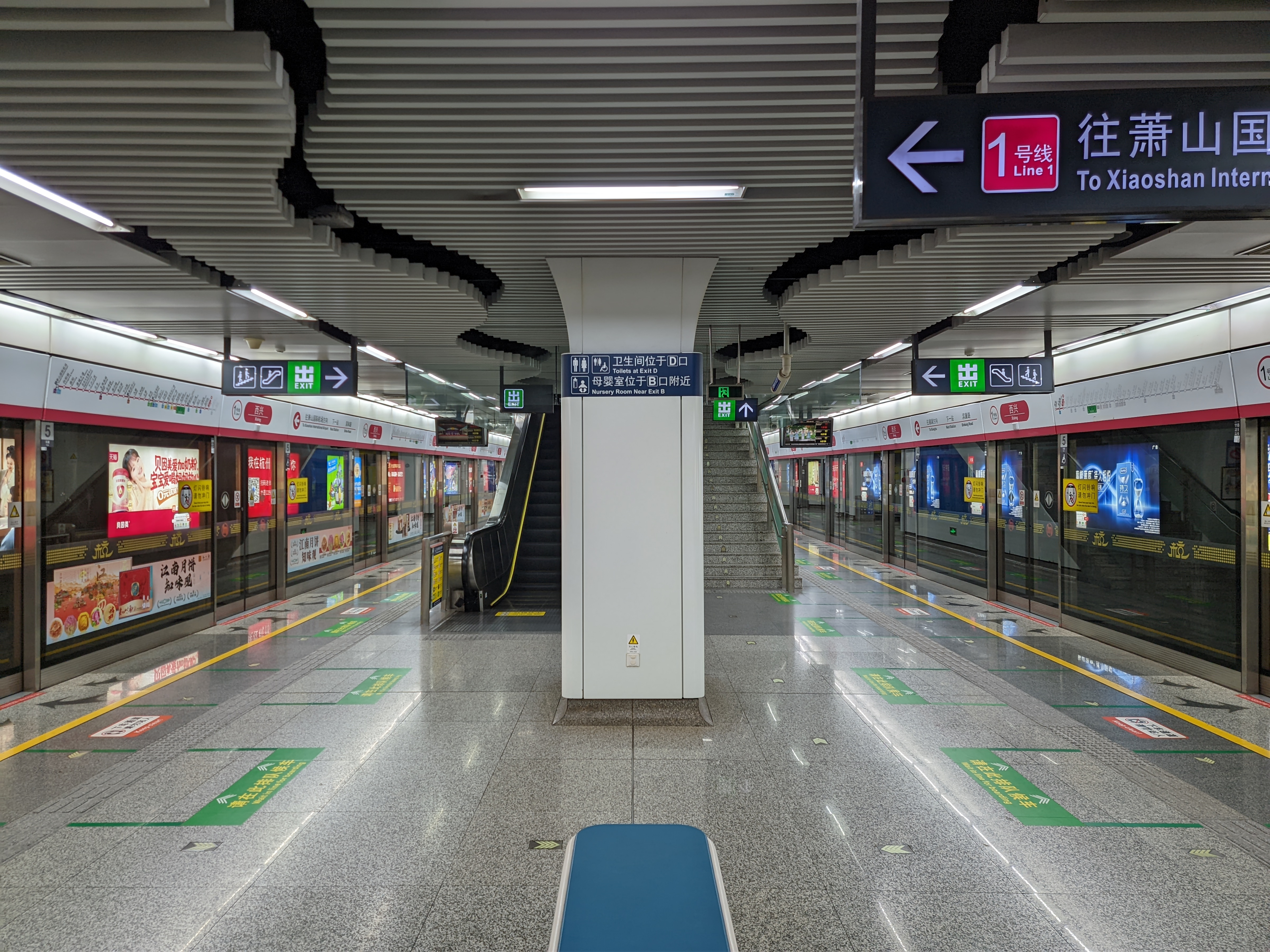
Platforms

== Entrances/exits ==
- B: Yanyulinsen Apartment
- D: Bin'an Road
