= Jiangling Road station =

Hangzhou Metro station

Jiangling Road 江陵路
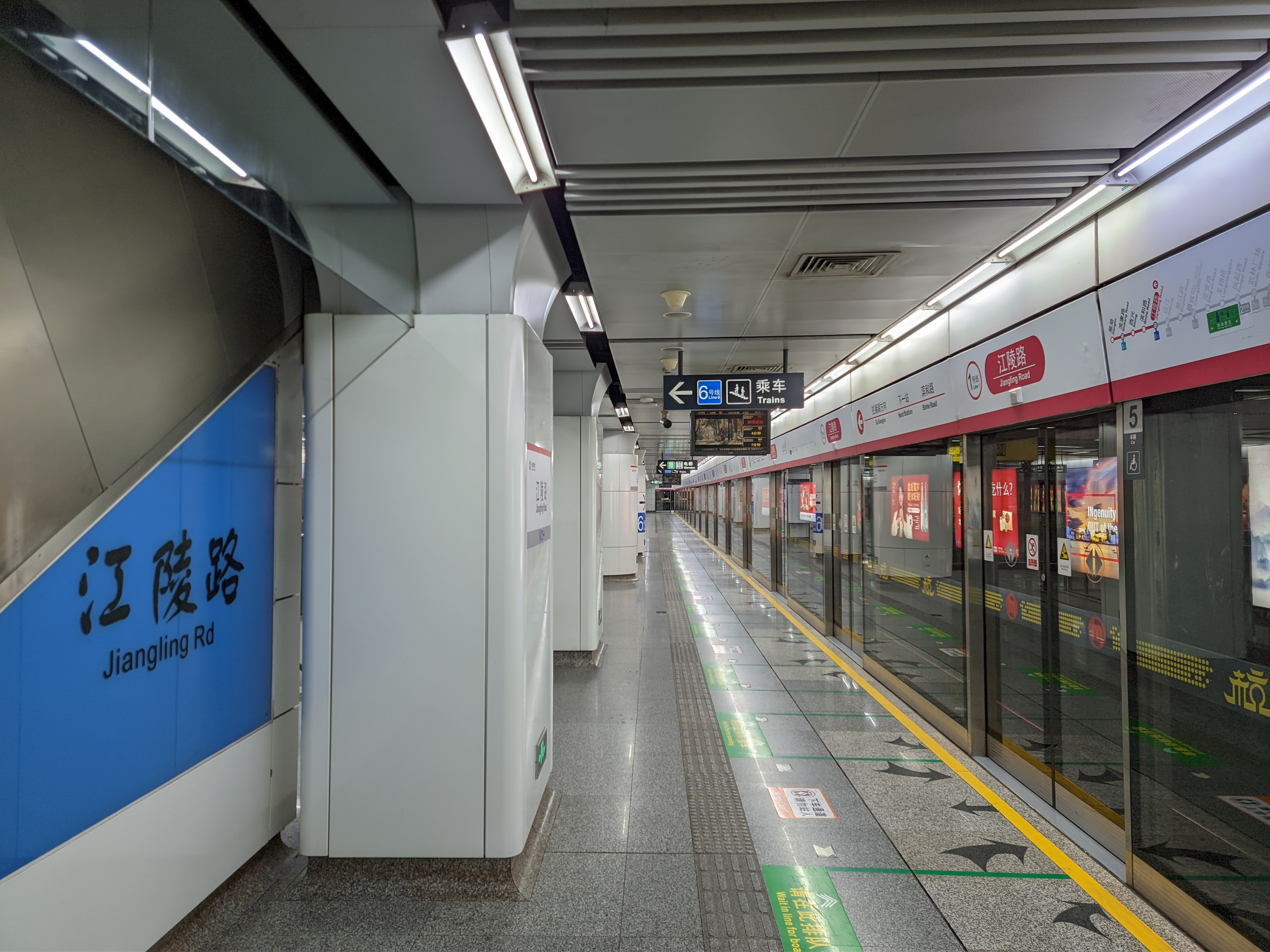
- Platform of Line 1

General information
- Location: Jiangling Road × Jiangnan Avenue; Binjiang District, Hangzhou, Zhejiang; China
- Coordinates: 30°12′42″N 120°12′44″E
- System: Hangzhou Metro
- Operated by: Hangzhou MTR Corporation; Hangzhou Metro Corporation
- Lines: Line 1 Line 6
- Platforms: 4 (2 island platforms)

Construction
- Structure type: Underground
- Accessible: Yes

Other information
- Station code: JLL

History
- Opened: 24 November 2012; 13 years ago (Line 1); 30 December 2020; 5 years ago (Line 6)

Services
Preceding station	Hangzhou Metro	Following station
Binhe Road towards Xianghu	Line 1	Jinjiang towards Xiaoshan International Airport
Jianghan Road towards West Guihua Road or Shuangpu	Line 6	Xingmin towards Goujulong
Location

Jiangling Road (Chinese: 江陵路) is a station on Line 1 and Line 6 of the Hangzhou Metro in China. It was opened in November 2012, together with the rest of the stations on Line 1. The Line 6 part of the station was opened in December 2020. It is located in the Binjiang District of Hangzhou, the capital city of Zhejiang province.

== Station layout ==
Jiangling Road station has three levels: a concourse, and separate levels for lines 1 and 6. Basement 2 is for line 1, and basement 3 is for line 6. Each of these consists of an island platform with two tracks.

== Entrances/exits ==
- A: Jiangling Rd.
- B: Jiangnan Ave.
- C: Jiangling Rd.
- D: Jiangnan Ave.

== Gallery ==
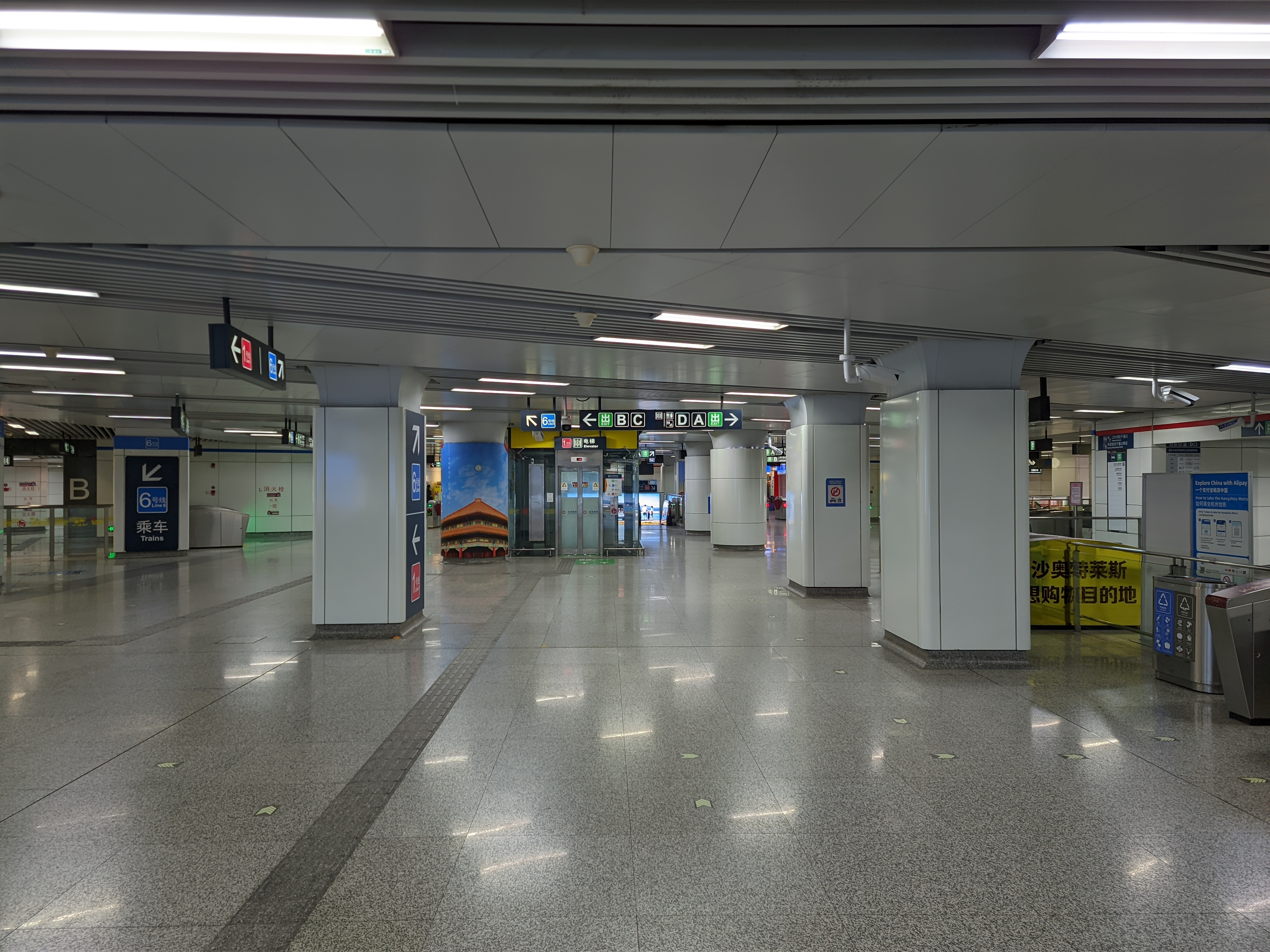
Concourse

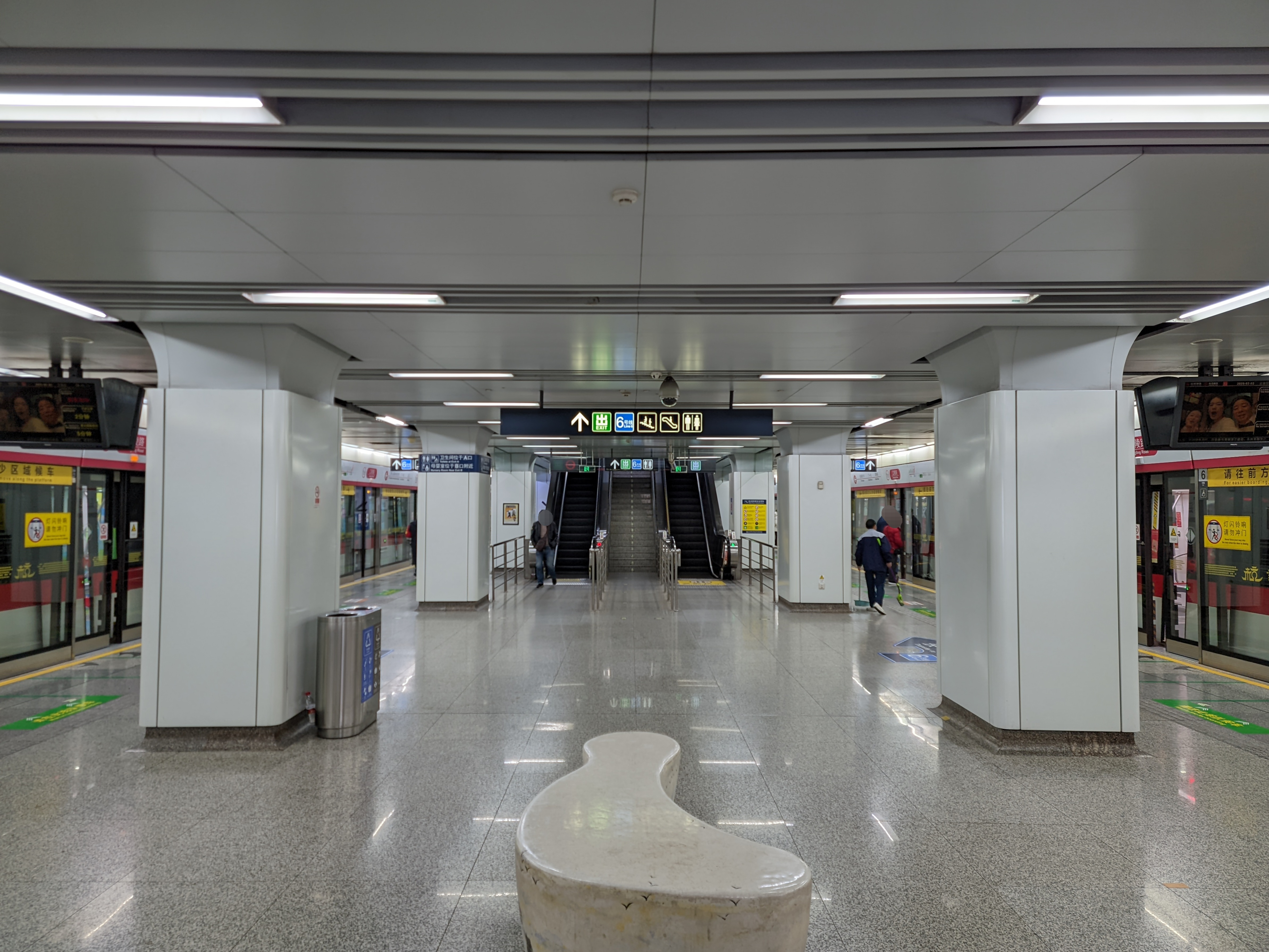
Line 1 platforms

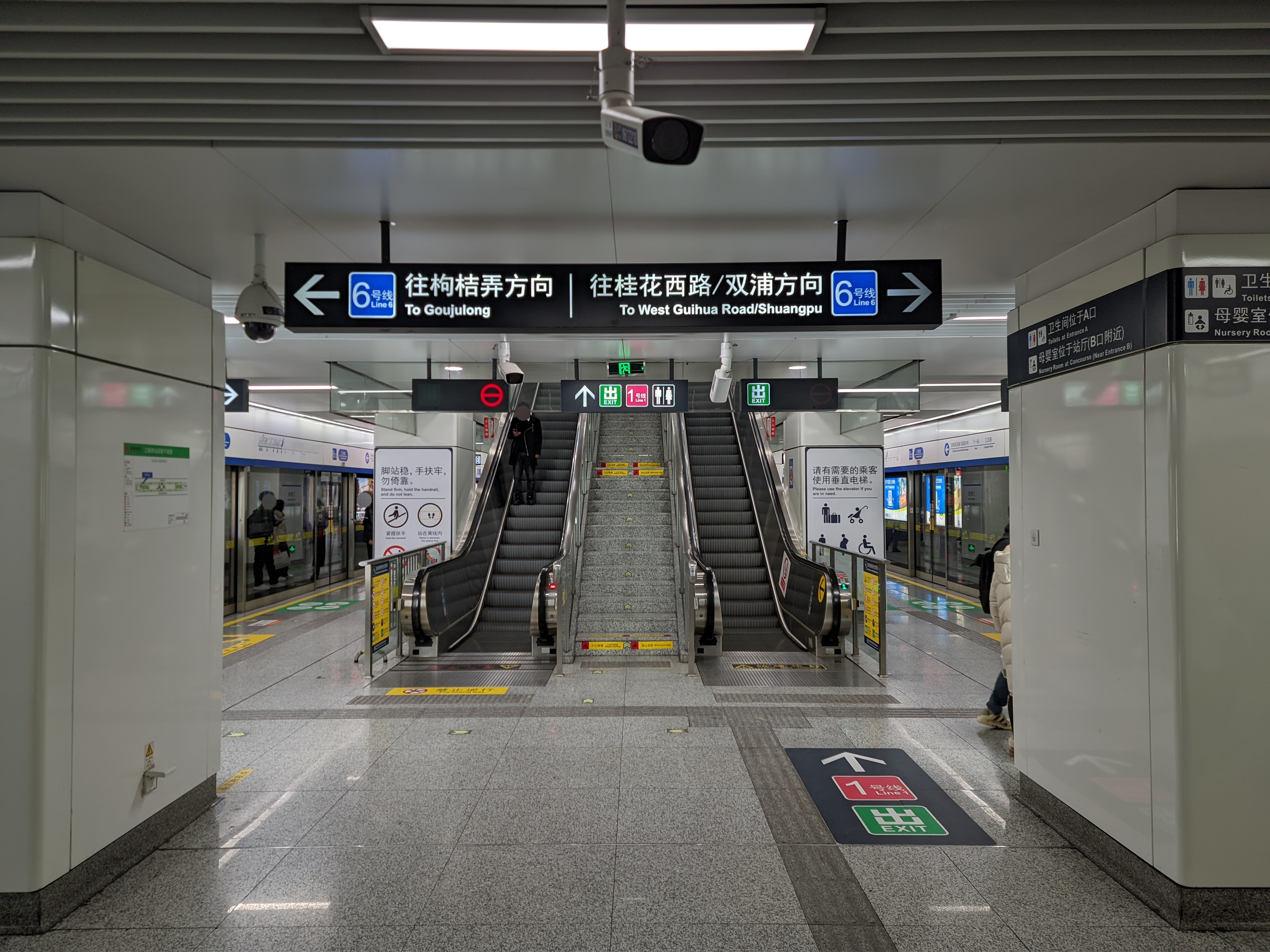
Line 6 platforms
