= Bo'ao Road station =

Metro station in China

Coordinates: 30.184835°N 120.239747°E

Bo'ao Road 博奥路
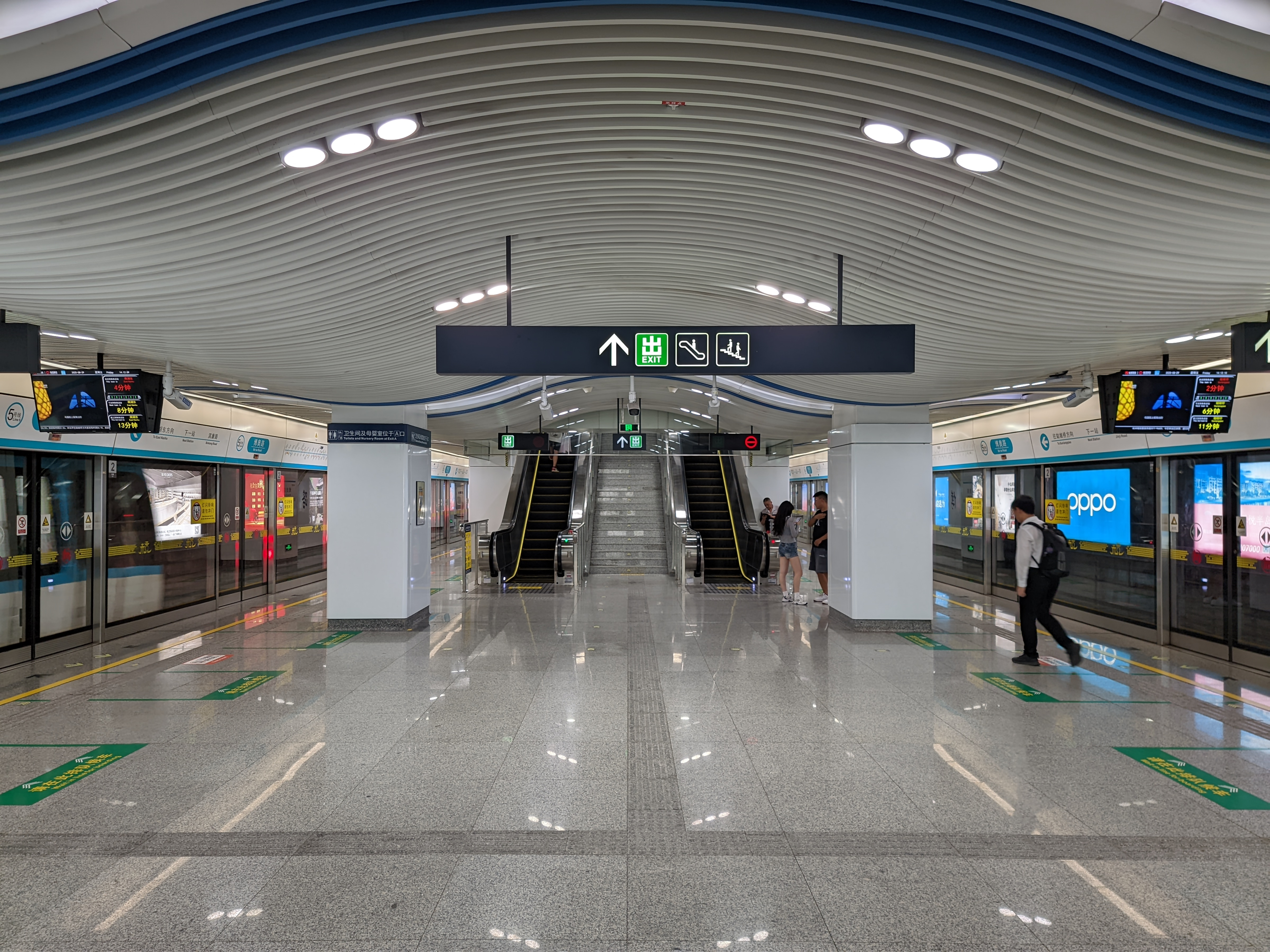

General information
- Location: Xiaoshan District, Hangzhou, Zhejiang; China
- Operator: Hangzhou Metro Corporation
- Line: Line 5
- Platforms: 2 (1 island platform)

History
- Opened: April 23, 2020

Services
Preceding station	Hangzhou Metro	Following station
Binkang Road towards East Nanhu	Line 5	Jinji Road towards Guniangqiao
Location

Bo'ao Road (Chinese: 博奥路) is a metro station on Line 5 of the Hangzhou Metro in China. It is located in the Xiaoshan District of Hangzhou.
