= Jinji Road station (Hangzhou Metro) =

Metro station in China

Jinji Road 金鸡路
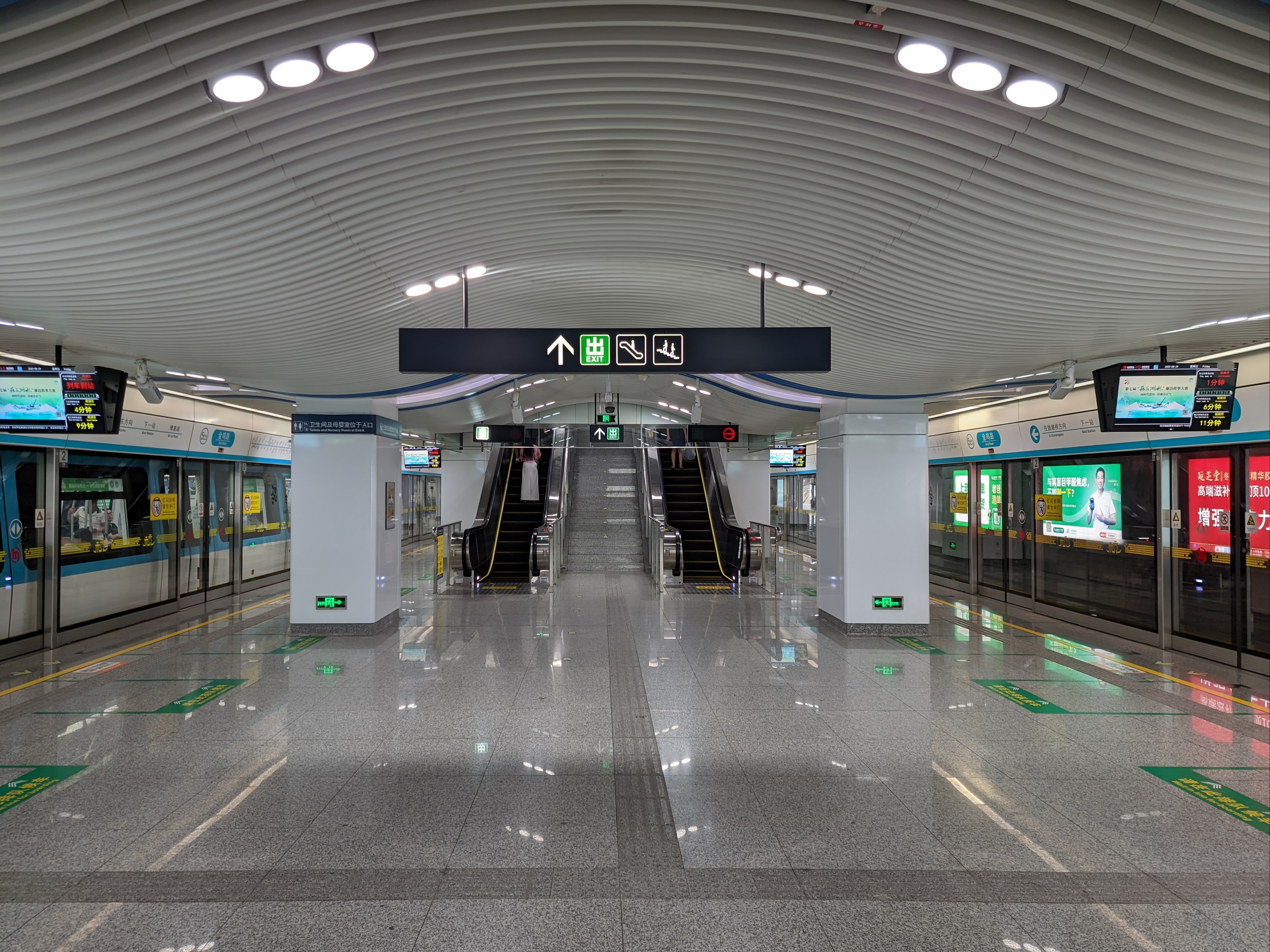
- Platforms

General information
- Location: Jincheng Road × Jinji Road; Xiaoshan District, Hangzhou, Zhejiang; China
- Coordinates: 30°11′03″N 120°14′57″E
- System: Hangzhou metro station
- Operator: Hangzhou MTR Line 5 Corporation
- Lines: Line 5 Line 15 (U/C)
- Platforms: 2 (1 island platform)

Construction
- Structure type: Underground
- Accessible: Yes

History
- Opened: April 23, 2020

Services
Preceding station	Hangzhou Metro	Following station
Bo'ao Road towards East Nanhu	Line 5	People's Square towards Guniangqiao
Xiaomian Road towards Yatai Road	Line 15 Under Construction	West Jiansheyi Road towards Chongxian
Location

Jinji Road (simplified Chinese: 金鸡路; traditional Chinese: 金雞路) is a metro station on Line 5 of the Hangzhou Metro in China. It is located in the Xiaoshan District of Hangzhou.

== Station layout ==
Jinji Road has two levels: a concourse, and an island platform with two tracks for line 5.

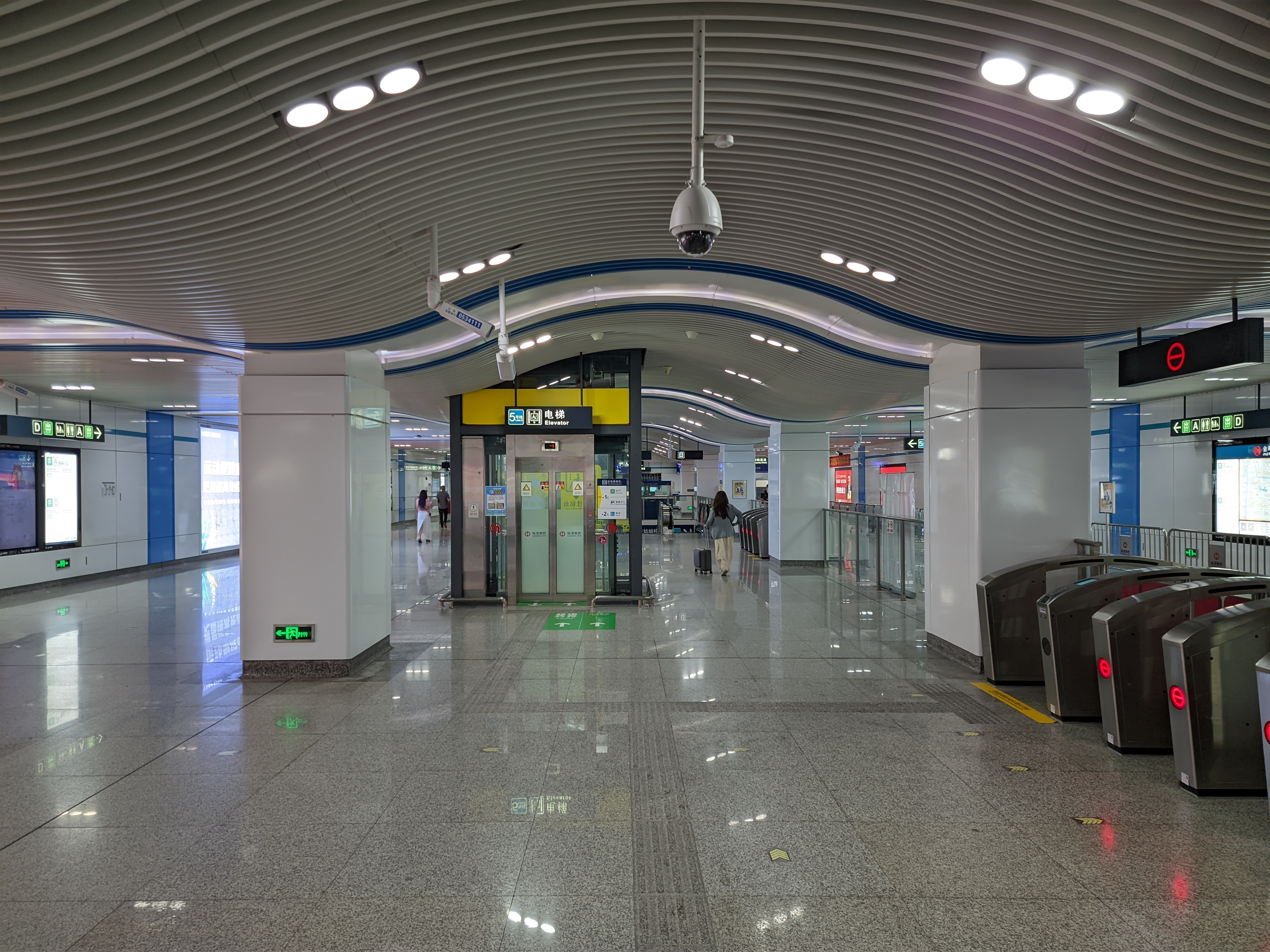
Concourse

== Entrances/exits ==
- A: Tianhuiyuan community
- B2: Carlifornia Sunshine New Century Plaza
- C: Royal Seal Garden
- D: Zhijia Garden
