= Jianghan Road station (Hangzhou Metro) =

Station on the Hangzhou Metro in China

Jianghan Road 江汉路
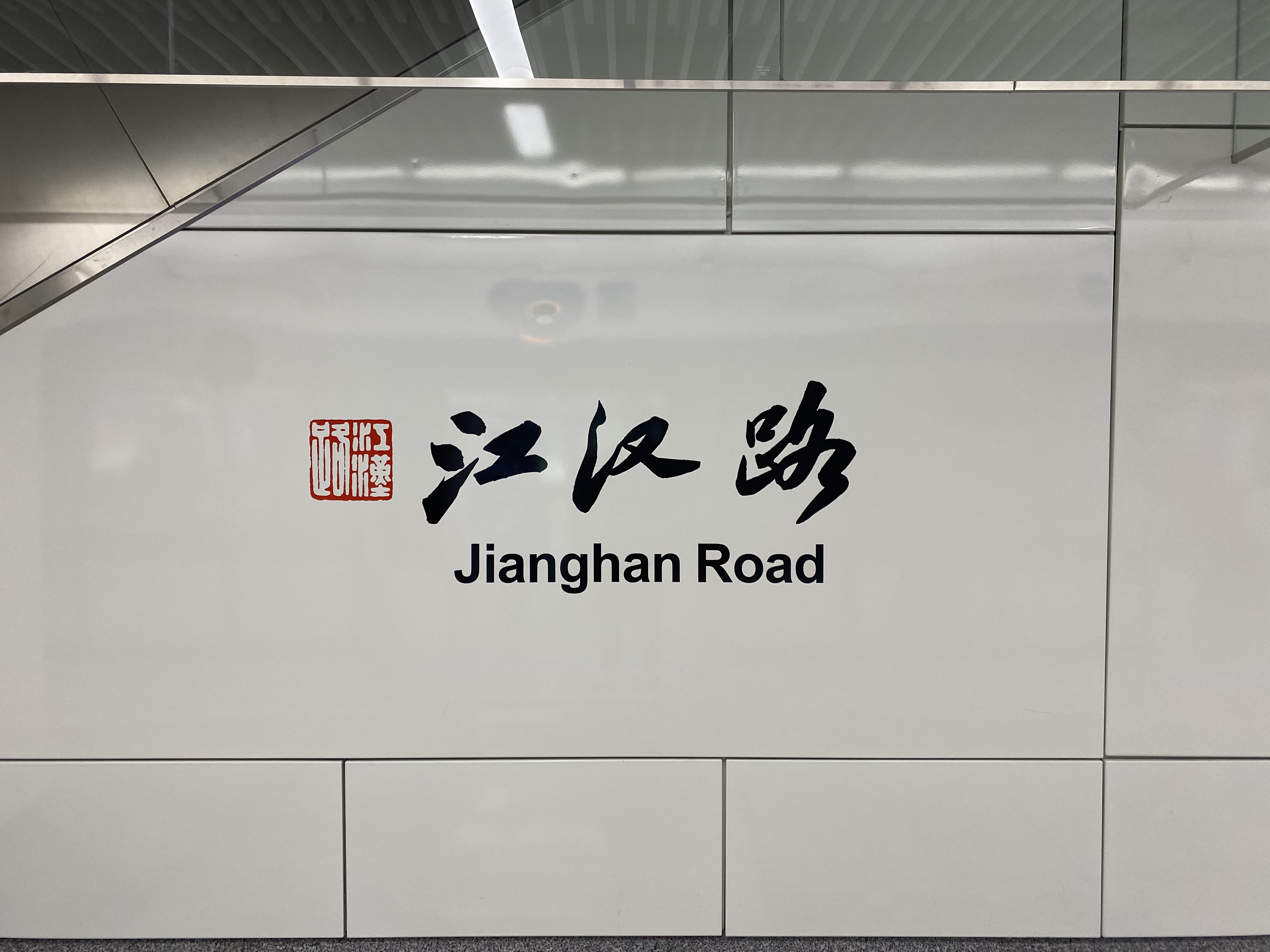
- Platform

General information
- Location: Binjiang District, Hangzhou, Zhejiang; China
- Operator: Hangzhou Metro Corporation
- Line: Line 6
- Platforms: 2 (1 island platform)

History
- Opened: 30 December 2020

Services
Preceding station	Hangzhou Metro	Following station
Changhe towards West Guihua Road or Shuangpu	Line 6	Jiangling Road towards Goujulong
Location

Jianghan Road (Chinese: 江汉路) is a metro station on Line 6 of the Hangzhou Metro in China. Opened on 30 December 2020, it is located near the Powerlong Binjiang Mall in the Binjiang District of Hangzhou, the capital city of Zhejiang province.
