= Nanyang station =

Hangzhou Metro station

Nanyang 南阳
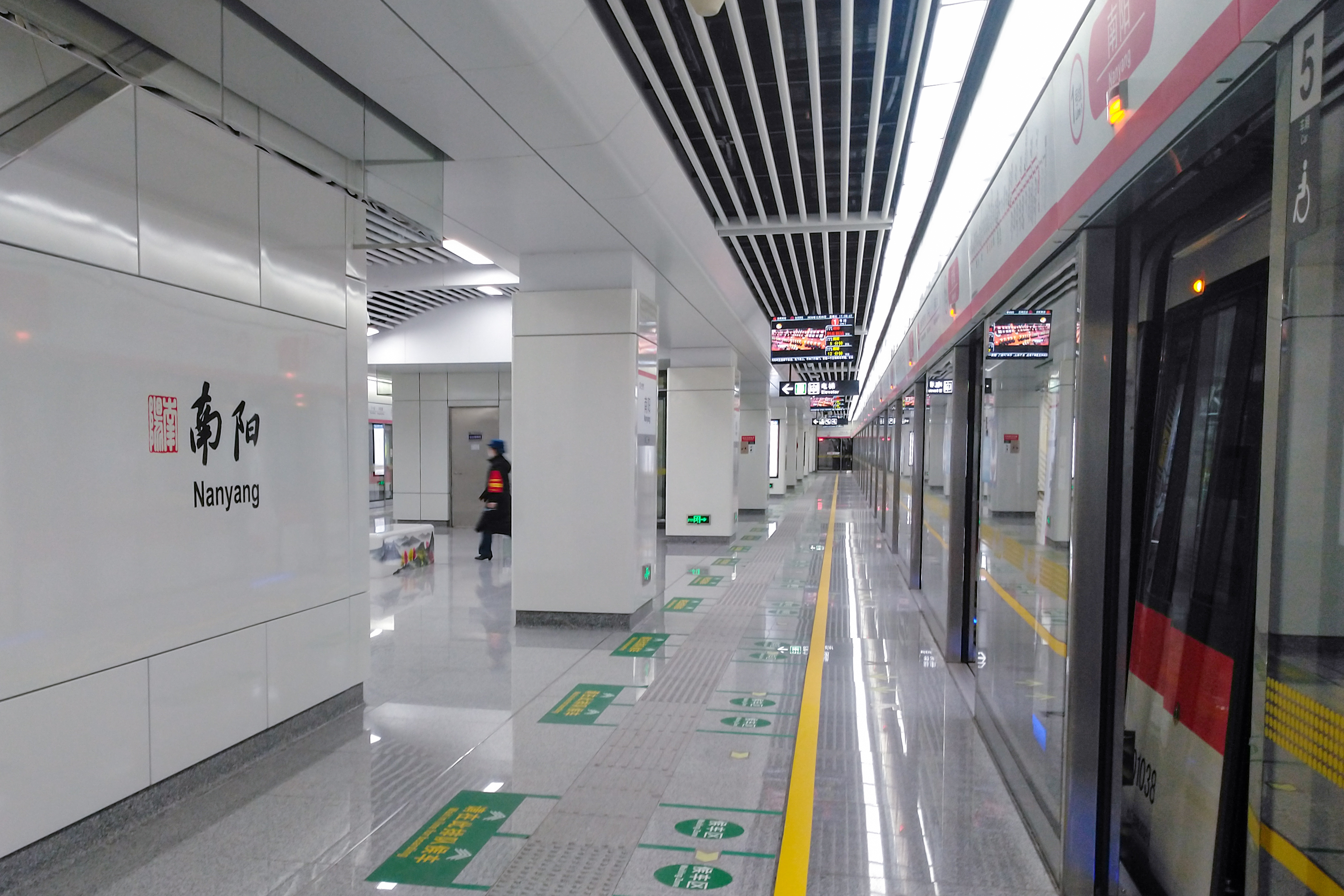
- Platform of Nanyang station

General information
- Location: Xiaoshan District, Hangzhou, Zhejiang; China
- Coordinates: 30.2724°N 120.4311°E
- Operator: Hangzhou Metro Corporation
- Line: Line 1
- Platforms: 2 (1 island platform)

History
- Opened: 30 December 2020

Services
| Preceding station | Hangzhou Metro | Following station |
|---|---|---|
| Gangcheng Avenue towards Xianghu | Line 1 | Xiangyang Road towards Xiaoshan International Airport |
Location

Nanyang (Chinese: 南阳) is a metro station on Line 1 of the Hangzhou Metro in China. It was opened on 30 December 2020, together with the Phase 3 of Line 1. It is located in the Xiaoshan District of Hangzhou.
