= Hangzhou Grand Convention and Exhibition Center station =

Hangzhou Metro station

Hangzhou Grand Convention and Exhibition Center 杭州大会展中心
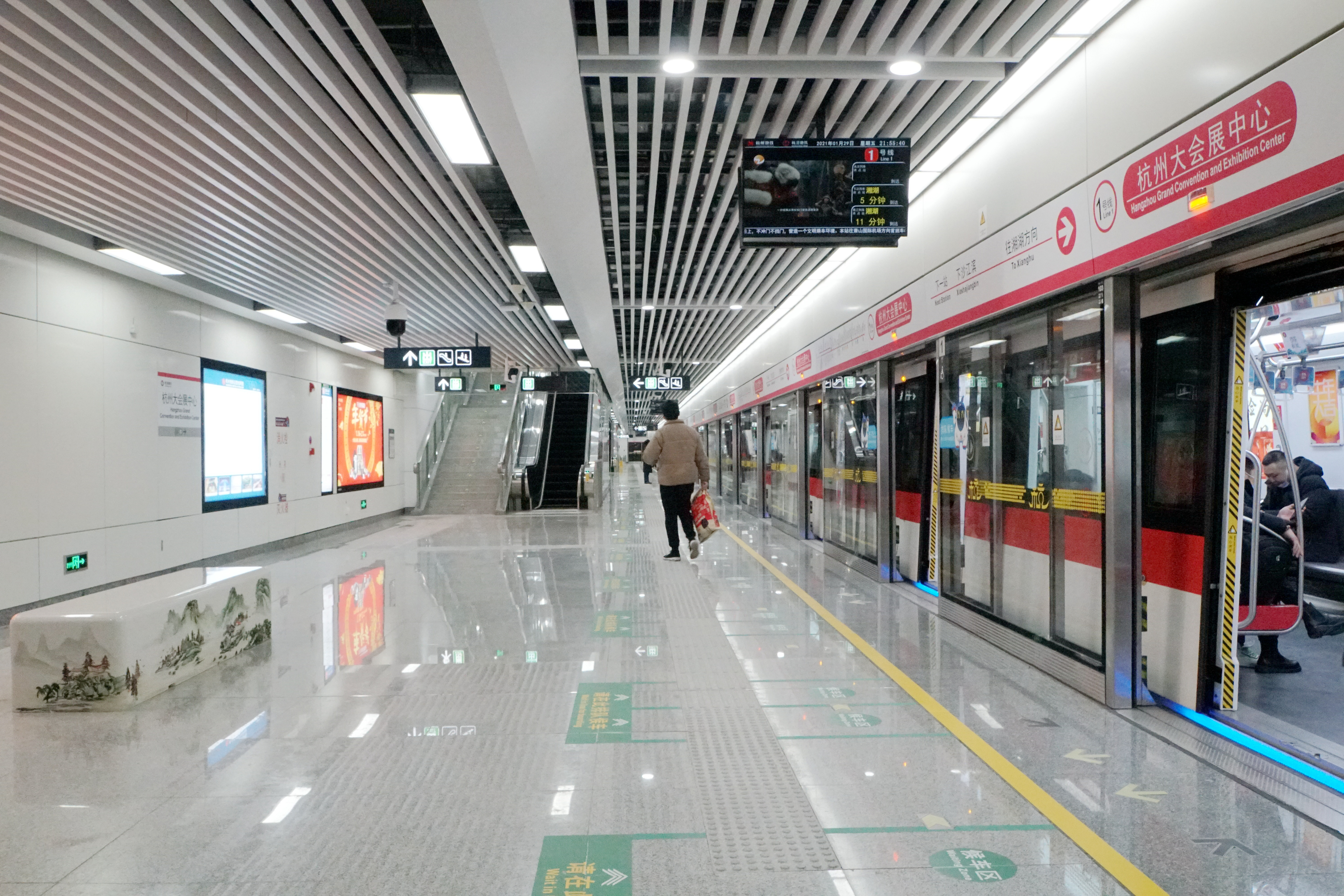

General information
- Location: Xiaoshan District, Hangzhou, Zhejiang; China
- Operator: Hangzhou Metro Corporation
- Line: Line 1

Other information
- Station code: HZD

History
- Opened: 30 December 2020
- Former names: Binjiangyi Road (滨江一路)

Services
Preceding station	Hangzhou Metro	Following station
Xiasha Jiangbin towards Xianghu	Line 1	Gangcheng Avenue towards Xiaoshan International Airport
Location

Hangzhou Grand Convention and Exhibition Center (Chinese: 杭州大会展中心) is a metro station on Line 1 of the Hangzhou Metro in China. It was opened on 30 December 2020, together with the Phase 3 of Line 1. It is located in the Xiaoshan District of Hangzhou.
