= Gangcheng Avenue station =

Metro station in Hangzhou, China

Gangcheng Avenue 港城大道
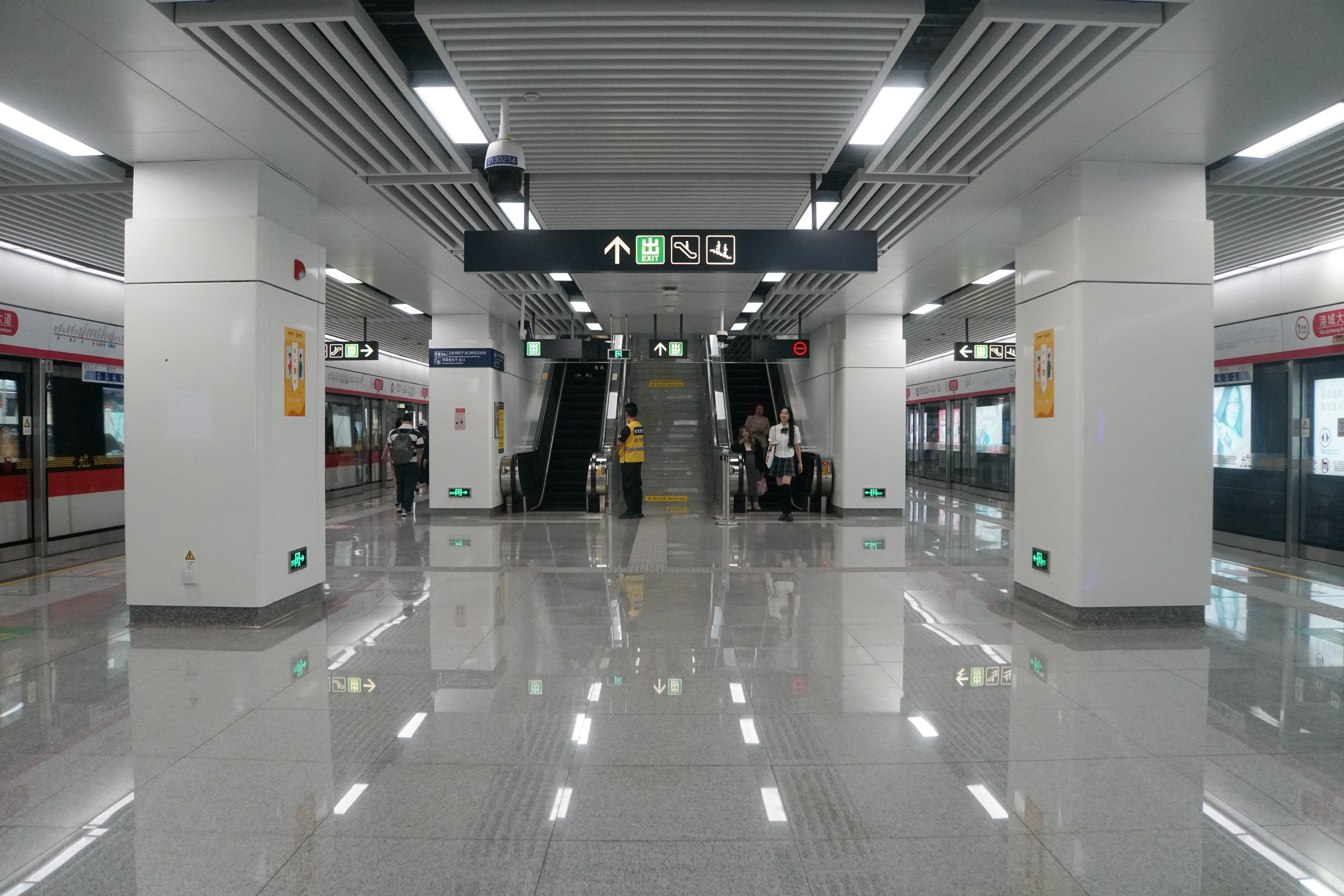
- Platform

General information
- Location: Xiaoshan District, Hangzhou, Zhejiang; China
- Coordinates: 30.2729°N 120.4207°E
- Operator: Hangzhou Metro Corporation
- Line: Line 1
- Platforms: 2 (1 island platform)

History
- Opened: 30 December 2020

Services
Preceding station	Hangzhou Metro	Following station
Hangzhou Grand Convention and Exhibition Center towards Xianghu	Line 1	Nanyang towards Xiaoshan International Airport
Location

Gangcheng Avenue (Chinese: 港城大道) is a metro station on Line 1 of the Hangzhou Metro in China. It was opened on 30 December 2020, together with the Phase 3 of Line 1. It is located in the Xiaoshan District of Hangzhou.
