= Xiashajiangbin station =

Hangzhou Metro station

Coordinates: 30°17′24″N 120°22′38″E

Xiashajiangbin 下沙江滨
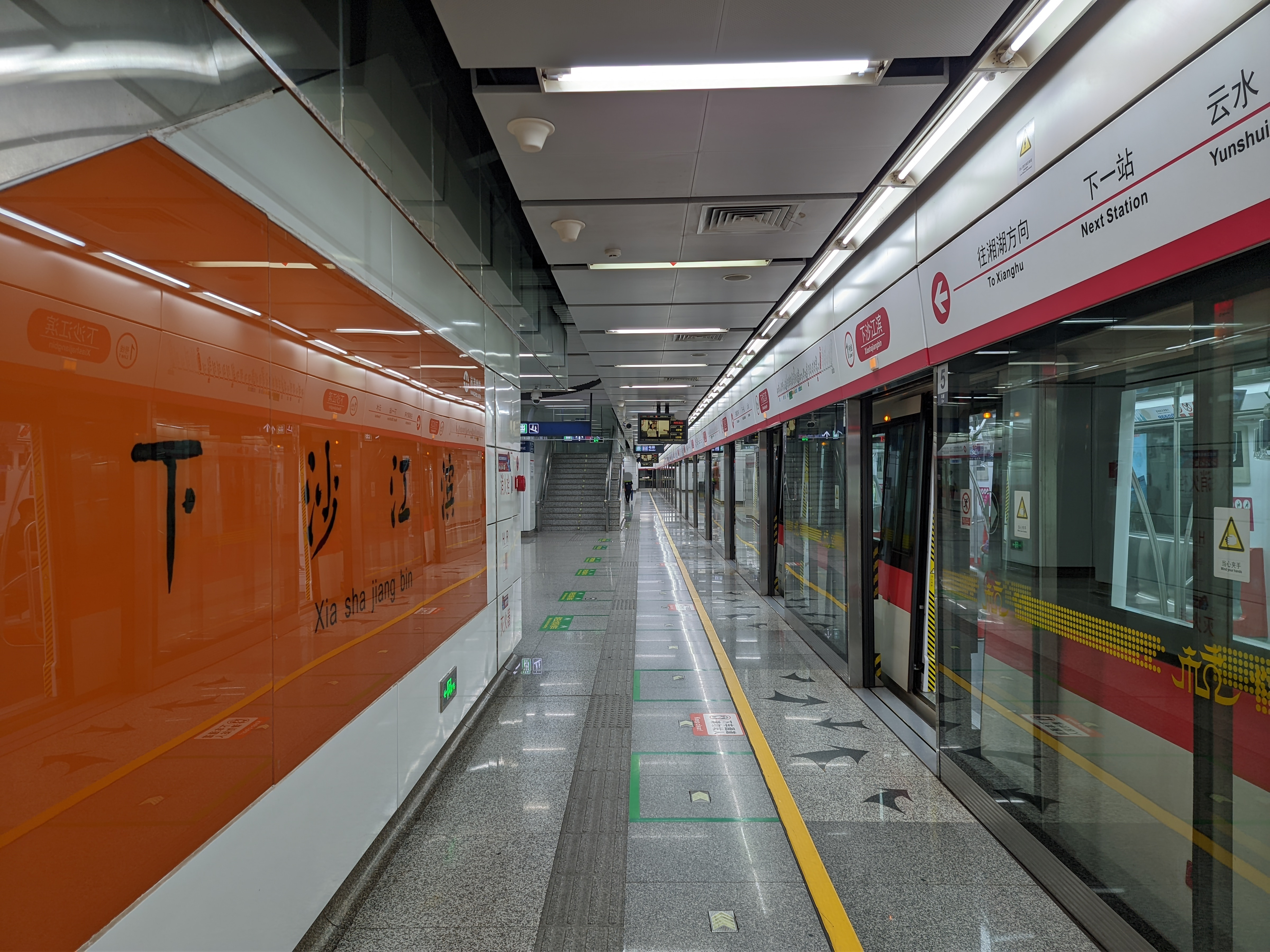

General information
- Location: Qiantang District, Hangzhou, Zhejiang; China
- Operated by: Hangzhou Metro Corporation
- Line: Line 1

History
- Opened: 24 November 2015

Services
Preceding station	Hangzhou Metro	Following station
Yunshui towards Xianghu	Line 1	Hangzhou Grand Convention and Exhibition Center towards Xiaoshan International Airport
Location

Xiashajiangbin (Chinese: 下沙江滨) is a station on Line 1 of the Hangzhou Metro in China. It was opened on 24 November 2015, together with the expanded section of Line 1. It is located in the Qiantang District of Hangzhou.

During peak periods, every other train terminates at this station, while every other train continues toward Xiaoshan International Airport station.
