= 2022 in rail transport =

This article lists events related to rail transport that occurred in 2022.

== Events ==
=== January ===
- (China) January 1– Wuyi Tram opens.
- (Qatar) January 1 – First phase of the Lusail Tram opens.
- (China) January 8 – Hangzhou–Taizhou high-speed railway opens.
- (China) January 11 – Trial opening of the Jinyi section of Jinhua Rail Transit's Jinyidong line.
- (France) January 13 – Line 4 of the Paris Metro is extended from Mairie de Montrouge to Bagneux–Lucie Aubrac.
- (China) January 15 – The Jiaxing Tram is extended from Fanggong Road Binhe Road to Jiaxing Railway Station.
- (China) January 25 – The first phase of Line 9 of the Chongqing Rail Transit opens between Gaotanyan and Xingke Avenue.

=== February ===
- (Morocco) February 16 – Opening of Line 2 extension of the Rabat–Salé tramway.
- (China) February 21 – The first phases of Lines 3 and 10 of the Hangzhou Metro open, and Line 4 is extended from Pengbu to Chihua Street.

=== March ===
- (India) March 6 – The Pune Metro starts operations between PCMC Bhavan and Phugewadi on the Purple Line, and between Vanaz and Garware College on the Aqua Line.
- March 19
  - (South Korea) – Line 4 of the Seoul Metropolitan Subway is extended from Danggogae to Jinjeop.
  - – The 75 kilometer 'Beno' rail line between Belgrade and Novi Sad in Serbia is reopened as a high speed line as part of the Budapest–Belgrade railway.
- (United States) March 21 – The Union Square Branch of the MBTA subway's Green Line Extension opens in Somerville.
- (Philippines) March 22 – Line 3 of the Manila Metro Rail Transit System completes an upgrading and rehabilitation project.
- March 25
  - (Russia) – Construction of the Moscow–Saint Petersburg high-speed railway is suspended.
  - (Spain) – The Bilbao tram is extended from Atxuri to Bolueta using the former Euskotren Trena alignment between Kukullaga and Atxuri.
- (Finland) (Russia) March 28 – Allegro international high-speed service ends operations.
- (India) March 29 – Punjabi Bagh West station on the Delhi Metro becomes an interchange between the Pink Line and the Green Line.
- (China) March 30 – Guiyang railway loop line opens.
- March 31
  - (China) – The first phase of Line 22 of the Guangzhou Metro opens from Panyu Square to Chentougang.
  - (Russia) – The Krasnodar tramway is extended from Solnechnaya to Ulitsa Petra Metalnikova.

=== April ===
- April 1
  - (China) – Line 7 of the Hangzhou Metro is extended from Citizen Center to Wushan Square, and Line 9 is extended from Coach Center to Guanyintang.
  - (United Kingdom) (Scotland) – ScotRail takes over from Abellio ScotRail as operator of last resort of the ScotRail franchise.
- (India) April 2 – The first phases of Lines 2 and 7 of the Mumbai Metro open.
- (Czech Republic) April 9 – Line 5 of the Prague tram network is extended from Sídliště Barrandov to Holyně.
- (Poland) April 23 – Line 10 of the Poznań tram network is extended from Lechicka/Naramowicka to Błażeja.
- (Germany) April 25 – Line 2 of the Darmstadt tram network is extended from Hochschulstadion to TU-Lichtwiese.
- April 29
  - – Line 1 of the Shaoxing Metro is extended from China Textile City to Fangquan.
  - (China) – Line 5 of the Fuzhou Metro opens.

=== May ===
- May 1
  - (China) – Line 7 of the Guangzhou Metro is extended from Guangzhou South Railway Station to Meidi Dadao.
  - (China) – Opening of the first phase of the Fenghuang Maglev.
- (Hong Kong) May 6 – The MTR retires Metro-Cammell EMUs after 40 years of service.
- May 15 – The MTR East Rail line is extended across Victoria Harbour to Hong Kong Island.
- (Spain) May 17 – Line 10 of Metrovalencia opens.
- (United States) May 20 – The Tempe Streetcar opens in Tempe, Arizona.
- (United Kingdom) May 24 – The central section of Crossrail opens, and Crossrail and TfL Rail are officially branded the "Elizabeth line".
- May 28
  - (Denmark) – The Odense Letbane opens.
  - (South Korea) – The Shinbundang Line of the Seoul Metropolitan Subway is extended from Gangnam to Sinsa, and the Sillim Line opens.
- (Kazakhstan) May 30 – Line 1 of the Almaty Metro is extended from Moskva to Bauyrzhan Momyshuly.
- (France) May 31 – Line 12 of the Paris Metro is extended from Front Populaire to Mairie d'Aubervilliers.

=== June ===
- (Germany) June 3 – Garmisch-Partenkirchen train derailment: A double-decker Regionalbahn passenger train derails near Burgrain in Bavaria, killing four people and injuring many more.
- (China) June 10 – Line 3 of the Hangzhou Metro is extended from Chaowang Road to West Wenyi Road, and the branch from South Xixi Wetland to Shima opens.
- (Australia) June 12 – The Gawler railway line reopens after an 18-month closure due to the electrification of the line.
- June 16
  - (China) – Opening of the Hotan–Ruoqiang railway, completing a 2,712-km loop line around the Taklamakan Desert.
  - – Partial opening of MRT Putrajaya line, Malaysia's fifth metro line, from Sungai Buloh/Kwasa Damansara to Kampong Batu.
- (Armenia) June 17 – A passenger train is introduced between Yerevan and Shoghakat.
- (China) June 18 – Line 4 of the Chongqing Rail Transit is extended from Tangjiatuo to Huangling.
- June 20
  - (China) – The Chengjiao line of the Zhengzhou Metro is extended from Xinzheng International Airport to Zhengzhou Hangkonggang Railway Station.
  - (Uzbekistan) (Tajikistan) – Passenger train is relaunched between Tashkent and Dushanbe.
- (China) June 24 – Line 10 of the Hangzhou Metro is extended from Cuibai Road to Xueyuan Road.
- (China) June 25 – The Jiaxing Tram is extended from Jiaxing Railway Station to East Zhongshan Road/Anle Road.
- (Philippines) June 26 – Reopening of the PNR South Main Line stretch from San Pablo to Lucena after a period of suspension starting October 2013, as part of the PNR South Long Haul.
- (China) June 28 – Line 6 of the Changsha Metro opens.
- (China) June 29 – Line 5 of the Kunming Metro opens.
- (Poland) June 30 – Line M2 of the Warsaw Metro is extended west from Księcia Janusza to Bemowo.

=== July ===
- (Spain) July 1 – Connection between Madrid Atocha and Madrid Chamartín opens.
- (Turkey) July 2 – Line T2 of the Bursa tramway opens.
- (Egypt) July 3 – Opening of the initial route of the Cairo Light Rail Transit.
- July 6 – Île-de-France tramway Line 13 opens.
- (India) July 14 – Green Line of the Kolkata Metro is extended from Phoolbagan to Sealdah.
- (United Kingdom) July 17 – Line 1 of the West Midlands Metro is extended from Birmingham Library to Edgbaston.
- (United Kingdom) July 18 – London Overground extension to Barking Riverside opens.
- (China) July 22 – Opening of the initial section of the Dali–Ruili railway.
- (United States) July 29 – Amtrak extends the Ethan Allen Express to Union Station in Burlington, Vermont.
- (China) July 30 – Four infill stations open on Line 19 of the Beijing Subway.

=== August ===
- (China) August 6 – The Chongqing Rail Transit Jiangtiao line opens between Tiaodeng and Shengquansi.
- (United States) August 21 – The SEPTA Regional Rail Media/Elwyn Line is extended from Elwyn to Wawa, and the line is renamed the Media/Wawa Line.
- (China) August 28 – Line 6 of the Fuzhou Metro opens.
- August 29
  - (France) – Line T3 of the Caen tramway is extended from Collège Hawking to Fleury-sur-Orne.
  - (Poland) – Opening of the section between Łagiewniki and Kurdwanów on the Kraków tramway.
- (China) August 30 – Full opening of the Jinyi section of Jinhua Rail Transit's Jinyidong line.
- (Russia) August 31 – Opening of the Yekaterinburg interurban tram Route 333, connecting Yekaterinburg to Verkhnyaya Pyshma.

=== September ===
- (India) September 1 – The Kochi Metro is extended from Pettah to SN Junction.
- (China) September 6 – Opening of the initial section of the Changde–Yiyang–Changsha high-speed railway.
- September 11 – Line T1 of the Luxembourg tramway is extended to Lycée Bonnevoie.
- (France) September 12 – RATP introduces automated trains on Line 4 of the Paris Metro.
- (Bolivia) September 13 – Opening of the Red Line and the first phase of the Green Line of Mi Tren in Cochabamba.
- (France) September 20 – Line B of the Rennes Metro opens.
- September 22
  - (China) – Hangzhou Metro Line 3 is extended from West Wenyi Road to Wushanqiancun, Line 10 is extended from Xueyuan Road to Huanglong Sports Center, and Line 19 opens.
  - (China) – Opening of the final section (Huzhou–Hangzhou) of the Shangqiu–Hangzhou high-speed railway.
- (Japan) September 23 – Opening of the initial section of the Nishi Kyushu Shinkansen.
- (Canada) September 24 – Line 1 Yonge–University of the Toronto subway introduces automatic train control across the full length of the line.
- (Poland) September 28 – Line M2 of the Warsaw Metro is extended east from Trocka to Bródno.
- September 30
  - (China) – Line S8 of the Nanjing Metro is extended south from Taishanxincun to Changjiangdaqiaobei.
  - (China) – Line 2 of the Dalian Metro is extended from Xinzhaizi to Dalian North railway station.
  - (China) – Line 6 of the Zhengzhou Metro opens from Jiayu to Changzhuang.
  - (United States) – All rail service between Irvine and Oceanside, California was suspended due to coastal erosion under the track in San Clemente. Service along the Surf Line was restored the following April.

=== October ===
- October 2
  - (India) – The East-West Corridor of the Ahmedabad Metro begins service.
  - (Turkey) – Line M4 of the Istanbul Metro is extended from Tavşantepe to Sabiha Gökçen Airport.
- (United States) October 3 – The Long Island Rail Road's Third Track Project between Floral Park and Hicksville is completed.
- (Taiwan) October 5 – The Kaohsiung Metro's Circular light rail is extended from TRA Museum of Fine Arts to Heart of Love River.
- October 6
  - (Egypt) – Opening of Phase 3-1 of Cairo Metro Line 3, linking Attaba to Kit-Kat.
  - (India) – The North-South Corridor of the Ahmedabad Metro begins service.
- (United States) October 7 – The northern portion of the Los Angeles Metro Rail's K Line opens after several delays.
- (Australia) October 9 – Transperth's Airport line opens between High Wycombe and Claremont.
- October 10
  - (Greece) – Line 3 of the Athens Metro is extended from Nikaia to Dimotiko Theatro.
  - (Mauritius) – The Metro Express is extended from Phoenix to Curepipe Central.
- (Finland) October 17 – Line 9 of the Helsinki tram network is extended from Pasila to Ilmalantori.
- (United States) October 24 – Arrow begins service in Redlands, California.
- (Spain) October 26 – Cádiz Bay tram-train begun operation.
- October 28
  - (China) – Shenzhen Metro Line 11 is extended from Futian to Gangxia North and Line 14 opens.
  - (Turkey) – Line F4 of the Istanbul Metro network opens.
- (Indonesia) October 29 – The Trans-Sulawesi Railway opens between Barru and Pangkep on a limited basis.

=== November ===
- (Czech Republic) November 1 – The Olomouc tramway is extended from Trnkova to U Kapličky.
- (Turkey) November 5 – Gaziantep's Gaziray starts operation.
- (United Kingdom) November 6 – Elizabeth line direct service commenced between Paddington and Shenfield and between Reading and Heathrow to Abbey Wood.
- (China) November 10 – Opening of Line 1 of the Nantong Rail Transit.
- (Singapore) November 13 – Opening of Stage 3 of the MRT Thomson–East Coast line.
- (United States) November 15 – The Washington Metro Silver Line is extended to Ashburn via Dulles International Airport.
- (China) November 18 – Line 10 of the Tianjin Metro opens.
- (United States) November 19 – Central Subway in San Francisco opens after repeated delays.
- (Norway) November 21 – Opening of the Bergen Light Rail Line 2 between Byparken and Fyllingsdalen.
- (Italy) November 26 – The first section of Milan Metro Line 4 opens between Dateo and Linate Aeroporto.
- (China) November 28 – Lines 6B and 12 of the Shenzhen Metro open.
- (China) November 29 – Nanhai Tram Line 1 extends from Sanshanxinchengbei to Linyuedong.

=== December ===
- (China) December 1 – Line 2 of the Ningbo Rail Transit extends from Congyuan Road to Honglian.
- (Finland) December 3 – Line M1 of the Helsinki Metro extends from Matinkylä to Kivenlahti.
- (Germany) December 9 – Opening of Wendlingen–Ulm high-speed railway.
- December 11
  - (Czech Republic) – Opening of the Osová-Nemocnice Bohunice tram line in Brno.
  - (India) – The Aqua Line of the Nagpur Metro is extended from Sitabuldi to Prajapati Nagar, while the Orange Line is extended from Kasturchand Park to Automative Square.
  - (Norway) – The Follo Line opened after delays.
  - (Switzerland) – Opening of the Limmattalerbahn, a LRT line connecting the Limmatvalley with Zurich as Line 20 in the network.
- (United States) December 12 – Opening of the Medford Branch of the Green Line Extension to Somerville and Medford, Massachusetts.
- (South Korea) December 17 - Paju's Uncheon Station on the Gyeongui-Jungang Line opens.
- (Poland) December 19 – The Silesian Interurbans is extended from Zagórze BMC (formerly named Zagórze Petla) to Zagórze Rondo Jana Pawla II.
- (United States) December 20 – The PHX Sky Train is extended from Terminal 3 to Rental Car Center.
- (United States) December 21 – Brightline opens new infill stations at Aventura and Boca Raton.
- (Azerbaijan) December 23 – The Purple Line of the Baku Metro is extended from Avtovağzal to Xocəsən.
- December 26
  - (China) – Line 5 of the Hefei Metro is extended from Wanghuchengxi to Jiqiao Road.
  - (China) – Opening of Line 4 of the Qingdao Metro.
- December 28
  - (Bangladesh) – The first phase of the Dhaka Metro from Utara to Agargaon opened.
  - (China) – Opening of Line S1 of the Taizhou Rail Transit.
  - (China) – Opening of the Yidong section of the Jinyidong line of the Jinhua Rail Transit.
  - (China) – Opening of the Huangshi Modern Tram.
  - (China) – Opening of Line 1 of the Pingshan SkyShuttle.
  - (China) – Opening of Line 16 of the Shenzhen Metro.
  - (China) – Line 1 of the Nanjing Metro is extended from Baguazhoudaqiaonan to Maigaoqiao, while Line 7 begins operation.
  - (China) – Opening of Line 3 of the Foshan Metro.
- (China) December 29 – Line 6 of the Xi'an Metro is extended from Xibeigongyedaxue to Fangzhicheng.
- December 30
  - (China) – Line 7 of the Wuhan Metro is extended from Garden Expo North to Hengdian, Line 16 is extended from Zhoujiahe to Hannan General Airport.
  - (India) – Opening of Purple Line of the Kolkata Metro.
- (China) December 31 – Line 16 of the Beijing Subway is extended from Yuyuantan Dongmen (Yuyuantan Park East Gate) to Yushuzhuang.

== Industry awards ==
=== North America ===
Awards presented by Railway Age magazine

- 2022 Railroader of the Year: Keith Creel (CP) and Patrick J. Ottensmeyer (KCS)
