= Gaojiao Road station =

Metro station in Hangzhou, China

Gaojiao Road 高教路
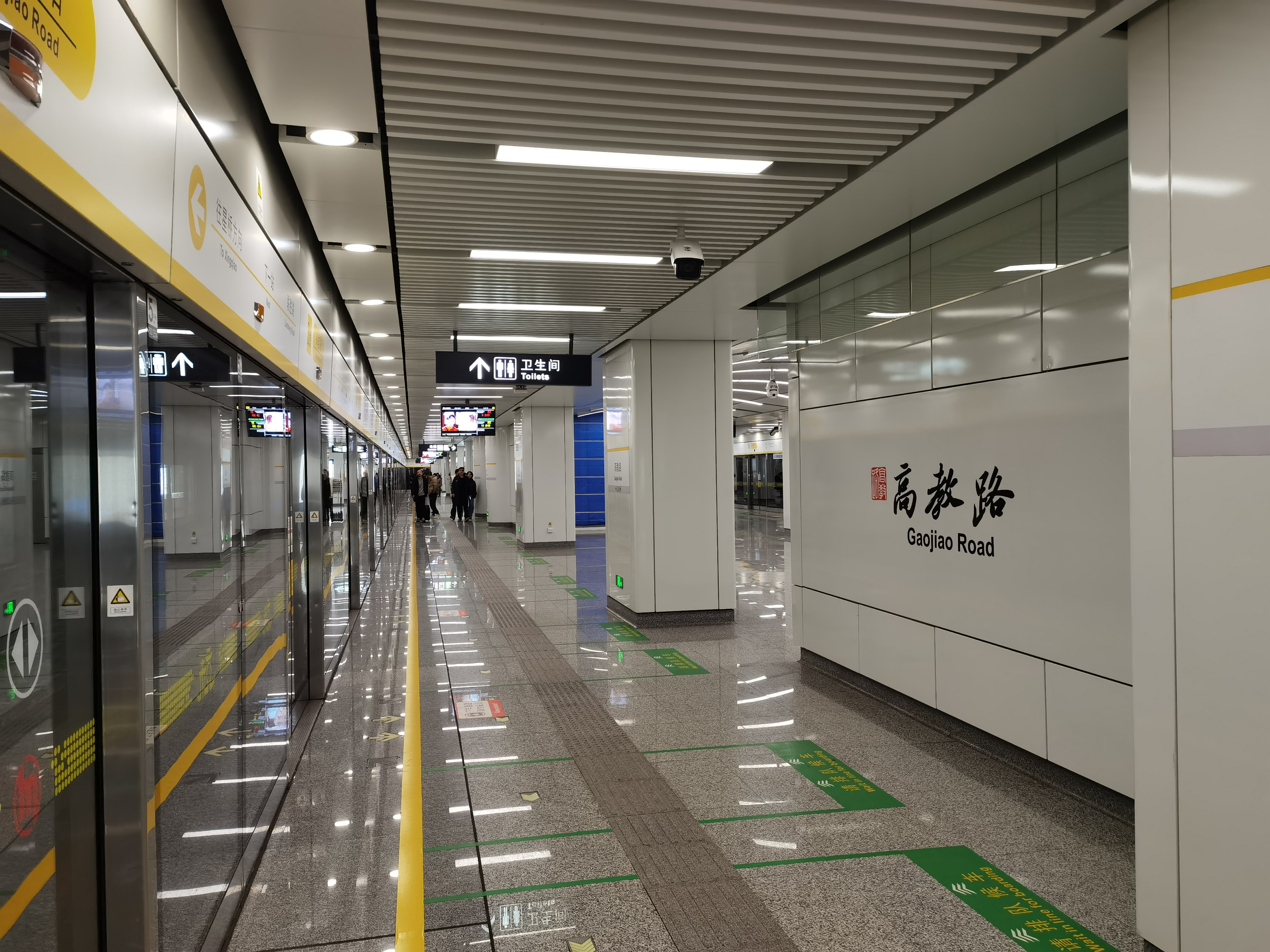

General information
- Location: Yuhang District, Hangzhou, Zhejiang; China
- Coordinates: 30.2453°N 120.0147°E
- Operated by: Hangzhou Metro Corporation
- Line: Line 3
- Platforms: 2 (1 island platform)

History
- Opened: 10 June 2022

Services
Preceding station	Hangzhou Metro	Following station
Quanfeng towards Wushanqiancun	Line 3	Liansheng Road towards Xingqiao
Location

Gaojiao Road (Chinese: 高教路) is a metro station of Line 3 of the Hangzhou Metro in China. It is located in Yuhang District of Hangzhou. The station was opened on 10 June 2022.
