= Gudang station =

Metro station in Hangzhou, China

Gudang 古荡
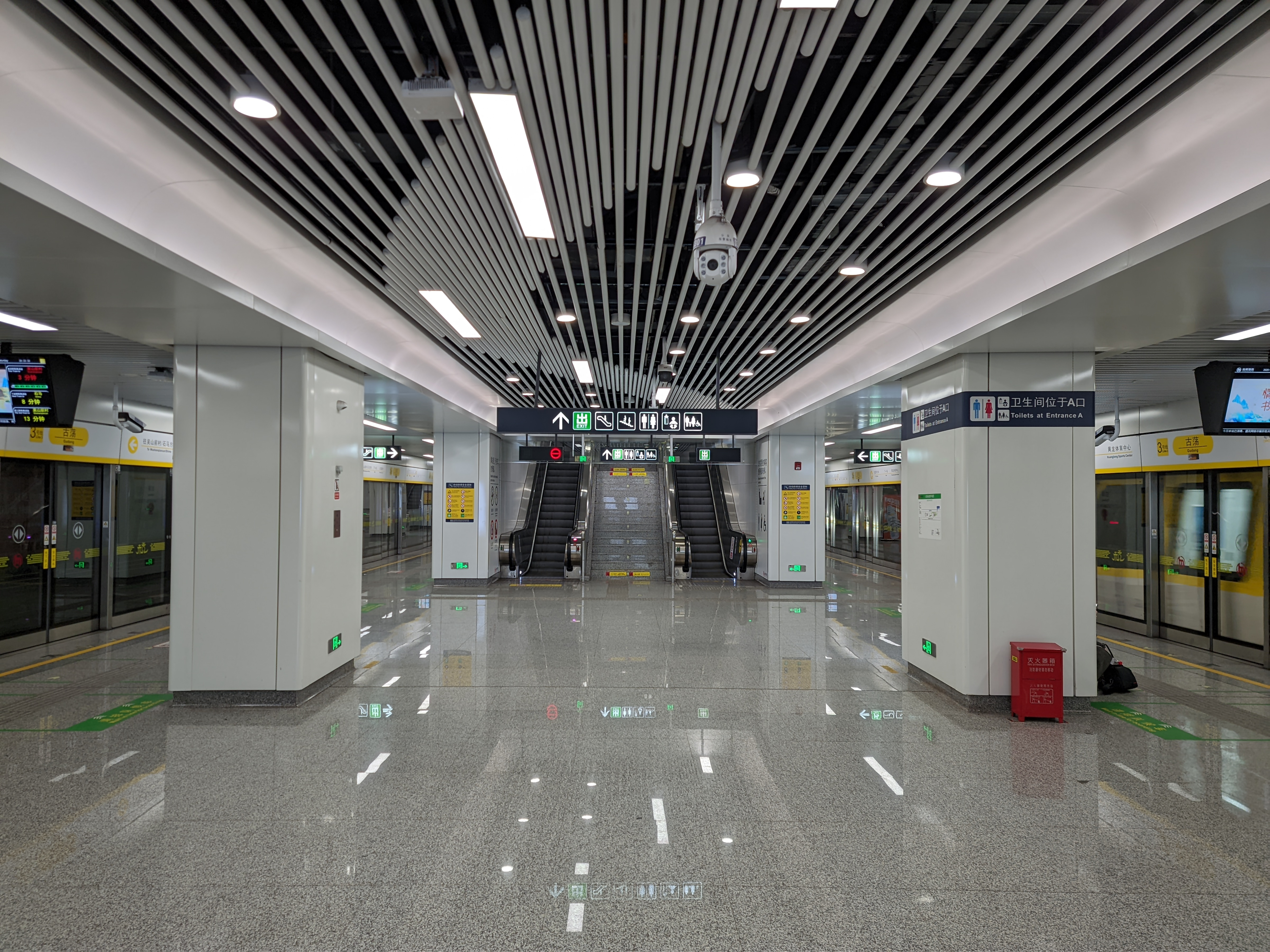
- Platforms

General information
- Location: Xixi Road × Wantang Road; Xihu District, Hangzhou, Zhejiang; China
- Coordinates: 30.2732°N 120.1174°E
- System: Hangzhou metro station
- Operator: Hangzhou Metro Corporation
- Line: Line 3
- Platforms: 2 (1 island platform)

Construction
- Structure type: Underground
- Accessible: Yes

History
- Opened: 10 June 2022

Services
Preceding station	Hangzhou Metro	Following station
Gudang Xincun towards Wushanqiancun or Shima	Line 3	Huanglong Sports Center towards Xingqiao
Location

Gudang (simplified Chinese: 古荡; traditional Chinese: 古蕩) is a metro station of Line 3 of the Hangzhou Metro in China. It is located in Xihu District of Hangzhou. The station was opened on 10 June 2022.

== Station layout ==
Gudang has three levels: a concourse, an equipment area for staffs, and an island platform with two tracks for line 3.

== Entrances/exits ==
- A: north side of Xixi Road
- B: south side of Xixi Road
- C: north side of Xixi Road, Wantang Road

== Gallery ==
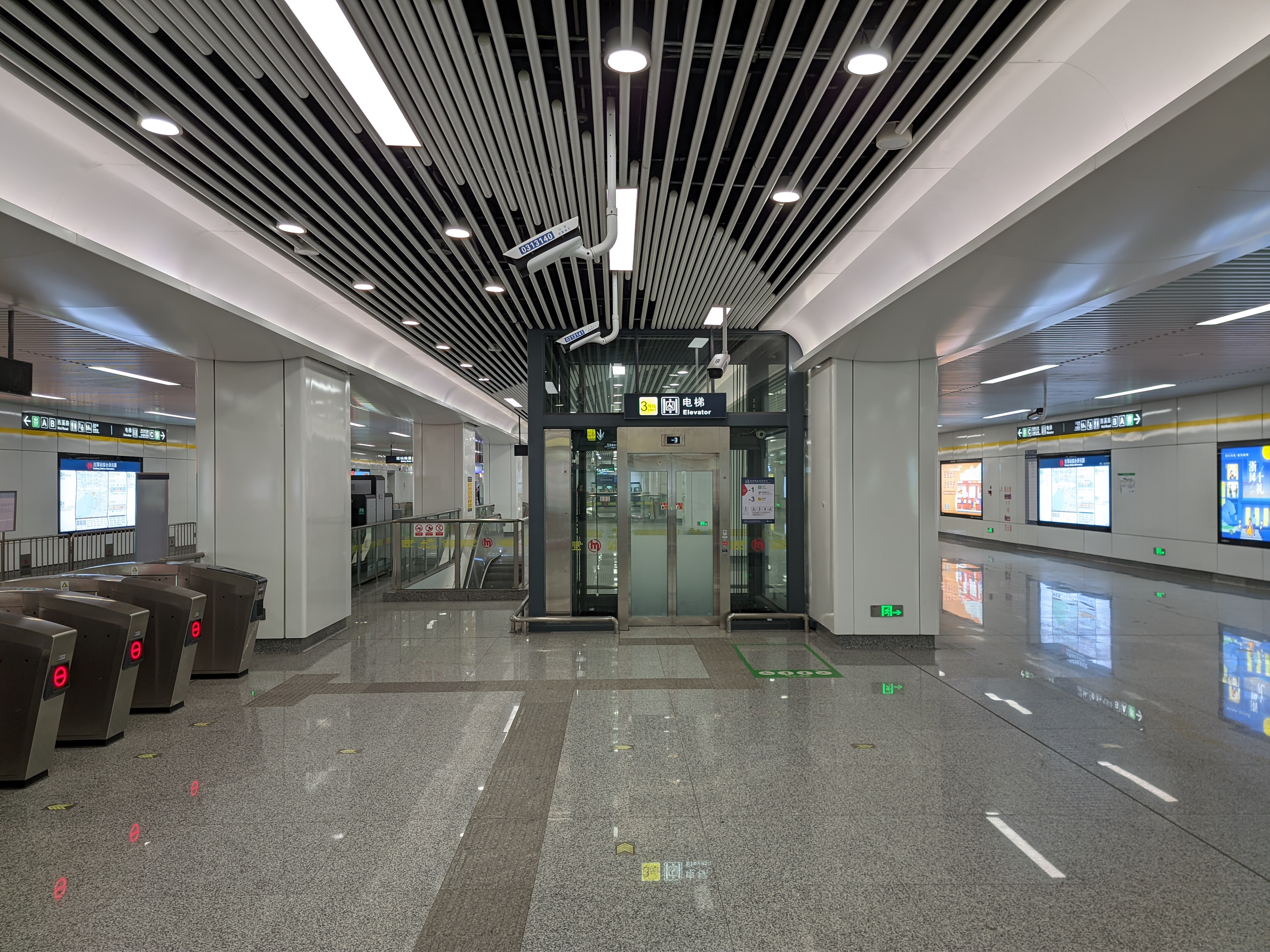
Concourse

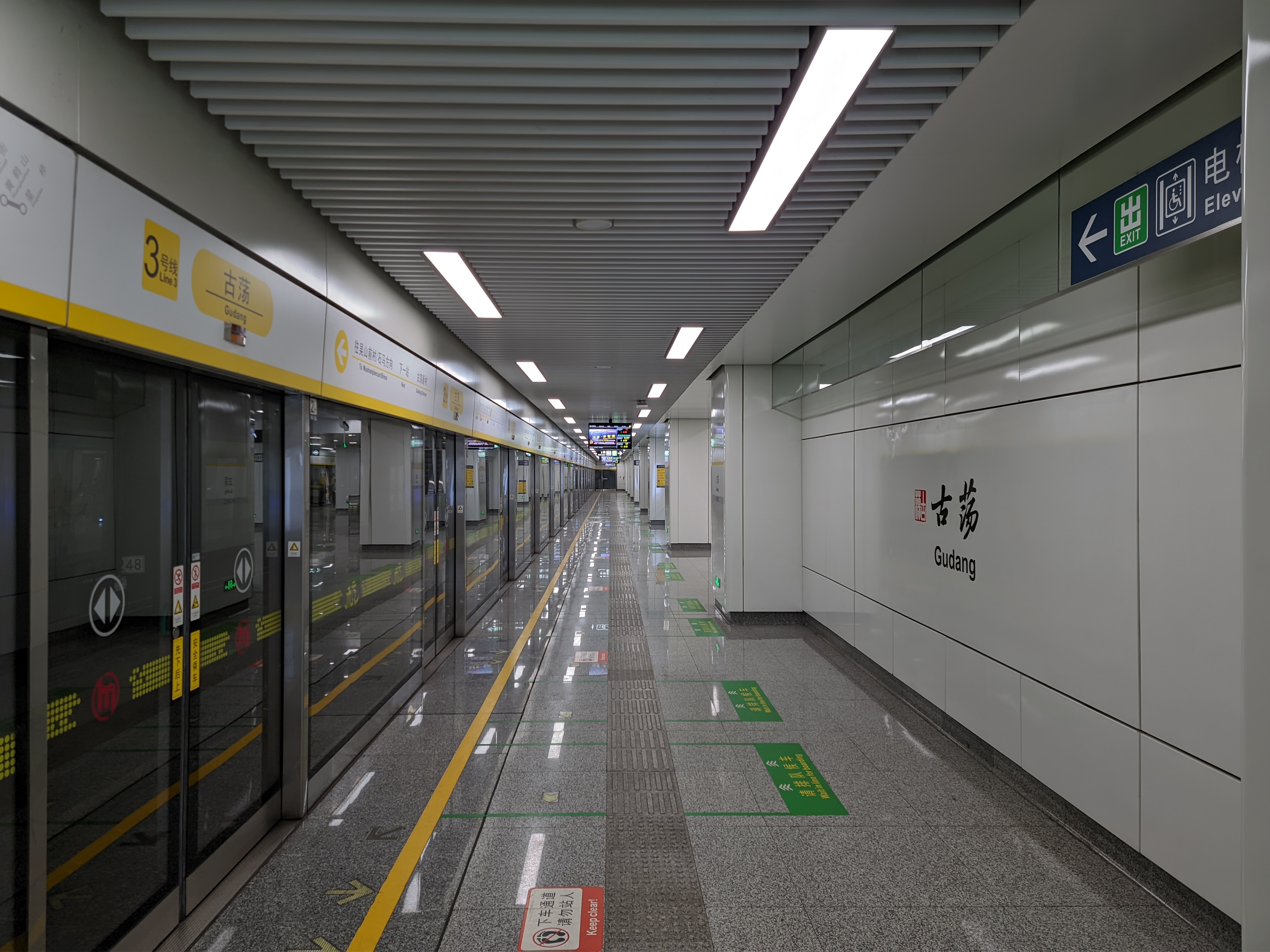
Platforms
