= Liansheng Road station =

Metro station in Hangzhou, China

Liansheng Road 联胜路
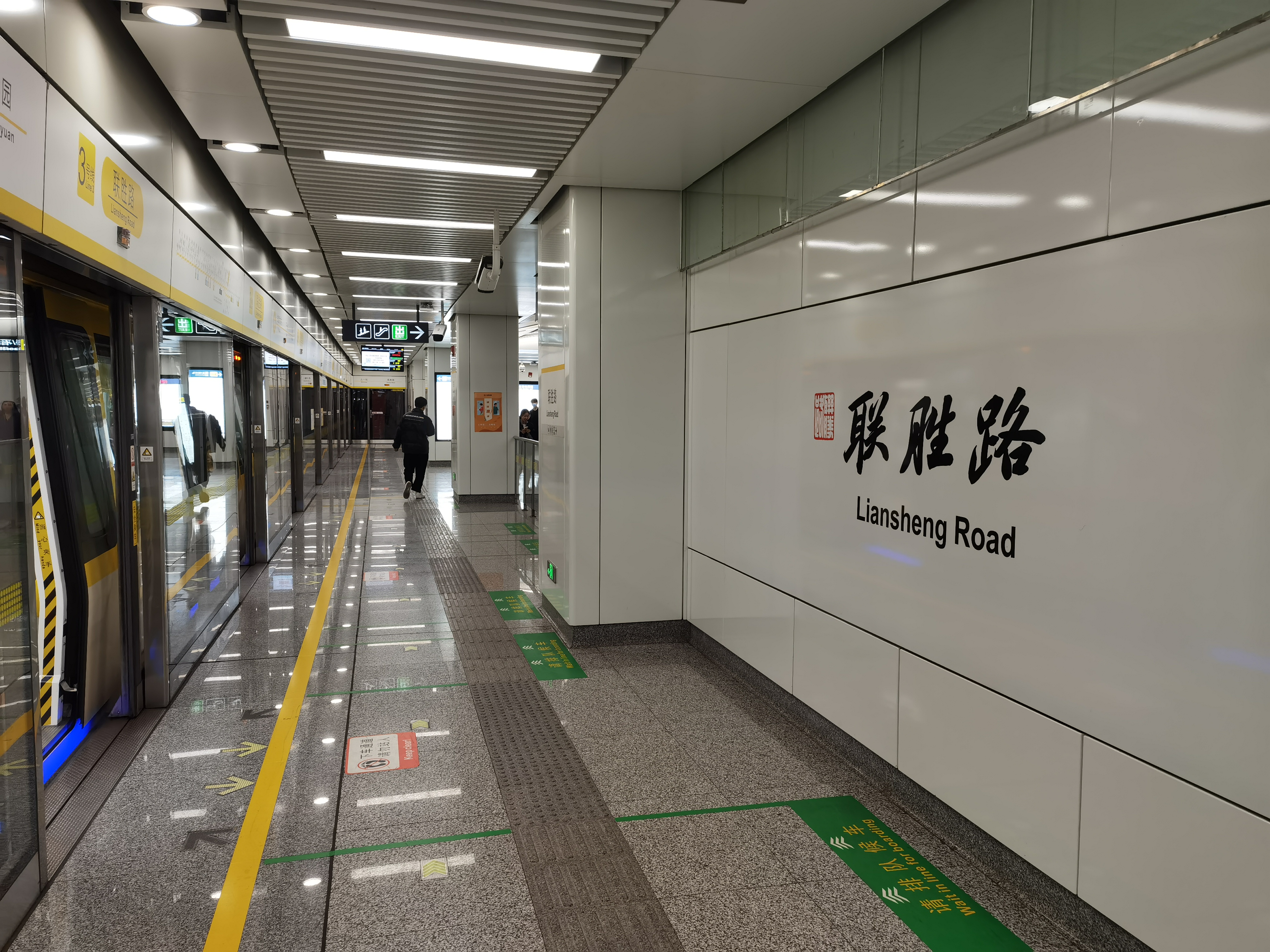

General information
- Location: Yuhang District, Hangzhou, Zhejiang; China
- Coordinates: 30.2468°N 120.0292°E
- Operated by: Hangzhou Metro Corporation
- Line: Line 3
- Platforms: 2 (1 island platform)

History
- Opened: 10 June 2022

Services
Preceding station	Hangzhou Metro	Following station
Gaojiao Road towards Wushanqiancun	Line 3	Hongyuan towards Xingqiao
Location

Liansheng Road (Chinese: 联胜路) is a metro station of Line 3 of the Hangzhou Metro in China. It is located in Yuhang District of Hangzhou. The station was opened on 10 June 2022.
