= North Longzhou Road station =

Metro station in Hangzhou, China

North Longzhou Road 龙舟北路
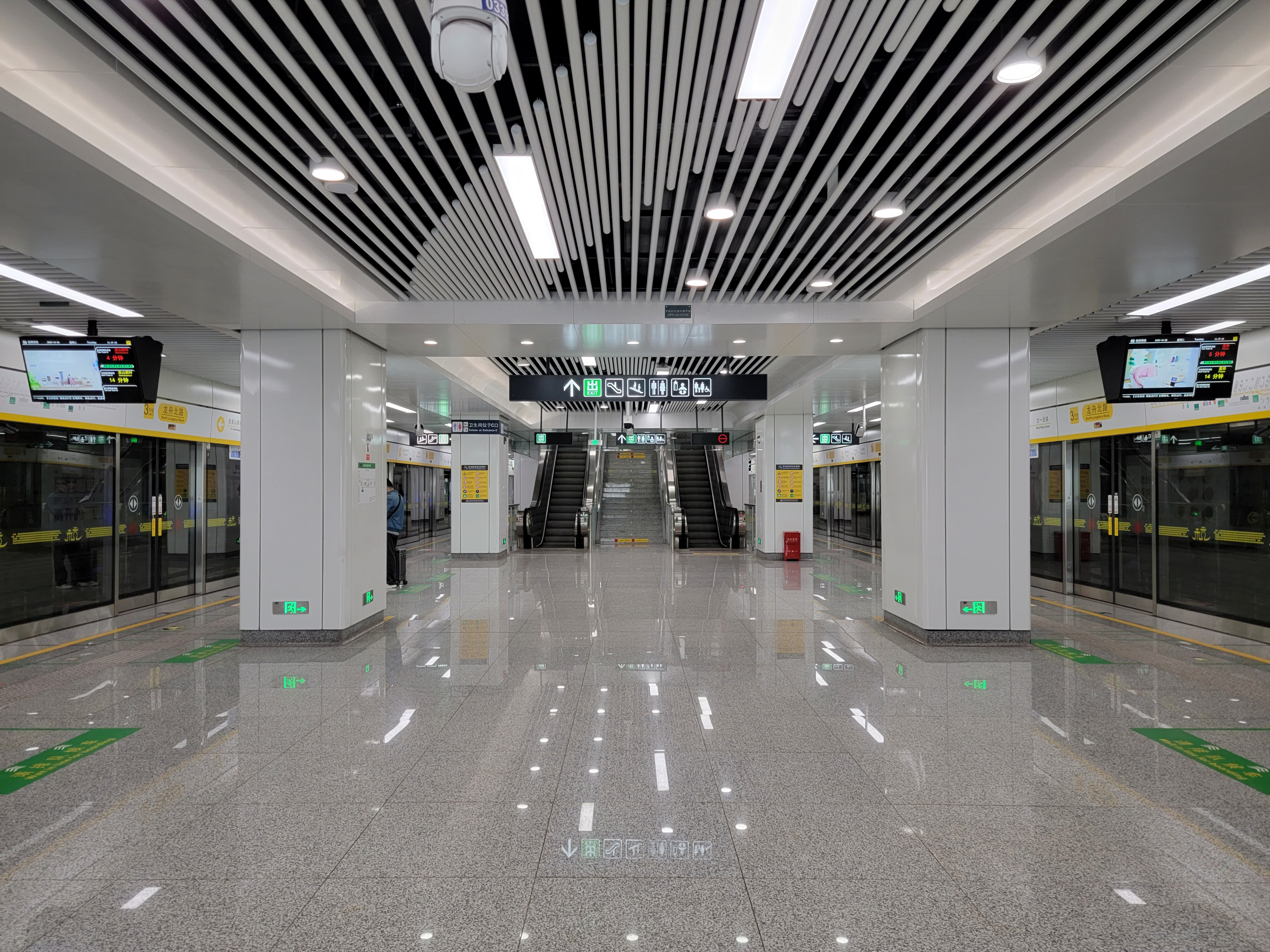
- Platforms

General information
- Location: Fangyun Street (访云街) × Longzhou Road (N) (龙舟北路); Yuhang District, Hangzhou, Zhejiang; China
- Coordinates: 30°17′26″N 119°58′41″E
- Operated by: Hangzhou Metro Corporation
- Line: Line 3
- Platforms: 2 (1 island platform)

Construction
- Structure type: Underground
- Accessible: Yes

History
- Opened: 22 September 2022

Services
Preceding station	Hangzhou Metro	Following station
West Railway Station towards Wushanqiancun	Line 3	West Wenyi Road towards Xingqiao
Route map
Location

North Longzhou Road (simplified Chinese: 龙舟北路; traditional Chinese: 龍舟北路) is a metro station of Line 3 of the Hangzhou Metro in China. It is located in Yuhang District of Hangzhou. The station was opened on 22 September 2022.

== Structure ==
North Longzhou Road has two levels: a concourse, and an island platform with two tracks for line 3.

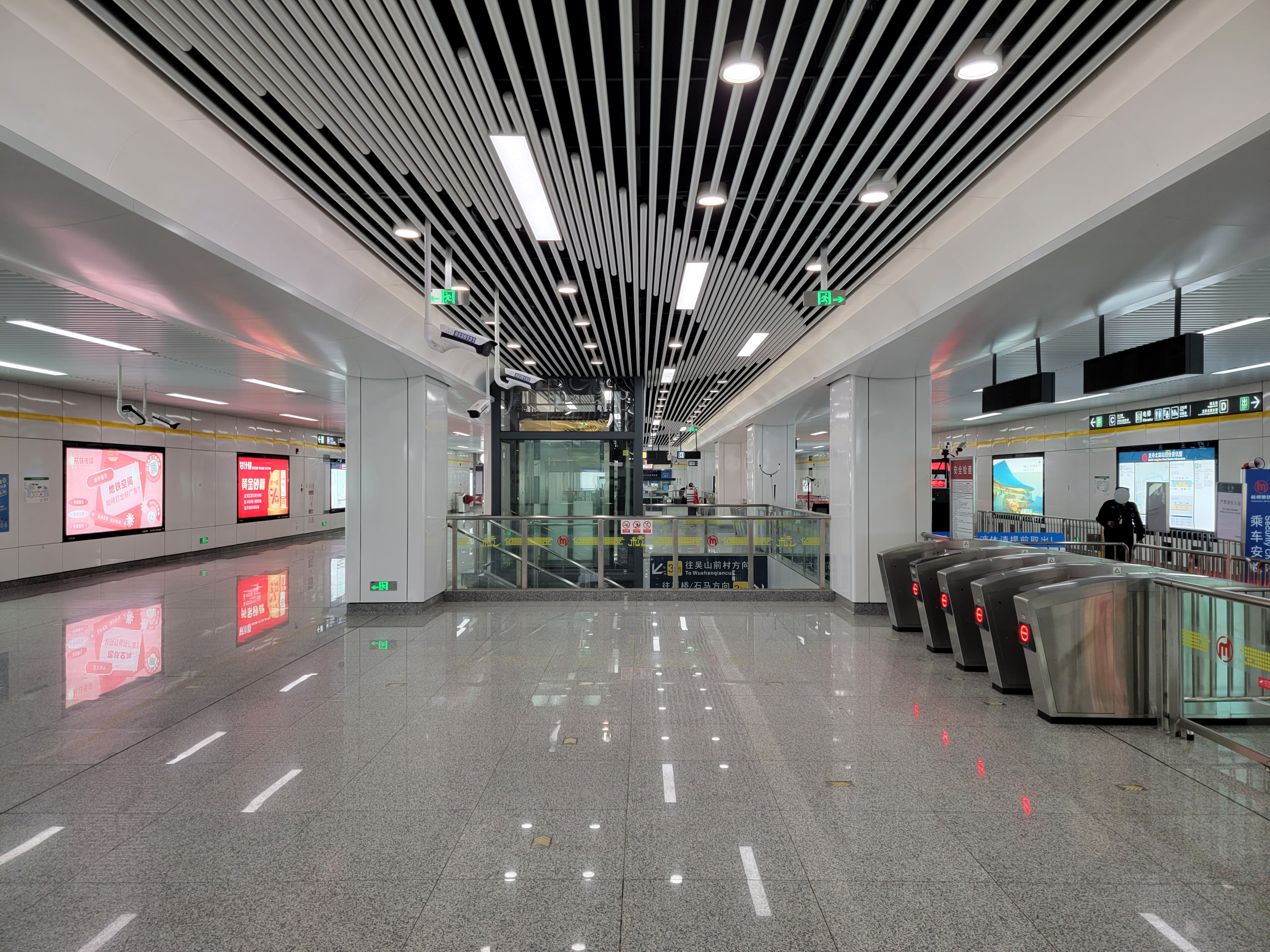
Concourse

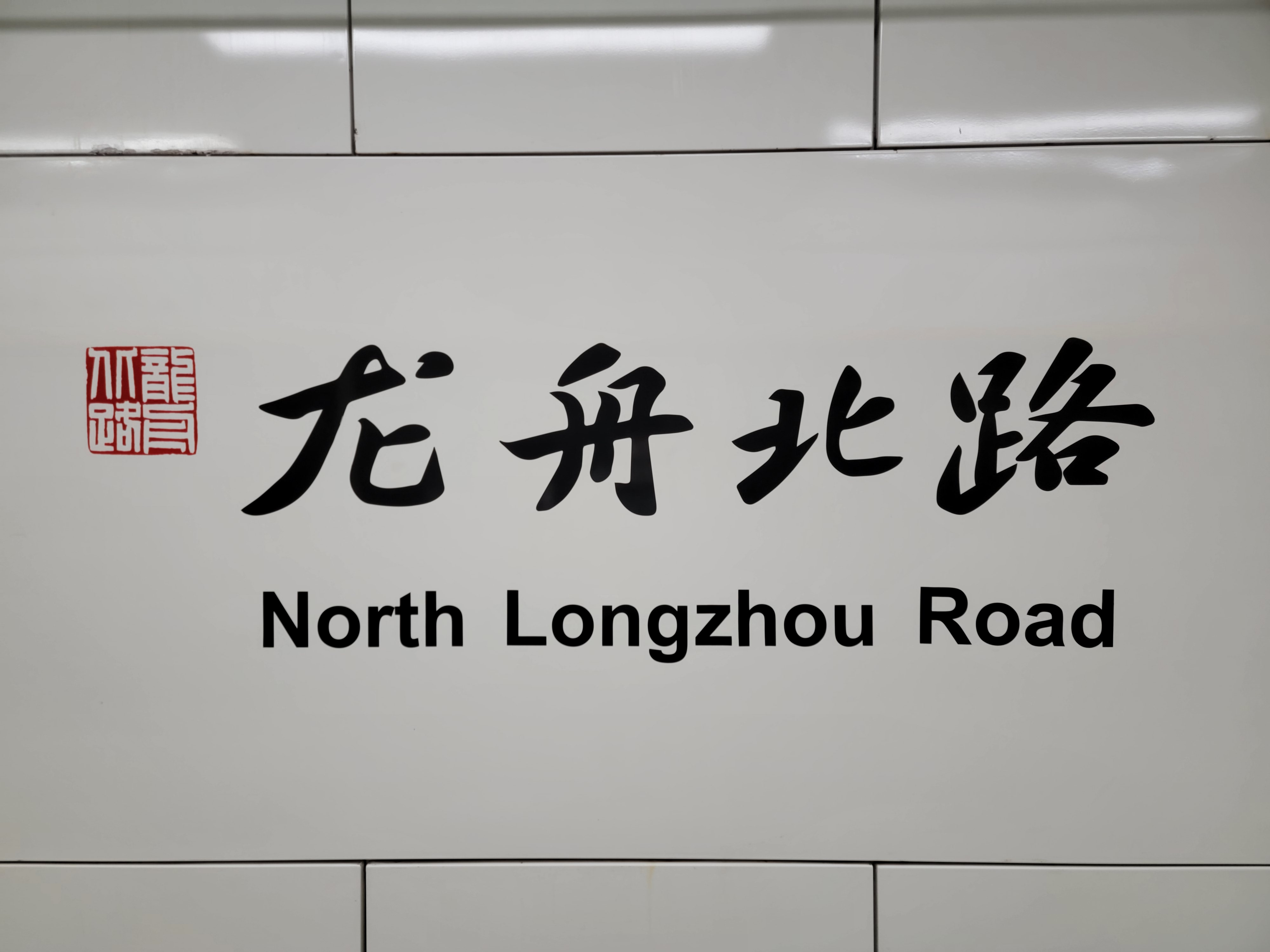
Station name in Chinese calligraphy

== Entrances/exits ==
- C: Hangyucheng community
- D: Headquarters Economy Park for Alumni Corporation of Zhejiang University
