= Liuxia station =

Metro station in Hangzhou, China

Liuxia 留下
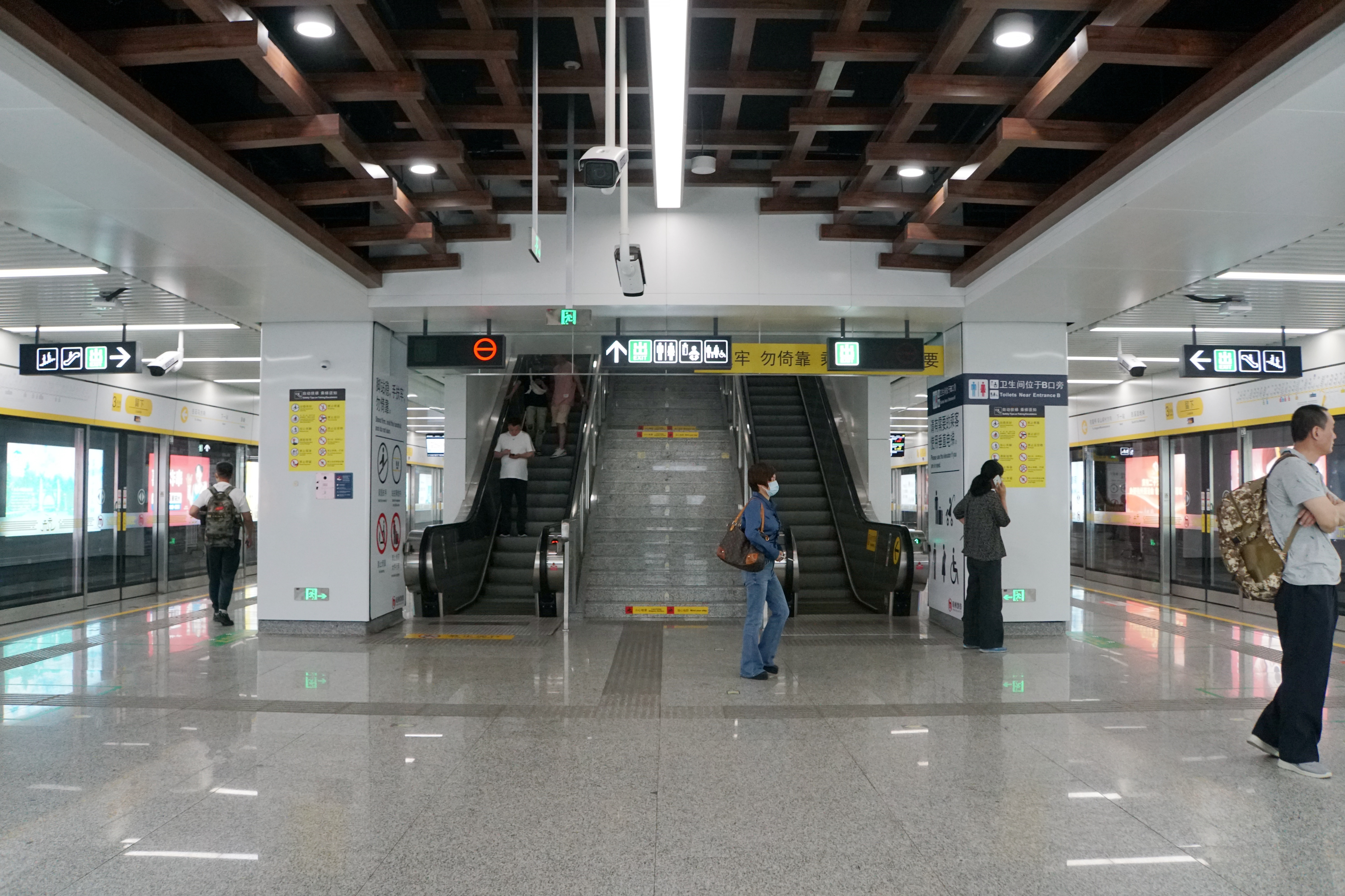
- Platform

General information
- Location: Xihu District, Hangzhou, Zhejiang; China
- Operated by: Hangzhou Metro Corporation
- Line: Line 3
- Platforms: 2 (1 island platform)

History
- Opened: 10 June 2022

Services
Preceding station	Hangzhou Metro	Following station
Pingfeng towards Shima	Line 3	South Xixi Wetland towards Xingqiao
Location

Liuxia (Chinese: 留下) is a metro station of Line 3 of the Hangzhou Metro in China. It is located in Xihu District of Hangzhou. The station was opened on 10 June 2022.
