= South Xixi Wetland station =

Metro station in Hangzhou, China

South Xixi Wetland 西溪湿地南
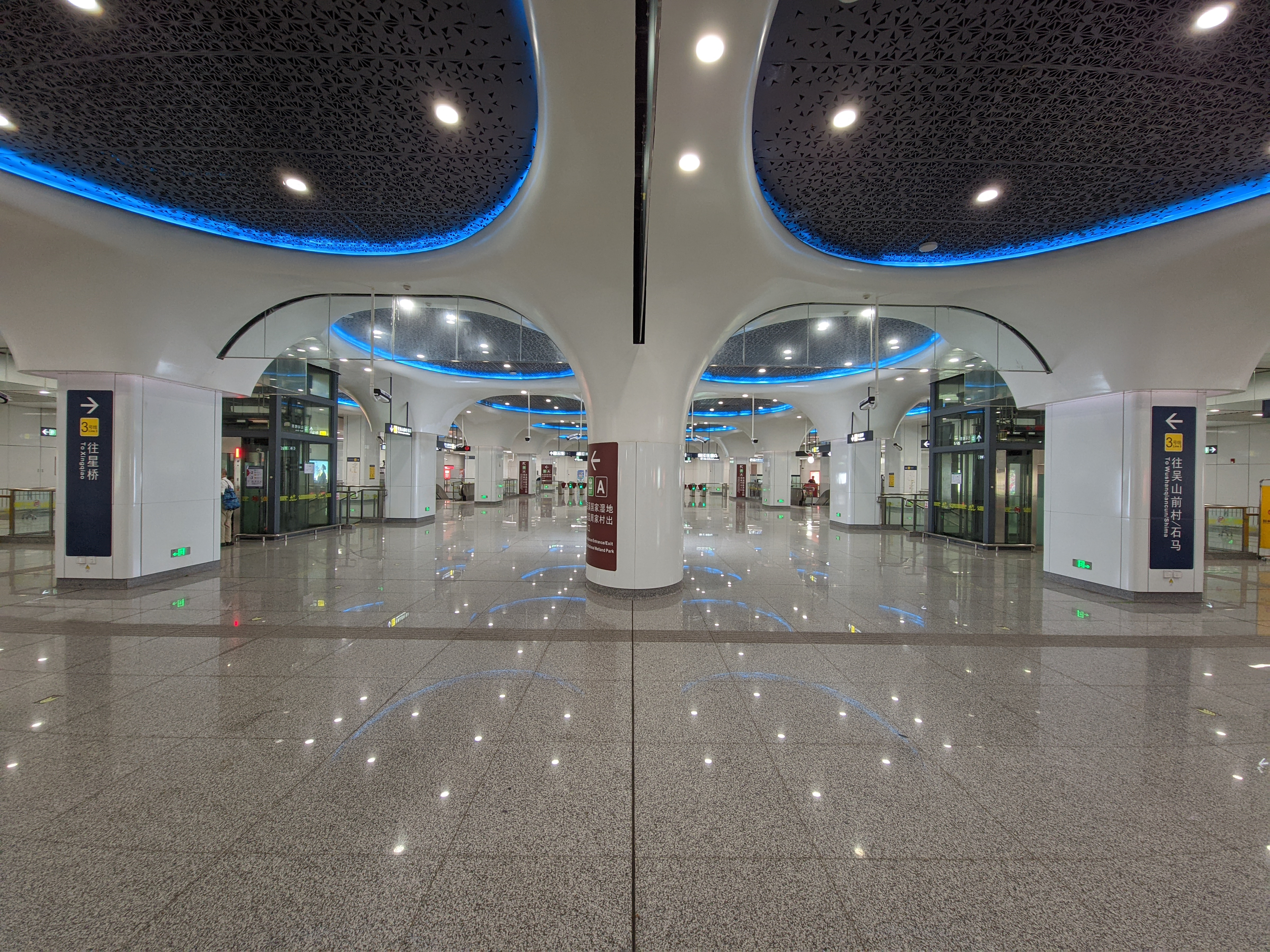
- Concourse

General information
- Location: Tianmushan Road; Xihu District, Hangzhou, Zhejiang; China
- Coordinates: 30.256006°N 120.056519°E
- System: Hangzhou metro station
- Operator: Hangzhou Metro Corporation
- Line: Line 3
- Platforms: 4 (2 island platforms)

Construction
- Structure type: Underground
- Accessible: Yes

History
- Opened: 10 June 2022

Services
Preceding station	Hangzhou Metro	Following station
Hongyuan towards Wushanqiancun	Line 3	Huawu towards Xingqiao
Liuxia towards Shima	Line 3	Huawu towards Xingqiao
Location

South Xixi Wetland (simplified Chinese: 西溪湿地南; traditional Chinese: 西溪濕地南) is a metro station of Line 3 of Hangzhou Metro in China, which opened on 10 June 2022. It is located in Xihu District of Hangzhou, adjacent to the Xixi National Wetland Park. Here Line 3 splits into two directions. The mainline heading toward Hangzhou West railway station in Yuhang District while the branch stretches into Xiaoheshan Higher Education Park in Xihu District.

== Station layout ==
South Xixi Wetland has two levels: a concourse, and two island platforms with four tracks for line 3. The inner side tracks will be used for Line 14 in the future.

== Design ==
South Xixi Wetland Station is themed of "Wetland Scenery" (Chinese: 湿地风光), combining a pond-shaped suspended ceiling with organic linear columns to showcase the natural network of waterways in the wetland. This design enhances the open space of the station hall, creating an artistic ambiance reminiscent of ink-wash paintings.

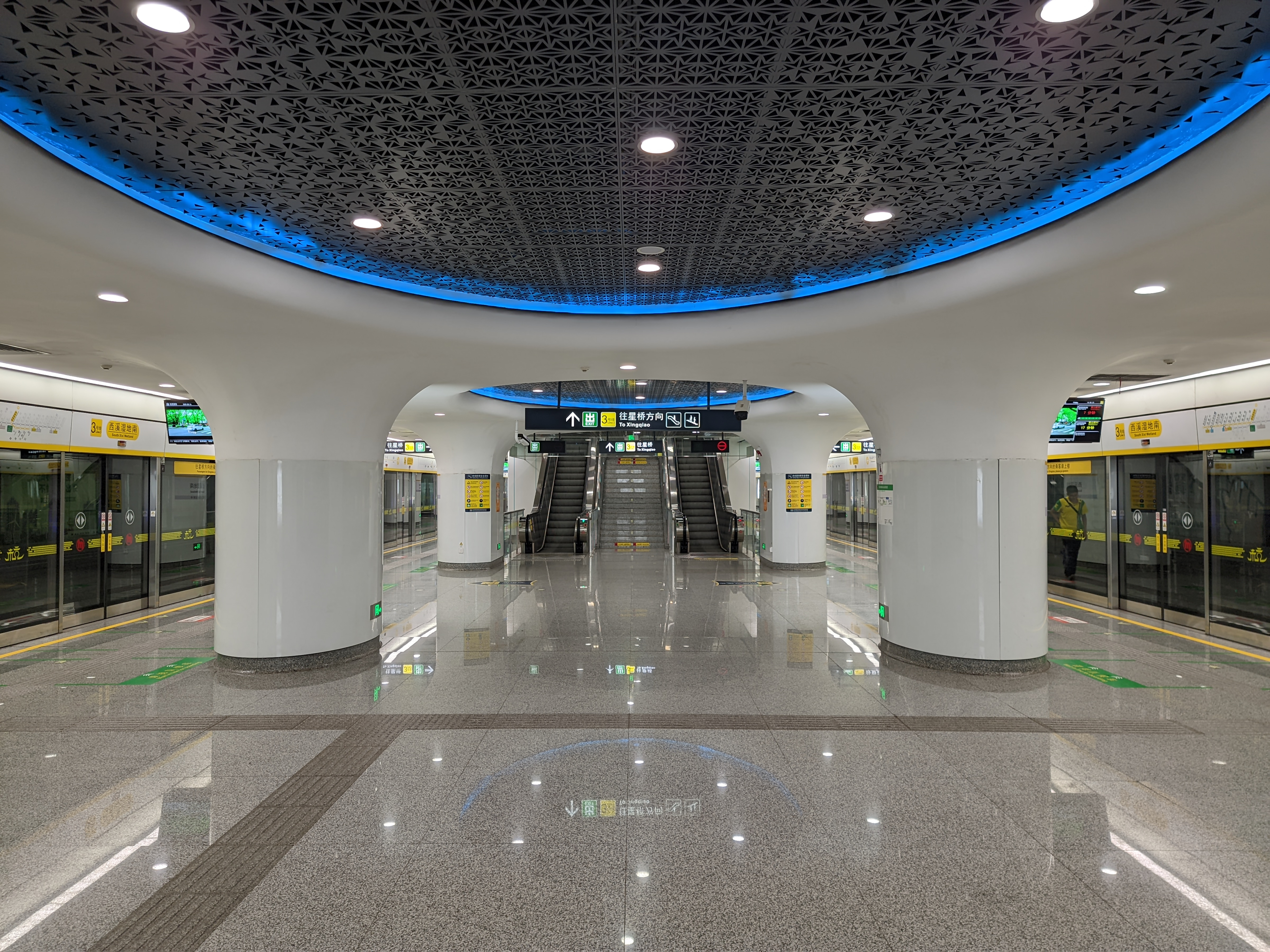
Platforms towards Wushanqiancun and Shima

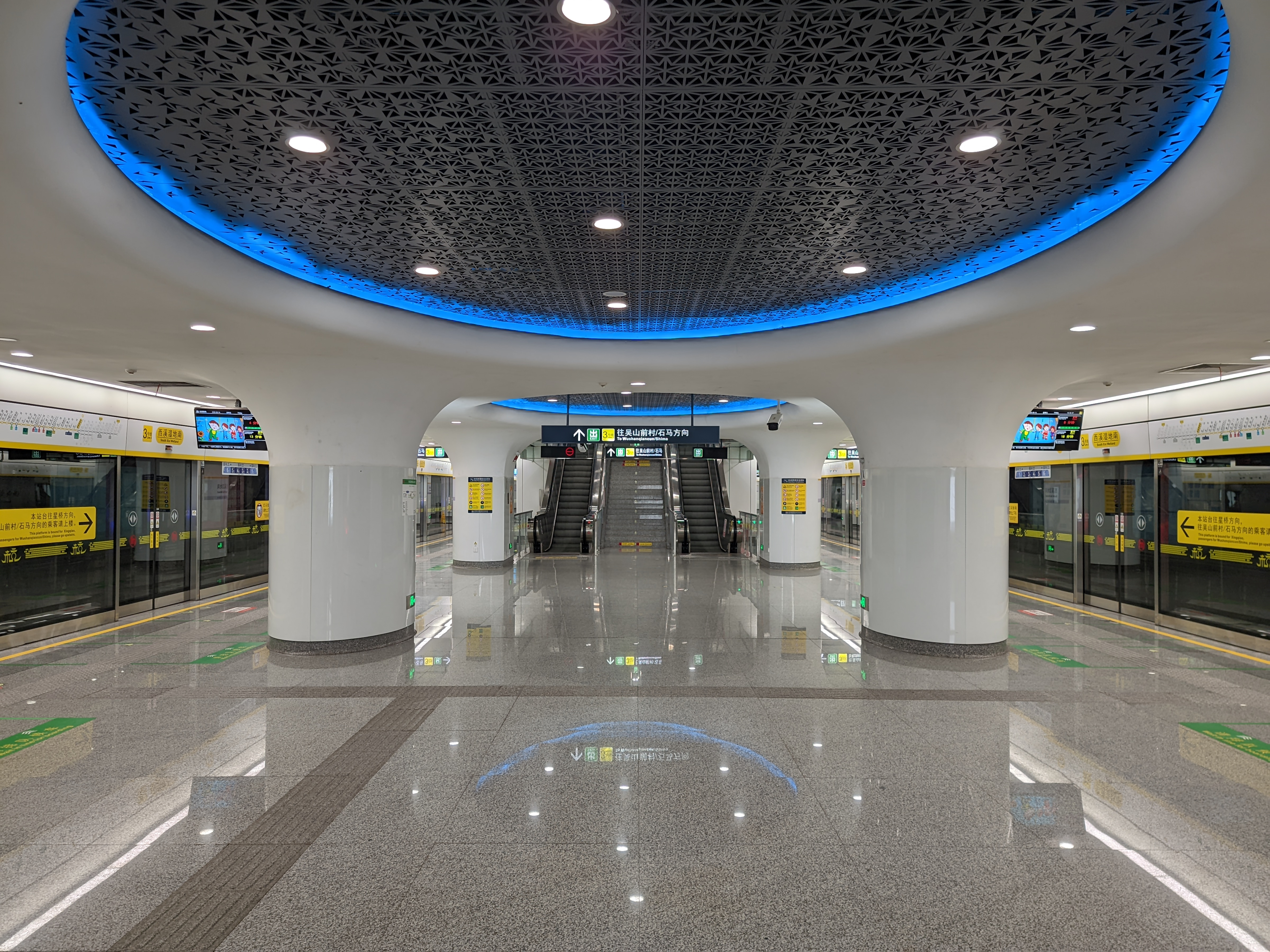
Platforms towards Xingqiao

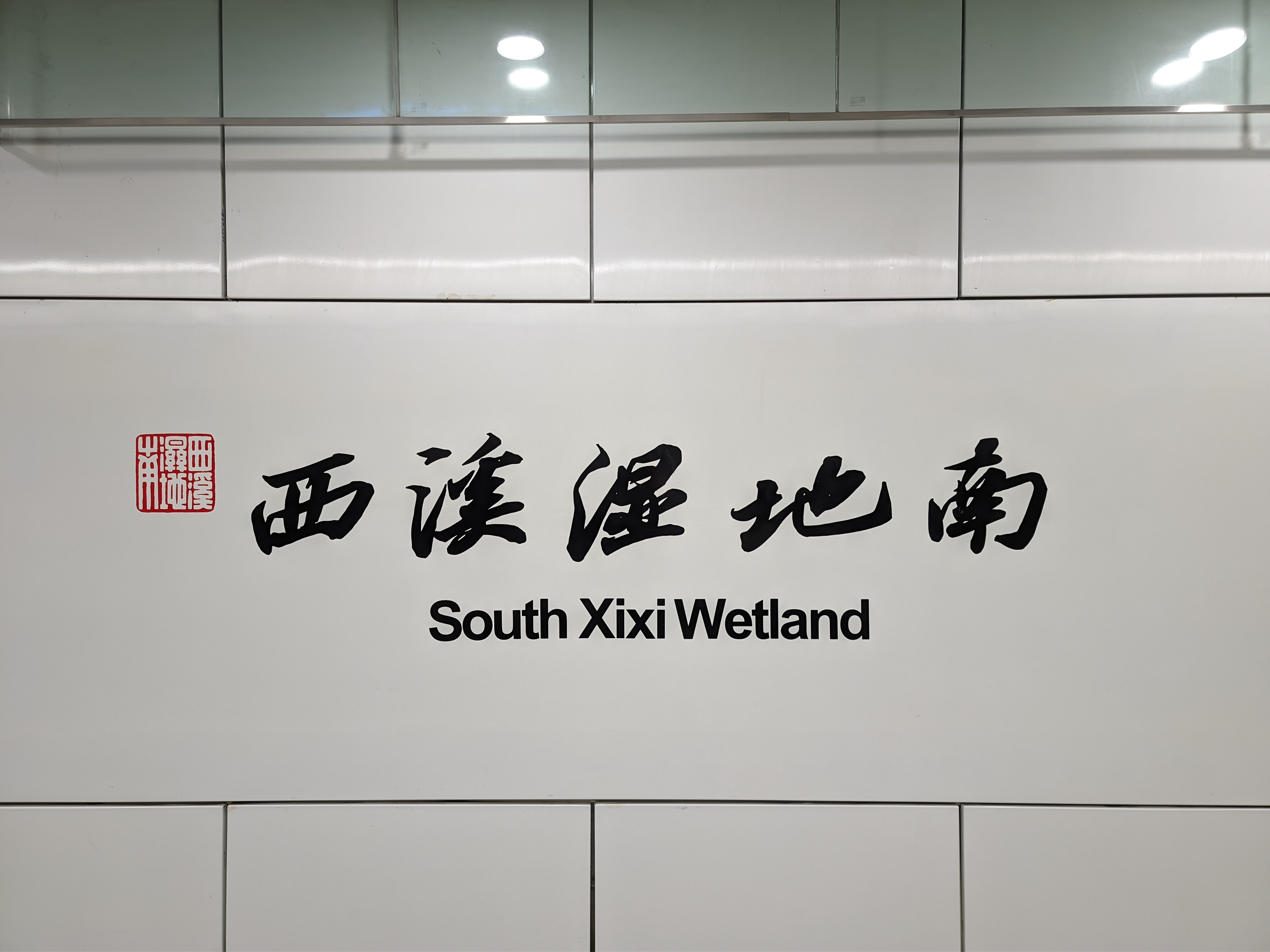
Station name in Chinese calligraphy

== Entrances/exits ==
- A: Zhoujiacun Entrance/exit of Xixi National Wetland Park
- B: Zhoujiacun Entrance/exit of Xixi National Wetland Park
- C: south side of Tianmushan Road, Baijiayuan Road
- D: south side of Tianmushan Road
- E: south side of Tianmushan Road
