= Tangjiacun station =

Metro station in Hangzhou, China

Tangjiacun 汤家村

General information
- Location: Yuhang District, Hangzhou, Zhejiang; China
- Operated by: Hangzhou Metro Corporation
- Line: Line 3
- Platforms: 2 (1 island platform)

Services
Preceding station	Hangzhou Metro	Following station
Wushanqiancun Terminus	Line 3	West Railway Station towards Xingqiao
Location

Tangjiacun (Chinese: 汤家村) is a metro station of Line 3 of the Hangzhou Metro in China. It is located in Yuhang District of Hangzhou. Because of lacking external links, it is not in service right now.
