= Chaowang Road station =

Metro station in Hangzhou, China

Chaowang Road 潮王路
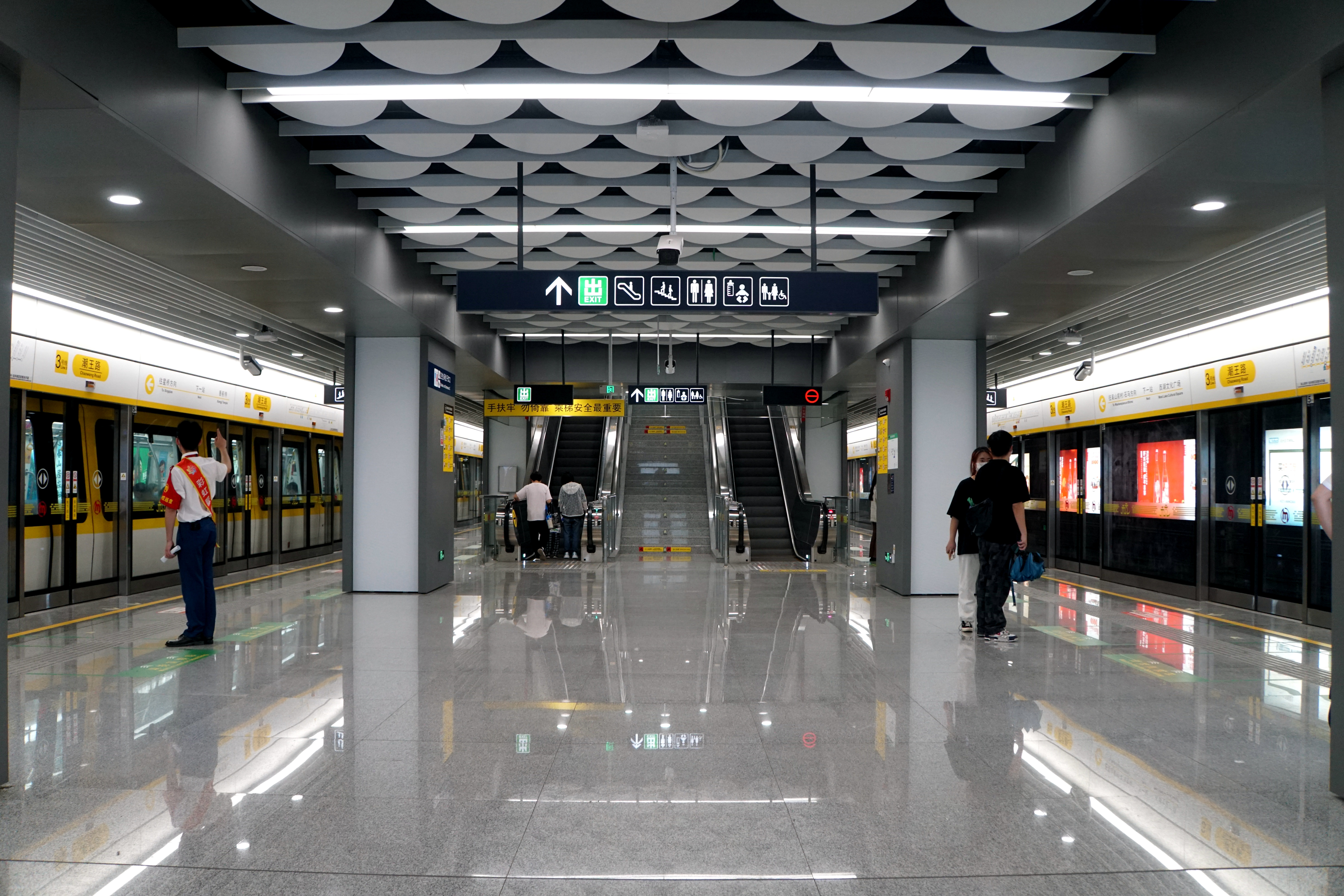
- Platforms

General information
- Location: Hedong Road × Chaowang Road/Huadian Alley; Gongshu District, Hangzhou, Zhejiang; China
- Coordinates: 30.29201°N 120.1543°E
- System: Hangzhou metro station
- Operator: Hangzhou Metro Corporation
- Line: Line 3
- Platforms: 2 (1 island platform)

Construction
- Structure type: Underground
- Accessible: Yes

History
- Opened: 21 February 2022

Services
Preceding station	Hangzhou Metro	Following station
West Lake Cultural Square towards Wushanqiancun or Shima	Line 3	Xiangji Temple towards Xingqiao
Location

Chaowang Road (Chinese: 潮王路) is a metro station of Line 3 of the Hangzhou Metro in China. It is located in Gongshu District of Hangzhou. The station was opened on 21 February 2022. Before 10 June 2022 it served as the western terminus of Line 3.

== Station layout ==
Chaowang Road has two levels: a concourse, and an island platform with two tracks for line 3.

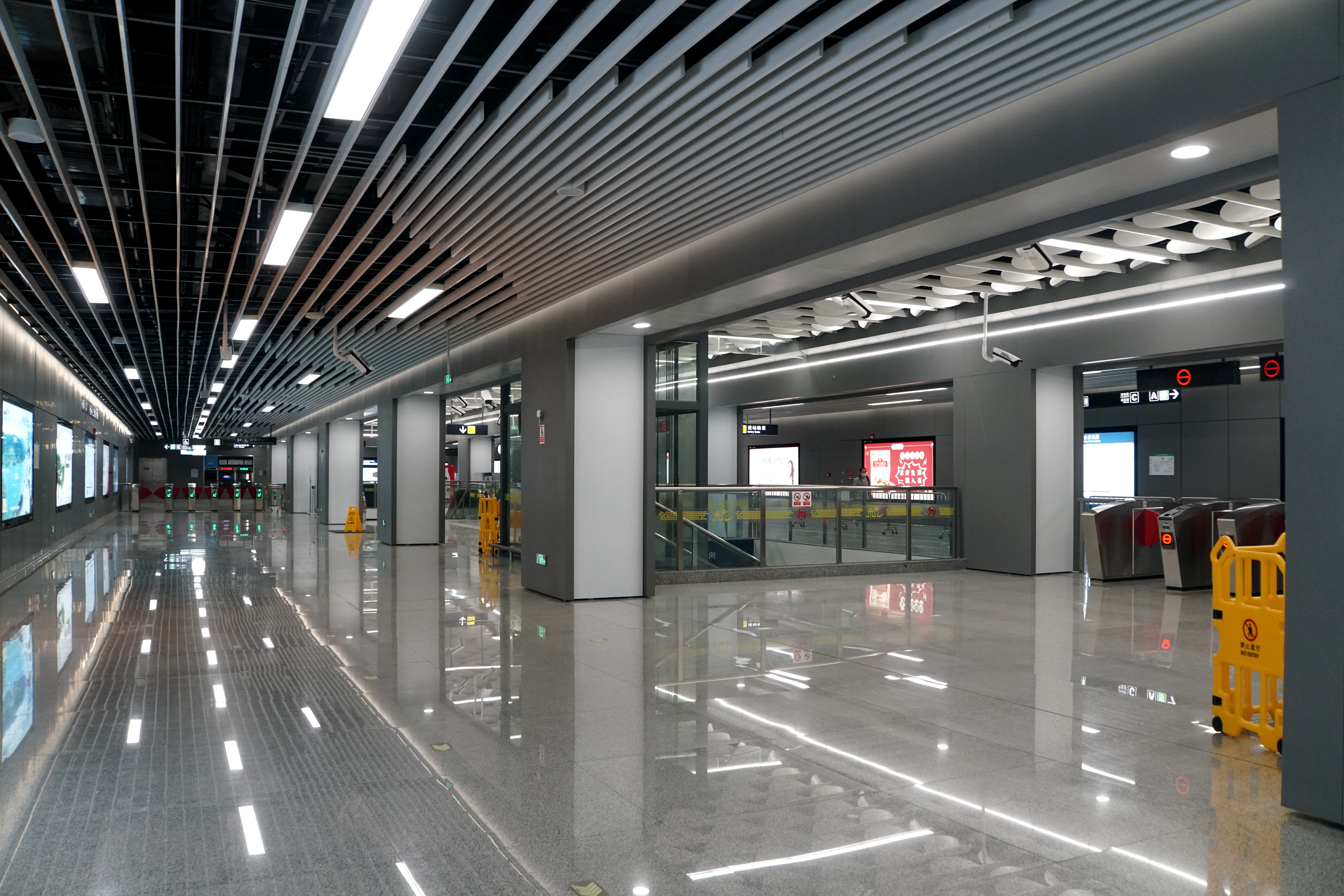
Concourse

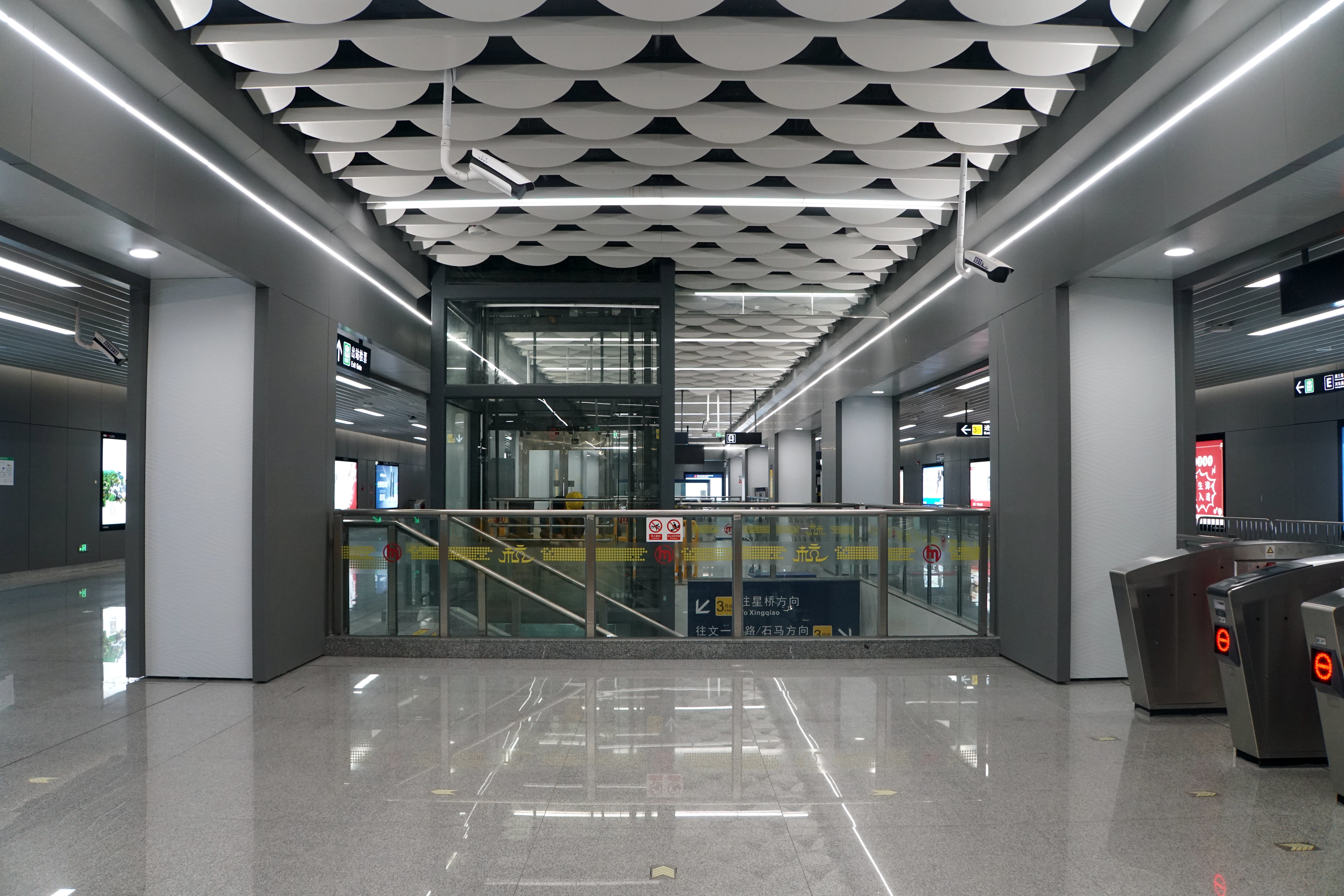
Concourse

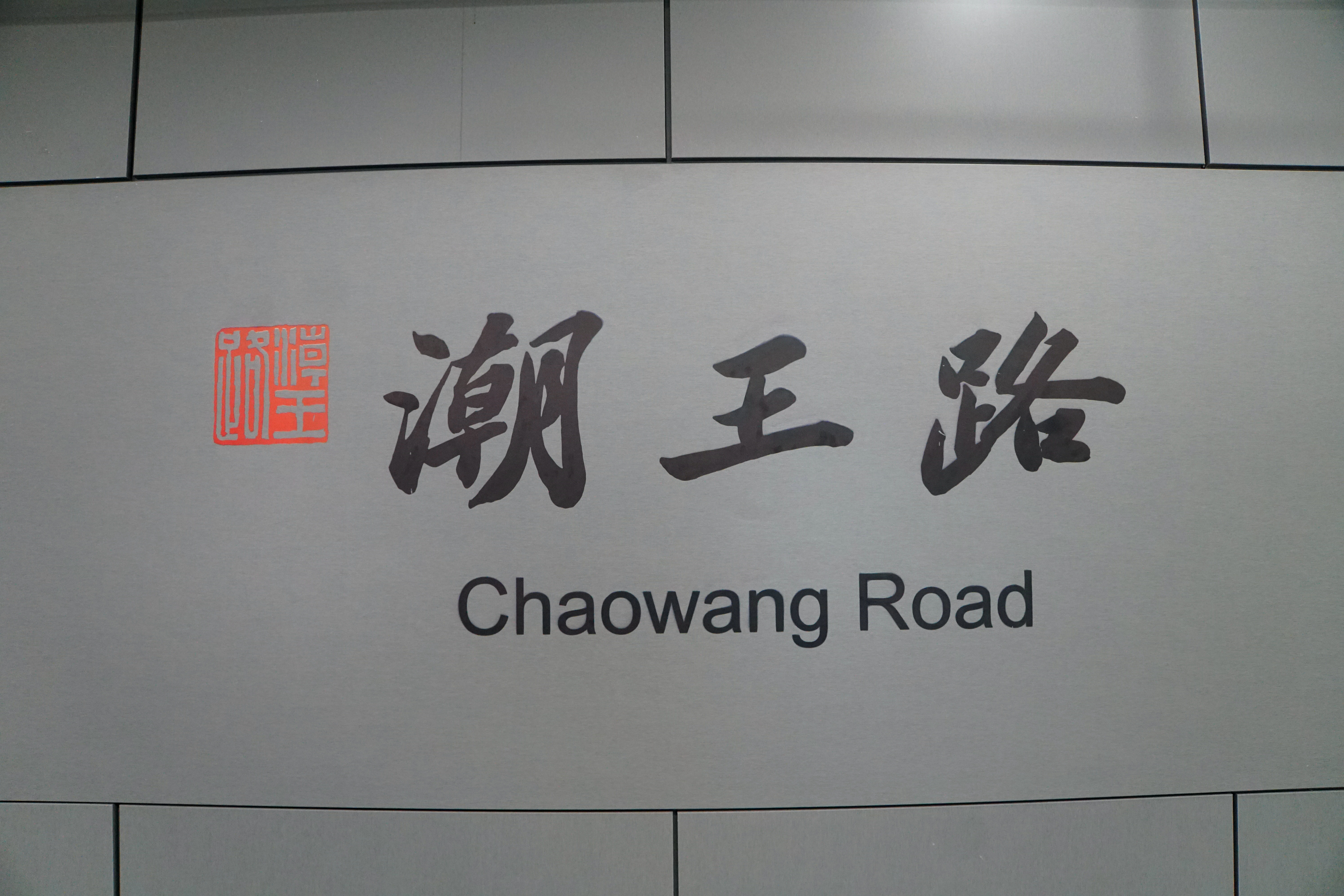
Station name in Chinese calligraphy

== Entrances/exits ==
- A: Huadian Alley
- B: Changban Alley
- C: west side of Hedong Road
- D1: west side of Hedong Road, north side of Chaowang Road
- D2: Zhaohui Community (Zone 7)
- E1: north side of Hedong Road, north side of Chaowang Road
- E2: Zhaohui Community (Zone 5)
