= West Wenyi Road station =

Metro station in Hangzhou, China

West Wenyi Road 文一西路
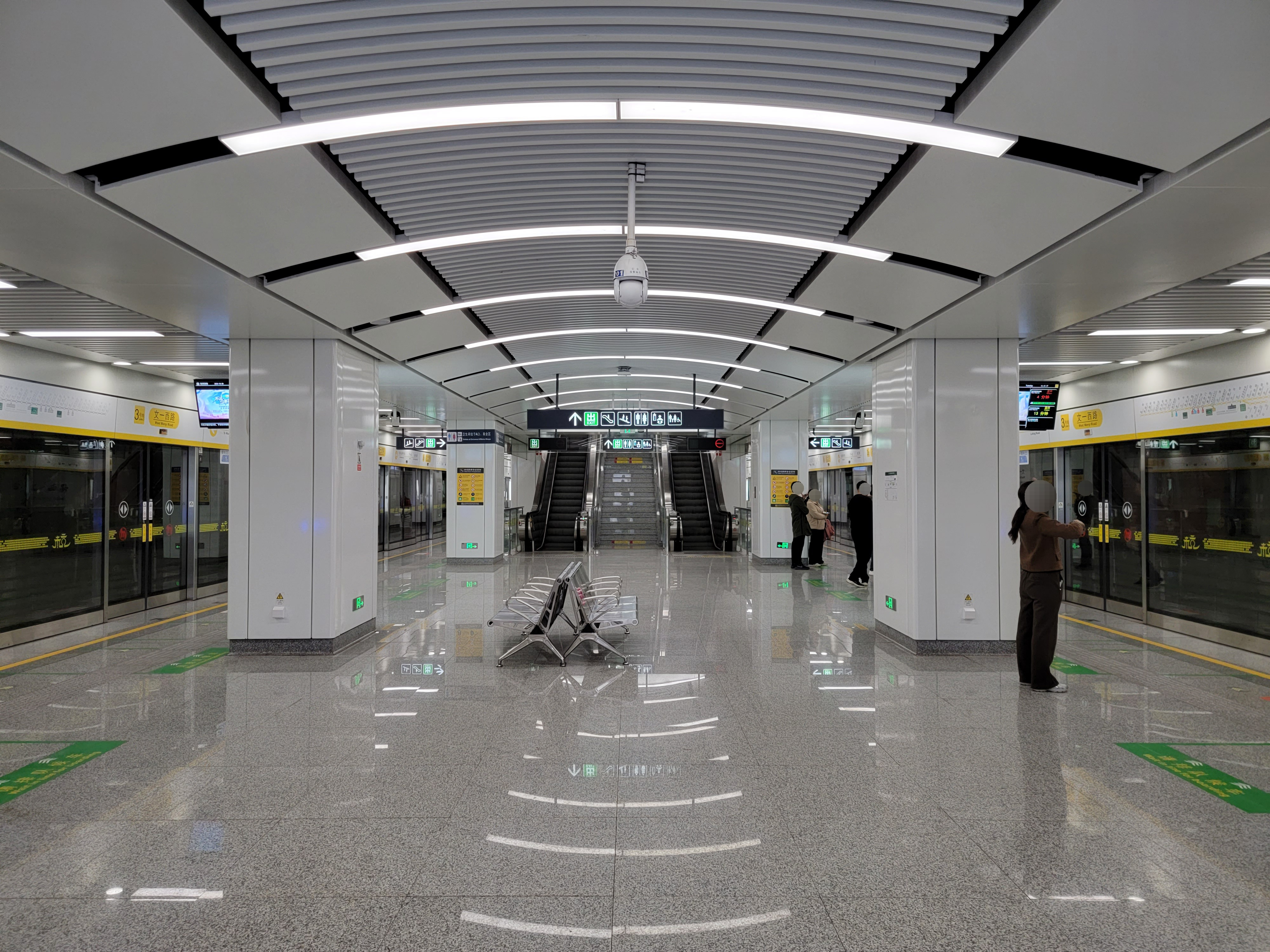
- Platforms

General information
- Location: Jingteng Road (景腾路) × Haichuang Street (海创街); Yuhang District, Hangzhou, Zhejiang; China
- Coordinates: 30°16′36″N 119°58′34″E
- System: Hangzhou Metro
- Operated by: Hangzhou Metro Corporation
- Line: Line 3
- Platforms: 2 (1 island platform)

Construction
- Structure type: Underground
- Accessible: Yes

History
- Opened: 10 June 2022

Services
Preceding station	Hangzhou Metro	Following station
North Longzhou Road towards Wushanqiancun	Line 3	Lvting Road towards Xingqiao
Route map
Location

West Wenyi Road (Chinese: 文一西路) is a metro station of Line 3 of the Hangzhou Metro in China. It is located in Yuhang District of Hangzhou. The station was opened on 10 June 2022.

== Structure ==
West Wenyi Road has two levels: a concourse, and an island platform with two tracks for line 3.

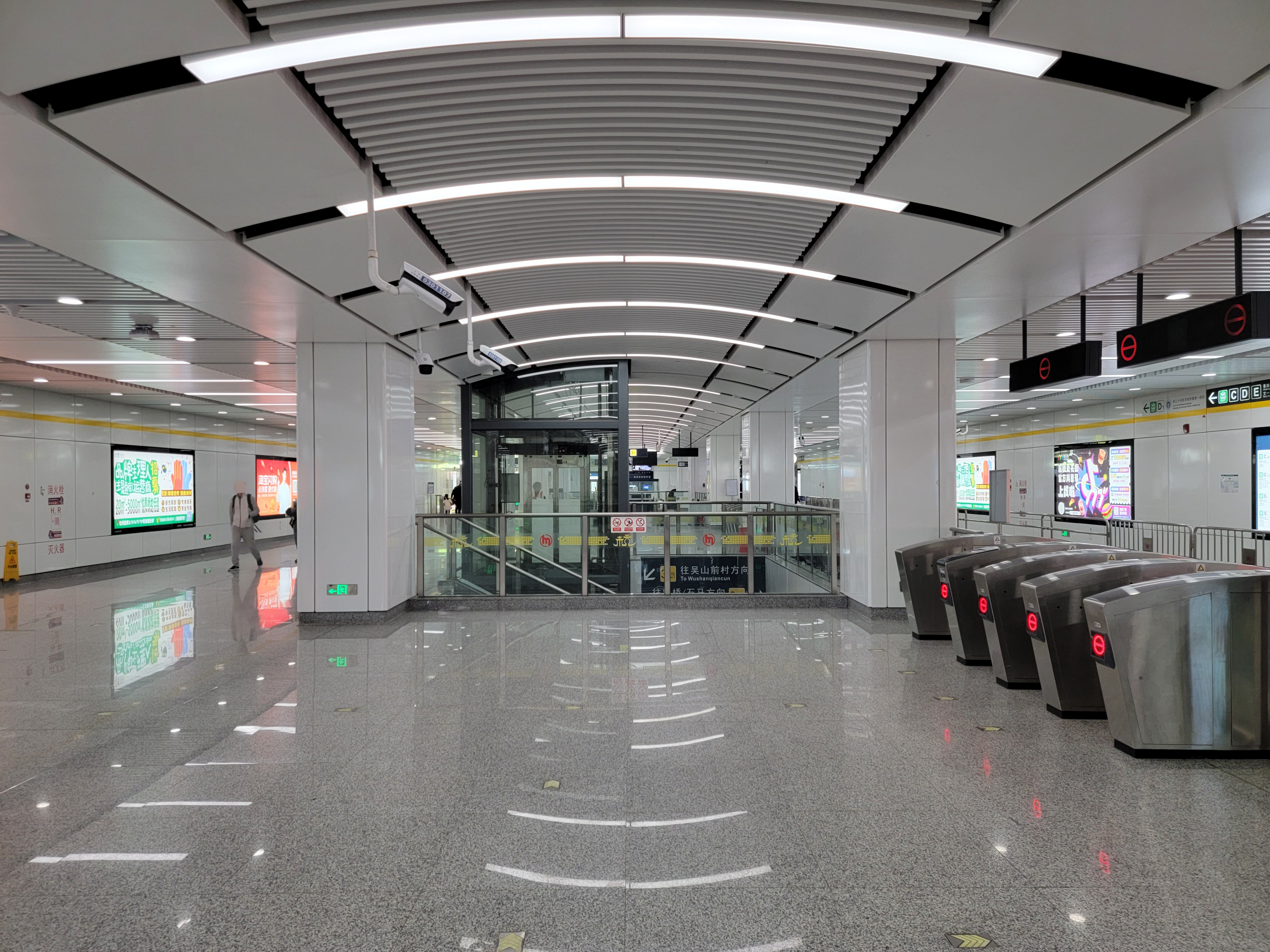
Concourse

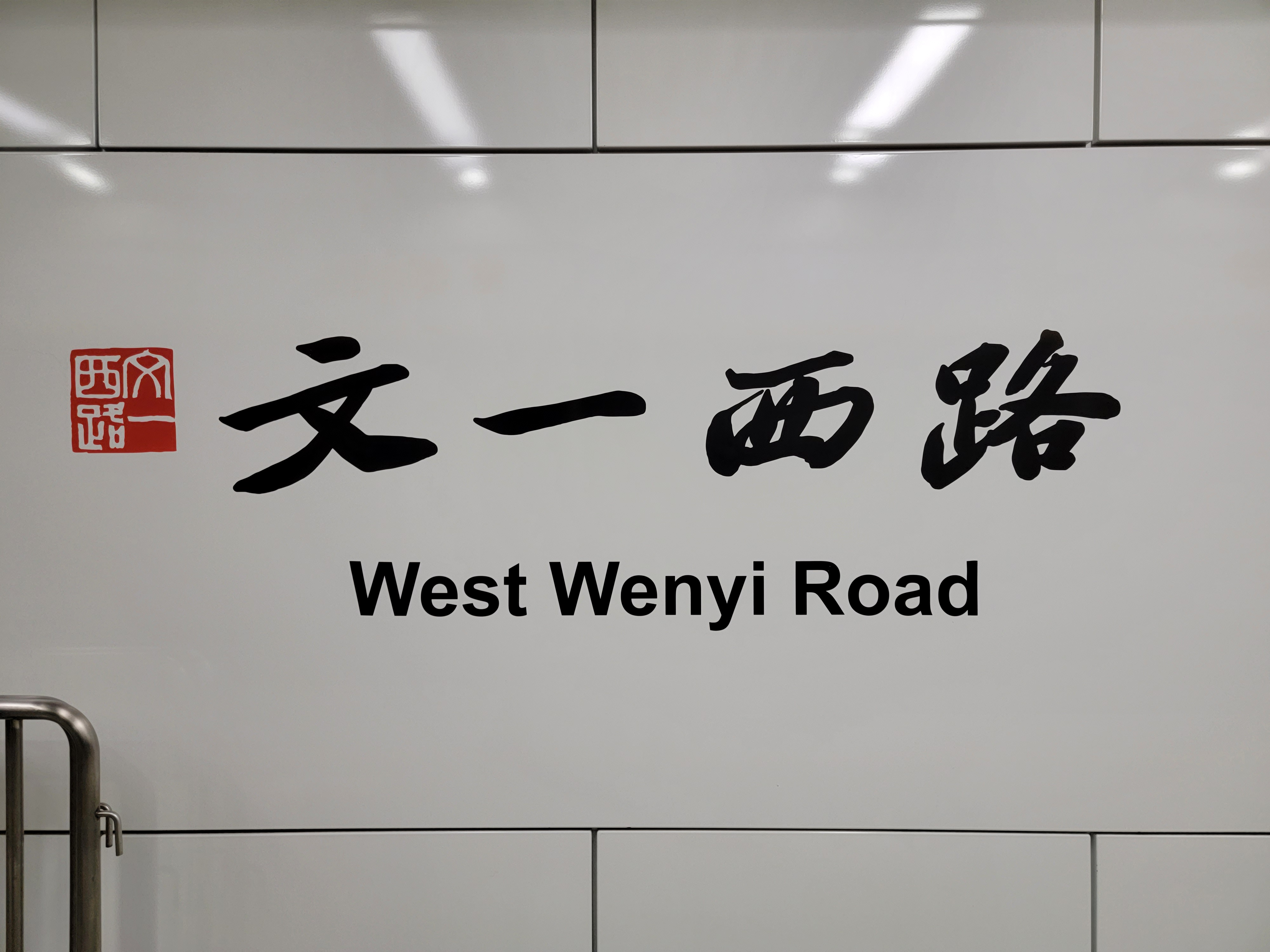
Station name in Chinese calligraphy

== Entrances/exits ==
- A: east side of Jingteng Road, Longtan Road
- B1: Longtan Road, Longyuan Road
- B2: Longtan Road
- B3: west side of Jingteng Road, Yuhangtang Road
- C: Yuhang District People's Government
- D1: south side of Wenyi Road (W), east side of Jinteng Road, Sikai Road, The First Affiliated Hospital, Zhejiang University School of Medicine
- D2: south side of Wenyi Road (W), west side of Jinteng Road
- E: Haichuang Street
