= Line 3 (Hangzhou Metro) =

Metro line of the Hangzhou Metro system in China

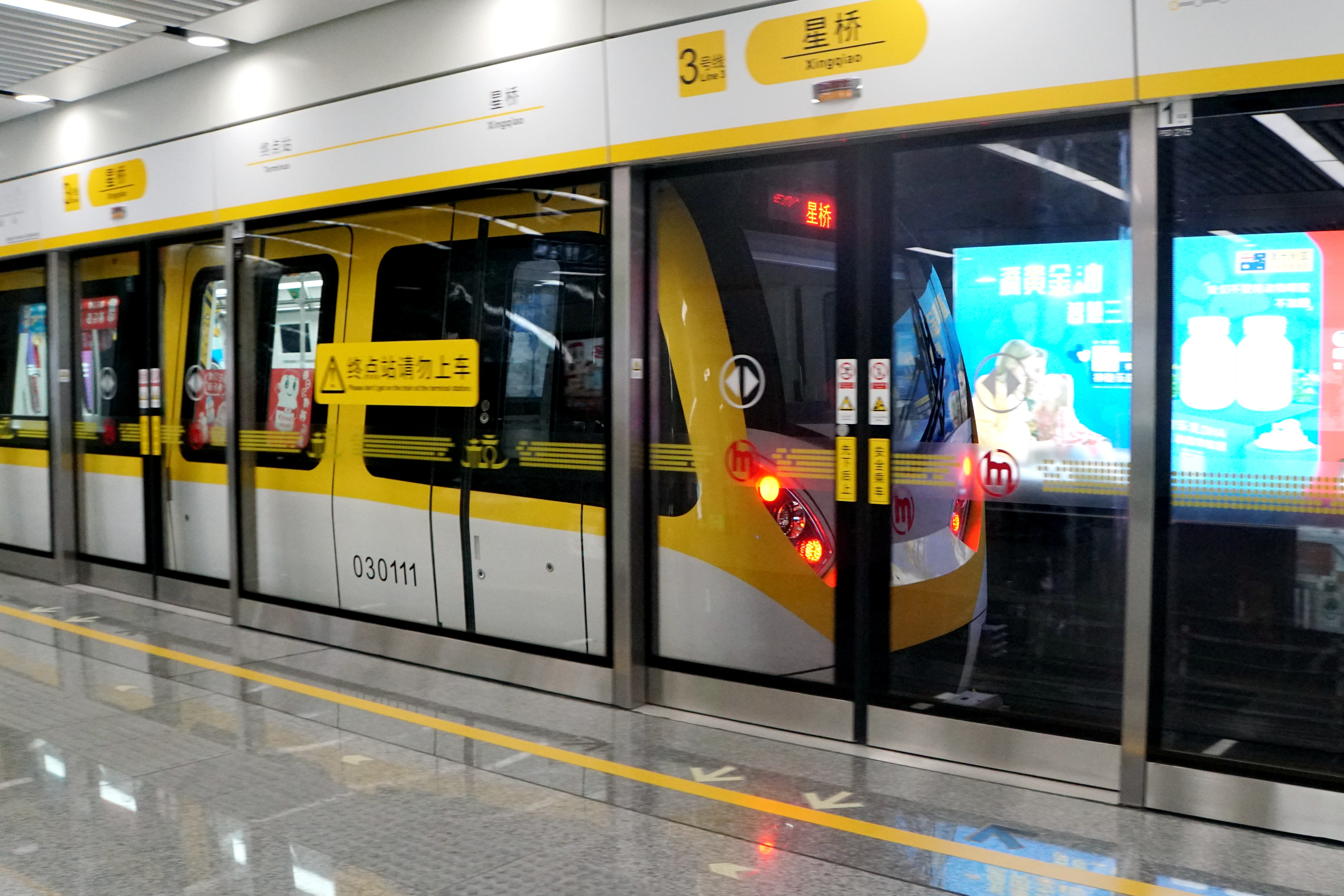

Overview
- Status: In operation
- Owner: City of Hangzhou
- Locale: Hangzhou, Zhejiang, China
- Termini: Xingqiao; Wushanqiancun / Shima
- Stations: 39 (including 2 unopened)

Service
- Type: Rapid transit
- System: Hangzhou Metro
- Services: 1
- Operator: Hangzhou Metro Corporation
- Depot(s): Xingqiao Depot; Xiaoheshan Stabling Yard; Cangqian Depot
- Rolling stock: PM178

History
- Opened: February 21, 2022; 4 years ago

Technical
- Line length: 57.5 km (35.73 mi)
- Number of tracks: 2
- Character: Underground
- Track gauge: 1,435 mm (4 ft 8 1/2 in)
- Electrification: Overhead, 1500 V DC
- Operating speed: 80 km/h (50 mph)

Line 3 of the Hangzhou Metro (simplified Chinese: 杭州地铁三号线; traditional Chinese: 杭州地鐵三號線; pinyin: Hángzhōu Dìtiě Sānhào Xiàn) is a metro line in Hangzhou. The line is 57.5 km long. It will run in a southwest-northeast direction between Wushanqiancun station in Yuhang District and Xingqiao station in Linping District in the east, passing through downtown Hangzhou and providing transfers with multiple other lines in the system. The line uses 6-car Class A_{H} rolling stock, which is designed for exclusive use in Hangzhou Metro. The line is colored yellow on maps.

== Opening timeline ==
The initial section of the line, from Xingqiao to Chaowang Road was opened to public on 21 February 2022, and the remaining section from Chaowang Road to West Wenyi Road and the branch from South Xixi Wetland to Shima was opened on 10 June 2022. The Northern extension from West Wenyi Road to Wushanqiancun was opened on 22 September 2022.

Segment	Commencement	Length	Station(s)	Name
Chaowang Road — Xingqiao	21 February 2022	21 km (13.05 mi)	13	Phase 1 initial section
West Wenyi Road — Chaowang Road	10 June 2022	22.41 km (13.92 mi)	16	Phase 1 remaining section
Shima — South Xixi Wetland	10 June 2022	7.8 km (4.85 mi)	4	Phase 1 remaining section
Wulinmen	20 July 2022	infill station	1	Phase 1 remaining section
Wushanqiancun — West Wenyi Road	22 September 2022	4.7 km (2.92 mi)	3	Phase 1 adjustment section

== Service routes ==
- Wushanqiancun — Xingqiao
- Shima — Xingqiao

== Stations ==
Legend

- Operational
- Under construction

Service routes		Station name		Connections	Distance km	Location	Opening Date
Service routes		English	Chinese	Connections	Distance km	Location	Opening Date
	●	Shima	石马		-	Xihu	10 June 2022
	●	Xiaoheshan	小和山	12	1.187	Xihu	10 June 2022
	●	Pingfeng	屏峰		2.071	Xihu	10 June 2022
	●	Liuxia	留下		2.752	Xihu	10 June 2022
●	｜	Wushanqiancun	吴山前村		0.00	Yuhang	22 September 2022
｜	｜	Tangjiacun	汤家村			Yuhang	Unopened
●	｜	West Railway Station	火车西站	12 19		Yuhang	22 September 2022
●	｜	North Longzhou Road	龙舟北路		1.333	Yuhang	22 September 2022
●	｜	West Wenyi Road	文一西路		1.760	Yuhang	10 June 2022
●	｜	Lvting Road	绿汀路	5 16	2.237	Yuhang	10 June 2022
｜	｜	Chuangming Road	创明路		1.098	Yuhang	Unopened
●	｜	Quanfeng	全丰		2.043	Yuhang	10 June 2022
●	｜	Gaojiao Road	高教路	12	1.419	Yuhang	10 June 2022
●	｜	Liansheng Road	联胜路		1.421	Yuhang	10 June 2022
●	｜	Hongyuan	洪园		1.645	Yuhang	10 June 2022
●	●	South Xixi Wetland	西溪湿地南		1.232 / 1.803	Xihu	10 June 2022
●	●	Huawu	花坞		1.655	Xihu	10 June 2022
●	●	Dongyue	东岳		1.316	Xihu	10 June 2022
●	●	Gudun Road	古墩路		1.199	Xihu	10 June 2022
●	●	Gudang Xincun	古荡新村			Xihu	10 June 2022
●	●	Gudang	古荡			Xihu	10 June 2022
●	●	Huanglong Sports Center	黄龙体育中心	10		Xihu	10 June 2022
●	●	Huanglong Cave	黄龙洞			Xihu	10 June 2022
●	●	Wulinmen	武林门	2	1.417	Xihu	20 July 2022
●	●	Wulin Square	武林广场	1	1.141	Gongshu	10 June 2022
●	●	West Lake Cultural Square	西湖文化广场	1 19	0.842	Gongshu	10 June 2022
●	●	Chaowang Road	潮王路		1.258	Gongshu	21 February 2022
●	●	Xiangji Temple	香积寺		1.608	Gongshu	21 February 2022
●	●	Daguan	大关		1.039	Gongshu	21 February 2022
●	●	Shanxian	善贤	5	1.500	Gongshu	21 February 2022
●	●	Xintiandi Street	新天地街	4	2.023	Gongshu	21 February 2022
●	●	Qilun Square	汽轮广场		2.044	Gongshu	21 February 2022
●	●	Huafeng Road	华丰路		1.697	Gongshu	21 February 2022
●	●	Tongxie Road	同协路		1.220	Shangcheng	21 February 2022
●	●	Taohuahu Park	桃花湖公园		1.366	Shangcheng	21 February 2022
●	●	Dingqiao	丁桥		1.289	Shangcheng	21 February 2022
●	●	Huahe Street	华鹤街		2.113	Shangcheng	21 February 2022
●	●	Huangheshan	黄鹤山		1.315	Linping	21 February 2022
●	●	Xingqiao	星桥		1.840	Linping	21 February 2022

=== East extension ===
Station name		Connections	Distance km	Location
English	Chinese	Connections	Distance km	Location
Shiji Avenue	世纪大道	18	3.282	Linping
Linping	临平	9	1.366	Linping
Renmin Avenue	人民大道		1.118	Linping
Shijiadai Road	史家埭路		0.888	Linping
Xingguang Street	星光街		0.783	Linping

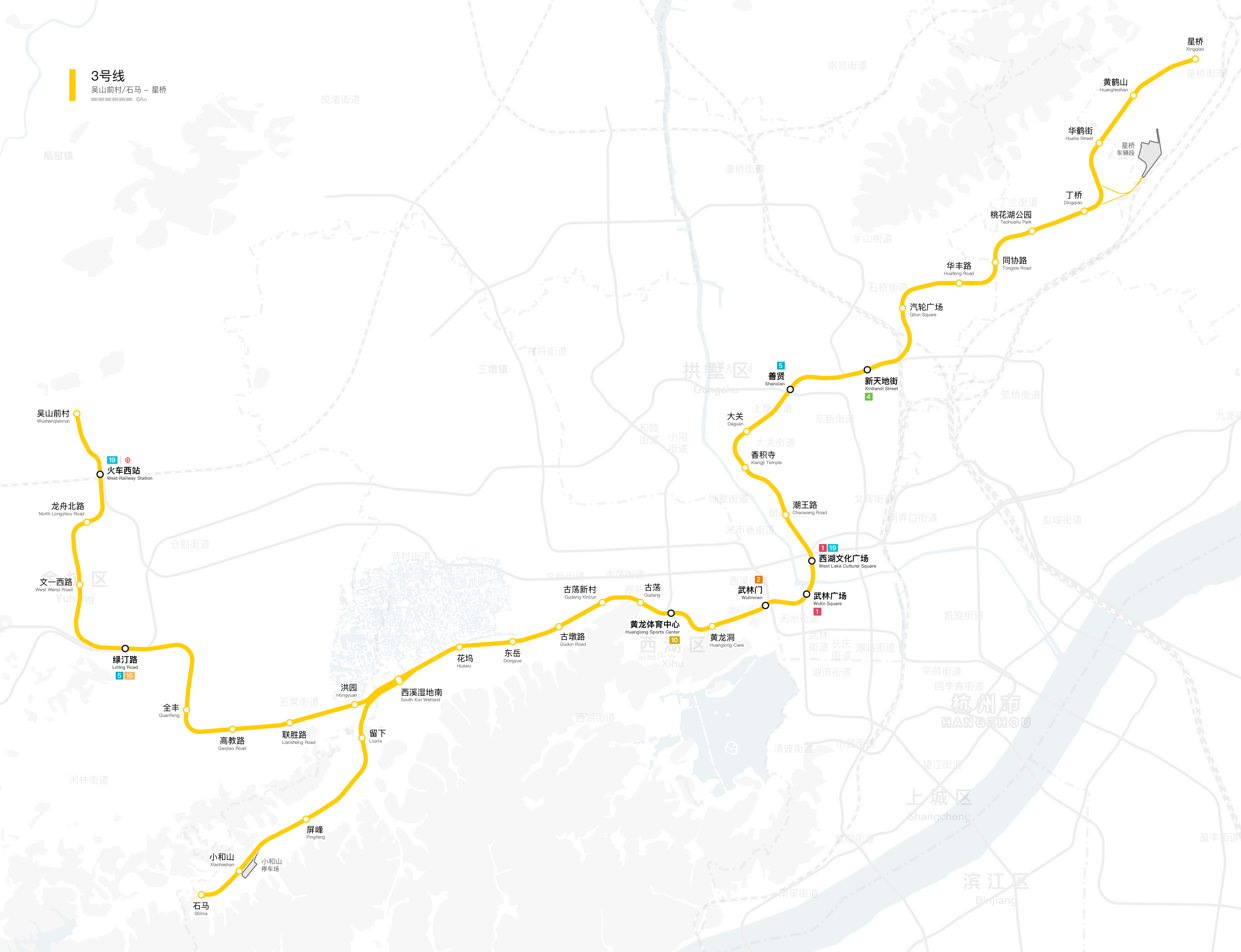
To scale map of Hangzhou Metro Line 3

== Rolling stock ==
Stock	Class	Year built	Builder	Number built	Numbers	Formation	Depots	Line assigned	Notes
PM179	A_{H}	2020-2022	CRRC Nanjing Puzhen	468 (78 sets); 858 (143 sets), exercise option	03 001 - 03 078 (030011-030786)	Tc+Mp+M+M+Mp+Tc	Xingqiao Yard; Xiaoheshan Yard; Cangqian Yard	3	

== See also ==
- Hangzhou Metro
