= Wushanqiancun station =

Metro station in Hangzhou, China

Wushanqiancun 吴山前村
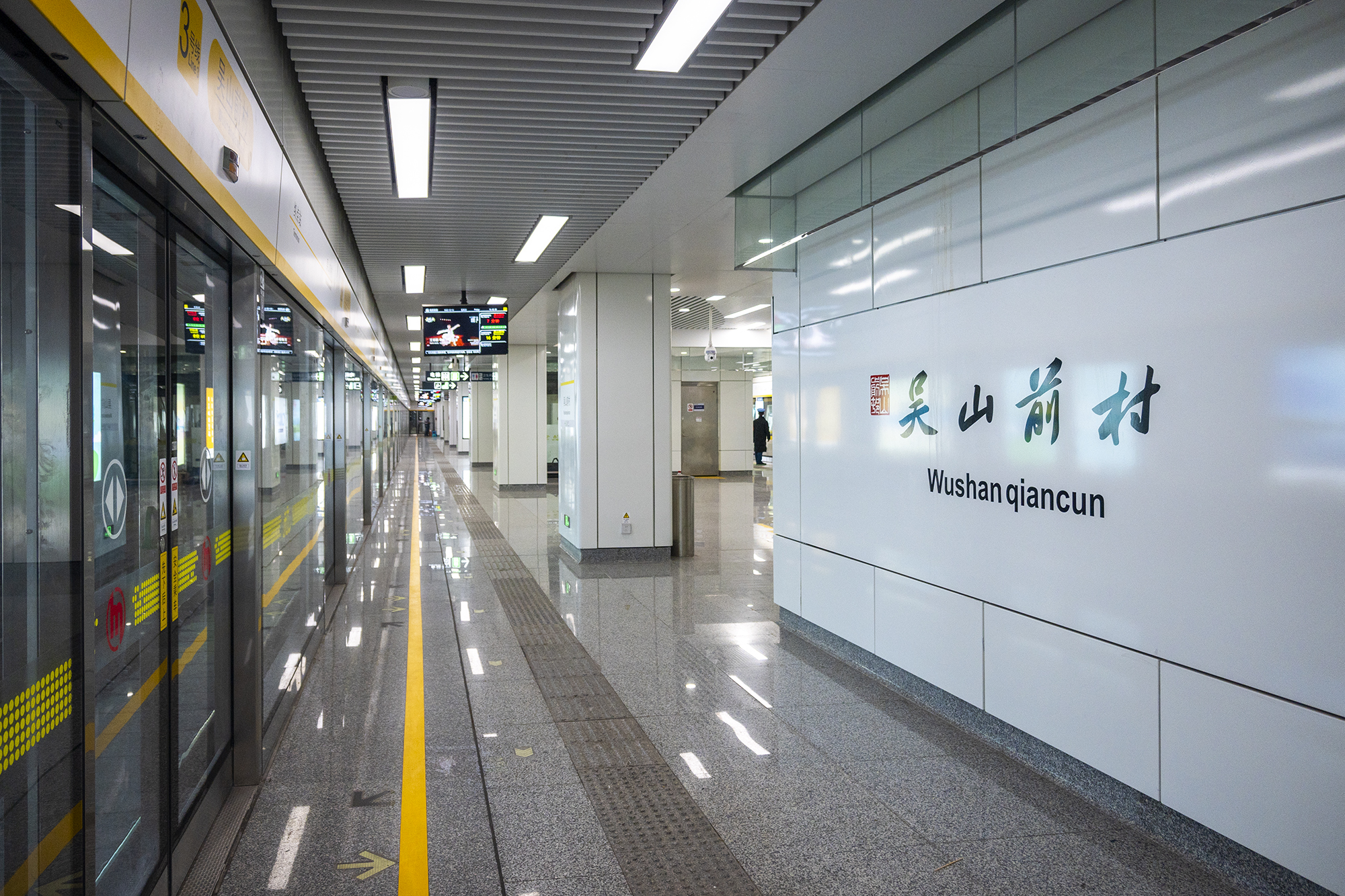
- Platform

General information
- Location: Liangshang Line (良上线); Yuhang District, Hangzhou, Zhejiang; China
- Coordinates: 30°18′49″N 119°58′32″E
- System: Hangzhou Metro
- Operated by: Hangzhou Metro Corporation
- Line: Line 3
- Platforms: 2 (1 island platform)

Construction
- Structure type: Underground
- Accessible: Yes

History
- Opened: 22 September 2022

Services
Preceding station	Hangzhou Metro	Following station
Terminus	Line 3	Tangjiacun towards Xingqiao
Location

Wushanqiancun (simplified Chinese: 吴山前村; traditional Chinese: 吳山前村) is a metro station of Line 3 of the Hangzhou Metro in China. It is located in Yuhang District of Hangzhou. It is the western terminus of Line 3 main line.

== Structure ==
Wushanqiancun has two levels: a concourse, and an island platform with two tracks for line 3.

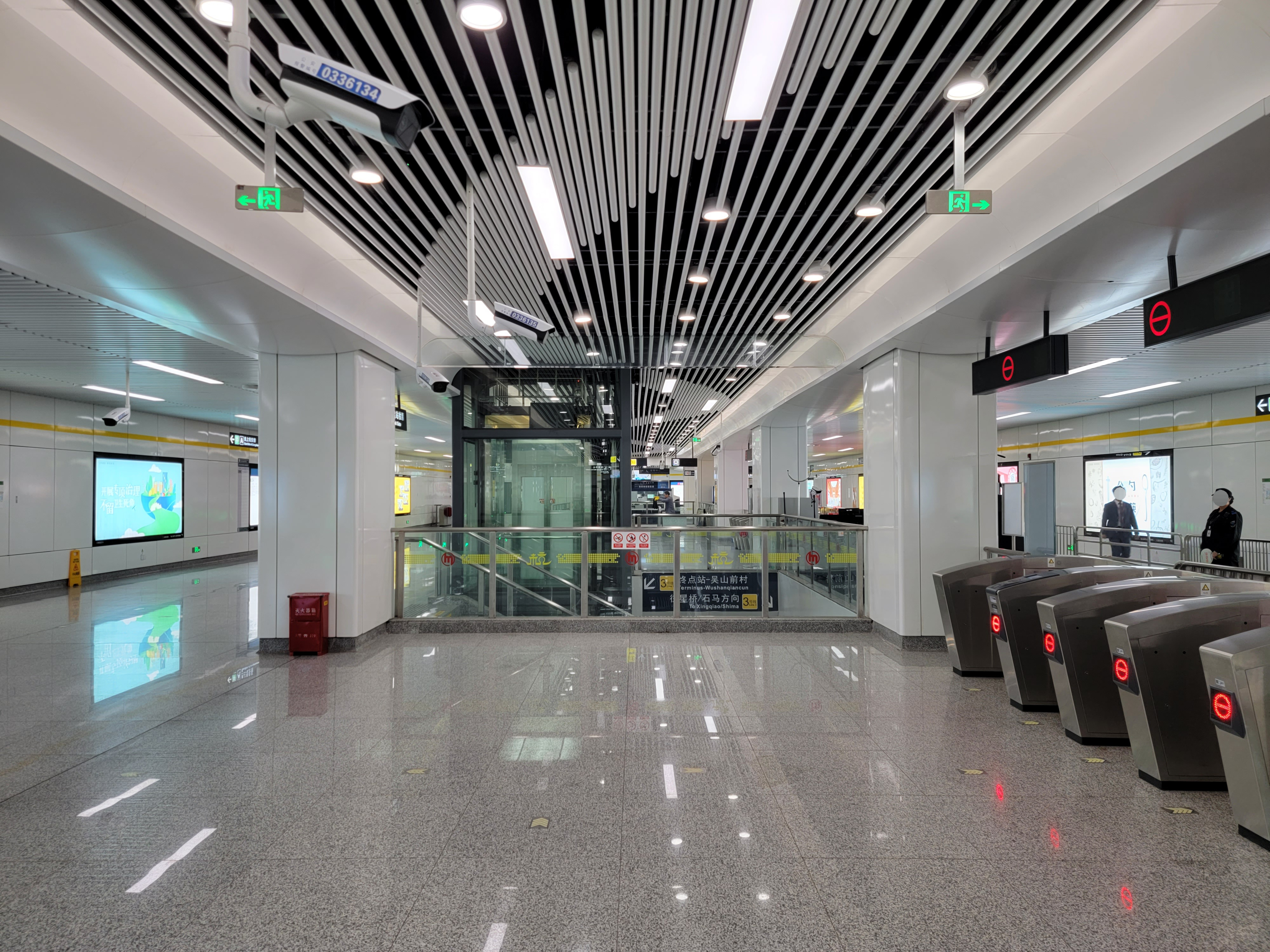
Concourse

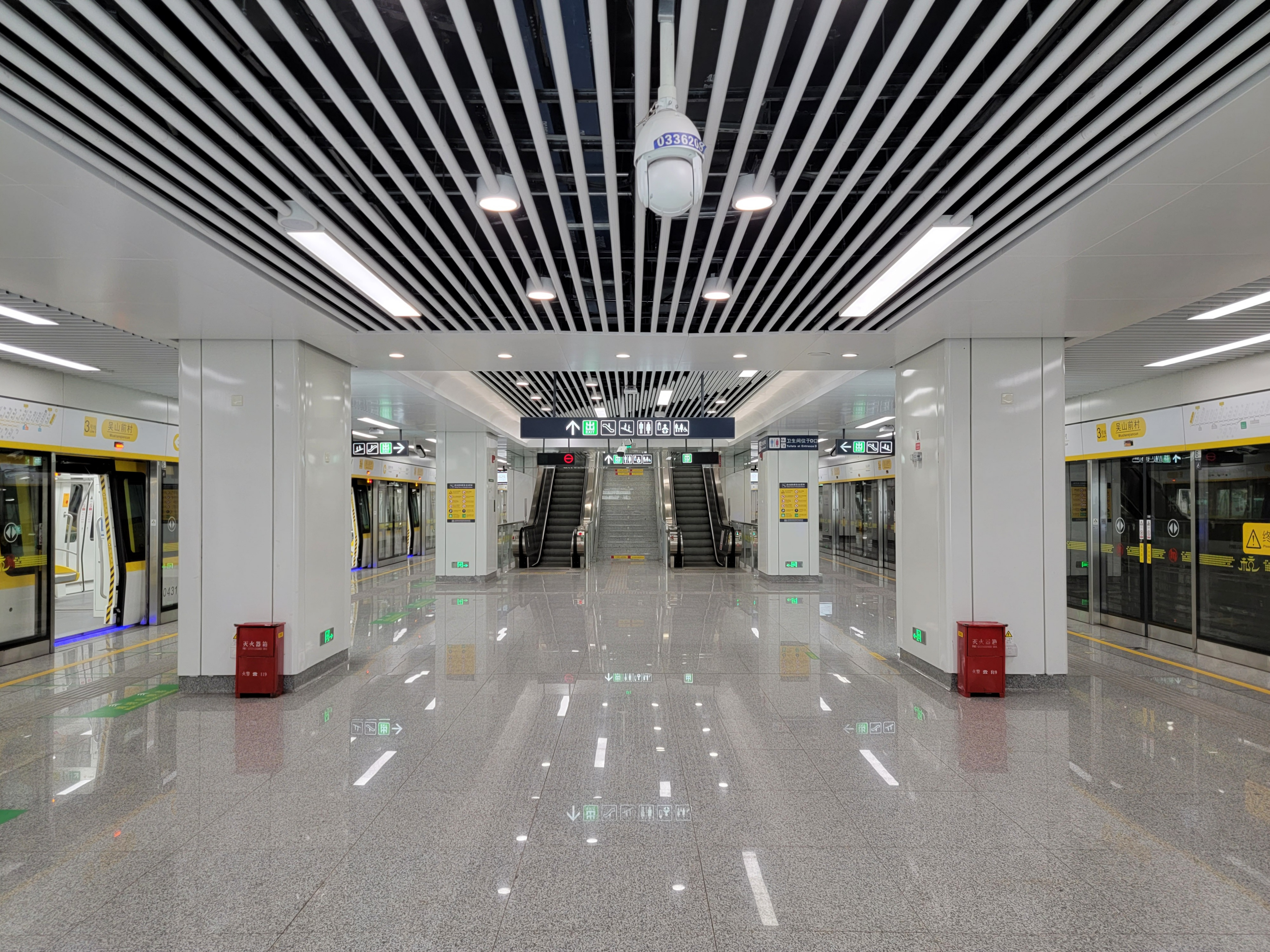
Platform

=== Entrances/exits ===
- A: east side of Liangshangxian, Wuzhuanxian
- C: west side of Liangshangxian
- D: east side of Liangshangxian, Wulingxian
