= Xingqiao station =

Metro station in Hangzhou, China

Xingqiao 星桥
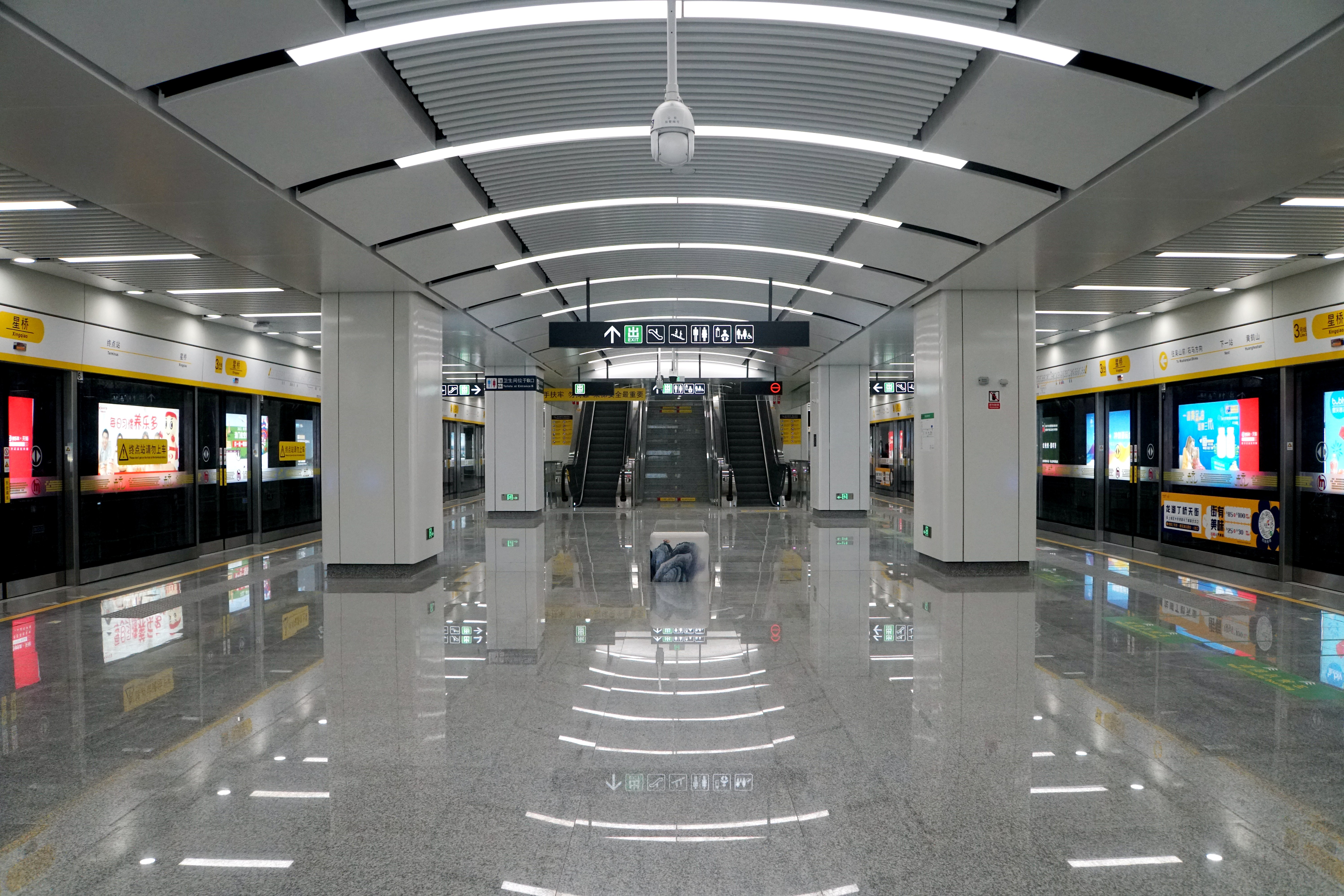
- Platforms

General information
- Location: Tiandu Road × Xingqiao Road (S); Xingqiao Subdistrict, Linping District, Hangzhou, Zhejiang; China
- Coordinates: 30.391371°N 120.257818°E
- System: Hangzhou metro station
- Operator: Hangzhou Metro Corporation
- Line: Line 3
- Platforms: 2 (1 island platform)

Construction
- Structure type: Underground
- Accessible: Yes

History
- Opened: 21 February 2022

Services
Preceding station	Hangzhou Metro	Following station
Huangheshan towards Wushanqiancun or Shima	Line 3	Terminus
Location

Xingqiao (simplified Chinese: 星桥; traditional Chinese: 星橋) is the eastern terminus of Line 3 of the Hangzhou Metro in China. It is located in the Xingqiao Subdistrict, Linping District, Hangzhou. The station was opened on 21 February 2022.

== Station layout ==
Xingqiao has two levels: a concourse, and an island platform with two tracks for line 3.

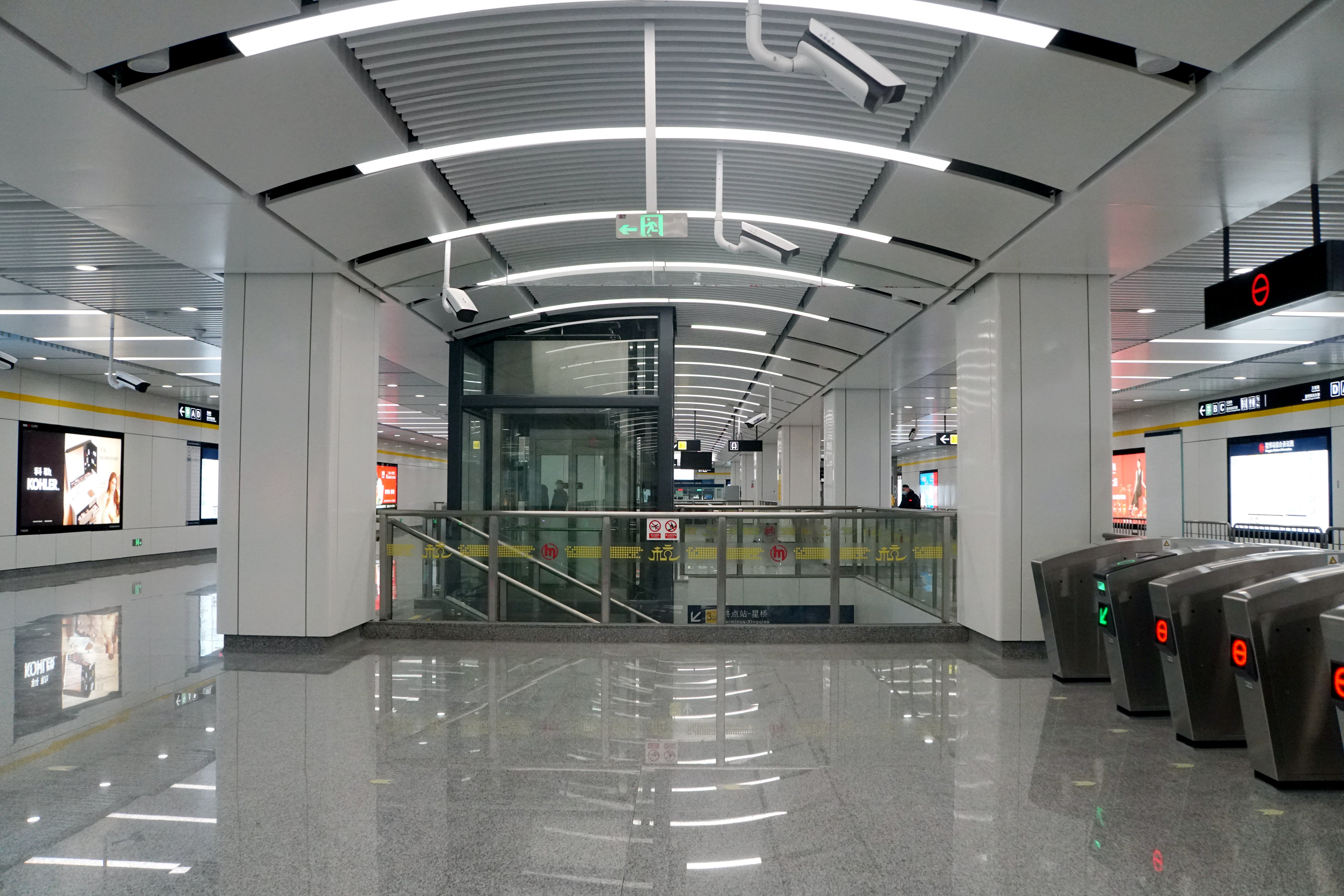
Concourse

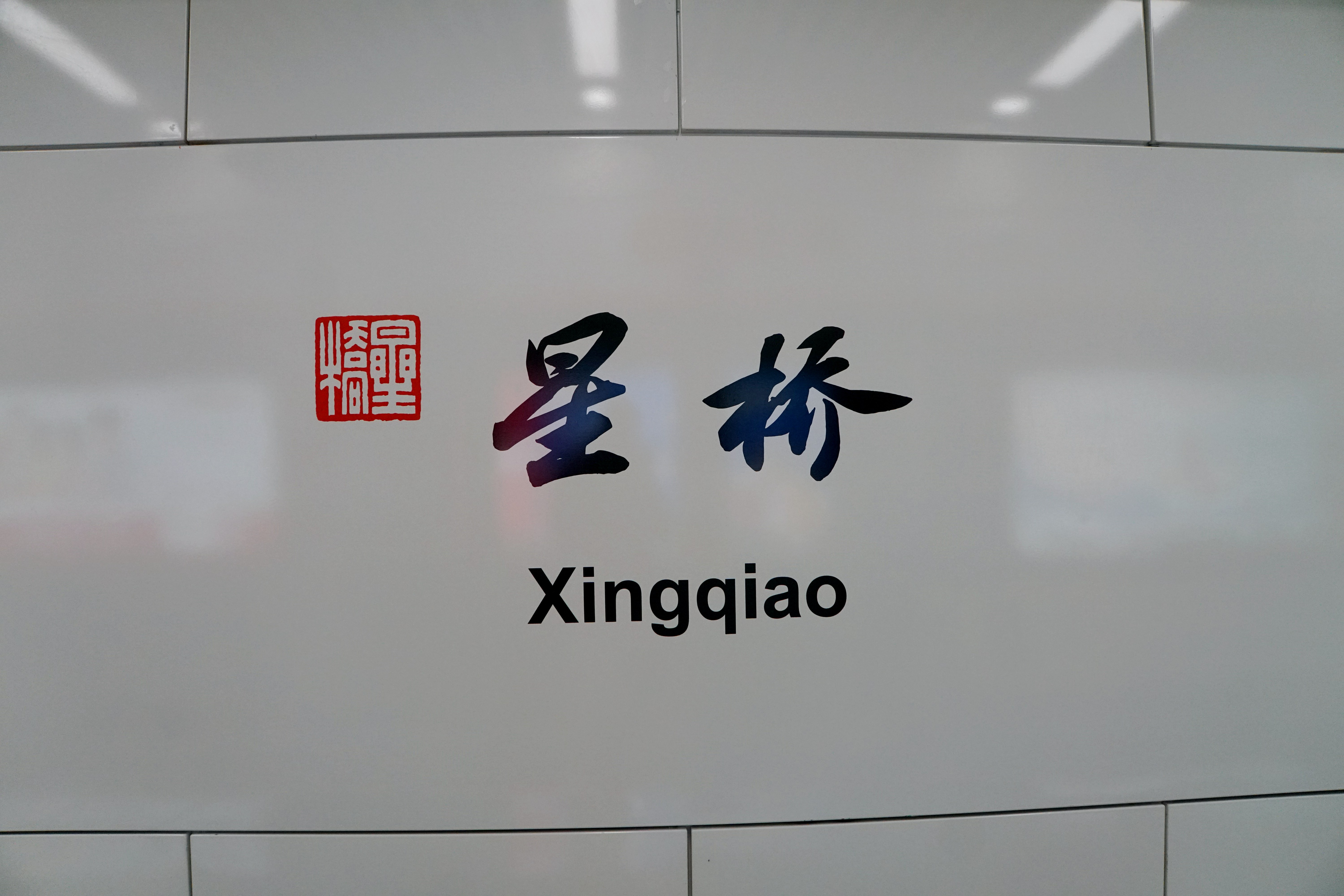
Station name in Chinese calligraphy

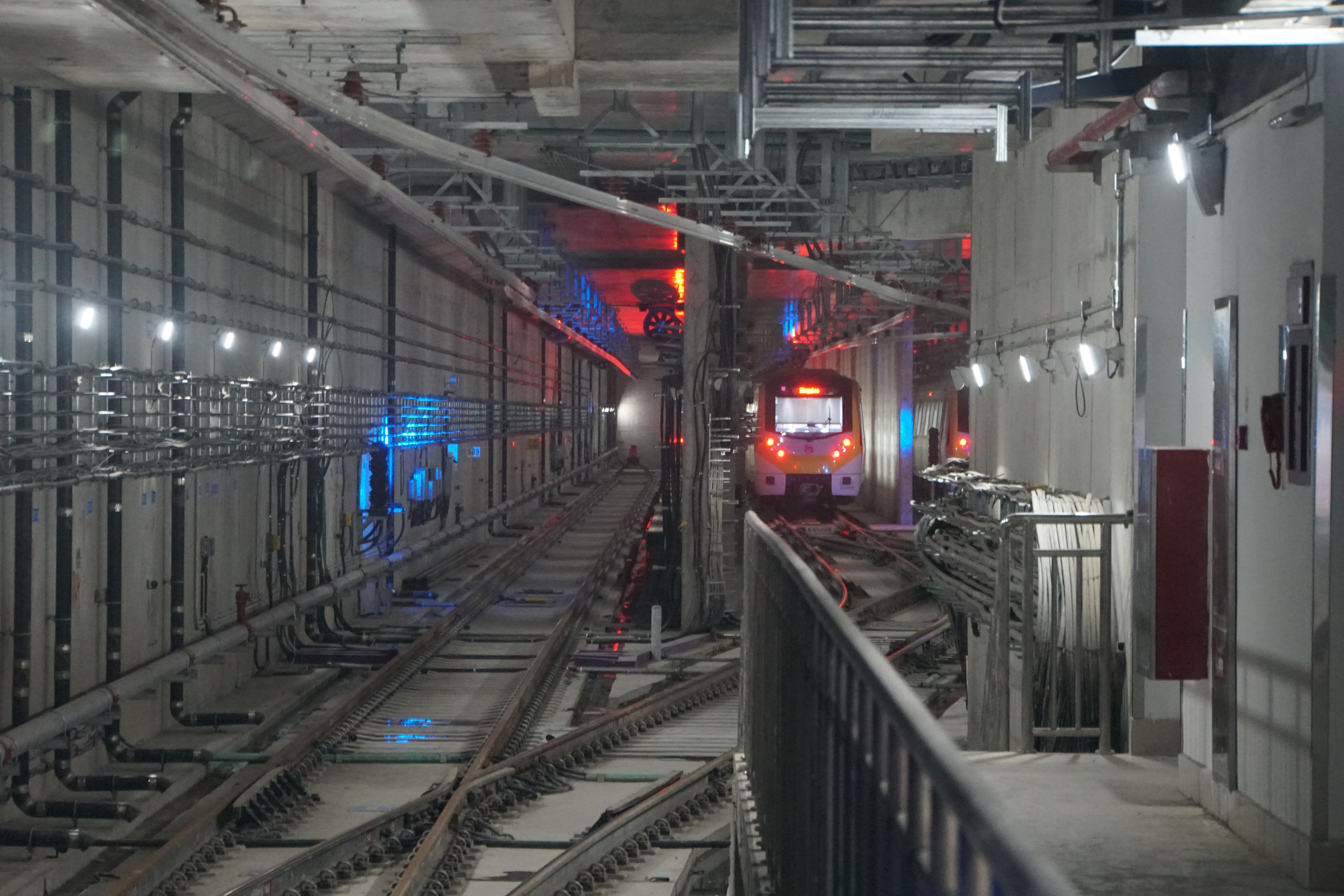
Pocket tracks

== Entrances/exits ==
- A: Glory City
- B: Splendid Mansion
- C: Qicaixing Business Center
- D: east side of Xingqiao Road (S), south side of Tiandu Road
