= Dongyue station =

Metro station in Hangzhou, China

Dongyue 东岳
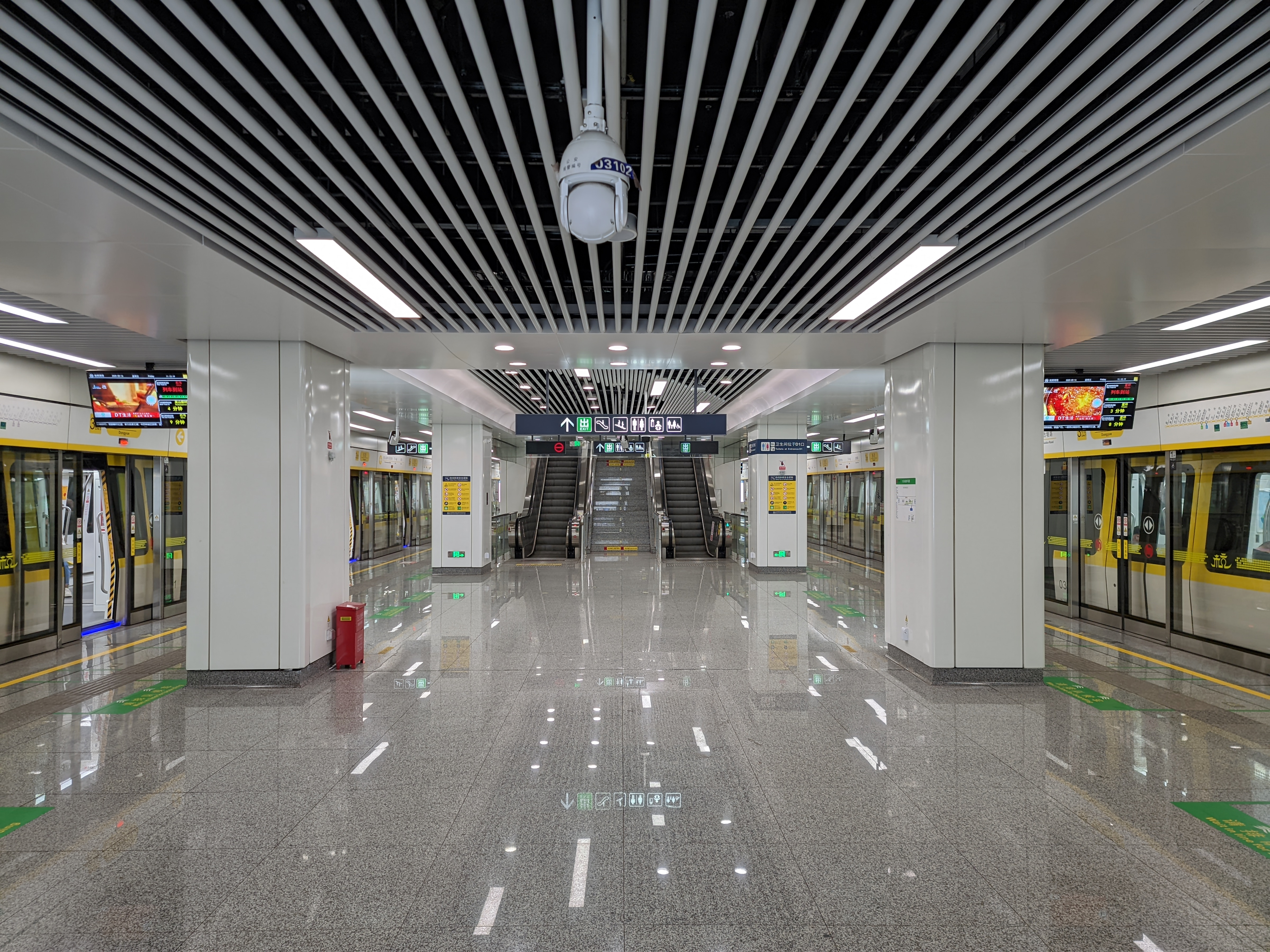
- Platforms

General information
- Location: Tianmushan Road × Zijingang Road; Xihu District, Hangzhou, Zhejiang; China
- Coordinates: 30.2645°N 120.08506°E
- System: Hangzhou metro station
- Operator: Hangzhou Metro Corporation
- Line: Line 3
- Platforms: 2 (1 island platform)
- Connections: Hangzhou West

Construction
- Structure type: Underground
- Accessible: Yes

History
- Opened: 10 June 2022

Services
Preceding station	Hangzhou Metro	Following station
Huawu towards Wushanqiancun or Shima	Line 3	Gudun Road towards Xingqiao
Route map
Location

Dongyue (simplified Chinese: 东岳; traditional Chinese: 東嶽) is a metro station of Line 3 of the Hangzhou Metro in China. It is located in Xihu District of Hangzhou. The station was opened on 10 June 2022.

== Station layout ==
Dongyue has two levels: a concourse, and an island platform with two tracks for line 3.

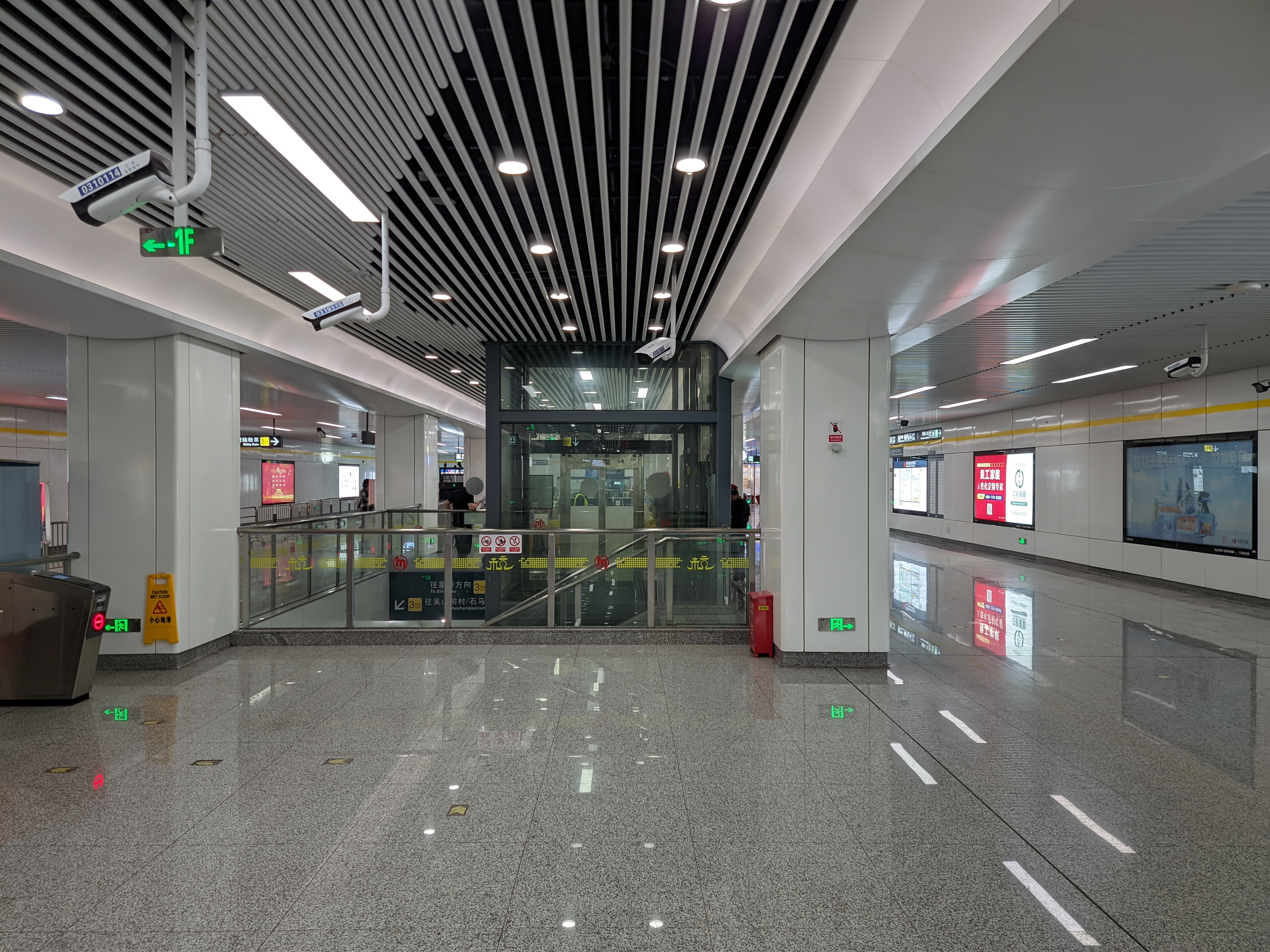
Concourse

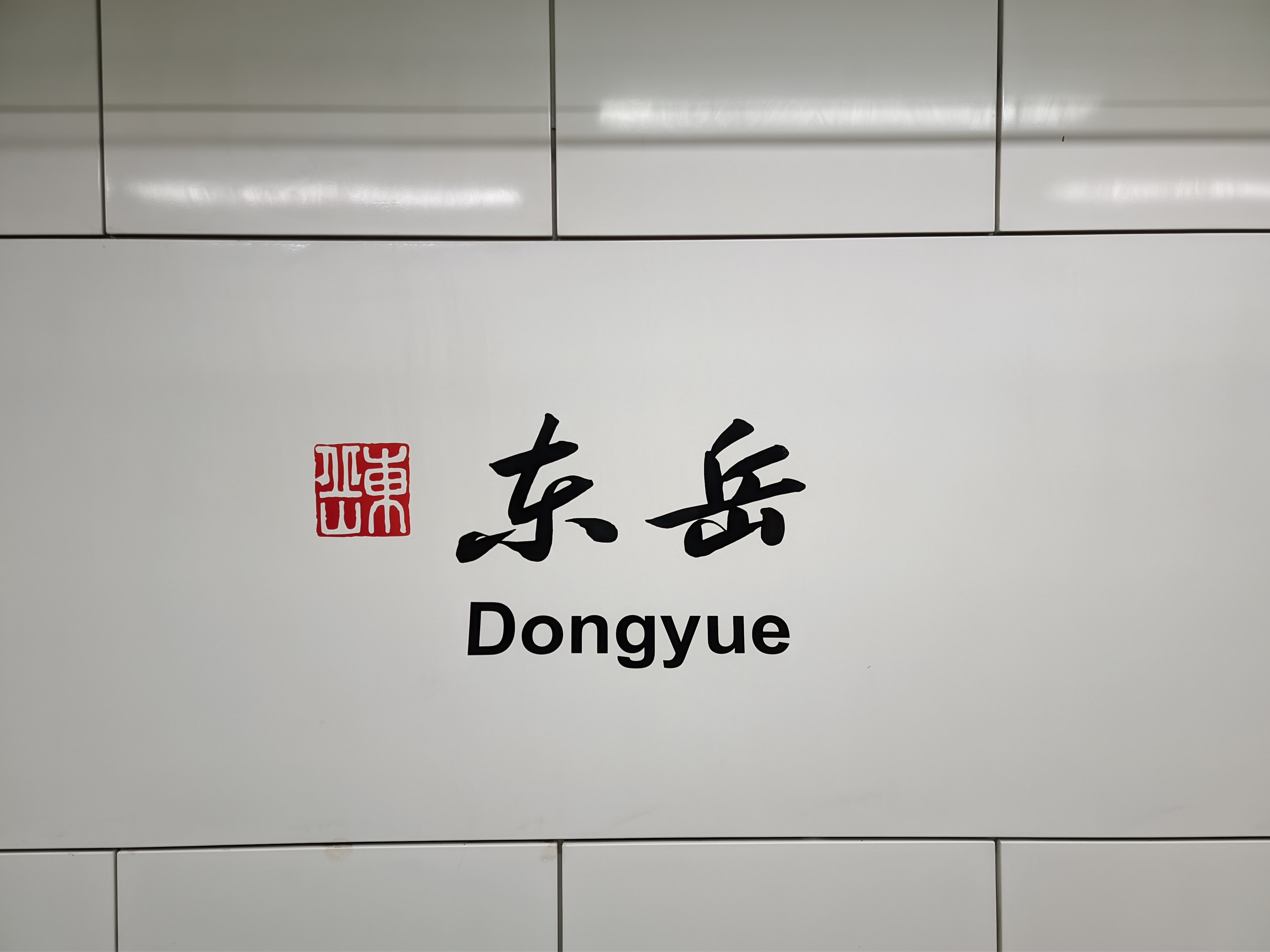
Station name in Chinese calligraphy

== Entrances/exits ==
- A: West Brook Entrance/exit of Xixi National Wetland Park
- B: north side of Tianmushan Road
- C: Hangzhou Chengxi Leisure Park
- D1: Hangzhou West coach station
- D2: south side of Tianmushan Road, east side of Zijingang Road
- D3: Fuyuan Xincun Community
