= Huawu station =

Metro station in Hangzhou, China

Huawu 花坞
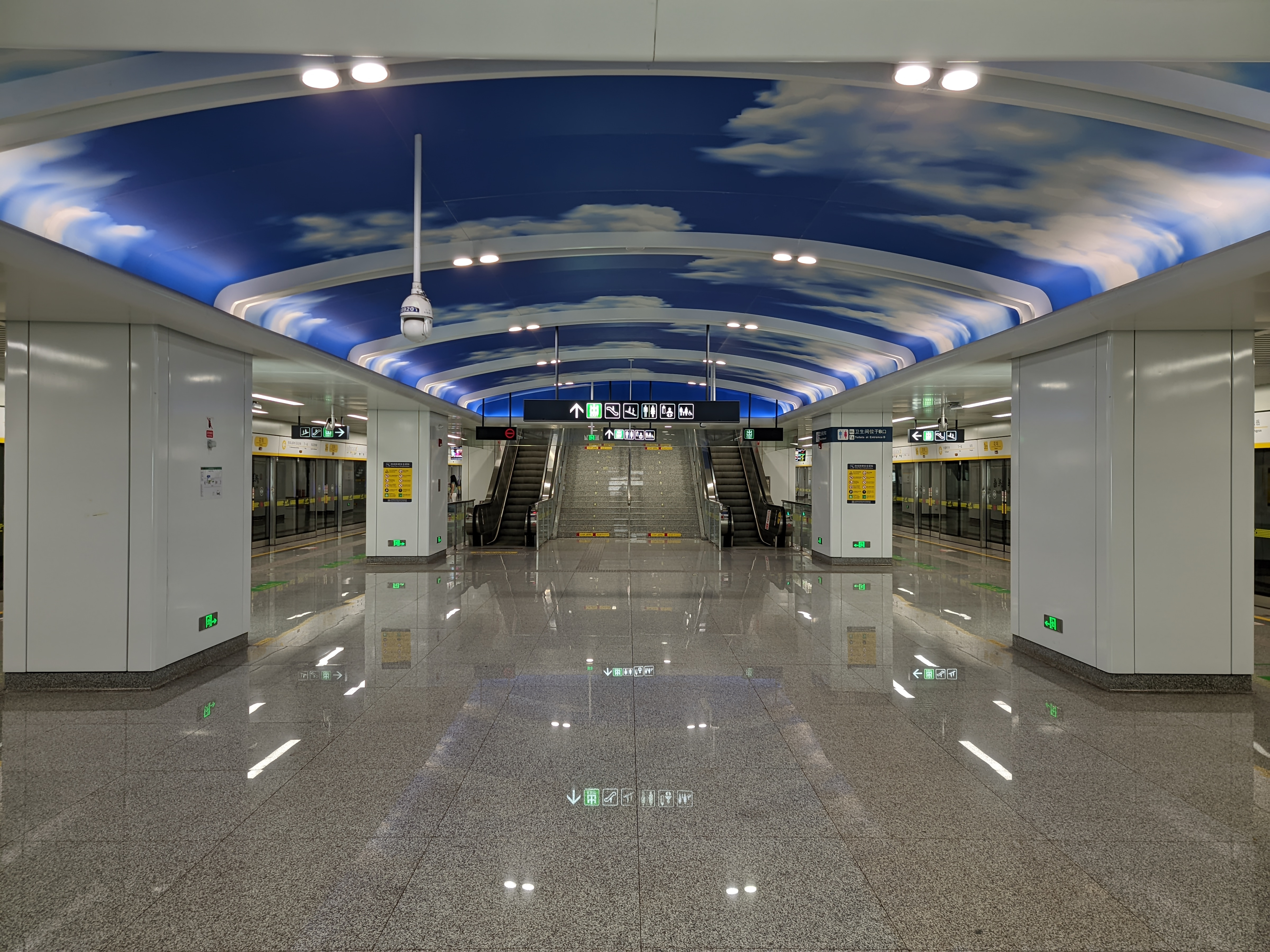
- Platforms

General information
- Location: Tianmushan Road × Huajiang Road; Xihu District, Hangzhou, Zhejiang; China
- Coordinates: 30.26315°N 120.07198°E
- System: Hangzhou metro station
- Operator: Hangzhou Metro Corporation
- Line: Line 3
- Platforms: 2 (1 island platform)

Construction
- Structure type: Underground
- Accessible: Yes

History
- Opened: 10 June 2022

Services
Preceding station	Hangzhou Metro	Following station
South Xixi Wetland towards Wushanqiancun or Shima	Line 3	Dongyue towards Xingqiao
Location

Huawu (simplified Chinese: 花坞; traditional Chinese: 花塢) is a metro station of Line 3 of the Hangzhou Metro in China. It is located in Xihu District of Hangzhou. The station was opened on 10 June 2022.

== Station layout ==
Huawu has two levels: a concourse, and an island platform with two tracks for line 3.

== Design ==
Huawu Station is themed around "Colorful Romance" (Chinese: “多彩浪漫”), featuring a free-form, streamlined grid that radiates a brilliant array of multicolored lighting effects. The illuminated strips balance aesthetic beauty with uniform brightness, while the organic, curved contours highlight the romantic and free-spirited nature of Huawu. The arched ceiling echoes the station's picturesque surroundings.

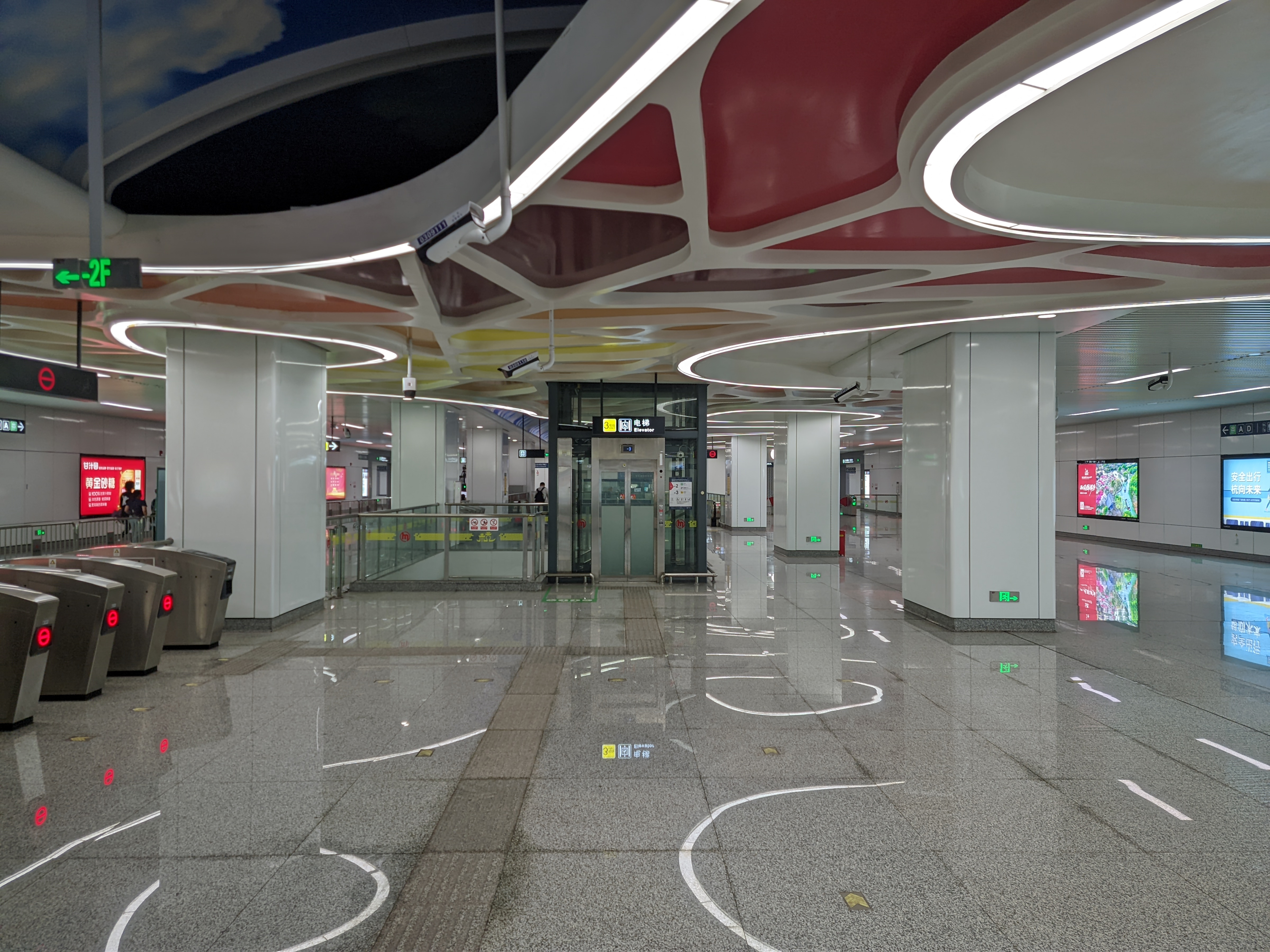
Concourse

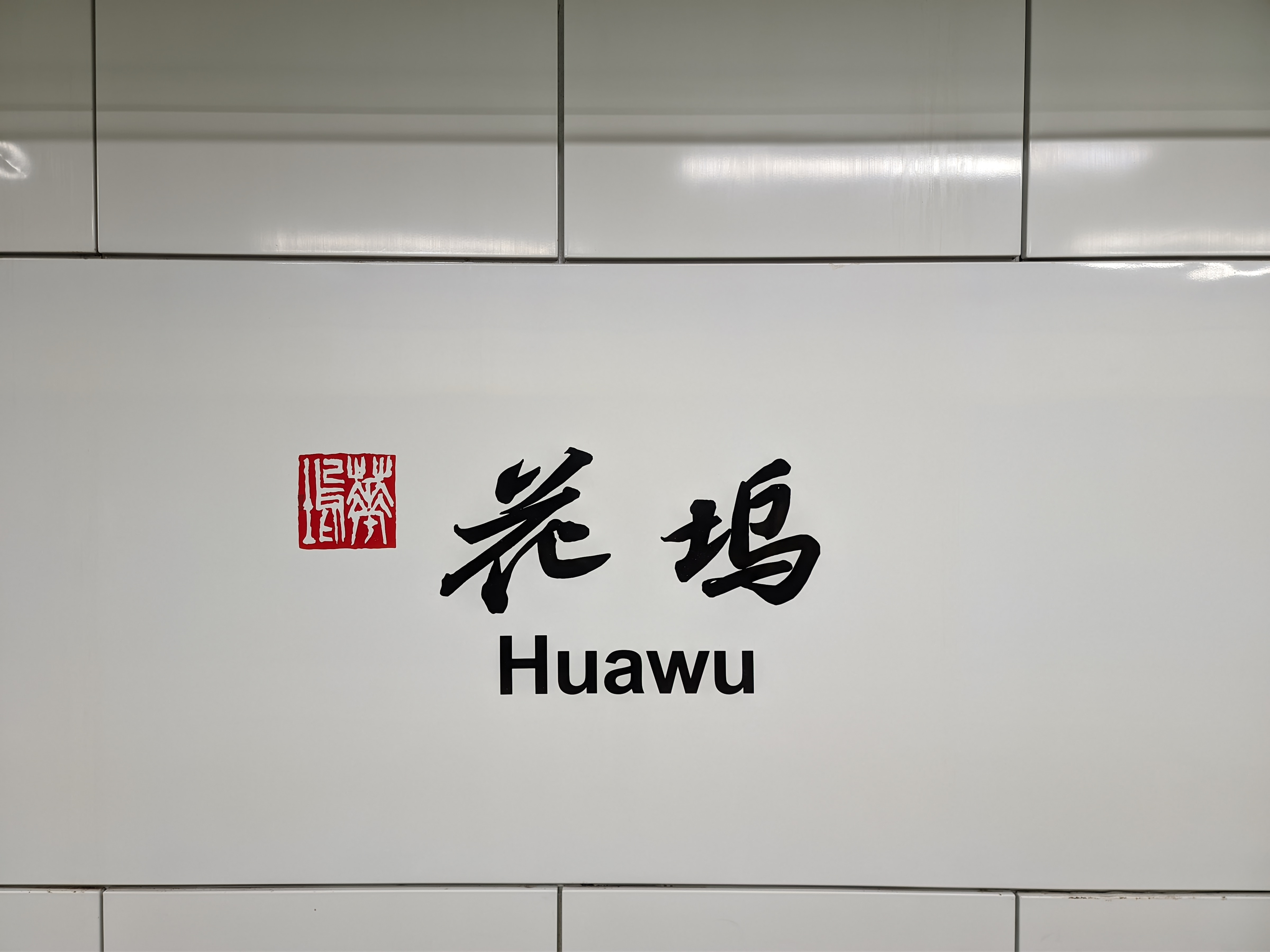
Station name in Chinese calligraphy

== Entrances/exits ==
- A: Gaozhuang Entrance/exit of Xixi National Wetland Park
- B: Gaozhuang Entrance/exit of Xixi National Wetland Park
- C: south side of Tianmushan Road, west side of Huajiang Road
- D: south side of Tianmushan Road, east side of Huajiang Road
