= Tongxie Road station =

Metro station in Hangzhou, China

Tongxie Road 同协路
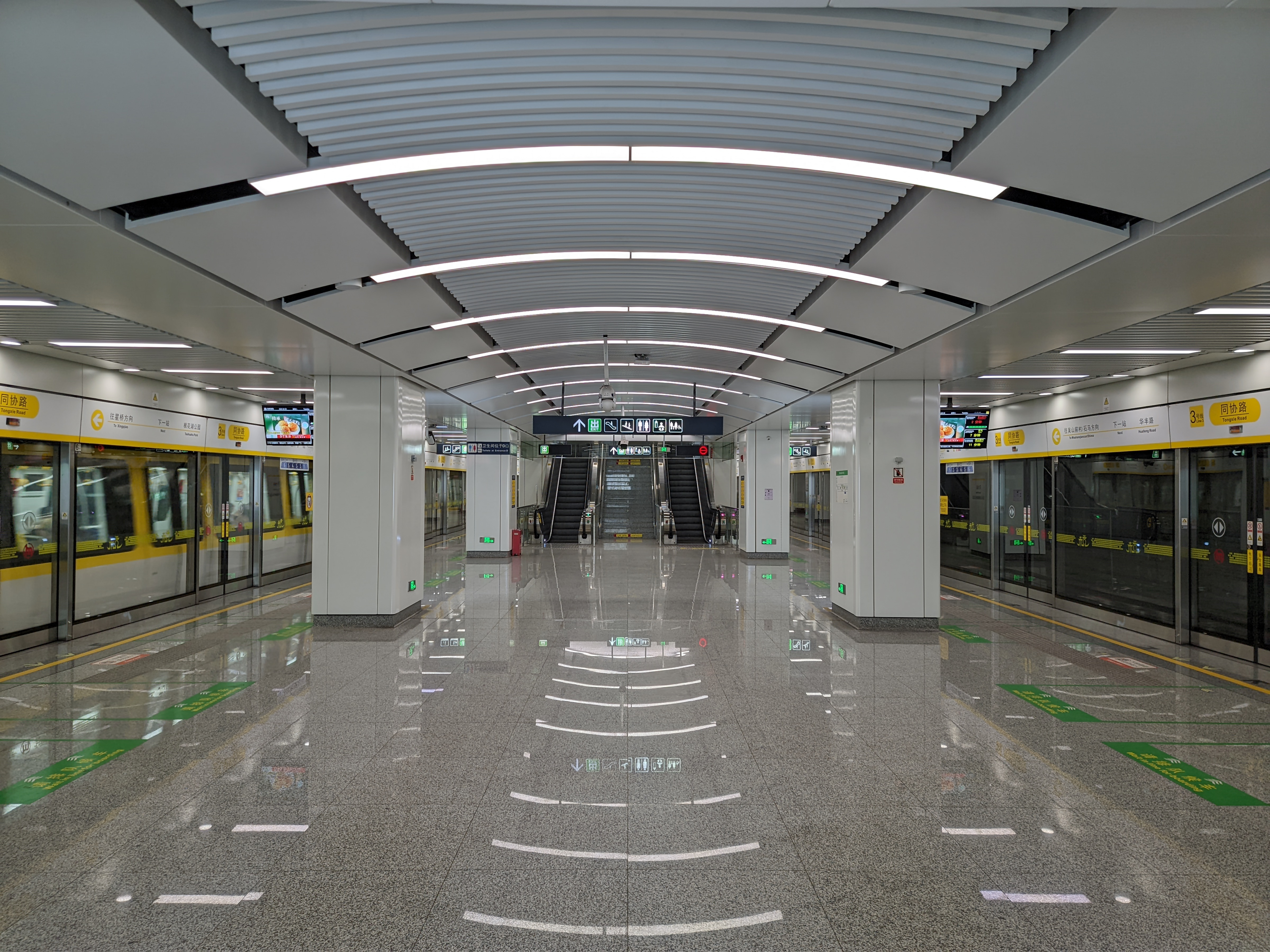
- Platforms

General information
- Location: Tongxie Road; Shangcheng District / Gongshu District, Hangzhou, Zhejiang; China
- Coordinates: 30.3468°N 120.2072°E
- System: Hangzhou metro station
- Operator: Hangzhou Metro Corporation
- Line: Line 3
- Platforms: 2 (1 island platform)

History
- Opened: 21 February 2022

Services
| Preceding station | Hangzhou Metro | Following station |
|---|---|---|
| Huafeng Road towards Wushanqiancun or Shima | Line 3 | Taohuahu Park towards Xingqiao |
Location

Tongxie Road (simplified Chinese: 同协路; traditional Chinese: 同協路) is a metro station of Line 3 of the Hangzhou Metro in China. It is located in the junction of Shangcheng District and Gongshu District of Hangzhou. The station was opened on 21 February 2022.

== Station layout ==
Tongxie Road has two levels: a concourse, and an island platform with two tracks for line 3.

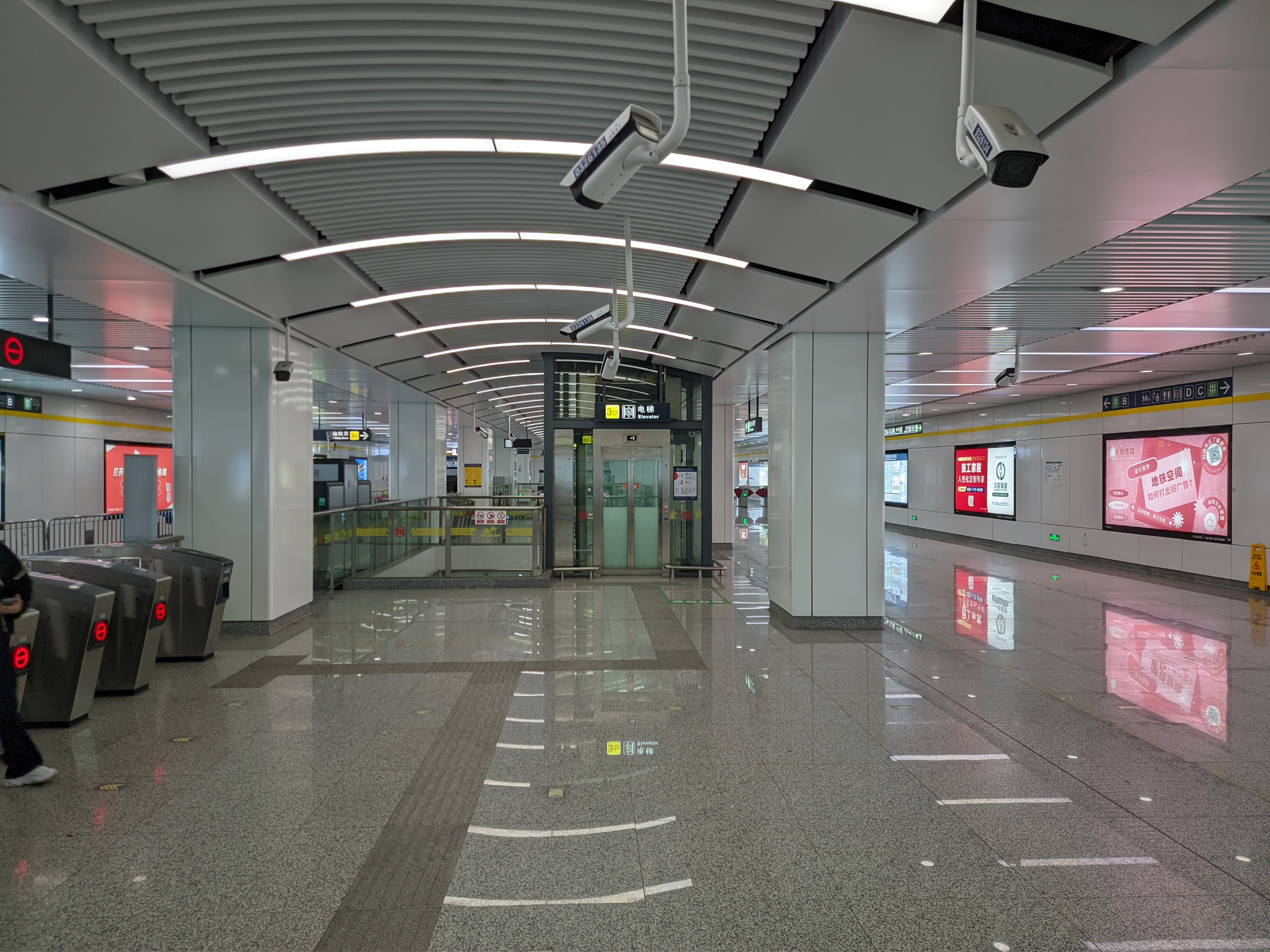
Concourse

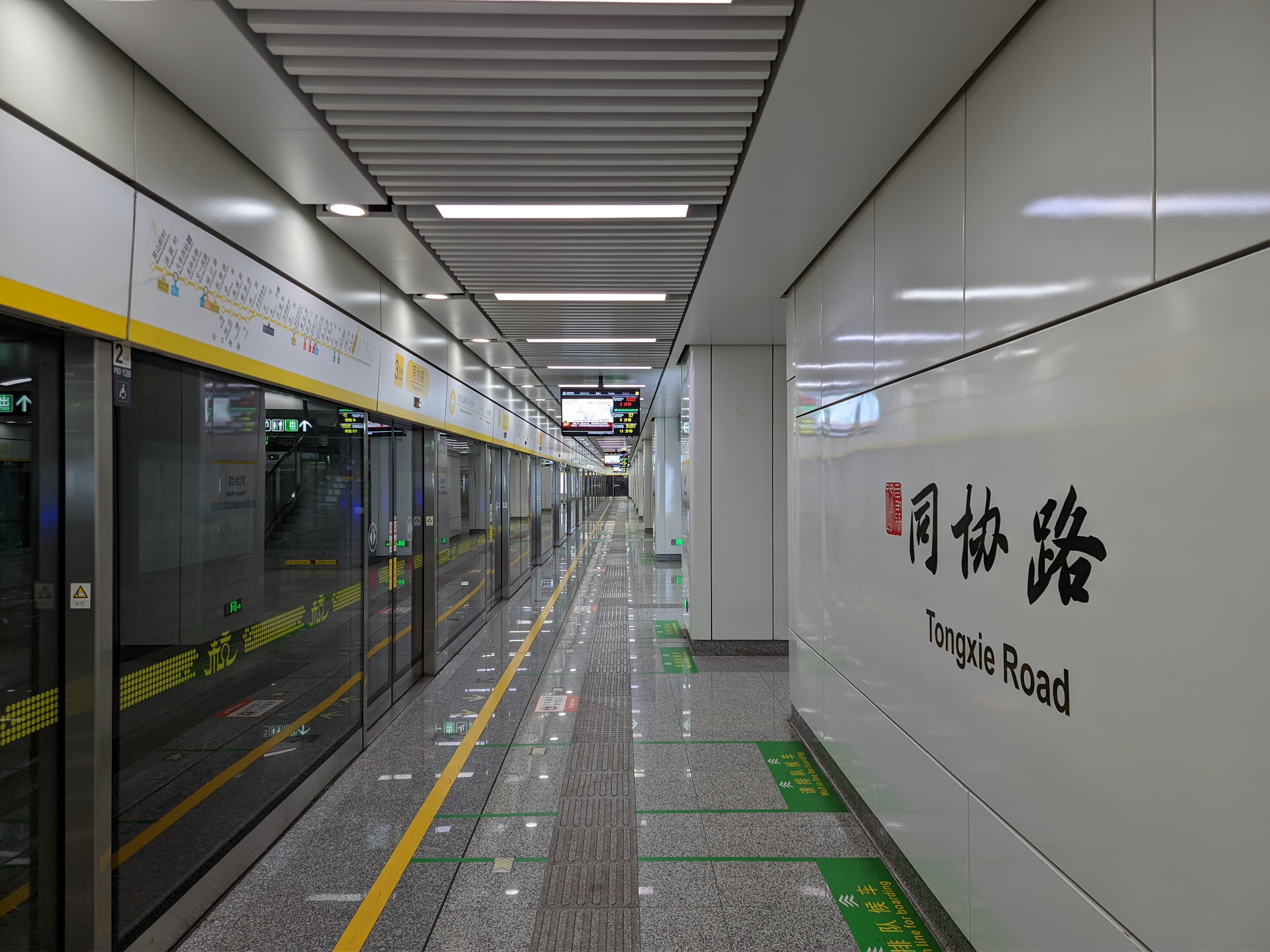
Platforms

== Entrances/exits ==
- B: west side of Tongxie Road, Hangzhou Gongshu WUYUE PLAZA
- C: west side of Tongxie Road, Hangbo Street, Hangzhou Gongshu WUYUE PLAZA
- D: east side of Tongxie Road, Hangbo Street
