= Huahe Street station =

Metro station in Hangzhou, China

Huahe Street 华鹤街
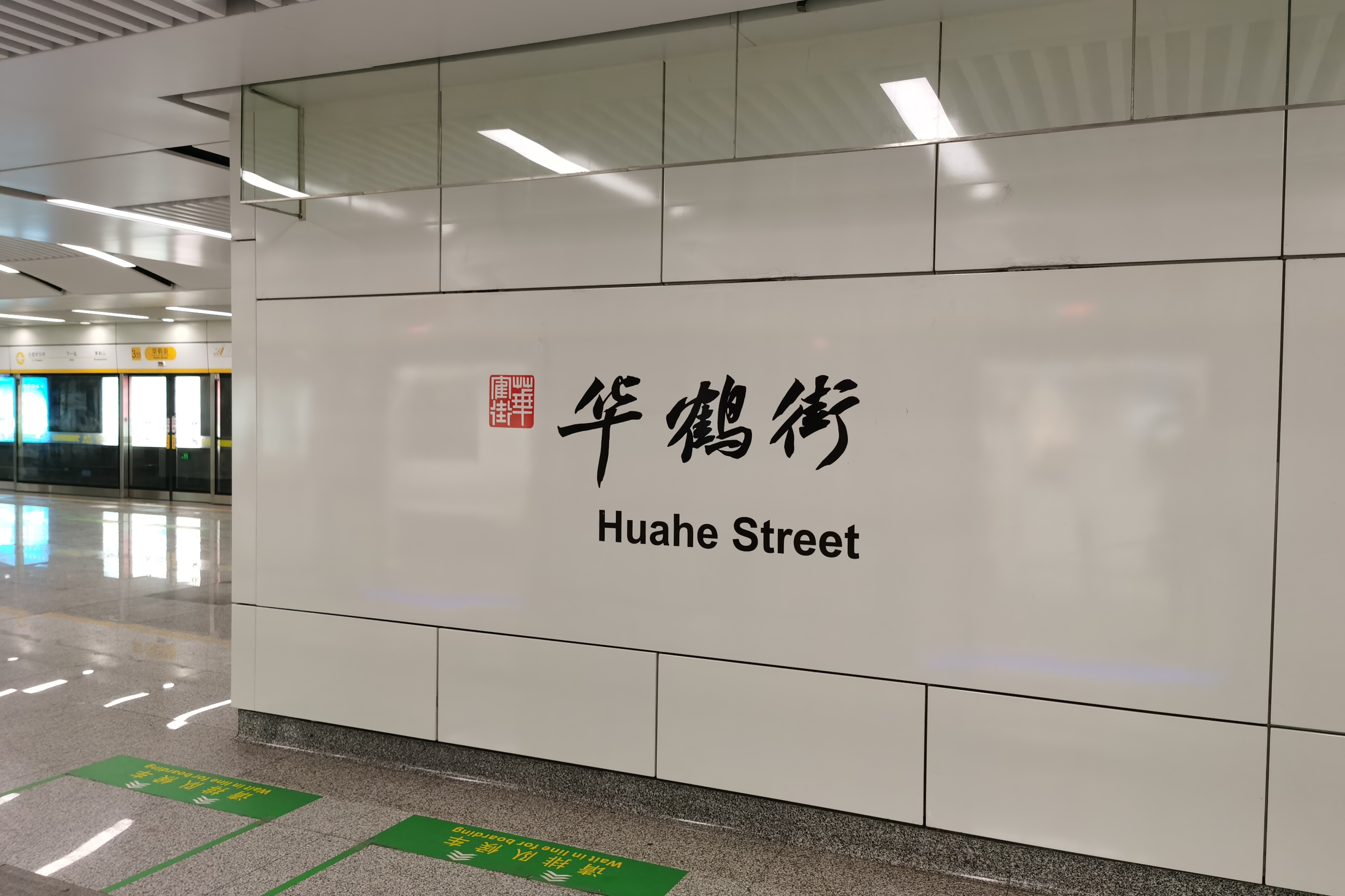

General information
- Location: Tiandu Road × Huahe Street; Shangcheng District, Hangzhou, Zhejiang; China
- Coordinates: 30.37295°N 120.23341°E
- System: Hangzhou metro station
- Operator: Hangzhou Metro Corporation
- Line: Line 3
- Platforms: 2 (1 island platform)
- Tracks: 2

Construction
- Structure type: Underground
- Accessible: Yes

History
- Opened: 21 February 2022

Services
Preceding station	Hangzhou Metro	Following station
Dingqiao towards Wushanqiancun or Shima	Line 3	Huangheshan towards Xingqiao
Location

Huahe Street (simplified Chinese: 华鹤街; traditional Chinese: 華鶴街) is a metro station of Line 3 of the Hangzhou Metro in China. It is located in Shangcheng district of Hangzhou. The station was opened on 21 February 2022.

== Station layout ==
Huahe Street has two levels: a concourse, and an island platform with two tracks for line 3.

== Entrances/exits ==
- A: Lexiangwan Community
- B: Luolan Xianggu Community
- C: north side of Tiandu Road, west side of Huahe Street
- D: north side of Tiandu Road, Dongfenggang Road
- E: south side of Tiandu Road, west side of Huahe Street
