= Taohuahu Park station =

Metro station in Hangzhou, China

Coordinates: 30.3538°N 120.2167°E

Taohuahu Park 桃花湖公园
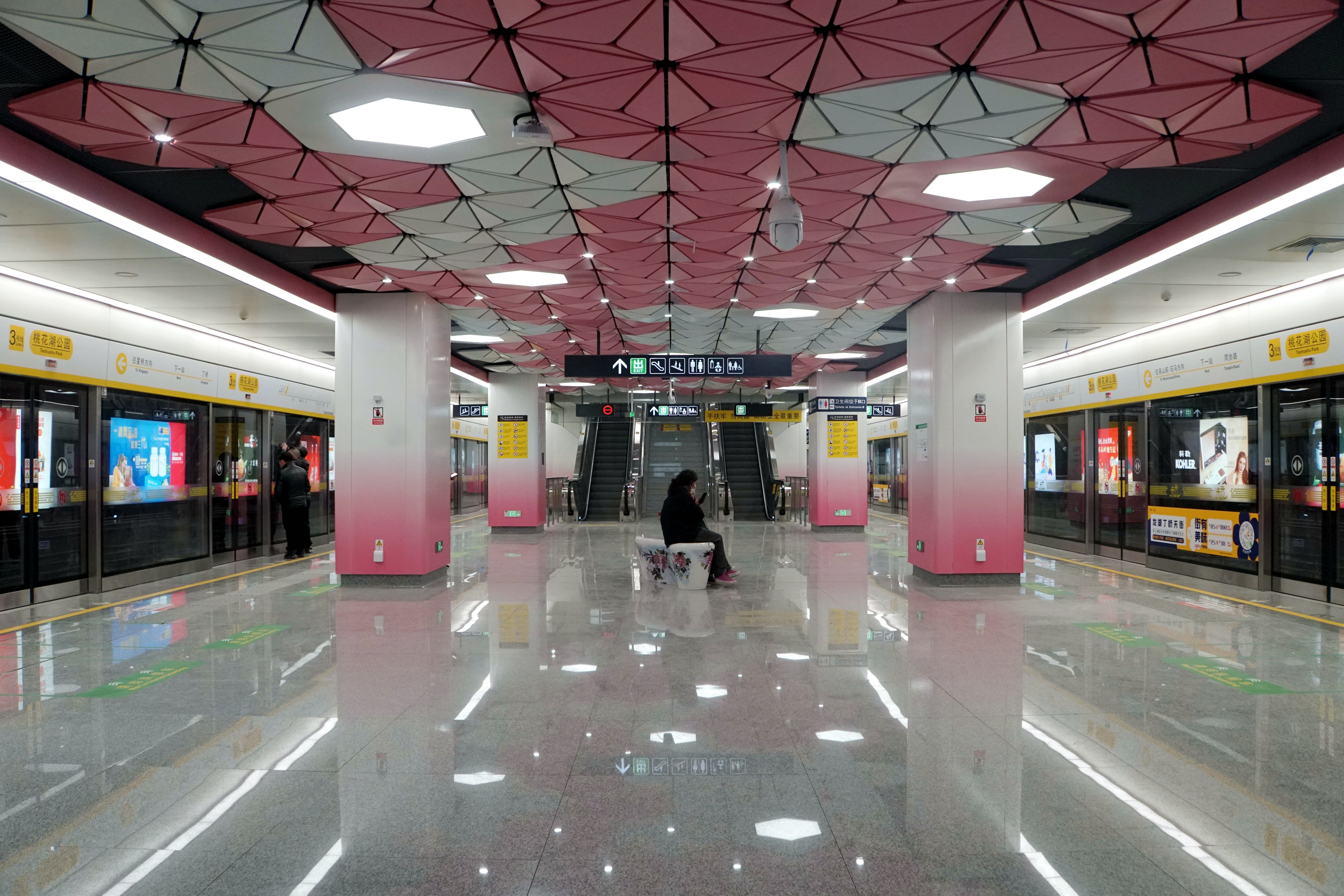
- Platforms

General information
- Location: Danonggang Road × Zhaojiabang Road/Dingqiao Road; Shangcheng District, Hangzhou, Zhejiang; China
- System: Hangzhou metro station
- Operator: Hangzhou Metro Corporation
- Line: Line 3
- Platforms: 2 (1 island platform)
- Tracks: 2

Construction
- Structure type: Underground
- Accessible: Yes

History
- Opened: 21 February 2022

Services
| Preceding station | Hangzhou Metro | Following station |
|---|---|---|
| Tongxie Road towards Wushanqiancun or Shima | Line 3 | Dingqiao towards Xingqiao |
Location

Taohuahu Park (simplified Chinese: 桃花湖公园; traditional Chinese: 桃花湖公園; lit. 'Peach Blossom Lake Park') is a metro station of Line 3 of the Hangzhou Metro in China. It is located in Shangcheng District of Hangzhou. The station was opened on 21 February 2022. It's named by the Peach Blossom Lake Park near the station.

== Station layout ==
Taohuahu Park has two levels: a concourse, and an island platform with two tracks for line 3.

== Design ==
Taohuahu Park Station is themed "A Blossoming Peach Blossom Land" (Chinese: 锦簇桃源). Using the triangle as a basic element, it incorporates Issey Miyake's "Pleats Please" design concept to form petal-like shapes. These petal patterns come together to create the impression of a lush, blooming floral scene, capturing the vibrant springtime atmosphere of Peach Blossom Lake Park.

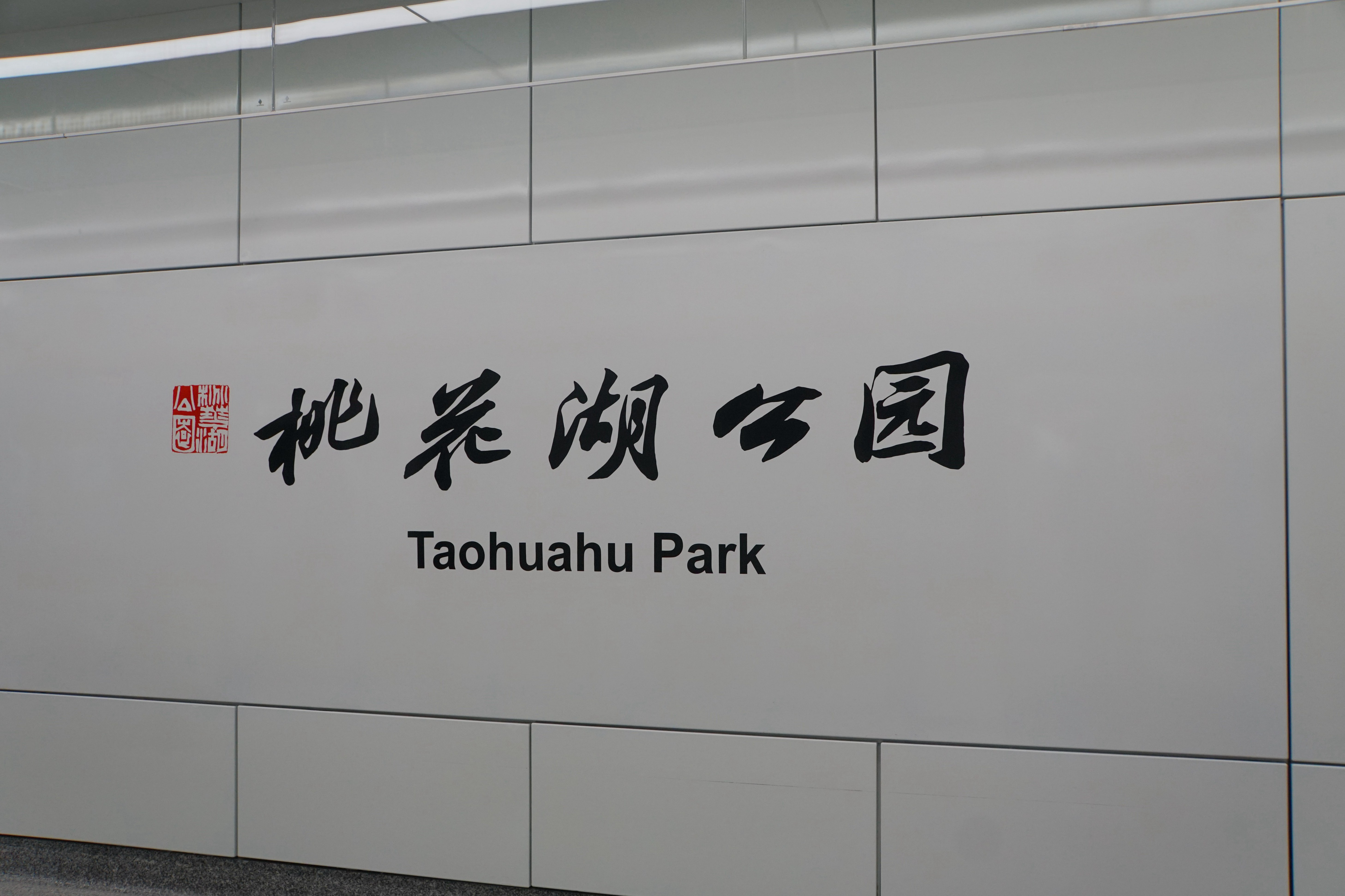
Station name in Chinese calligraphy

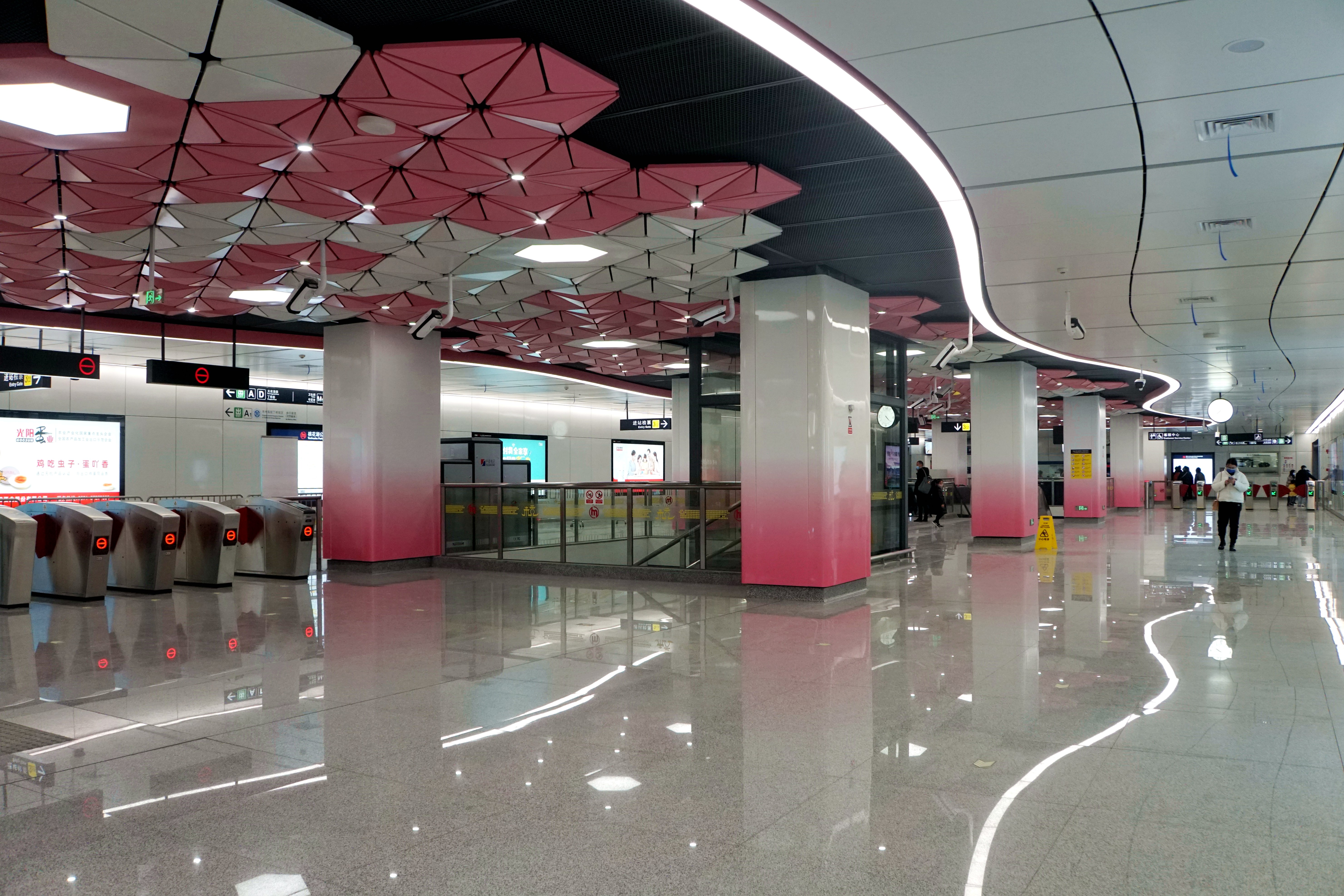
Concourse

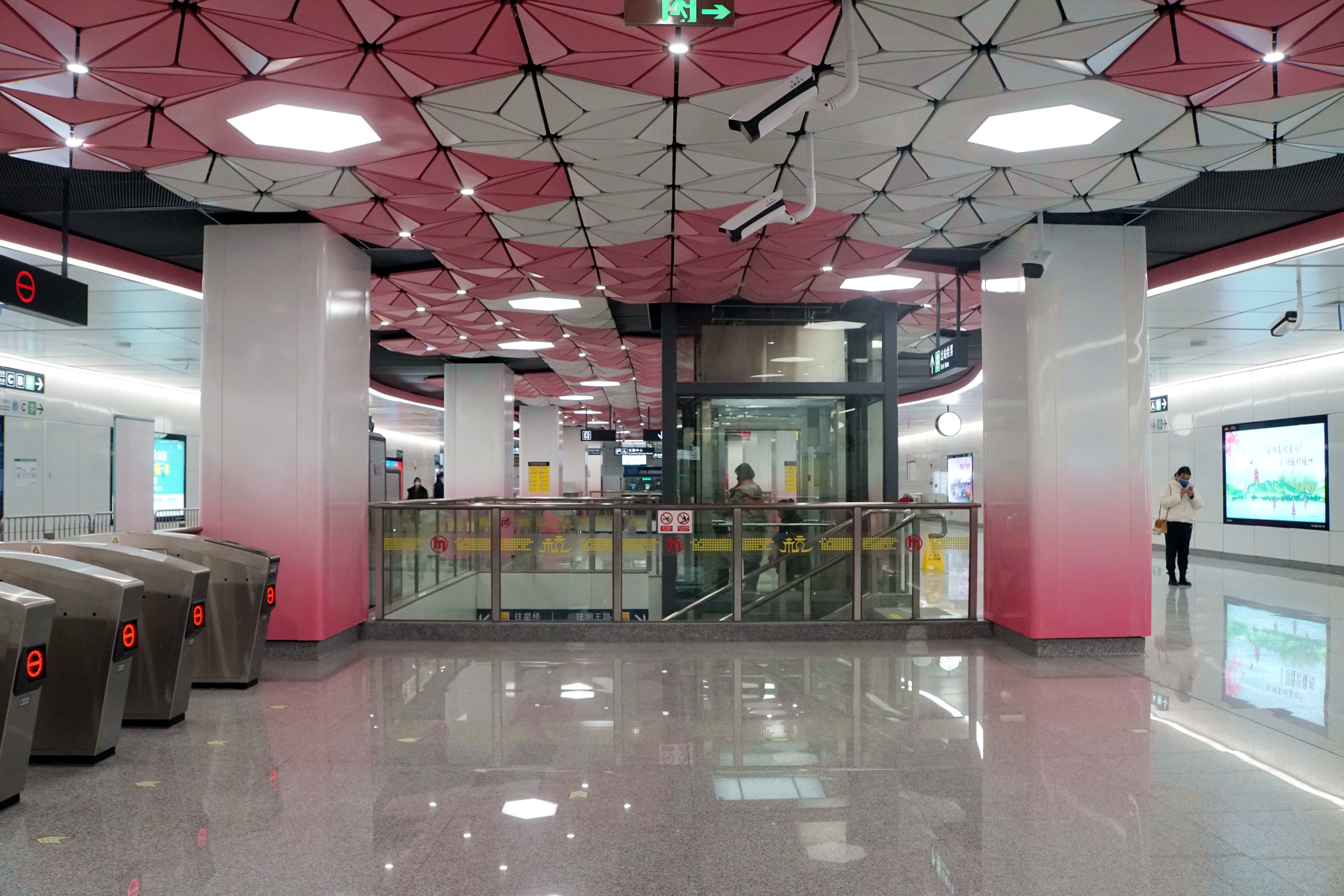
Concourse

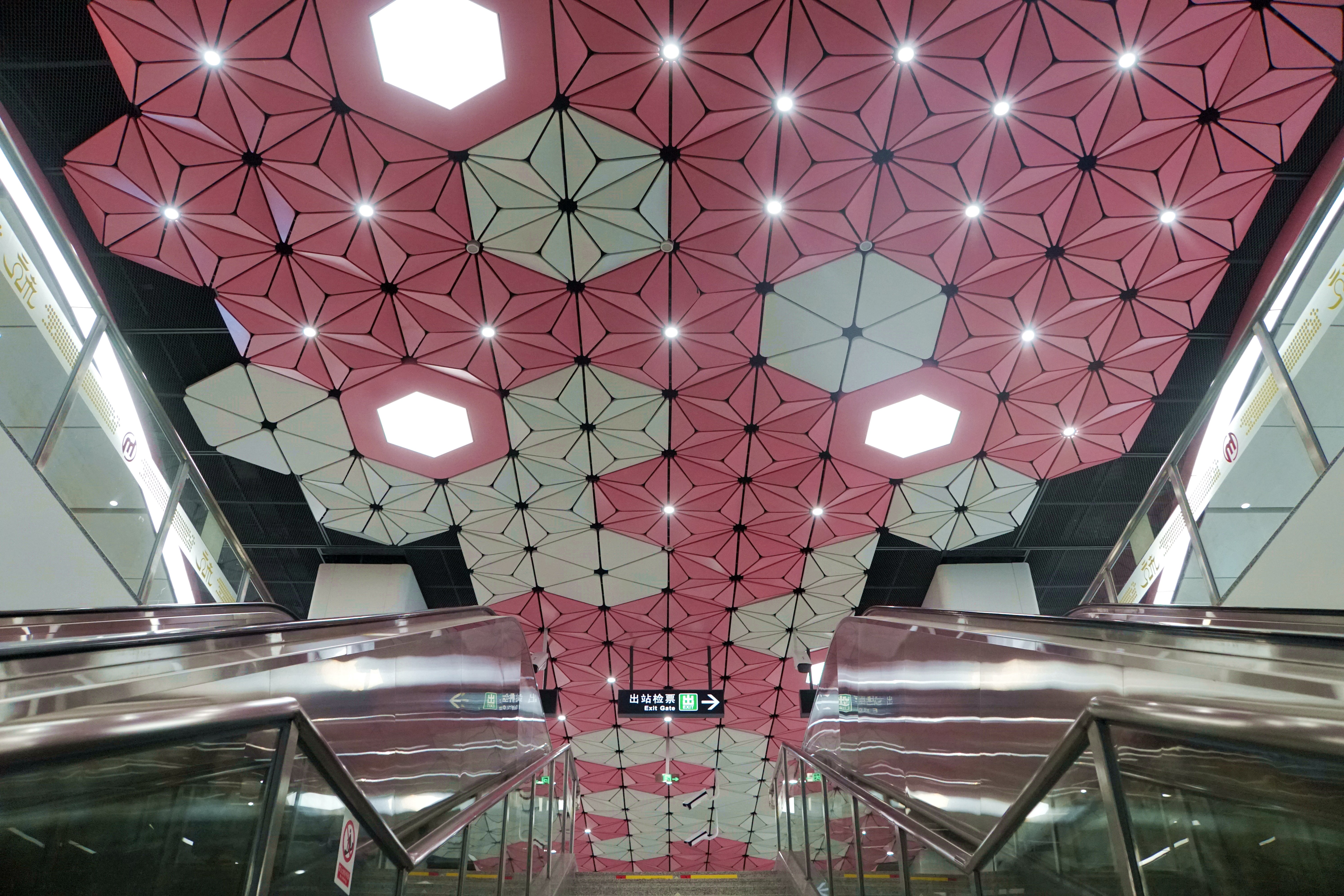
Ceiling

== Entrances/exits ==
- A1: north side of Danongggang Road, west side of Dingqiao Road
- A2: north side of Danongggang Road, east side of Dingqiao Road
- B1: Zhaojiabang Road
- B2: Taohuahu Park
- C: south side of Danonggang Road
- D: south side of Danonggang Road, Dingqiao Road
