= Gudun Road station =

Metro station in Hangzhou, China

Gudun Road 古墩路
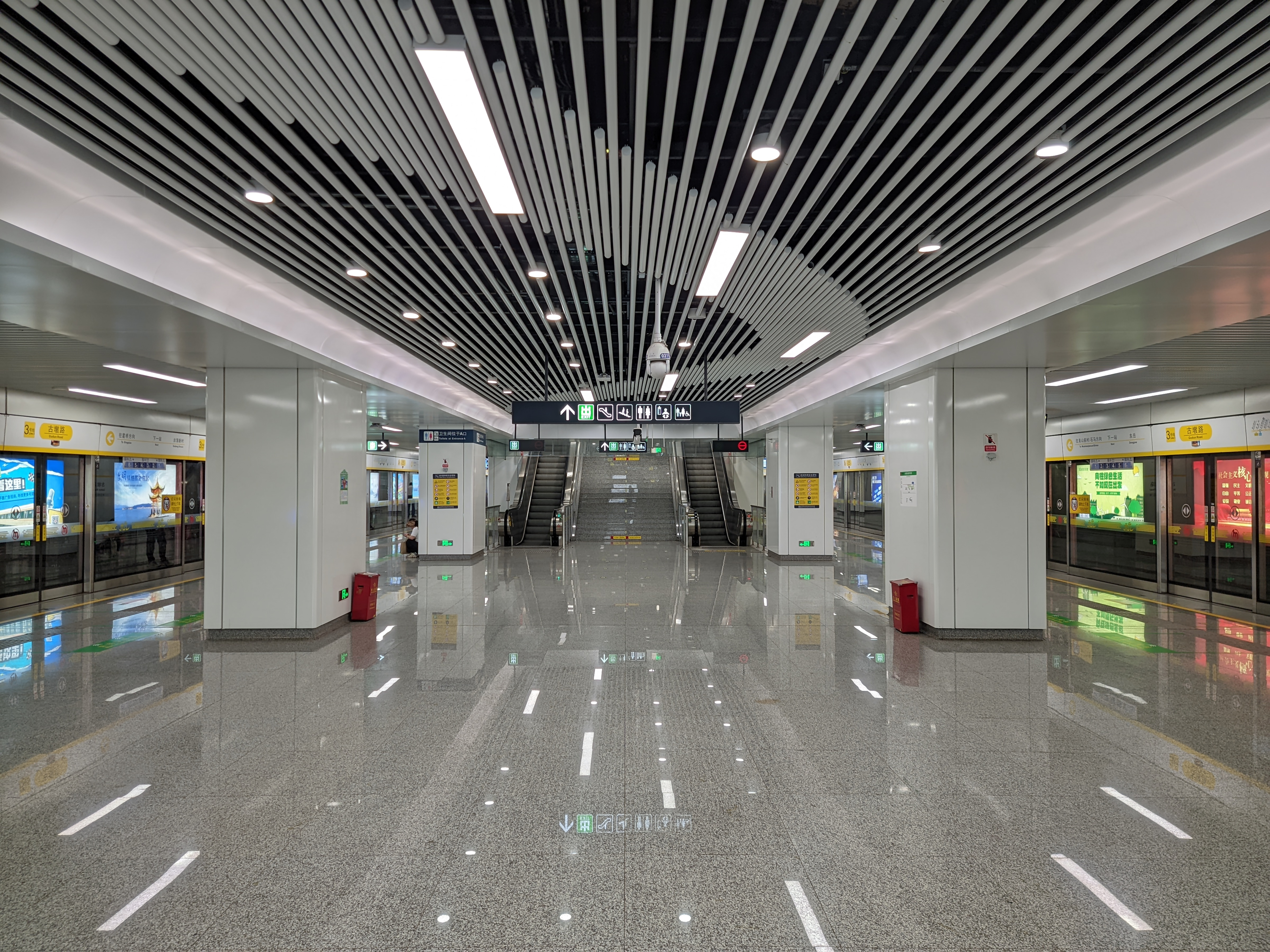
- Platforms

General information
- Location: Tianmushan Road × Gudun Road; Xihu District, Hangzhou, Zhejiang; China
- Coordinates: 30.26755°N 120.09694°E
- System: Hangzhou metro station
- Operator: Hangzhou Metro Corporation
- Line: Line 3
- Platforms: 2 (1 island platform)

Construction
- Structure type: Underground
- Accessible: Yes

History
- Opened: 10 June 2022

Services
Preceding station	Hangzhou Metro	Following station
Dongyue towards Wushanqiancun or Shima	Line 3	Gudang Xincun towards Xingqiao
Location

Gudun Road (Chinese: 古墩路) is a metro station of Line 3 of the Hangzhou Metro in China. It is located in Xihu District of Hangzhou. The station was opened on 10 June 2022.

== Station layout ==
Gudun Road has two levels: a concourse, and an island platform with two tracks for line 3.

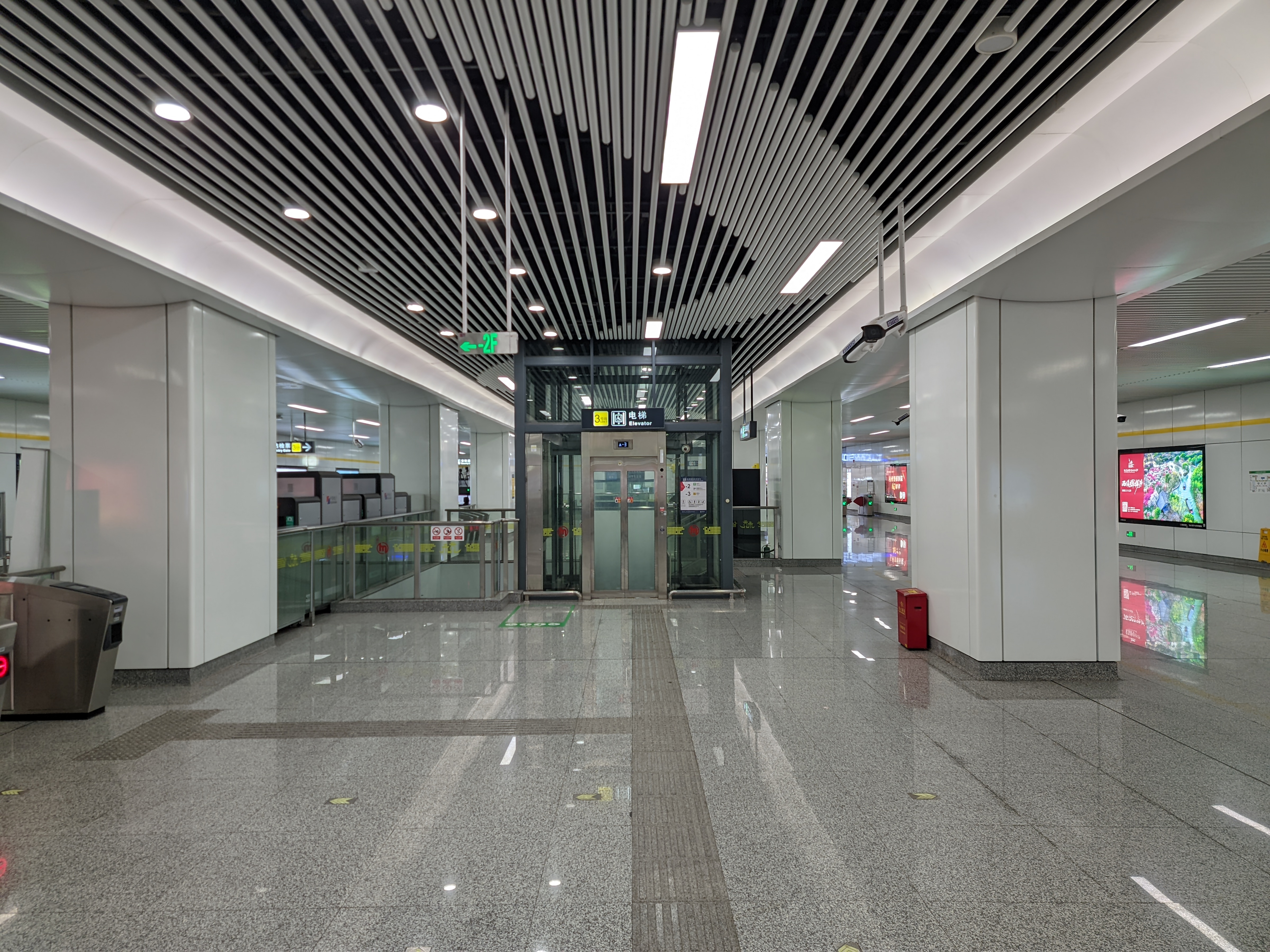
Concourse

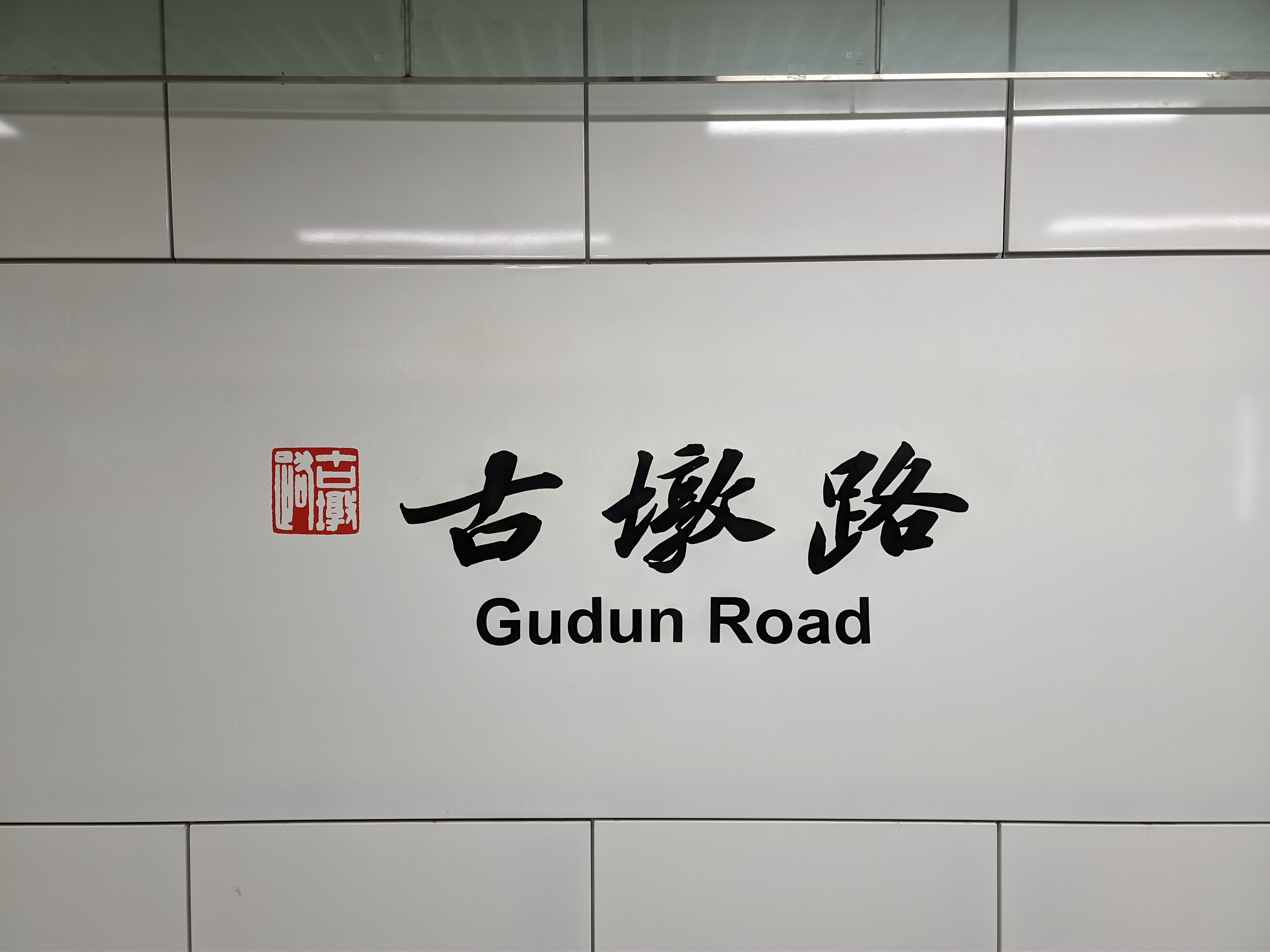
Station name in Chinese calligraphy

== Entrances/exits ==
- A: north side of Tianmushan Road, east side of Gudun Road
- B: north side of Tianmushan Road, west side of Gudun Road
- C: south side of Tianmushan Road, west side of Gudun Road
- D: south side of Tianmushan Road, east side of Gudun Road
