= Dingqiao station =

Metro station in Hangzhou, China

Dingqiao 丁桥
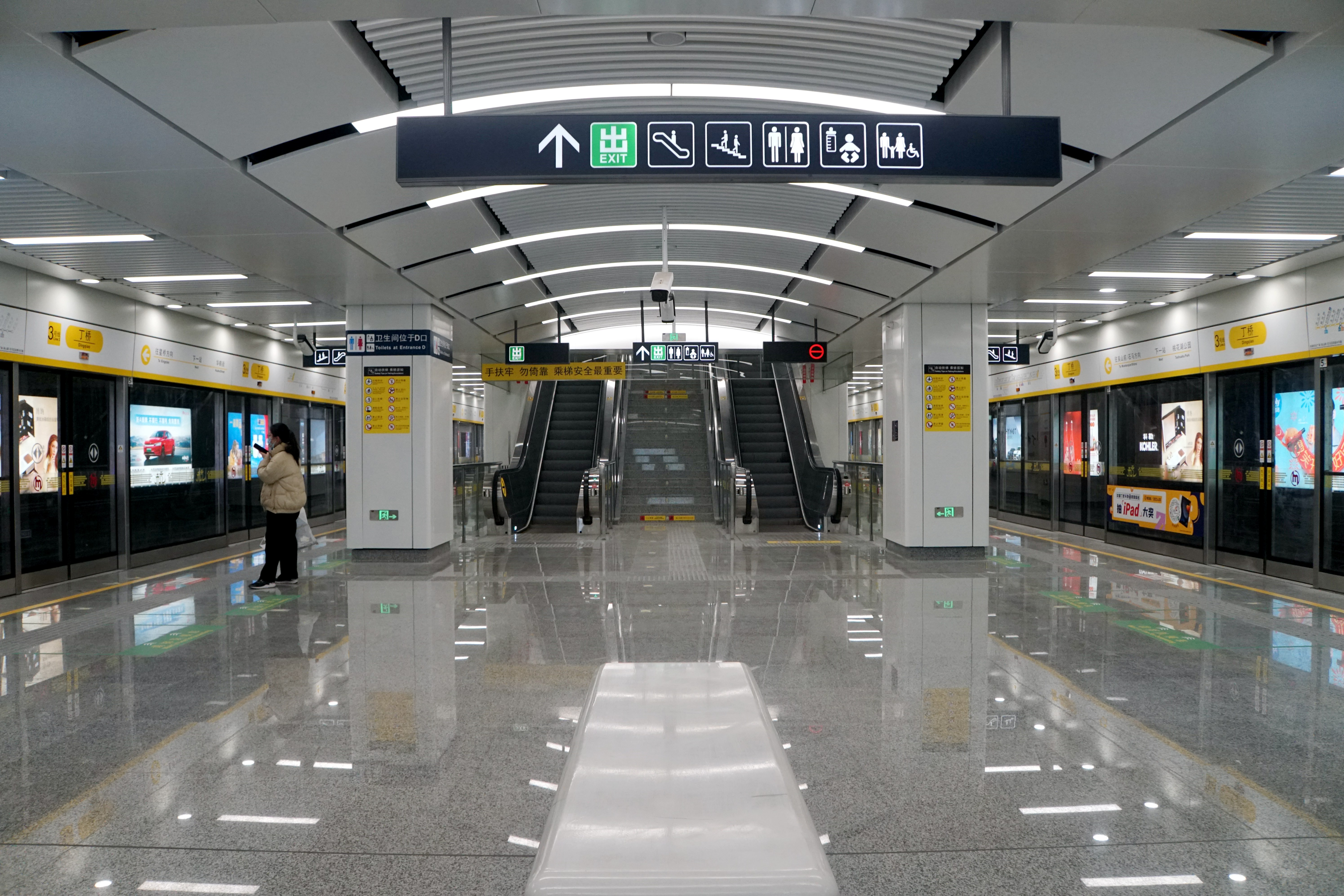

General information
- Location: Danonggang Road; Shangcheng District, Hangzhou, Zhejiang; China
- Coordinates: 30.3581°N 120.22974°E
- System: Hangzhou metro station
- Operator: Hangzhou Metro Corporation
- Line: Line 3
- Platforms: 2 (1 island platform)

Construction
- Accessible: Yes

History
- Opened: 21 February 2022

Services
Preceding station	Hangzhou Metro	Following station
Taohuahu Park towards Wushanqiancun or Shima	Line 3	Huahe Street towards Xingqiao
Location

Dingqiao (simplified Chinese: 丁桥; traditional Chinese: 丁橋; pinyin: Dīngqiáo) is a metro station of Line 3 of the Hangzhou Metro in China. It is located in Shangcheng District of Hangzhou. The station was opened on 21 February 2022.

== Station layout ==
Dingqiao has two levels: a concourse, and an island platform with two tracks for line 3.

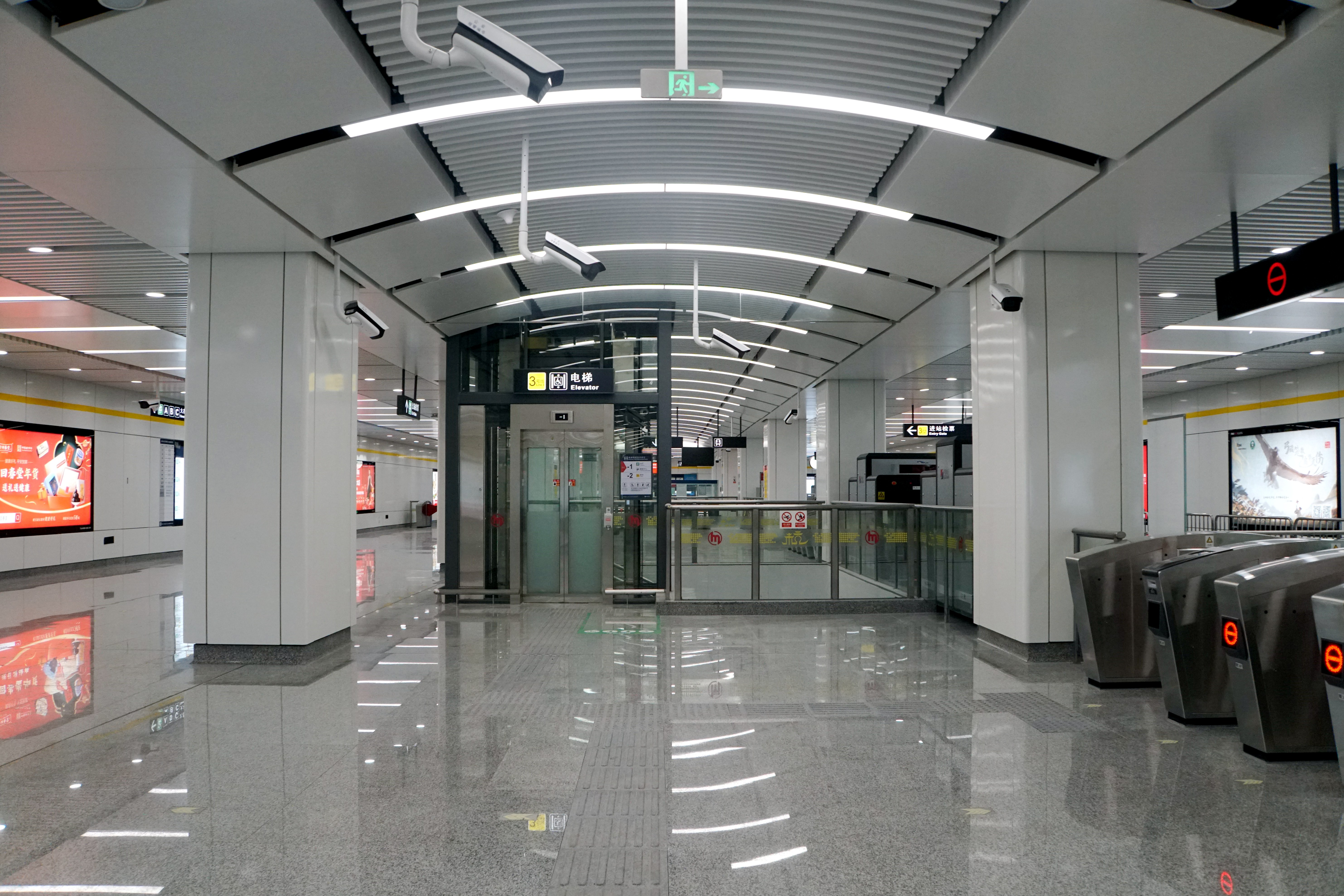
Concourse

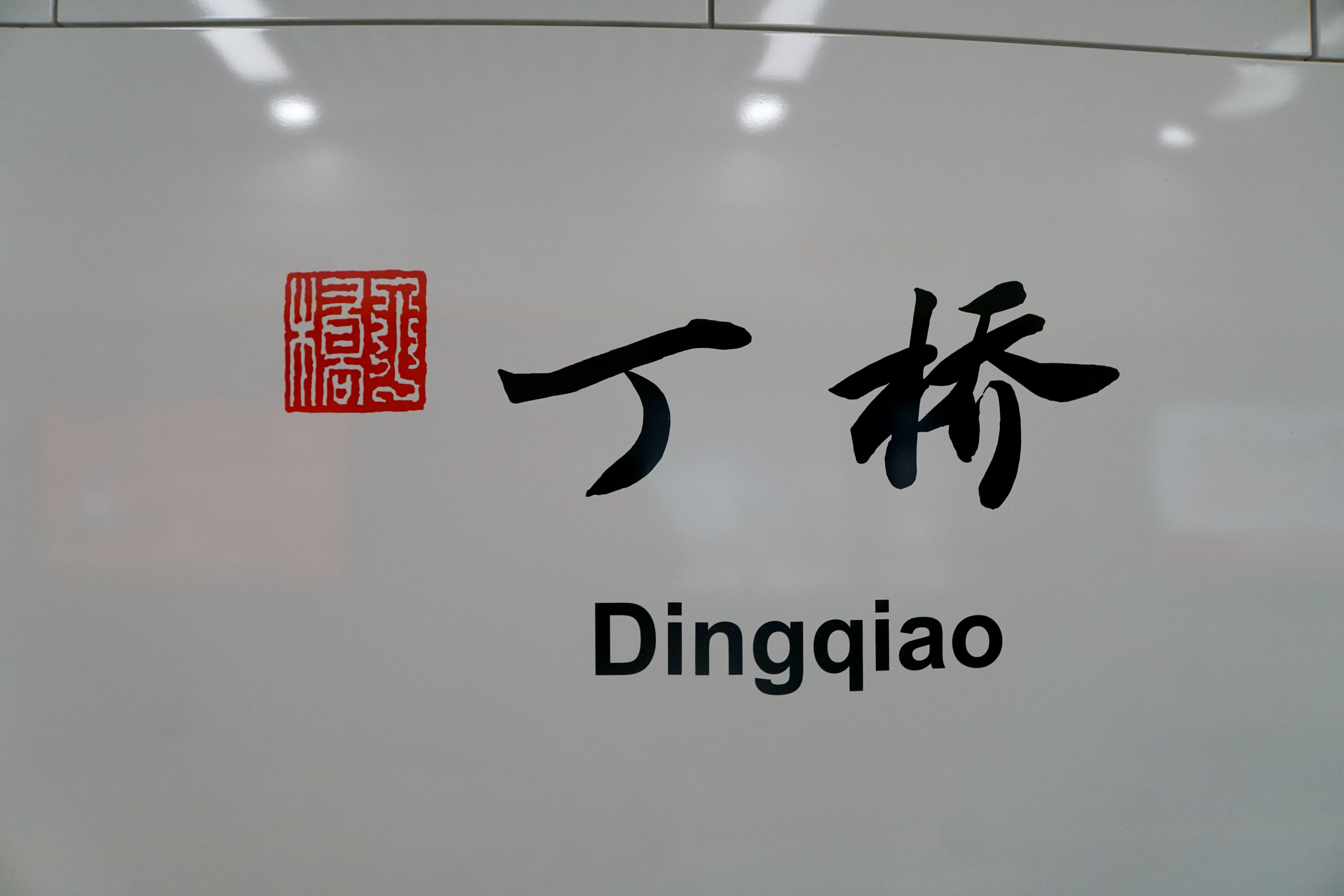
Station name

== Entrances/exits ==
- A: south side of Danonggang Road
- B1: Qinfeng Road
- C: north side of Danonggang Road
- D: Changhong Road
