= Gudang Xincun station =

Metro station in Hangzhou, China

Gudang Xincun 古荡新村
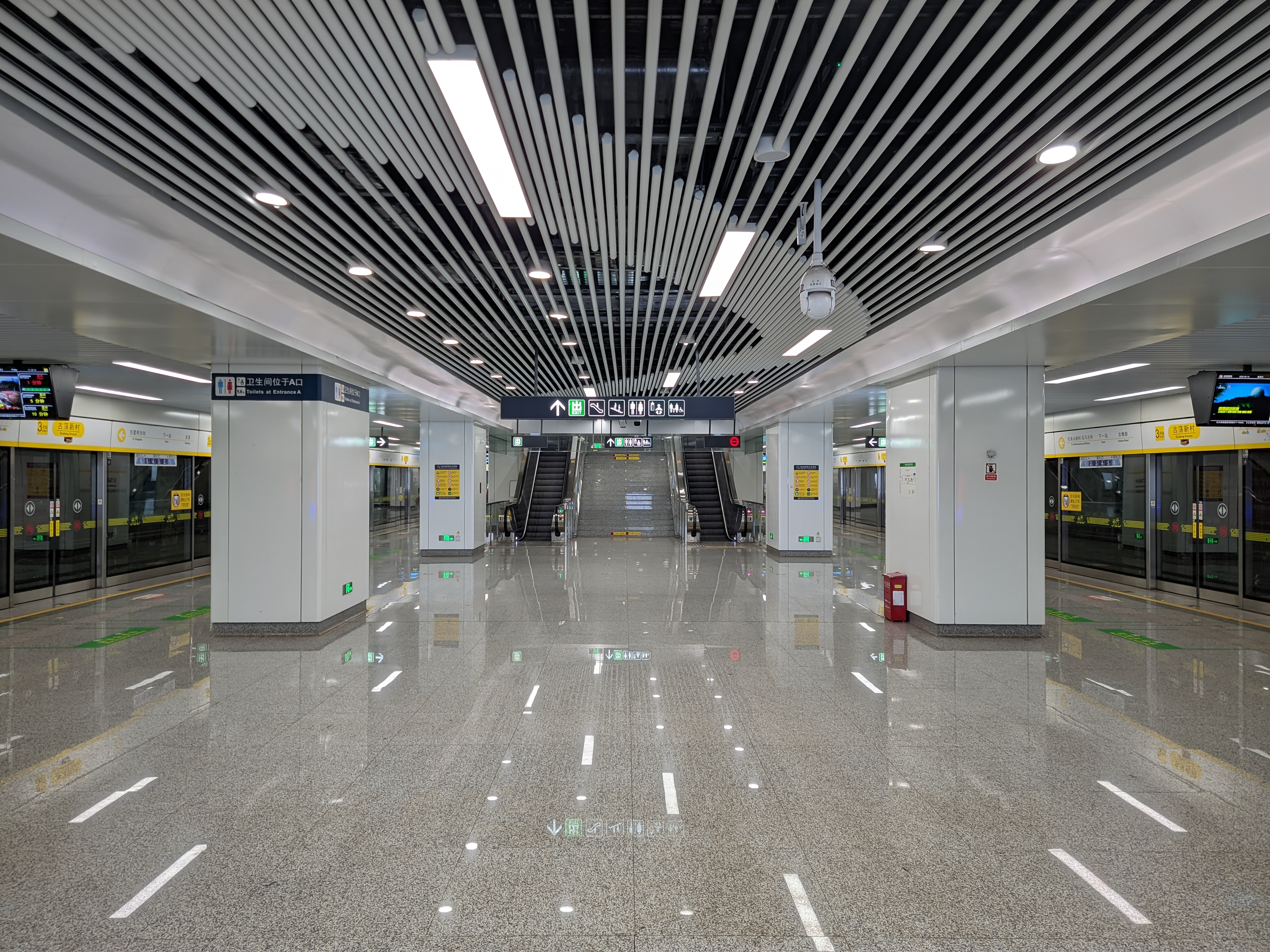
- Platforms

General information
- Location: Tianmushan Road × Fengtan Road; Xihu District, Hangzhou, Zhejiang; China
- Coordinates: 30.27292°N 120.10803°E
- System: Hangzhou metro station
- Operator: Hangzhou Metro Corporation
- Line: Line 3
- Platforms: 2 (1 island platform)

Construction
- Structure type: Underground
- Accessible: Yes

History
- Opened: 10 June 2022

Services
Preceding station	Hangzhou Metro	Following station
Gudun Road towards Wushanqiancun or Shima	Line 3	Gudang towards Xingqiao
Location

Gudang Xincun (simplified Chinese: 古荡新村; traditional Chinese: 古蕩新村) is a metro station of Line 3 of the Hangzhou Metro in China. It is located in Xihu District of Hangzhou. The station was opened on 10 June 2022.

== Station layout ==
Gudang Xincun has two levels: a concourse, and an island platform with two tracks for line 3.

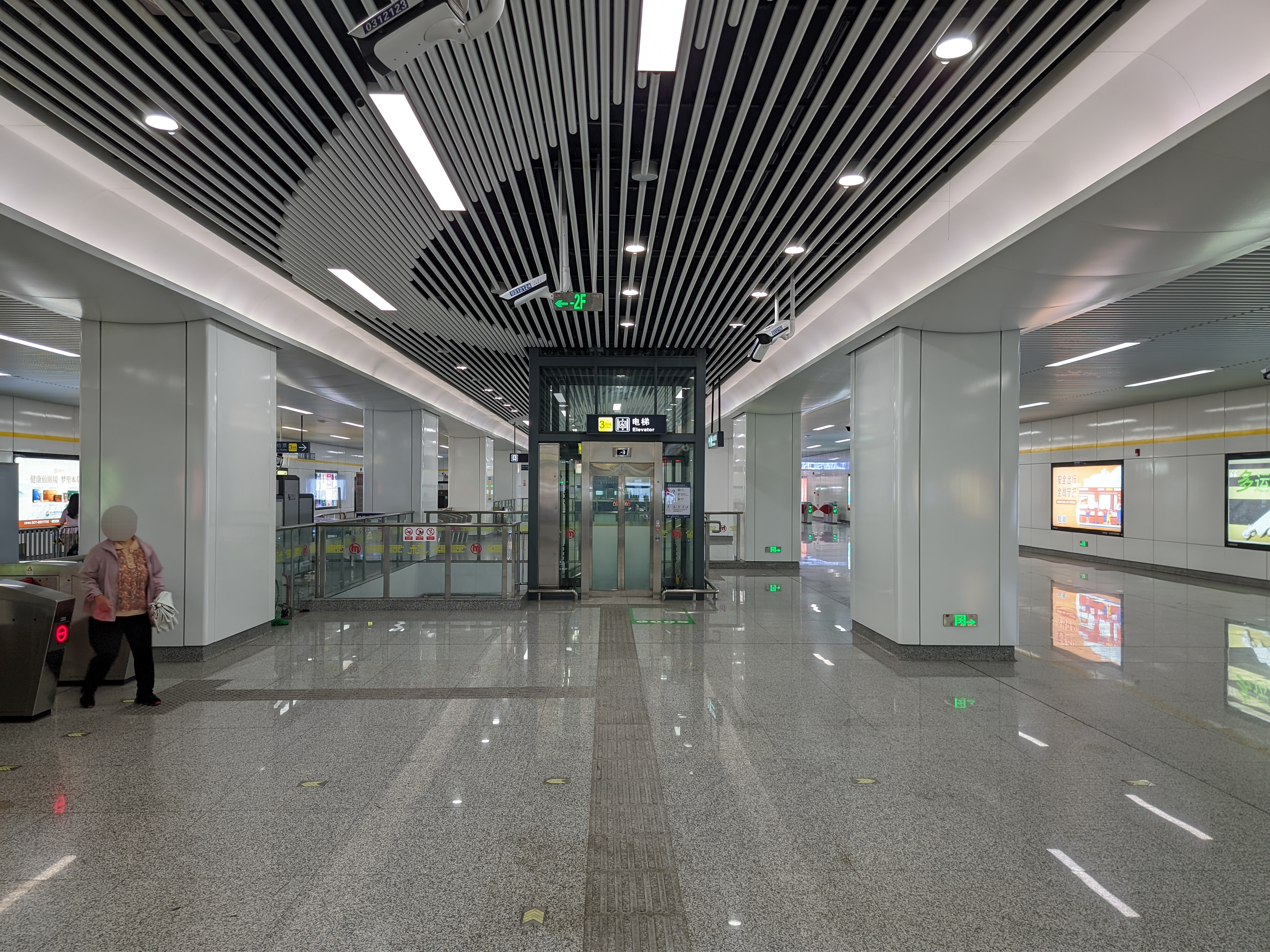
Concourse

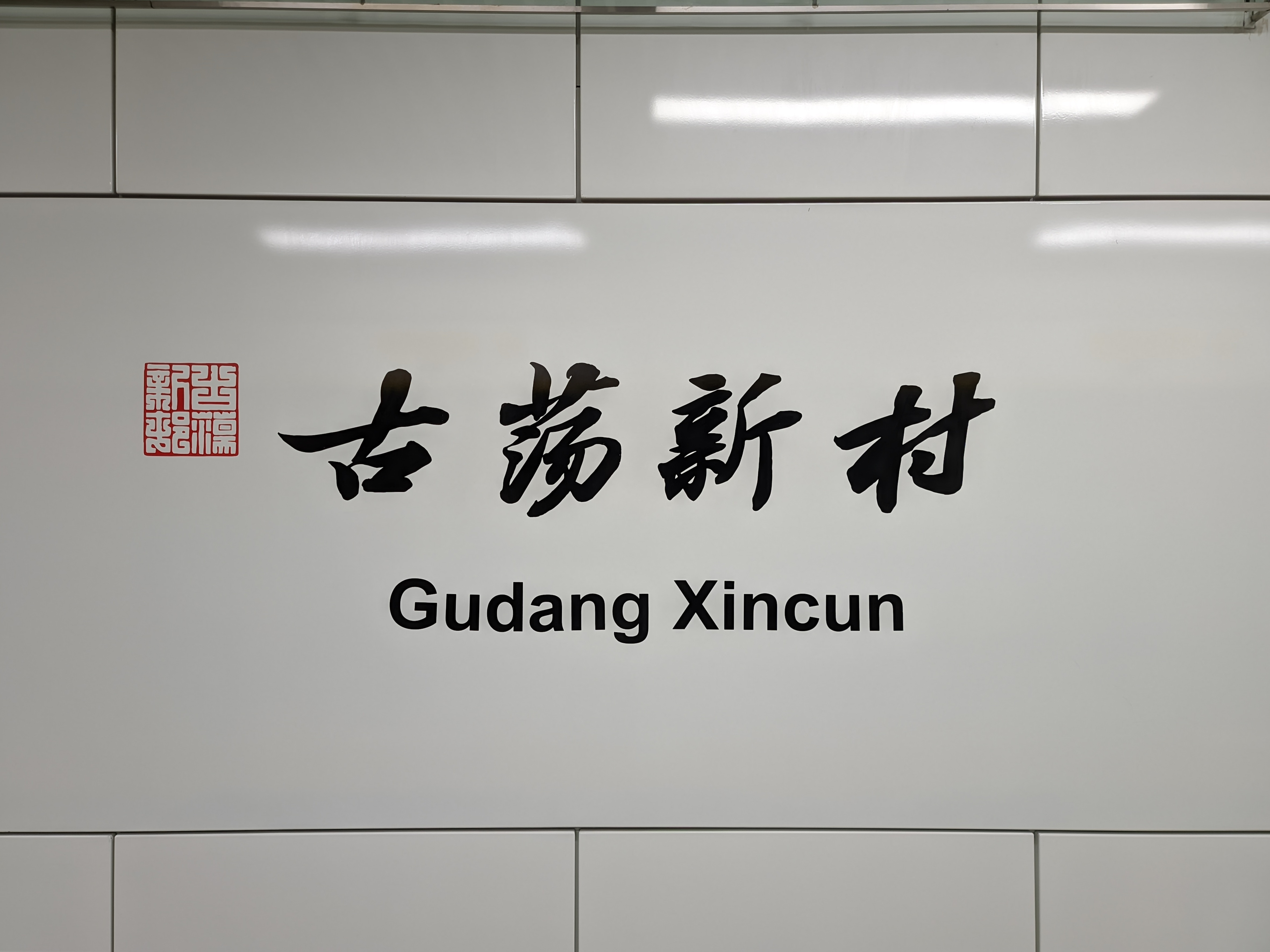
Station name in Chinese calligraphy

== Entrances/exits ==
- A: Gudang Xincun Community (West Zone)
- B: Shanshui Renjia
- D: Hangzhou Seventh People's Hospital
