= Huangheshan station =

Metro station in Hangzhou, China

Huangheshan 黄鹤山
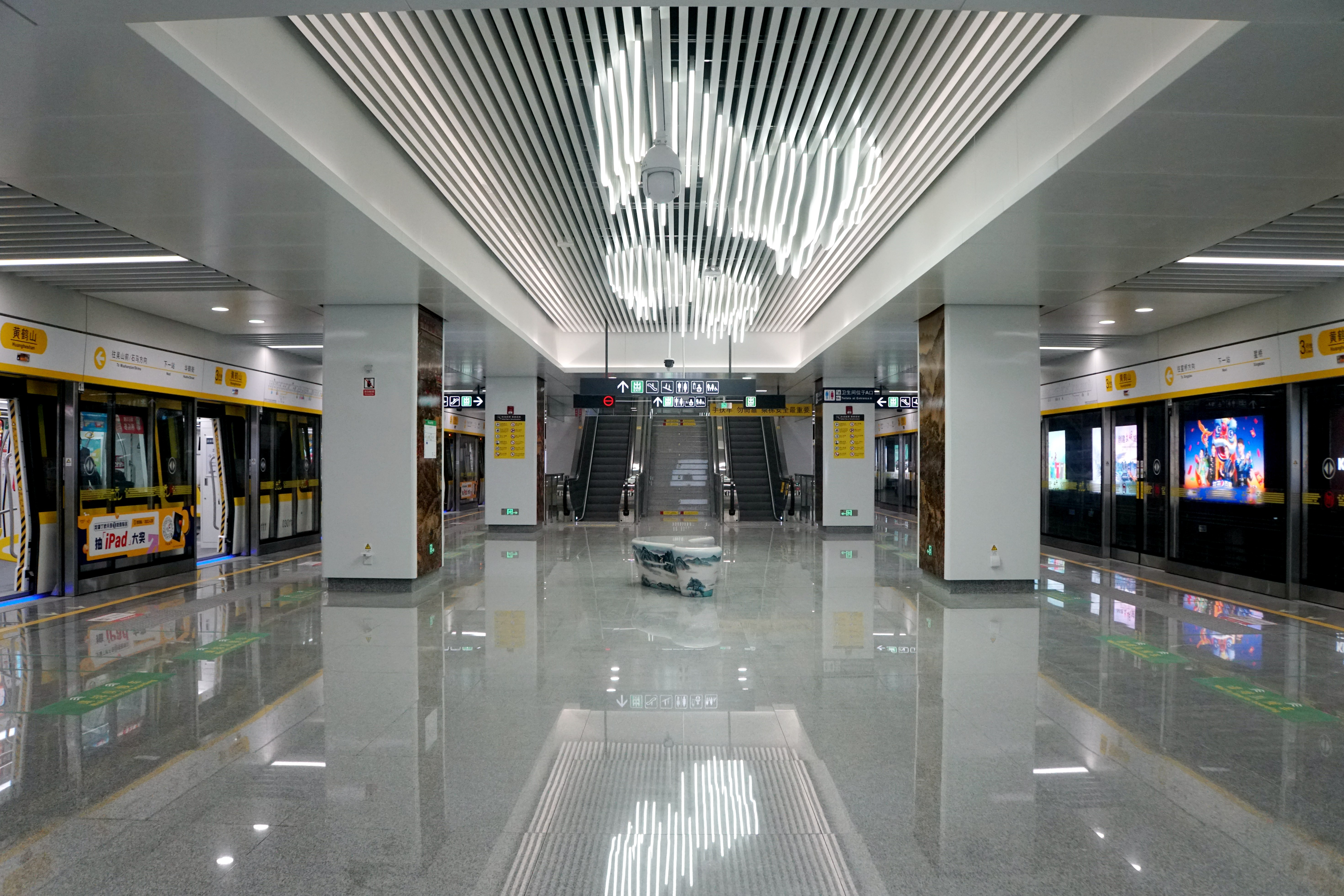

General information
- Other names: Tianducheng (former name)
- Location: Xingqiao Subdistrict, Linping District, Hangzhou, Zhejiang; China
- Operated by: Hangzhou Metro Corporation
- Line: Line 3

History
- Opened: 22 February 2022

Services
Preceding station	Hangzhou Metro	Following station
Huahe Street towards Wushanqiancun or Shima	Line 3	Xingqiao Terminus
Location

Huangheshan (Chinese: 黄鹤山) is a metro station of Line 3 of the Hangzhou Metro in China. It is located in Tianducheng (Sky City) community in Xingqiao Subdistrict, Linping District, Hangzhou. The station was opened on 22 February 2022.
