= Pingfeng (disambiguation) =

Pingfeng in Chinese most commonly refers to a folding screen.

Pingfeng can also refer to:

- Mount Pingfeng, mountain in Xiulin Township, Hualien County, Taiwan
- Pingfeng station, station on the Hangzhou Metro in China
- Wu Pingfeng (born 1981), Chinese football winger
