= Pingfeng station =

Metro station in Hangzhou, China

Pingfeng 屏峰
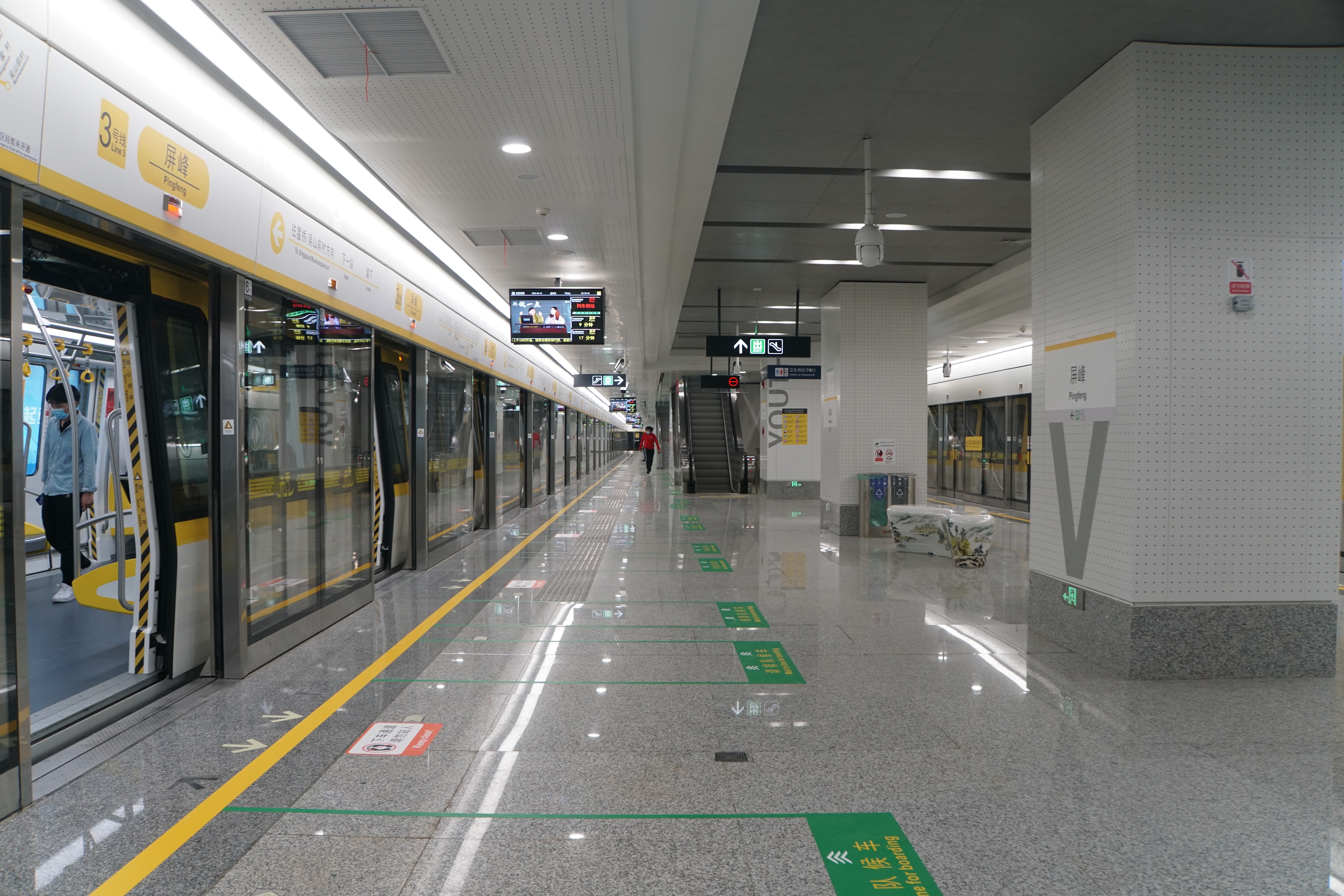
- Platform towards Xingqiao

General information
- Location: Liuhe Road; Xihu District, Hangzhou, Zhejiang; China
- Coordinates: 30°13′31″N 120°01′57″E
- Operated by: Hangzhou Metro Corporation
- Line: Line 3
- Platforms: 4 (2 island platforms)

Construction
- Structure type: Underground
- Accessible: Yes

History
- Opened: 10 June 2022

Services
Preceding station	Hangzhou Metro	Following station
Xiaoheshan towards Shima	Line 3	Liuxia towards Xingqiao
Location

Pingfeng (Chinese: 屏峰) is a metro station of Line 3 of the Hangzhou Metro in China. It is located in Xihu District of Hangzhou. The station was opened on 10 June 2022.

== Station layout ==
Pingfeng has two levels: a concourse, and two island platforms with three tracks for line 3. The central track connects Xiaoheshan depot.

G	Ground level	Exits
B1	Concourse	Tickets, Customer Service Center, Convenient stores
B2		← Line 3 towards Shima (Xiaoheshan)
B2	Island Platform
B2		Line 3 spare platform
B2	Island Platform
B2		Line 3 towards Xingqiao (Liuxia) →

== Entrances/exits ==
- A: Zhejiang International Studies University
- B: north side of Liuhe Road
- C1: Hangzhou Foreign Languages School
- C2: Pingfeng Campus, Zhejiang University of Technology
- D: Zhejiang International Studies University
