= Xiaoheshan station =

Metro station in Hangzhou, China

Xiaoheshan 小和山
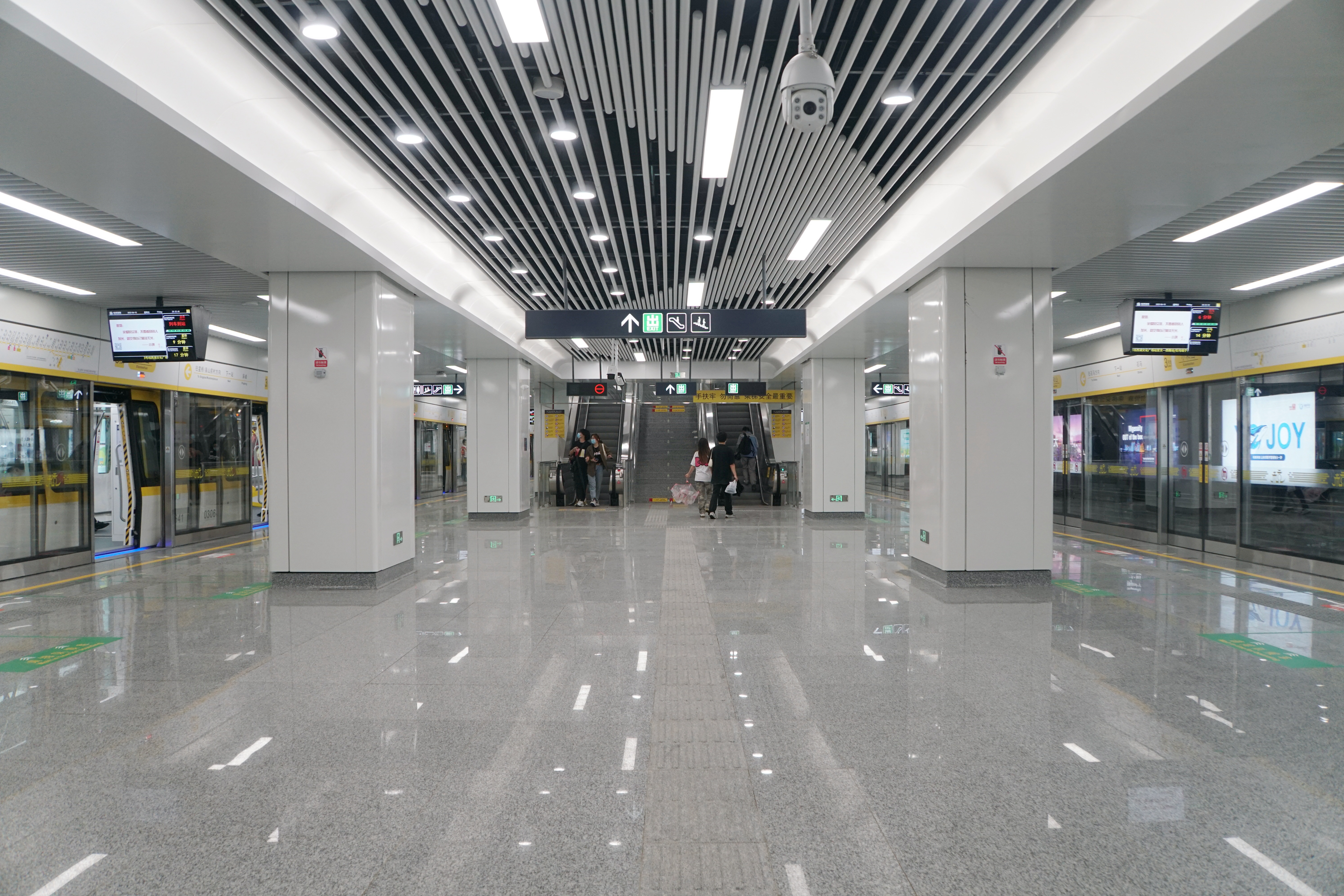
- Platform

General information
- Location: Xihu District, Hangzhou, Zhejiang; China
- Coordinates: 30°12′53″N 120°01′00″E
- Operated by: Hangzhou Metro Corporation
- Line: Line 3
- Platforms: 2 (1 island platform)

History
- Opened: 10 June 2022

Services
Preceding station	Hangzhou Metro	Following station
Shima Terminus	Line 3	Pingfeng towards Xingqiao
Location

Xiaoheshan (Chinese: 小和山) is a metro station of Line 3 of the Hangzhou Metro in China. It is located in Xihu District of Hangzhou. The station was opened on 10 June 2022.
