= Management Committee of West Lake and Xixi =

Management Committee of West Lake and Xixi 西湖西溪管委会
- Scenic Area
- Management Committee of Hangzhou West Lake Scenic Area (Management Committee of Hangzhou Xixi National Wetland Park) 杭州西湖风景名胜区管理委员会（杭州西溪国家湿地公园管理委员会）
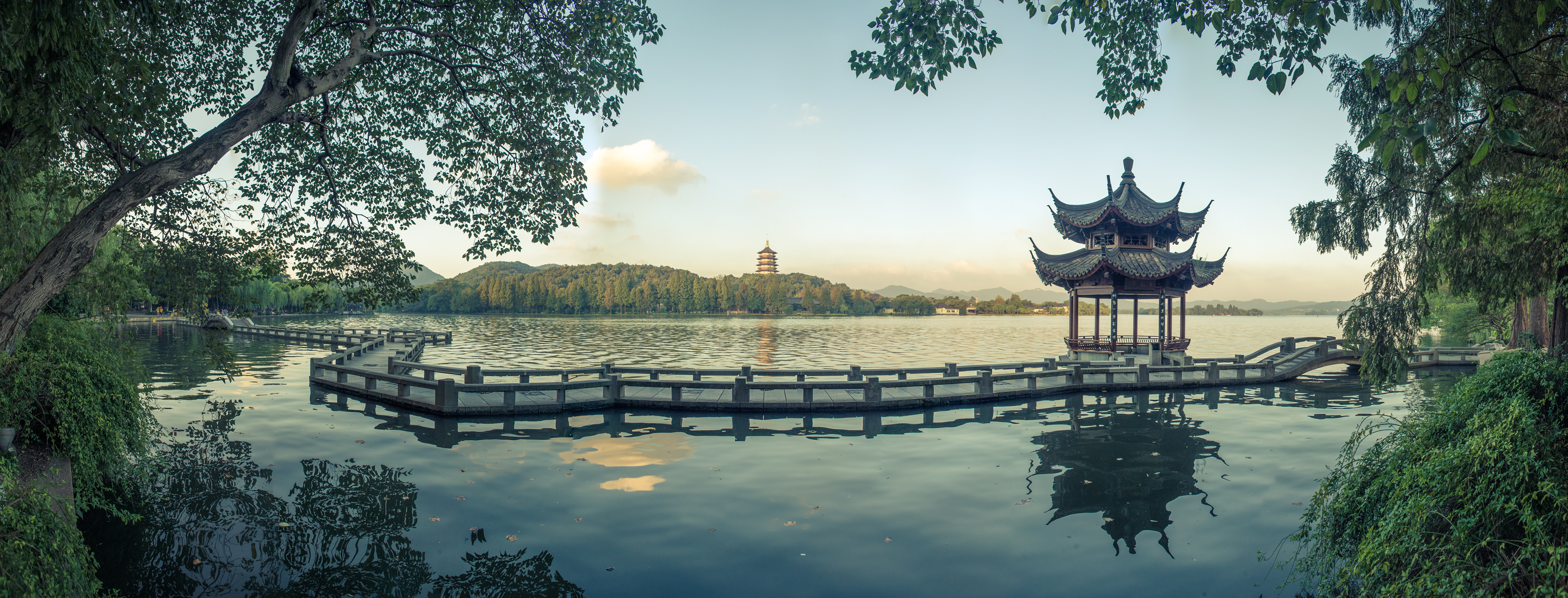
- Long Bridge Park

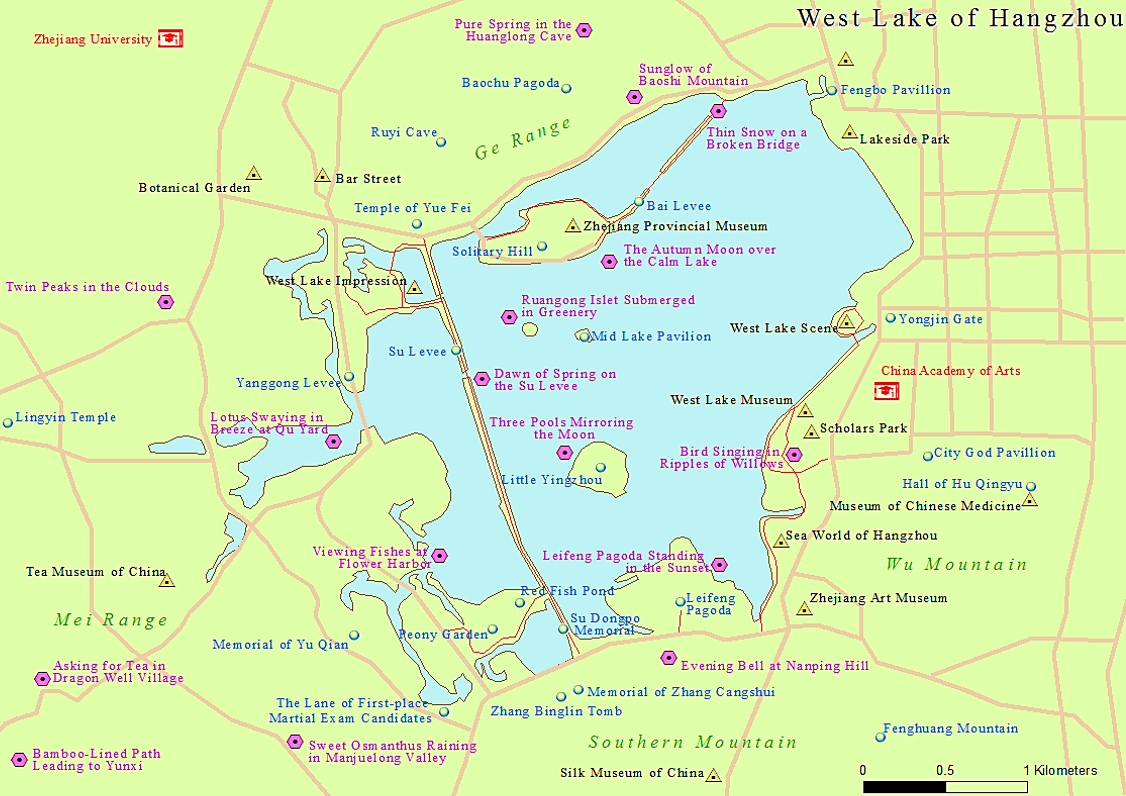
- Country: China
- Province: Zhejiang
- City: Hangzhou
- Established: September 2002
- Seat: 1 Longjing Road

Area
  - Total: 60 km^{2} (23 sq mi)

Population (2020)
  - Total: 23,763
  - Density: 400/km^{2} (1,000/sq mi)
- Time zone: UTC+8 (China Standard)
- Website: Official website in English

The Management Committee of West Lake and Xixi (simplified Chinese: 西湖西溪管委会; traditional Chinese: 西湖西溪管委會; pinyin: Xīhú Xīxī Guǎnwěihuì), officially the Management Committee of Hangzhou West Lake Scenic Area with the additional title of the Management Committee of Hangzhou Xixi National Wetland Park, is an administrative unit directly under the municipal government of Hangzhou, China. It administers Xihu Subdistrict of Xihu District, along with certain tourist attractions in Shangcheng, Gongshu, Xihu and Yuhang districts. Within its administrative domain, the committee has the same authority as county or district governments. The committee is commonly referred to as West Lake and Xixi Scenic Area, West Lake Scenic Area or simply the Scenic Area.

== History ==
Since 1913, the gardens near the West Lake were managed by the Works Bureau of Hangzhou Municipal Government, until the formation of the Garden Management Division in 1948. After the Communist takeover of the city in 1949, to ensure Mao Zedong's safety in Hangzhou, hotels, restaurants, and other service sectors were nationalised and managed by the public relations section of the provincial and municipal police bureaus in 1952.

In 1956, the Garden Management Division was upgraded to the Municipal Bureau of Landscape and Cultural Relics, which administered the whole Xihu District. In 1977, the urban district of Xihu gained independent administration. In 1983, the Municipal Garden Bureau and the Municipal Management Committee of Cultural Relics into the Municipal Bureau of Landscape and Cultural Relics, which managed the gardens around the West Lake within the Xihu district.

In 2002, the Hangzhou Municipal Party Committee and Government restructured the management of the West Lake Scenic Area, Xihu District, and the Hangzhou Zhijiang National Tourist Resort. The Municipal Bureau of Landscape and Cultural Relics was given the new title of West Lake Scenic Area Management Committee, administering a dedicated zone named the West Lake Scenic Area, which consisted of Xihu Subdistrict in Xihu District, Jinsagang Community in Lingyin Subdistrict, and the southern part of Qixialing Community in Beishan Subdistrict (including Gushan, Su Causeway, and Bai Causeway). However, Shanhusha Village, though originally part of Xihu Subdistrict, remained outside this jurisdiction.

In 2014, following city guidelines to separate administrative functions from business operations, the original Canal Conservation Committee (Canal Group) restructured its management system. The Canal Group became a state-owned enterprise directly under city administration, while the Scenic Area expanded its role to serve as the Canal Protection Committee. In 2019, the Hangzhou Garden and Cultural Relics Bureau and the West Lake Scenic Area Management Committee were separated.

In 2020, the committee was entrusted to managing the Xixi National Wetland Park, adding the title of Hangzhou Xixi National Wetland Park Management Committee, which marked the integrated management and protection of West Lake and Xixi Wetland.

== See also ==
- Xihu Subdistrict, Xihu District
- West Lake
- Xixi Wetland
