= Xixi National Wetland Park =

Protected area in Hangzhou, China

- 西溪国家湿地公园
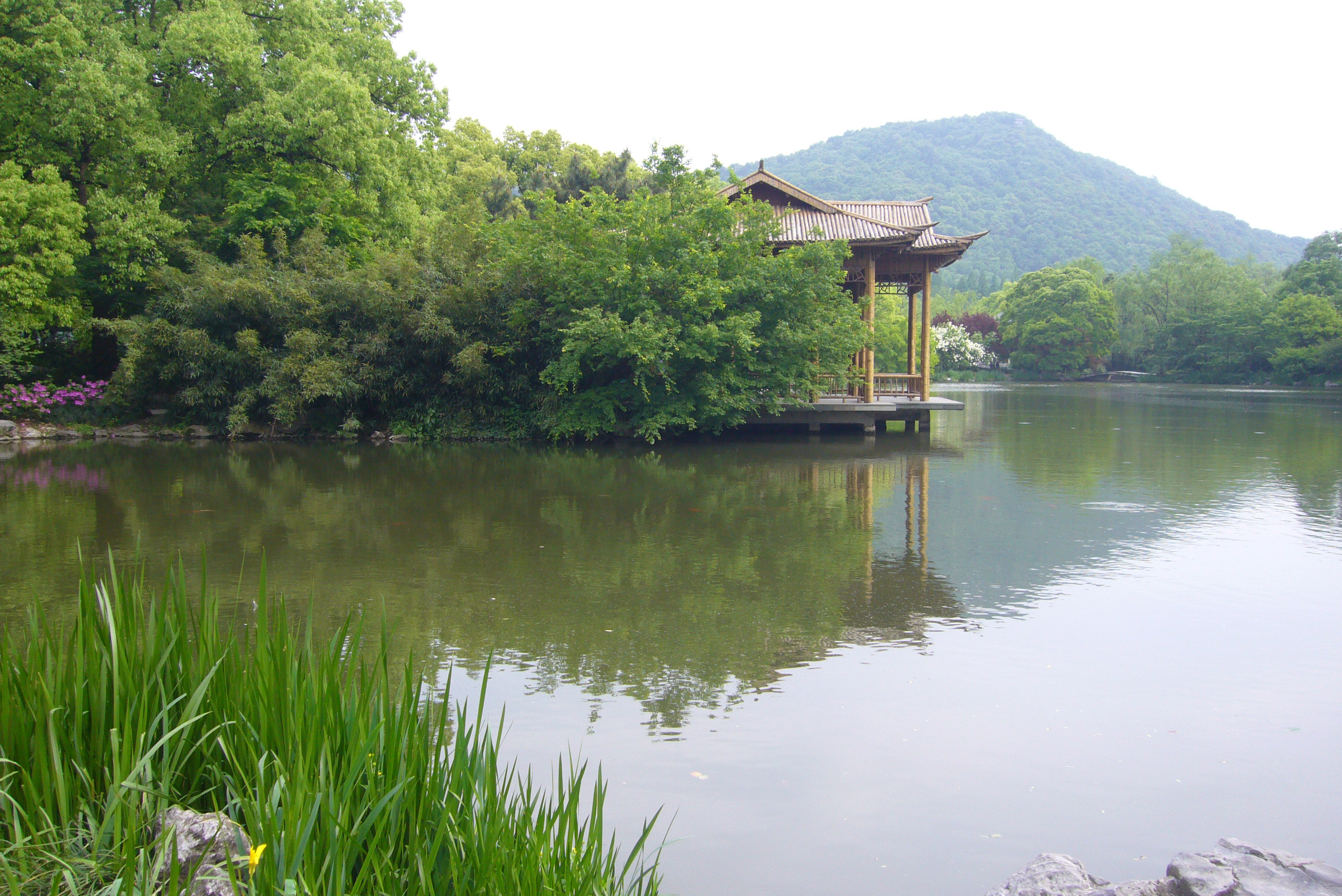
- Xixi National Wetland Park

- Location within China
- Location: Hangzhou, Zhejiang, China
- Coordinates: 30°16′14″N 120°03′45″E
- Area: 1,150 hectares (2,800 acres)
- Established: 2005
- Governing body: Management Committee of Hangzhou Xixi National Wetland Park
- Website: www.xixiwetland.com.cn

Xixi National Wetland Park (Chinese: 西溪国家湿地公园) is a national wetland park in China, located at the western part of Hangzhou, Zhejiang province, and has a total size of 1,150 hectares (2,800 acres). The park consists of six main watercourses, among which are scattered with various ponds, lakes, and swamps.

Xixi Wetland has a history of more than 4,000 years and an abundant cultural heritage. It is the original site of the Chinese South Opera, has a traditional dragon boat contest, and it contains the vivid life of a water village, featuring silkworm feeding and silk production.

== History ==
Xixi Wetland Park has a six-staged history from Liangzhu Culture to the Republic of China.

=== Liangzhu Culture ===
During the Liangzhu Culture period, Xixi Wetland has its starting shape. Much of the land in the Liangzhu Culture period is gone today. The area of Laohe Mountain was also included in Xixi Wetland.

=== Han and Tang dynasties ===
During the Han and Tang dynasties, early settlements started to appear around Xixi Wetland. People named their village "Tang Village". In the Five Dynasty, there were garrisons set around Xixi Wetland.

=== Song and Yuan dynasties ===
During Song and Yuan dynasties, Xixi Wetland had a huge development. In the Southern Song dynasty, the emperor Gaozong Song adored Xixi Wetland and wanted to set it as the capital place. There was a royal river road for Gaozong Song in Xixi Wetland, and transformed to become an important transportation river and a military area.

=== Ming and Qing dynasties ===
The local government started to regulate floods. Citizens fed silkworms on land and faster fish in the river. The beauty of the land and rivers attracted many artists to write poems and paint.

=== Republic of China and People's Republic of China ===
In 2002, Xixi Wetland was assigned to Hangzhou and to Xihu District. With the growth of industrialization, factories also moved in, which caused contamination within the Xixi Wetland. In August 2003, the protection project for Xixi Wetland started to preserve the wildlife and sights in Xixi Wetland, and it became the first national wetland park in China.

== Wildlife ==
Xixi Wetland is honored as "The Green Lung in Paradise". There are 221 species, 182 genera, 85 families of vascular plants, 7 phytoplankton, and 6 vegetation types. There are 2802 old persimmon trees. The bird resources in the wetland are also extremely rich, with 89 species, 12 orders, and 26 families, accounting for nearly 50% of all birds in Hangzhou.

Typical birds are little egrets, wild geese, common kingfishers, mallard ducks, and silver pheasants.

Aquatic animals are carp, chub, shrimp, eel, and crab.

Some of the vegetation includes persimmons, willows, camphors, bamboo trees, mulberries, plums, peaches, elms, nelumbos, maples, poplars, and hibiscuses.
