= Shima station =

Metro station in Hangzhou, China

Shima 石马
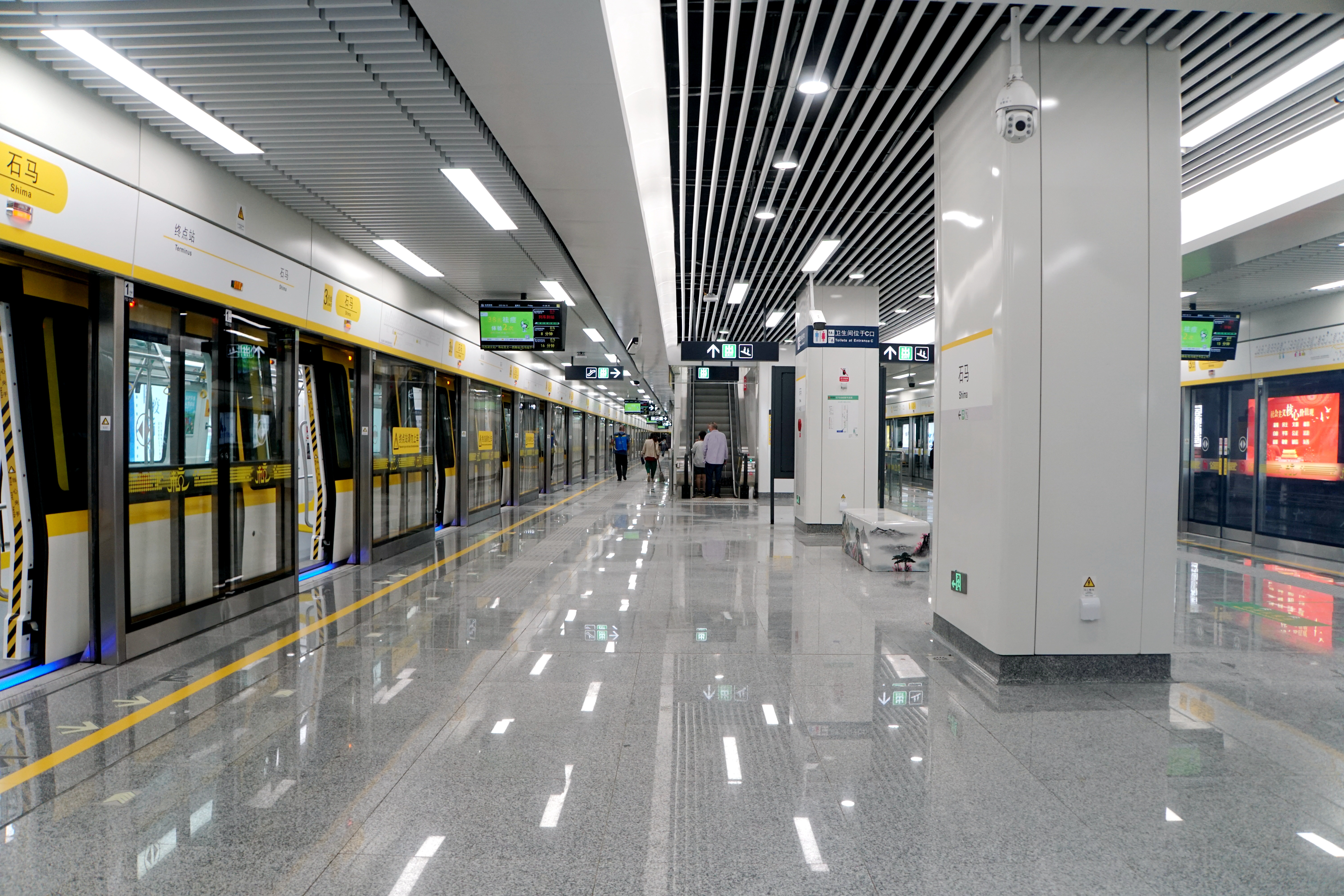
- Platforms

General information
- Location: Lidong Road; Xihu District, Hangzhou, Zhejiang; China
- Coordinates: 30.20927°N 120.0063°E
- System: Hangzhou metro station
- Operator: Hangzhou Metro Corporation
- Line: Line 3
- Platforms: 2 (1 island platform)

Construction
- Structure type: Underground
- Accessible: Yes

History
- Opened: 10 June 2022

Services
Preceding station	Hangzhou Metro	Following station
Terminus	Line 3 Branch	Xiaoheshan towards Xingqiao
Location

Shima (simplified Chinese: 石马; traditional Chinese: 石馬) is a metro station of Line 3 of the Hangzhou Metro in China. It is located in Xihu District of Hangzhou. It is the western terminus of Line 3 branch line.

== Station layout ==
Shima has two levels: a concourse, and an island platform with two tracks for line 3.

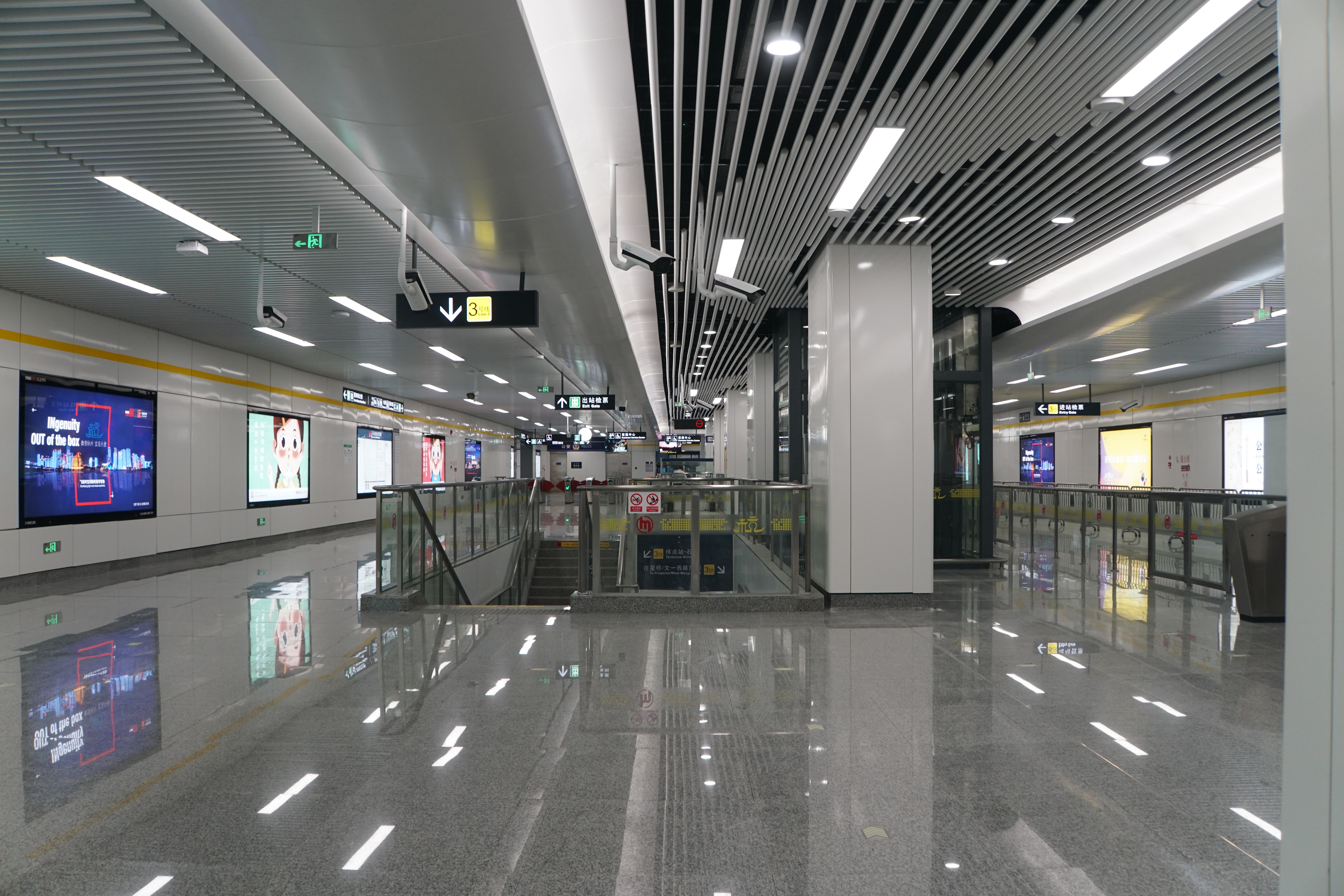
Concourse

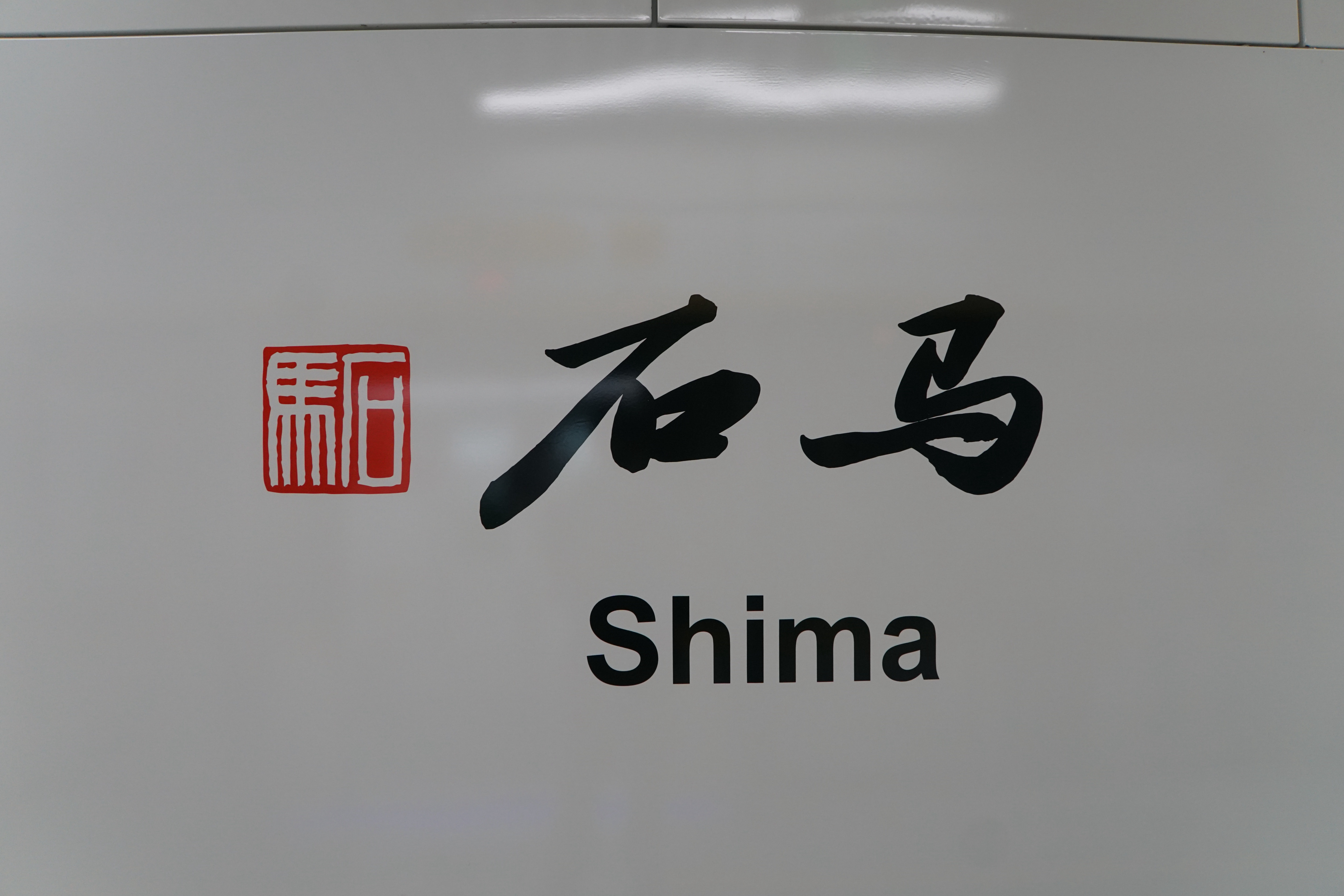
Station name in Chinese calligraphy

== Entrances/exits ==
- A: north side of Lidong Road
- B: north side of Lidong Road
- C: Hangzhou Zhijiang High School
