= Hsu Huan-sheng =

Chinese combat aviator

- 徐煥昇
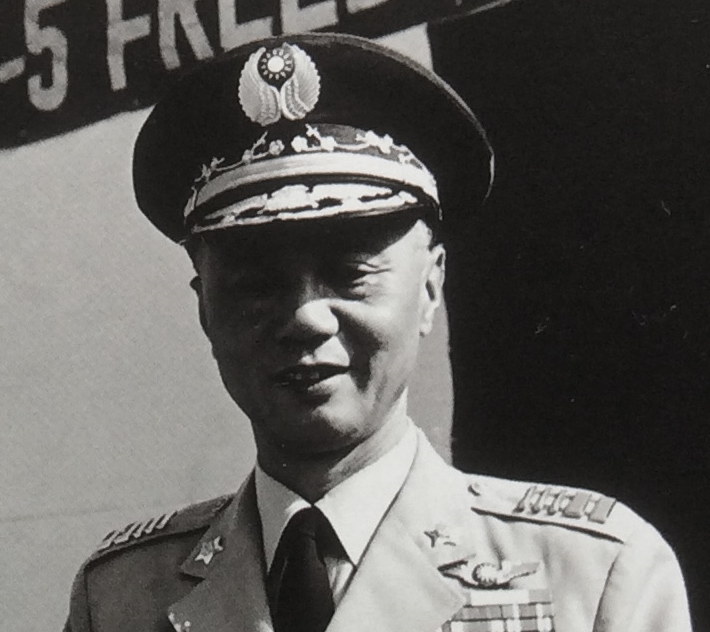
- Hsu in 1965
- Born: Hsu Huan-sheng (Chinese: 徐煥昇); 1906; Chongming, Shanghai, Jiangsu, Qing China
- Died: March 4, 1984 (aged 77–78); Taipei, Taiwan, ROC
- Relatives

Chinese name
- Traditional Chinese: 徐煥昇
- Simplified Chinese: 徐焕升
Transcriptions
Standard Mandarin
- Hanyu Pinyin: Xú Huànshēng
- Bopomofo: ㄒㄩˊ ㄏㄨㄢˋ ㄕㄥ
- Wade–Giles: Hsu² Huʻan⁴-sheng¹
- Military career
- Allegiance: (Taiwan) Republic of China
- Branch: Republic of China Air Force
- Service years: 1926–67
- Rank: General
- Unit: 14th Bomber Squadron, 8th Bomber Group
- Commands: 8th BG
- Conflicts: Second Sino-Japanese War: Battle of Shanghai; Battle of Nanking; Battle of Lanzhou/Northwest

Hsu Huan-sheng (Chinese: 徐煥昇; pinyin: Xú Huànshēng; Wade–Giles: Hsu Huan-sheng; 1906 – March 4, 1984) was a general and combat aviator of the Republic of China Air Force (ROCAF). He was from the first graduating class of the Huangpu (Whampoa) Military Academy's aviation school. Hsu Huan-sheng helped further develop the curriculum at the Central Army Academy Aviation Corps as it transitioned into the Central Aviation Academy based at Jianqiao Airbase, accepting training of officers and new pilots as well as integrating experienced pilots from the various warlord air forces as conflict loomed between China and the Empire of Japan.

Hsu Huan-sheng had pursued advanced studies at the Jiangsu Medical University, aviation academics in Germany and Italy, and then serving as a medical flight officer and pilot training at the Central Aviation Academy. He also served as a pilot for the transport of Generalissimo Chiang Kai-shek. Major General Tang Duo of the PLAAF and General Wang Shuming of the RoCAF were both student-interns along with Hsu Huan-sheng in the inaugural class of military aircraft studies at the site of the Guangzhou Dashatou Aircraft Factory at the Dashatou Aerodrome in 1925, of which Hawaiian-born Sen Yet Young was the founding director.

== Raid over Japan in 1938 ==
In March 1938, then-Captain Hsu Huan-sheng was leading the training at Fenghuangshan Airbase (鳳凰山空軍基地) for a long-range strategic bombing into the Japanese home islands, choosing the Martin B-10 bomber (a.k.a. Model 139W) as the ideal aircraft in the Chinese Air Force inventory to take-on the transoceanic mission; specifically with the targeting of Sasebo Naval Base and Yawata (steel works). As training progressed it was decided that the limited strategic bombing of such targets would be of little value in the effort to stem the Imperial Japanese aggressions and war crimes, and thus it was decided that dropping massive amounts of anti-war leaflets in a humanitarian mission to "raise the conscience of the Japanese people against the atrocities committed by the Imperial Japanese warmongers in China" would be more effective.

On 19 May 1938, Capt. Hsu Huan-sheng and Lt. Tong Yanbo started their long-planned "strategic bombing" mission into Japan with their B-10 bombers of the 14th Bomber Squadron, numbered "1403" and 1404", flying out from Wuhan Wangjiadun Airbase (武漢王家墩空軍基地), and landing at the forward-auxiliary Ningbo Lishe Airbase (寧波櫟社空軍基地) for refueling, before proceeding on the 885 kilometres (550 mi) flight towards southern Japan through inclement weather which cleared up as the Chinese airmen approached the coast of Kyushu, Japan. The Chinese bombers entered the airspace over Nagasaki at 0245, 20 May 1938, without any response from Japanese defenses, reducing altitude and dropping a flare bomb to help with the payload release, and starting their "bombing" of Nagasaki before splitting up and proceeding to other civilian centers including Fukuoka, Saga, among other cities, reconnoitering Japanese commercial, military and industrial assets. The Japanese defenses in Nagasaki eventually determined the intrusion and blacked-out the lights in the city, nonetheless, a clear moonlight provided good illumination for the Chinese aircrews of the landscape and terrain below. The two B-10 bombers rendezvoused at 0332 and reconnoitered for another half-hour before proceeding back to mainland China. As scheduled, radio direction finding signals for Capt. Hsu and Lt. Tong were starting transmission from Changsha and Hankou at 0452 and 0550 respectively, and at 0712 the Chinese bombers were flying over Sanmenwan off the coast of Zhejiang when Imperial Japanese warships moored below started firing Anti-aircraft artillery at the Chinese B-10s, without any effect. The two bombers reaching separate refueling points: B-10 #1404 landed at Yushan Airbase (玉山空軍基地) at 0848 and B-10 #1403 landed at Qingyunpu Airbase (青雲譜空軍基地) at 0932; both Capt. Hsu and Lt. Tong and their crews returned to Wangjiadun Airbase by midday, where they were greeted with fanfare by top dignitaries including Premier Kung Hsiang-hsi and chief CCP-KMT liaison Zhou Enlai. It is said that Hsu Huan-sheng was featured among the "12 most notable aviators" in a 1944 issue of Life magazine, and in it he is described as the first man who led an air raid on Japan, before Doolittle.

== See also ==
- Air Warfare of WWII from the Sino-Japanese War perspective
- Aircraft inventory of China both civil and military use from 1937 and before
- Development of the Nationalist Air Force of China during the War of Resistance-World War II; the combined effort of overseas Chinese volunteer pilots and former warlord air force units joining the central authority of the Republic of China Air Force for the unified effort in the War of Resistance/World War II against the Imperial Japanese invasion and occupation from 1937 to 1945
