= Central Aircraft Manufacturing Company =

Former Chinese aircraft manufacturer

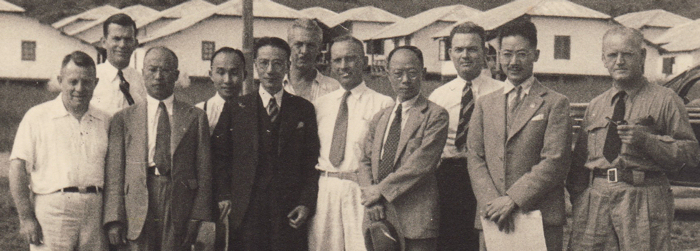
CAMCO personnel, in a photo taken at the Loiwing factory's opening in 1939. William Pawley is second from the left, at the rear; CAMCO employee Moon Chen, to the right of Pawley at the rear; Eugene Pawley at the rear between an unidentified Chinese man and C. F. Wang of the C.O.A.A; at the end Charles Hunter, general manager of CAMCO to the right of C. F. Wang.

The Central Aircraft Manufacturing Company (CAMCO; Chinese: 中央飛機製造廠), also known as the Loiwing Factory (雷允飛機製造廠) after they moved to Yunnan, was a Chinese aircraft manufacturer established by American entrepreneur William D. Pawley in the 1930s.

== History ==
Starting in 1933, CAMCO assembled (probably from factory-supplied kits) about 100 Curtiss Hawk II and Hawk III fighter-bombers, and 25 Northrop Gamma 2E attack-bombers in a factory at Hangzhou Jianqiao Airport. The planes had originally been designed as scout bombers for the United States Navy. They served as the backbone of the Chinese Air Force during the first year of the Second Sino-Japanese War. Former Boeing engineer Wang Zhu served as chief of engineering in CAMCO from 1934–37.

As Nationalist Chinese forces were driven back from the coast in the winter of 1937–38, CAMCO retreated with them. Pawley's factory was reconstituted in Hankou under the direction of Bruce Gardner Leighton, who acted as general manager between 1937–1939. The new site repaired airplanes damaged in combat or by bombing, and may also have assembled some later-model Curtiss H-75 fighters, an export version of the U.S. Army's P-36 monoplane fighter. When Hankou fell in October 1938, CAMCO moved to Hengyang and added Vultee V-11 light bombers to its product line. At the same time, work was started at a new factory far in the interior, at Loiwing on the China-Burma frontier. Opened in the spring of 1939, it was supplied by the mountainous Burma Road from Rangoon (now Yangon). The factory was financed by the Nationalist government in Chongqing. An undetermined number of Hawk 75 (P-36 type) and Curtiss-Wright CW-21 fighters were assembled there.

In the winter of 1940–1941, Pawley became involved in the recruitment and supplying of the 1st American Volunteer Group (AVG), later known as the Flying Tigers. AVG pilots were released from American military service to serve as "instructors" or "Metal Workers" for the Chinese; their employer of record was CAMCO, which also set up a facility at Mingaladon airport outside Rangoon to assemble the 100 Curtiss P-40 fighters sold to China to equip the AVG. From offices in Rangoon and New York City, CAMCO also provided housekeeping and record-keeping services for the AVG until its disbandment in July 1942.

The CAMCO factory at Loiwing was used to repair AVG P-40s, and its airfield was briefly used by the AVG to mount raids into Thailand and Burma. Following the Allied retreat from Burma in the spring of 1942, the CAMCO plant was lost to the Japanese, and Pawley moved his operation to Bangalore, India, where he evidently joined forces with an Indian firm, Hindustan Aircraft Ltd. Here he assembled Harlow trainers for the Indian Air Force and arguably launched Bangalore on its 20th century path as the high-tech centre on the subcontinent.

== See also ==
- Aircraft in China both civil and military use from 1937 and before
- Development of Chinese Nationalist air force (1937–1945)
- National Aerospace Laboratories
- Mahindra Aerospace
