= Schoettler I =

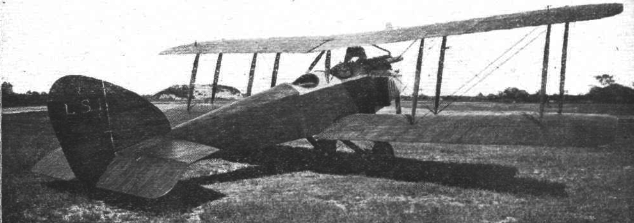

General information
- Type: Two seat biplane
- National origin: China
- Designer: Ferdinand Schoettler; Ernst Fuetterer

History
- First flight: Summer 1923

The Schoettler I was one of the first aircraft constructed in China, albeit with a German designer. It was a two-seat, single engine biplane, first flown in mid-summer 1923.

== Design and development ==
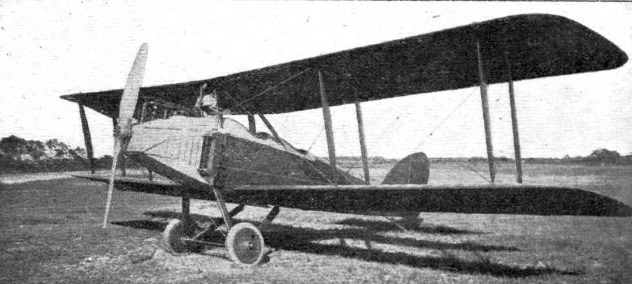
Schoettler 1 in 1923

The aircraft was designed by the German engineers Ferdinand Schoettler and Ernst Fuetterer and built at Longhua, Shanghai. The only major components imported from Europe were the engine, instruments, wheels and dope for the fabric covering; everything else was locally produced from local materials by workers without aviation experience or modern machinery. Work on it began in the summer of 1922.

The Schoettler I was a conventional European style two seat tractor biplane, rather similar to the German Aviatik B.II and Albatros B.II designs, with equal span two bay wings. These were mounted with 2° of dihedral and 597 mm, almost 2 ft, of stagger. The gap between the upper and lower planes was 1,676 mm (66 in), maintained by parallel pairs of aerofoil section struts and wire bracing. The unswept wings had a constant chord of 1,600 mm (63 in) with blunt wing tips and ailerons on both upper and lower planes. The Schoettler's empennage was also conventional.

The fuselage was likewise a standard rectangular section wooden girder structure, fabric covered except around the engine and a wood upper decking around the open, tandem cockpits for pilot and for the observer, who sat under the wing trailing edge. It tapered to a knife-edge at the tail. At the front the 160 hp (119 kW) Mercedes water-cooled upright inline engine was enclosed in a rectangular cross-section metal cowling which tapered vertically, exposing the upper cylinders, to a two blade propeller. At the rear of the housing an external radiator, with shutters for engine temperature control, projected on each side. The Schoettler had a conventional fixed undercarriage, with the mainwheels on a rigid axle mounted on V-struts.

The date of the first flight is unknown, but this was on or before 23 July 1923 when the Schoettler was test flown by ex-RAF pilot W. E. B. Holland. The latter reported good handling and an excellent, 360°, field of view for the observer noting the aircraft's potential for development. More recent articles claim the first flight by a Chinese built aircraft was that of the indigenously-designed Xianyi Rosamonde (or Dashatou Rosamonde) on 12 July 1923, though without mention of the Schoettler; the two aircraft were evidently close contemporaries.

== Specifications ==
Data from Flight, 1 November 1923

General characteristics

- Capacity: Two
- Length: 27 ft 4.75 in (8.3503 m)
- Wingspan: 39 ft 6 in (12.04 m)
- Height: 10 ft 3 in (3.12 m)
- Wing area: 401.75 sq ft (37.324 m^{2})
- Empty weight: 1,634 lb (741 kg)
- Gross weight: 2,558 lb (1,160 kg)
- Powerplant: 1 × Mercedes water-cooled engine, 160 hp (120 kW)
- Propellers: 2-bladed

Performance

- Maximum speed: 128 mph (206 km/h, 111 kn) at 1,000 ft (305 m)
- Cruise speed: 98 mph (158 km/h, 85 kn)
- Stall speed: 45 mph (72 km/h, 39 kn)
- Endurance: 4.5 h
- Wing loading: 6.3 lb/sq ft (31 kg/m^{2})
- Power/mass: 0.063 hp/lb (103 W/kg)

== See also ==
- Feng Ru, Chinese-American who constructed and demonstrated an aircraft of his own design in China from 1911 to 1912
