= Air Force (National Revolutionary Army) =

- 空軍
- Flag of the Aviation Affairs Commission (1937-1948)
- Active: 1920 – 1947
- Country: China
- Allegiance: Kuomintang
- Type: Air force (de facto army aviation)
- Role: Aerial warfare
- Part of: National Revolutionary Army
- Engagements: Chinese Civil War; Second Sino-Japanese War; World War II

Commanders
- Notable commanders: Chou Rhi-Rou; Mao Bang-chu; Wang Shuming; Claire Lee Chennault

Insignia
- Roundel

- Fin Flash
- Headquarters: Canton (1920–1928); Nanking (1928–1934 and 1936-1937); Nanchang (1934-1936); Hankow (1937-1938); Kweiyang (1938-1940); Chengtu (1940-1946)

The Air Force (Chinese: 空軍), functioned as the military aviation branch associated de jure with the National Revolutionary Army (NRA) of the National Government of the Republic of China.

While administratively a subordinate entity under the Aviation Affairs Commission (Chinese: 航空委員會), which itself formed part of the overarching Military Affairs Commission, the Air Force operated with significant autonomy and was, in practice, regarded as a near-independent service branch. Although there was no formal designation such as "Republic of China Air Force" (Chinese: 中華民國空軍) or "National Revolutionary Army Air Force" (Chinese: 國民革命軍空軍) during this period, the force was universally known by its official name: the Air Force.

The Command Post of the Air Force (Chinese: 空軍指揮部), whose commanding position—titled Commander of the Air Force (Chinese: 空軍總指揮)—was staffed by an army general rather than an officer from a separate air branch. No unique air marshal rank or parallel command hierarchy existed, underscoring its theoretical status as a subset of the NRA.

== Etymology ==
The term Command Post of the Air Force (Chinese: 空軍指揮部) stems from the organisational framework of the Republic of China, wherein air force operations were treated as a command-level component within the General Headquarters of the National Revolutionary Army. This structural arrangement persisted until the post-1947 reorganisation that formally established the Republic of China Air Force as an independent military service.

Despite its embedded position within the Military Affairs Commission, the Air Force operated with increasing independence in both operations and doctrine during the 1930s and 1940s. To most civilians of the era, the Air Force was perceived as one of the three principal service branches, alongside the army and navy.

As the Aviation Affairs Commission was the de facto administrative body responsible for overseeing the operations of the Air Force, the term Aviation Affairs Commission Air Force (Chinese: 航空委員會空軍) came into common use among historians in Taiwan, as well as among overseas Chinese and other pro-Nationalist communities. In Western historical literature, the force is often referred to as the Chinese Nationalist Air Force, a term used to distinguish it from the later Communist air force. Meanwhile, in the People’s Republic of China, the same force is typically labelled the Kuomintang Air Force (Chinese: 国民党空军), reflecting a post-1949 political and ideological framing.

== History ==
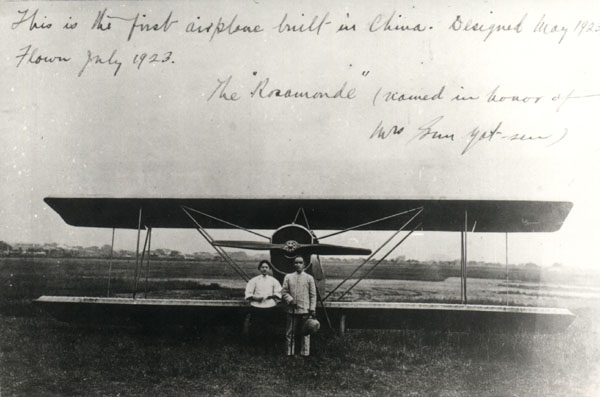
The Rosamonde biplane, the first indigenously designed and made military aircraft in China shown here with Soong Qingling and Sun Yat-sen; Soong would fly as a passenger in the plane with pilot Huang Guangrui at the controls

On 29 November 1920, the Chinese Nationalist Party (KMT) established the "Aviation Department". Starting with four Curtiss JN Jenny training aircraft, the "Aviation Department" gave nationalist faction troops an aviation element during the Constitutional Protection Movement led by the party leader Sun Yat-sen.

The "Aviation Department" was reformed into "Aviation Ministry" on 1 November 1928 within the National Revolutionary Army commanding structure, and later on 17 August 1933, the "Aviation Ministry" was expanded as the Aviation Affairs Commission (Chinese: 航空委員會) directly under the Military Affairs Commission. The "Command Post of the Air Force" served as the executive body of the Aviation Affairs Commission.

Ironically, the Aviation Affairs Commission wielded far greater authority than most army aviation branches in other countries at the time, as in practice, until 1947 the Aviation Affairs Commission was responsible not only for the majority of Nationalist Chinese military aviation, but also for all air traffic control, as well as the issuance of licenses and certifications for civilian pilots and related professionals within nationalist China. The only exceptions were those aircraft operated by the Republic of China Navy, include the two Aichi AB-3 floatplanes onboard Light Cruiser CNS Ning Hai.

The Air Force also maintained a distinctive identity, with uniforms markedly different from those of the NRA's ground forces and a separate administrative system. In terms of pay and provisions, Air Force personnel enjoyed treatment on par with the NRA's most trusted ground units—far superior to that of the majority of other NRA ground formations at the time.

== Operations ==
=== Chinese Civil War ===
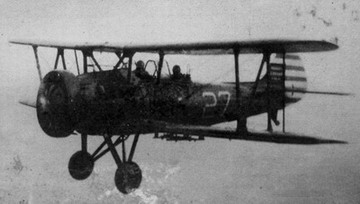
A Vought O2U Corsair observation aircraft, flown by the Chinese Nationalist Air Force. Such type of aircraft had been modified by local Chinese engineers as light bombers, and had been used extensively during anti-communist military operations between 1929 and 1934.

During the civil war between the nationalist faction and the communist faction, the air force had been actively supporting the nationalist army and other pro-nationalist troops on the ground, particularly during the final encirclement campaign against the communist stronghold.

=== A Unified Chinese Nationalist Air Force ===
As tensions escalated between China and Imperial Japan during the 1930s, air units from various Chinese warlord factions, including the Guangdong Provincial Air Force and squadrons manned by overseas Chinese aviators, were gradually integrated into the centralised command of the Chinese Nationalist Air Force. This consolidation was driven by the urgent need to present a unified front in response to the Japanese invasion and occupation.

During the January 28 Incident of 1932, the Air Force deployed combat aircraft to Hungchiao Aerodrome near Shanghai, leading to the first recorded aerial engagements between Chinese and Imperial Japanese forces. In February of that year, U.S. Reserve Lieutenant Robert McCawley Short, who was ferrying armed aircraft for the Chinese, engaged Japanese aircraft in combat. On February 19, he successfully shot down an Imperial Japanese Navy (IJN) aircraft, and on February 22, he downed another before being killed in action. In recognition of his bravery, he was posthumously promoted to the rank of colonel in the Chinese Nationalist Air Force.

Among the warlord factions, the Guangxi Clique was the last to join the centralised air force command, formally integrating in November 1937. Under the enduring leadership of Generals Li Zongren and Bai Chongxi, now serving within the Kuomintang (KMT) framework, the Guangxi airmen distinguished themselves in the critical Battle of Taierzhuang, earning honorable recognition for their contributions to one of China's early battlefield victories.

=== Early Stages of the Second Sino-Japanese War ===
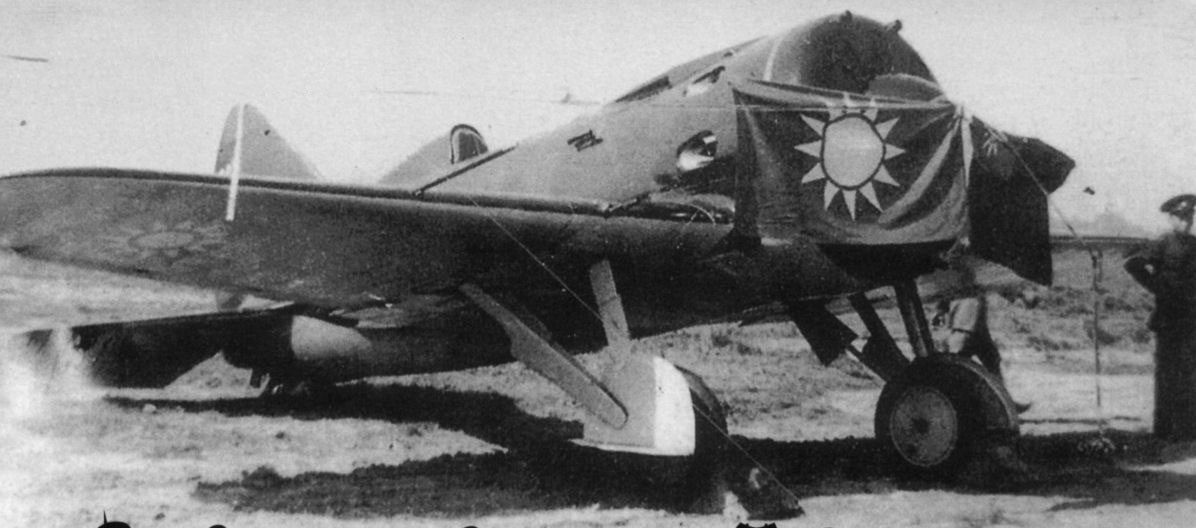
A Soviet-made Polikarpov I-16 with Chinese insignia. The I-16 was the main fighter plane used by the Chinese Air Force and Soviet volunteers following the Sino-Soviet Treaty of 1937

During the early stages of the Second Sino-Japanese War (1937–1945), the Chinese Nationalist Air Force played a key role in the defense against Japanese aggression, conducting attacks on Japanese warships along the eastern front and the Yangtze river, as well as providing interdiction and close-air support during the Battle of Shanghai in 1937.

At the onset of full-scale hostilities, Chinese sources estimated that Japan could deploy approximately 600 aircraft (from a total inventory of 1,530) against China's 230 combat-ready aircraft. On August 14, 1937, Chinese Hawk III fighters intercepted Imperial Japanese Navy bomber aircraft, operated by Kisarazu Air Group targeting Chienchiao Airbase, on that day Chinese Hawk III shot down two Mitsubishi G3M aircraft, with another two G3M aircraft damaged beyond repair on return to base, while losing one Hawk III of its own, marking the beginning of a series of major air battles. "814" or "14th of August" had thus become regarded as the "Firing Baptism" (Chinese: 空軍節) of the Chinese Nationalist air force, and later the Republic of China (Taiwan) Air Force.

Chinese frontline fighters at the time included the Curtiss Hawk II, Hawk III—some license-built locally by CAMCO—as well as the Boeing P-26C/Model 281 and Fiat CR.32. In one of the world's earliest aerial dogfights between all-metal monoplane fighters, Nationalist Chinese P-26s engaged Japanese Mitsubishi A5M over Nanking.

Amid escalating Japanese aerial terror bombing campaigns targeting both military and civilian areas, on 19 May 1938, the Chinese Air Force also planned a daring psychological warfare operation targeting the Japanese home islands, using two Martin B-10 bomber aircraft, led by Captain Hsu Huang-Sheng to carry out a leaflet-dropping mission across the sea, over the Japanese cities of Nagasaki, Saga, Fukuoka, —one of the earliest Chinese efforts to confront Japan on its own territory through aerial means.

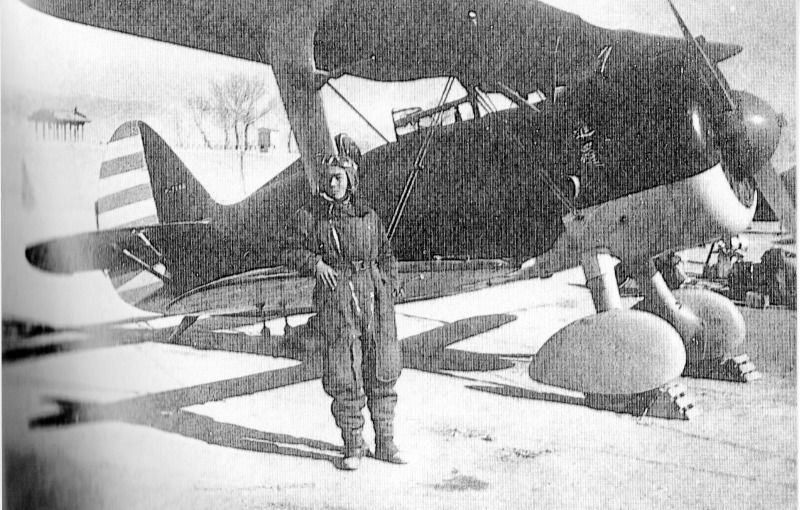
Xu Jixiang of the 17th PS, 5th PG, fought against all odds in the debut dogfight against the A6M Zero-fighter, shown here with an I-15bis,

The War then rapidly became a war of attrition for the Nationalist Air Force, which suffered heavy personnel and equipment losses in the early stages. Many of its most experienced ace pilots—including Lieutenant Liu Tsui-kang, Colonel Kao Chih-hang, and Yüeh I-ch'in—were killed in action within the first year of the conflict. At the start of the war in 1937, China's front-line aircraft, such as the Curtiss Hawk II/III and Boeing P-26C, were quickly rendered obsolete by more advanced Japanese aircraft. Within six months, the Chinese Air Force began receiving Polikarpov I-15 and Polikarpov I-16 fighters through the Sino-Soviet Non-Aggression Pact, along with the arrival of Soviet volunteer pilots, which temporarily stabilised air operations from 1937 to 1939.

Despite these reinforcements, the air force faced growing disadvantages. The fall of Shanghai, Nanking, and Taiyuan in 1937, followed by defeats at Wuchang and South Guangxi, severely undermined China's strategic depth and logistical supply lines—particularly the availability of high-octane aviation fuel, which was crucial for maintaining combat effectiveness. In contrast, Imperial Japan not only had unrestricted access to such fuel, but also benefited from a sophisticated aviation industry capable of producing faster, more agile, and heavily armed aircraft.

Code-breaking operations also played a key role in the Japanese air campaign. An Imperial Japanese naval signals unit, including IJN Lt. Commander Tsunezo Wachi and codebreaking expert Lt. Yamada, was attached to the landing forces at Shanghai. Their interception of Chinese communications allowed for several preemptive strikes on Chinese airfields, contributing to the early losses suffered by the Nationalist Air Force.

After the Battle of Wuhan in October 1938, Chinese air force units were largely withdrawn to the Szechwan hinterland, where they assumed a defensive role against an increasingly intense Japanese terror bombing campaign. Operations "100" and "101", launched by the Japanese, were among the most brutal aerial carpet-bombing raids inflicted upon civilian populations up to that time. These raids targeted Chungking and surrounding areas and were fiercely resisted by remaining Chinese fighter units and anti-aircraft artillery, occasionally inflicting meaningful losses on the attacking forces.

However, China's lack of aviation-industrial infrastructure meant it could not replace losses or match the rapid pace of Japanese technological advancement. As the war dragged on, Chinese aircraft, hampered by poor fuel quality and outdated performance, struggled against increasingly superior Japanese fighters. The introduction of the Mitsubishi A6M "Zero" in 1940–41—then the most advanced carrier-based fighter in the world—granted Japan near-total air superiority by 1941. This overwhelming aerial dominance contributed to the Japanese high command's confidence in launching Operation Z, the strategic plan that culminated in the Attack on Pearl Harbor.

Meanwhile, the Chinese Nationalist Air Force underwent internal reorganisation. By the end of the 1930s, it was restructured into seven groups, one independent squadron, and four foreign volunteer groups. After the Soviet Union signed a non-aggression pact with Germany with Nazi Germany in 1939, the Soviet Volunteer Group was withdrawn, leaving China increasingly isolated in its air war against Japan until the entry of the United States into the conflict following Pearl Harbor.

=== World War II ===
Following the Japanese invasion of French Indochina in 1940, the United States responded by imposing an embargo on oil, steel, and other strategic materials, effectively cutting off Japan's access to critical war resources. In tandem, the Lend-Lease Act was enacted on 11 March 1941, with China designated as a recipient just four days later, on 15 March. The Nationalist government promptly submitted a request for 1,000 aircraft to bolster its resistance against Japanese aggression.

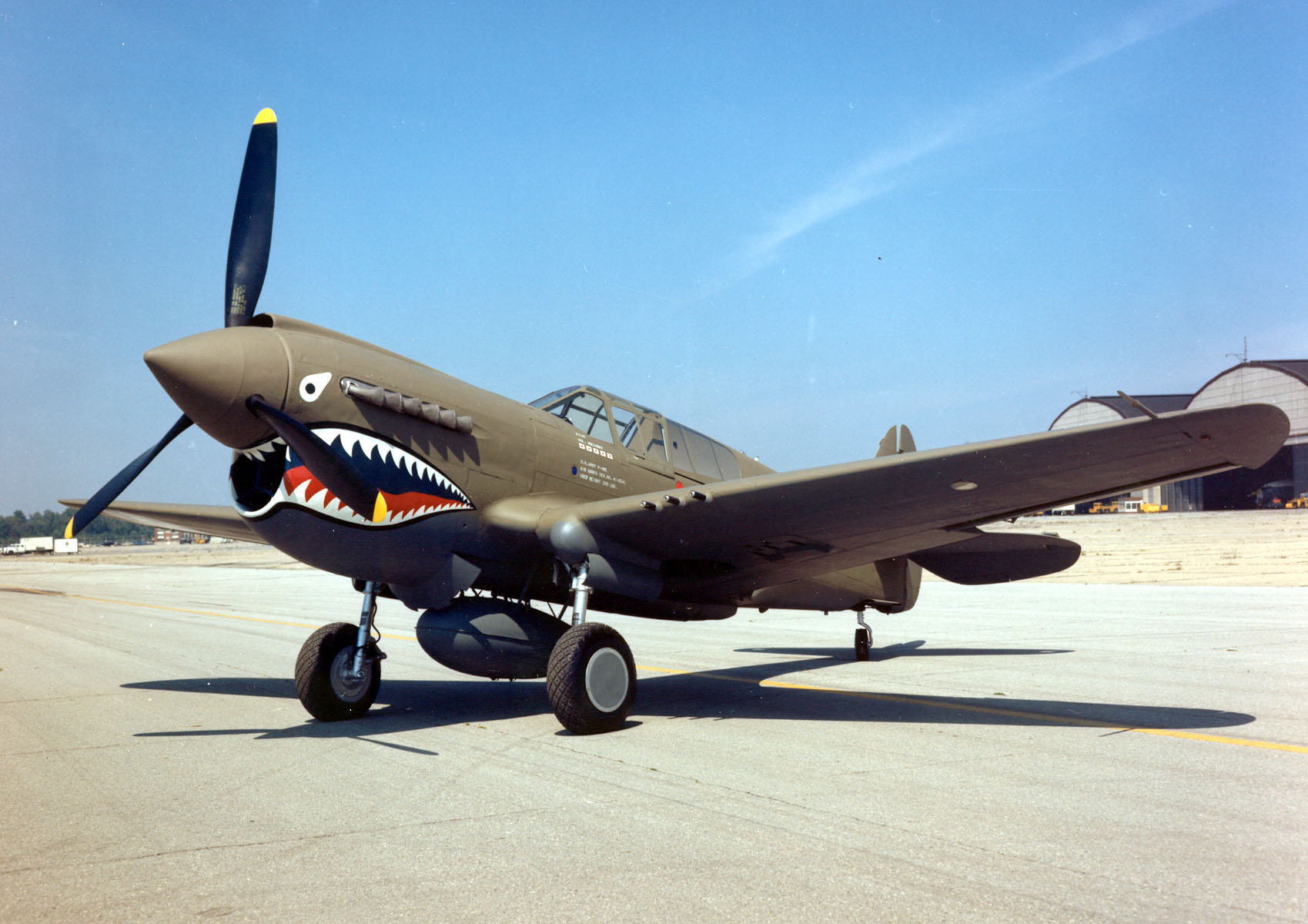
American P-40E Warhawk decorated with the famous sharkmouth nose art of the AVG

One of the most visible results of this increased American involvement was the establishment of the American Volunteer Group (AVG), famously known as the "Flying Tigers". Equipped with rugged and heavily armed Curtiss P-40 Warhawk fighters, the AVG adopted hit-and-run tactics that proved highly effective against superior Japanese numbers. Their chief responsibility was to defend Allied supply routes into China, most notably the aerial supply corridor over the Himalayas, dubbed "The Hump", connecting Kunming in Yunnan with British bases in India.

At the same time, the Chinese Nationalist air force, which had been devastated in the early years of the war, commenced a concerted process of rebuilding and modernisation, now backed by increasing American military and logistical support following the attack on Pearl Harbor in December 1941.

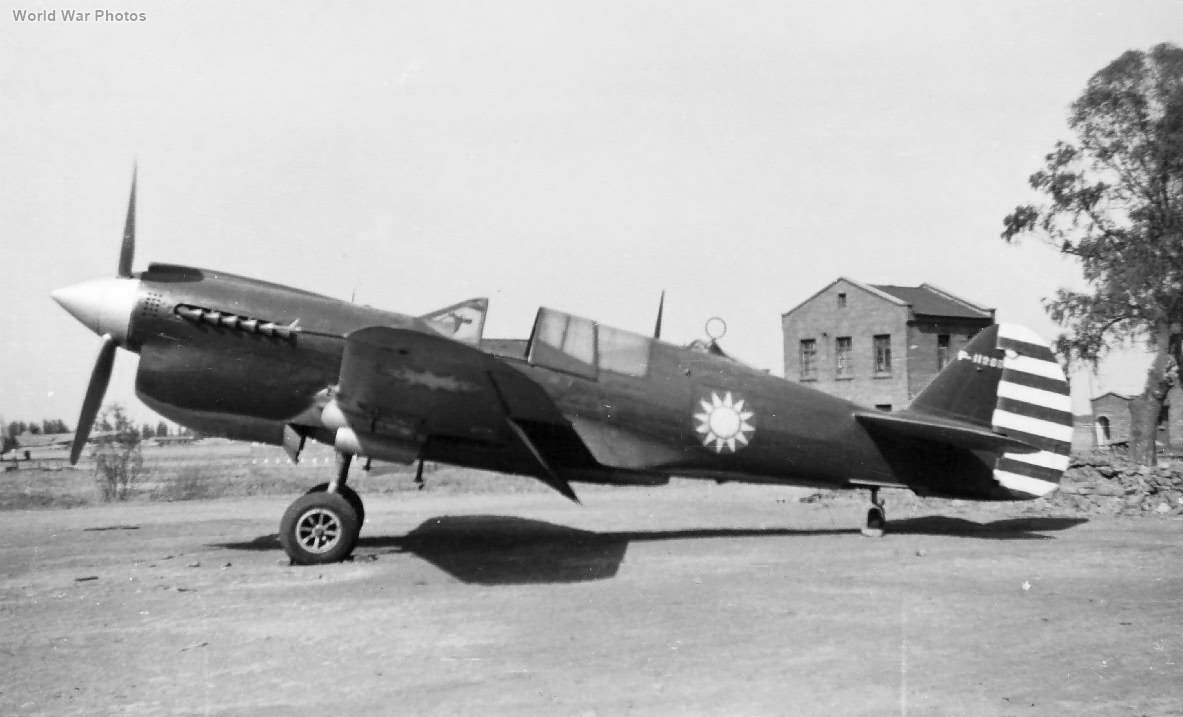
Curtiss P-40N Kitty Hawk pursuit aircraft, operated by the Chinese Nationalist air force during the latter stages of the Second Sino-Japanese War

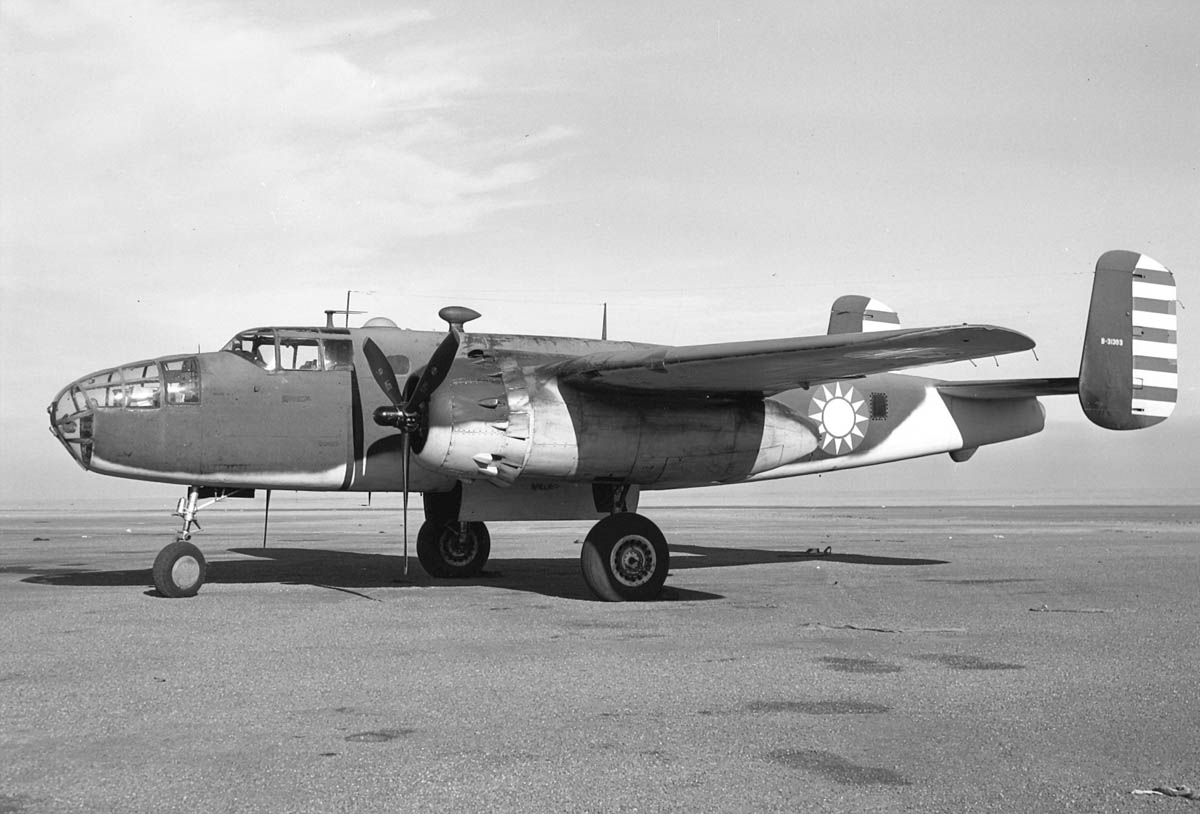
B-25 Mitchell bomber aircraft, operated by the Chinese Nationalist air force during the latter stages of the Second Sino-Japanese War

By the end of 1941, the Nationalist air force was reduced to just 364 operational aircraft, including up to 100 P-40Bs operated by the AVG. The remainder were mostly obsolete or unserviceable. From March 1942, however, the U.S. began delivering additional aircraft under Lend-Lease, including A-29 Hudsons, P-43 Lancers, and further batches of P-40s, gradually restoring combat capability to Chinese units.

From 1944 onward, Sino-American air cooperation advanced further with the establishment of the Chinese-American Composite Wing (CACW). This joint unit combined personnel from the U.S. Army Air Forces' Fourteenth Air Force with Chinese pilots, operating modern aircraft and conducting coordinated combat missions. The CACW represented the apex of joint Sino-American air power during the war and was instrumental in gaining local air superiority over Japanese forces in the China Theatre.

=== Combat Record (1937-1945) ===
During the eight years of the Second Sino-Japanese War, the Chinese Nationalist air force sustained heavy losses and made significant contributions to the war effort. According to wartime records, the air force lost:

- A total of 2,468 aircraft, including those destroyed during training accidents;
- 6,164 officers and enlisted were killed in action, of whom 661 were aviators.

In the 4,027 combat or non-combat missions, Nationalist Chinese aircraft undertook 21,597 sorties, encompassing bombing, fighter interception, reconnaissance, and transport sorties. During these engagements, Nationalist Chinese aviators reportedly:

- in aerial combat, shot down 599 enemy aircraft;
- in aerial combat, damaged an additional 110 enemy aircraft;
- destroyed 627 aircraft on the ground;
- damaged 120 more in airfield bombing runs.

These efforts were carried out under extremely difficult logistical and technological conditions, with the Chinese Nationalist air force facing severe shortages of equipment, trained personnel, and fuel throughout much of the conflict. Nonetheless, the air force's persistence played a vital role in maintaining the morale of Nationalist China and inflicting tangible losses on Japanese forces in both the air and on the ground.

=== Transformation into the R.O.C Air Force ===
On 16 August 1946, the "Aviation Affairs Commission" was reorganised as the "Air Force General Headquarters" in the Ministry of National Defense of the Republic of China, and the service was officially given the name Republic of China Air Force (Chinese: 中華民國空軍).

== Formation of the Chinese Nationalist Air Force 1937–1945 ==
=== Bomber Units ===
- 1st Group

Northrop Gamma 2E, Northrop A-17 - Before the War
Tupolev ANT 40 SB III, VI - After 1938
North American B-25 Mitchell - After 1940

- 2nd Group

Northrop Gamma 2E, Northrop A-17
20 × Vultee A-19, - 14th International Volunteer Squadron
3 × Martin B-10 - 14th International Volunteer Squadron
20 × Fiat BR.3 - 30th Squadron
8 × Avro 627 - China built domestically as scout-bombers at Guangxi
Tupolev ANT 40 SB III - After 1938
19 × Lockheed A-29 Hudson - After 1940

- 8th Group

2 × Northrop Alpha 4 - converted locally to scout-bombers
10 × Savoia-Marchetti S.72, 6 × Caproni Ca.111 - 10th Squadron
6 × Heinkel He 111 - 19th Squadron
6 × Martin B-10- 30th Squadron
30 × Ilyushin DB-3 - After 1938
6 × Tupolev TB-3 - 19th Squadron, After 1938
North American B-25 Mitchell - After 1940

- Independent 13th Squadron (bombers & transports)

3 × Savoia-Marchetti SM.81, 1 × Spartan Executive Model 7W - lost on Dec 12, 1937.

- Soviet Volunteer Group (bombers)

Ilyushin DB-3
Polikarpov R-5 - Scout-bombers

=== Ground Attack, Light Bombers and Scout-Bombers Units ===
- 6th Group

21 × Vought O3U/V-92C, Douglas O-2MC

- 7th Group

42 × Vought O2U Corsair, Douglas O-2MC
10 × Henschel Hs 123 - 15th Squadron (dive bombers)
9 × Lockheed P-38/F-5 - 12th Squadron (Reconnaissance), After 1944

- 9th Group

20 × Curtiss A-12 Shrike - 26th Squadron and 27th Squadron
9 × Bellanca 28-90B - 27th Squadron

- 12th Group

4 × Vultee A-19 - 10th Squadron

- Independent 18th Squadron

Caproni Ca.101 and Douglas O-2MC -originally stationed at Guangdong, later converted to pursuit squadron with Curtiss Hawk 75M.

- Provisional 34th Squadron

14 Armstrong Whitworth Atlas, 6 Westland Wapiti, Mitsubishi Type 92.

=== Pursuit Units ===
- 3rd Group

Fiat CR.30, 9 × Avro 626
9 × Fiat CR.32 - 8th Squadron
11 × Boeing Type 281- 17th Squadron
36 × Gloster Gladiator Mk-1 - After 1938 with 28th Squadron, 29th Squadron, and 32nd Squadron
Polikarpov E.15bis - After 1938
Polikarpov E.15ter (E.15III, E.153) - After 1938
Polikarpov E.16 - After 1938
Curtiss P-36 Hawk - After 1939
Vultee P-66 Vanguard - After 1941
Curtiss P-40E/N - After 1942
North American P-51C/D/K - From 1945

- 4th Group

9 × Curtiss 68C Hawk II (F11C-3) - 22nd Squadron
Curtiss Hawk III
Polikarpov E.15bis - After 1938
Polikarpov E.15ter (E.15III, E.153) - After 1938
Polikarpov E.16 - After 1938
Curtiss P-40E/N - After 1942
41 × Republic P-43 Lancer - After 1942

- 5th Group

12 × Dewoitine D.510 - 17th Squadron
49 × Curtiss Hawk-II (F11C-2) - 28th Squadron
Polikarpov E.15bis - After 1938
Polikarpov E.15ter (E.15III, E.153) - After 1938
P-66 Vanguard - After 1941
Curtiss P-40E/N - After 1942
North American P-51C/D/K - From 1945

- 11th Group

Curtiss P-40N - After 1942

- Independent 29th Squadron

6 × Breda Ba.27

- Provisional 32nd Squadron

Nakajima Type 91

- 41st French Volunteer Squadron

6 × Dewoitine D.510

- Soviet Volunteer Group (Pursuit)

Polikarpov E.15bis
Polikarpov E.15ter (E.15III, E.153)
Polikarpov E.16

- American Volunteer Group 'Flying Tigers'

Curtiss P-40B, Curtiss P-40E

=== Training Units ===
- Central Aviation School

16 × Armstrong Whitworth A.W.16 - also used as fighters in the early stage of the Second Sino-Japanese War.
20 × Focke-Wulf Fw 44 - of various units
>17 × de Havilland Gipsy Moth - of various units,
(another 13 seaplane versions was with the Chinese Navy, All lost by the end of 1937.)

- Provisional Air Cadet Flying School

Curtiss 68C Hawk II (F11C-3)

- Loyang Aviation School

Breda Ba.25, Ba.28

- Liuchow Aviation School

Around 20 × Avro Avian (616 IVM), 6 × Avro Cadet, 5 × Avro Tutor, 7 × Nakajima Ko-4 (Japanese license produced Nieuport-Delage NiD 29 C.1)

=== Other Units ===
- 3rd Reserve Squadron

5 × Loening C-2-H (seaplane version of Loening OA-1)

- Aerial Survey Squadron

1 × Spartan C4, 1 × Messerschmitt BFW M18d, Junkers W 33, Junkers W 34

== Chinese Fighter Aircraft Aces ==
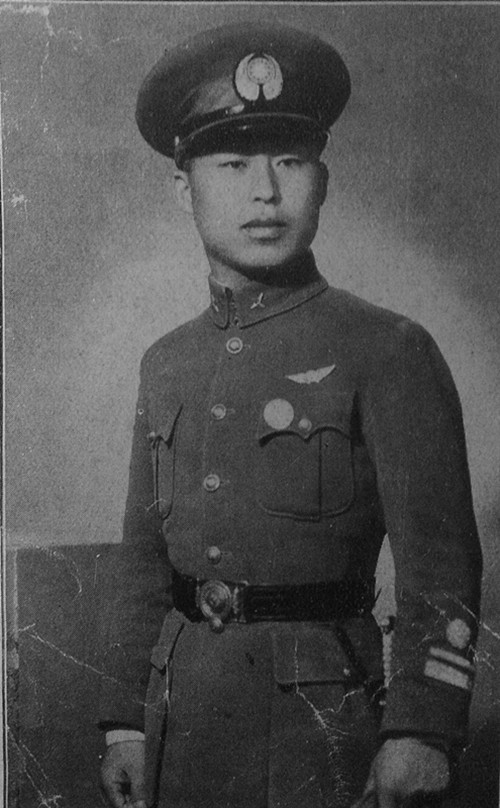
Colonel Kao Chih-hang, commander of the 4th Pursuit Group, had served in the air force of the Manchurian warlord Zhang Zuolin

=== Nationalist Chinese Aviators ===
- Liu Zhesheng (柳哲生 -Liu Chi-Sheng): 11-1/3 (9 confirmed according to Republic of China records)
- Wang Kuang-Fu (王光復): 8
- Gao Youxin: 8
- Yuan Baokang (袁葆康): 8 victories
- Liu Tsui-Gang (Liu Cuigang) (劉粹剛) †: 7+
- Tsang Shi-Lan (臧錫蘭): 7
- Tan Kun (譚鯤): 5 or 6
- Yue Yiqin (樂以琴) †: 5
- Zhou Zhikai (周志開) †: 5
- Zhang Guangming (張光明): 5
- Lo Ying-Te (羅英德): 5
- Leng Pei-Su (冷培澍): 5
- Chow Ting-Fong (周廷芳): 6
- Lu Ji-Chun(呂基純) †: 5
- Mao Yingchu (毛瀛初): 5

=== Chinese-American Volunteer and/or Former Provincial/Warlord Aviators ===
- John Wong Pan-Yang (黄泮扬): 13 victories (American-born Chinese air force volunteer)
- John "Buffalo" Wong (黃新瑞) †: 8.5 victories (Chinese-born American volunteer in the CAF)
- Chen Ruitian a.k.a. Arthur Chin (陳瑞鈿): 7 victories (American-born Chinese air force volunteer)
- Zhu Jiaxun (朱嘉勋 - Chu Chia-hsun) 5+ victories (former Guangxi-Bai Chongxi/Li Zongren warlord air force pilot)
- Cen Zeliu (岑泽鎏 - Shim Tsak-lai, Sh'en Tse-liu) †: 5+ victories (former Guangdong-Chen Jitang warlord air force pilot)
- Louie Yim-Qun (雷炎均): 3-5 victories (American-born Chinese air force volunteer)
- Teng Li-Chun 2.5 victories, He flew 60 combat missions during WWII as a member of the Chinese-American Composite Wing (Provisional) in the 1st Wing of the 14th Air Force. He flew another 220 combat missions against the communist Chinese. He retired as a Colonel in the Republic of China Air Force with 18 Chinese military decorations and the Air Medal from the United States.

== Foreign Aid ==
=== Soviet Union ===
From 1937 until early 1941, the Soviet Union served as the principal supplier to the Chinese Nationalist air force. Between October 1937 and January 1941, a total of 848 aircraft in 13 batches were ordered by the Chinese government and delivered on credit, amounting to an estimated value of US$200 million. An additional 37 aircraft were handed over to the Chinese when Soviet forces withdrew from China following the signing of the Soviet–German Non-Aggression Pact.

The Soviet aircraft deliveries included 563 fighters: 252 I-152, 75 I-153, 132 I-16 Type 5, 75 I-16 Type 10, and 10 I-16 Type 17. The remainder were I-15 bis models, which were not part of the original 13-batch order.

The bomber component comprised 322 aircraft, including 179 SB-2M-100A, 100 SB-2M-103, 24 DB-3, 6 TB-3, and 13 additional SB bombers outside the 13-batch procurement. Also delivered were 5 UT-1 trainers. Despite the substantial numbers, only a small portion of the 250–300 combat aircraft supplied annually survived through the end of each calendar year due to intense combat attrition.

=== United States ===
Although the Soviet Union initially provided the bulk of military aircraft to Chiang Kai-shek, the Chinese had already acquired several American aircraft prior to full U.S. involvement in the war. Early models supplied by the Curtiss Aeroplane and Motor Company—such as the Hawk II and Hawk III biplanes—formed the backbone of Chinese fighter aviation in the mid-1930s. These were later followed by the Hawk 75 monoplane. A demonstrator Hawk 75N model, with fixed landing gear, was acquired in 1938 and became the personal aircraft of American advisor Claire Lee Chennault, who played a key role in Chinese pilot training and in advocating further procurement of American aircraft.

Following the outbreak of the Pacific War in December 1941, the Chinese Nationalist air force began receiving extensive Lend-Lease equipment from the United States. In fact, American aircraft deliveries had already commenced as early as mid-1941, with some initial shipments recorded as direct purchases. From this point onward, the United States replaced the Soviet Union as the primary source of aircraft for China's air force during the Second Sino-Japanese War, which had effectively begun with Japan's invasion of Manchuria in 1931.

Most pilot retraining on American aircraft took place in Karachi and other locations in India, where Chinese pilots were sent either in groups or as complete squadrons. Starting in late 1941, many freshly graduated cadets were dispatched to the United States for extended training programmes tailored to American aircraft systems.

The first American P-43A fighters were received by the 4th Air Group (21st–24th Squadrons) in March 1942. Initial conversion training occurred in Kunming, after which pilots were flown in small groups to India. A series of accidents marred the transition process: on 24 April 1942, Wu Zhenhua, deputy commander of the 24th Squadron, was killed in a crash while flying to Kunming. On 12 May, flight commander Chen Lokun died during landing. In July, group commander Zheng Shaoyu perished when his P-43 caught fire mid-air. Deputy group commander Chen Sheng Sheng was also killed during a training flight on 3 August. Similar fatal incidents accompanied the transition to nearly every new aircraft type introduced to Chinese forces. (Notably, most Chinese-language sources document only the deaths of ranking officers, with line pilot casualties rarely recorded.)

By February 1943, the Chinese began transferring their primary training groups to India in preparation for new American aircraft. While training in reconnaissance and aerial photography continued within China, most cadets now completed their primary instruction in India before being sent to the United States for advanced training. By March 1945, a total of 1,220 cadets had been dispatched to the U.S., of whom 384 returned to participate in active combat operations.

Between 1942 and 1945, a total of 420 training aircraft were shipped from the U.S. to China via India. These included:

- 20 × AT-6 advanced trainers
- 8 × AT-7 navigation trainers
- 15 × AT-17 twin-engine trainers
- 150 × Stearman PT-17 primary trainers
- 127 × Fairchild PT-19 trainers
- 70 × Consolidated PT-22 trainers
- 30 × BT-13 basic trainers
- 10 × D-17 Staggerwing light utility and medical aircraft

== Domestic Assembly of Aircraft ==
Although the modified Hawk 75M with retractable landing gear was developed specifically for China, it saw limited operational use against Japanese forces. In mid to late 1938, thirty complete aircraft and eighty-two knock-down kits were delivered. Assembly was to be conducted by the Central Aircraft Manufacturing Company (CAMCO), which had relocated its operations from Hankow to Loiwing, a site on the eastern bank of the Ruiluqiang River in Yunnan Province, near the Burmese frontier. The location was initially considered safe from Japanese air raids. However, persistent technical issues hampered production efforts, and by October 1940 only eight aircraft had been completed. The fate of the remaining kits remains uncertain.

Following the unsuccessful Hawk 75M programme, CAMCO shifted its focus to the assembly of the export version of the Curtiss-Wright CW-21 "Demon" interceptor. Three fully assembled aircraft and thirty-two sets of parts were imported from the United States. Assembly proceeded at the Loiwing facility until April 1942, when Japanese advances prompted an evacuation to Kunming . American personnel subsequently transferred operations to India.

In late 1942, as Japanese forces pushed through Burma, the 1st Air Force Aircraft Manufacturing Factory (1st AFAMF) was relocated inland to Kweiyang in Kweichow Province. At this new site, the Chinese government initiated a bold attempt to develop an indigenous fighter aircraft, the XP-1. Featuring a distinctive forward-swept gull-wing design, the XP-1 was intended to lessen China's reliance on foreign-built warplanes. However, the project was ultimately unsuccessful, likely due to aerodynamic instability inherent in the aircraft's structure.

Between 1943 and 1946, CAMCO—by then dispersed across various ravines near Kunming—assembled a small experimental batch of nine monoplane fighters. These aircraft were believed to have incorporated components from Hawk 75M, Hawk 75A-5, and CW-21 models. They bore some resemblance to American prototypes, and while their operational use remains obscure, at least one of them has been identified in Western sources under the designation Chu XP-0.

== Ranks ==
=== Officers ===
	General officers			Senior commissioned officers			Junior commissioned officers			Warrant officers
Insignia
Title	Colonel general 一級上將 General 二級上將	Lieutenant general 中將	Major general 少將	Colonel 上校	Lieutenant colonel 中校	Major 少校	Captain 上尉	Lieutenant 中尉	Second lieutenant 少尉	Warrant Officer 准尉

=== Other ranks ===
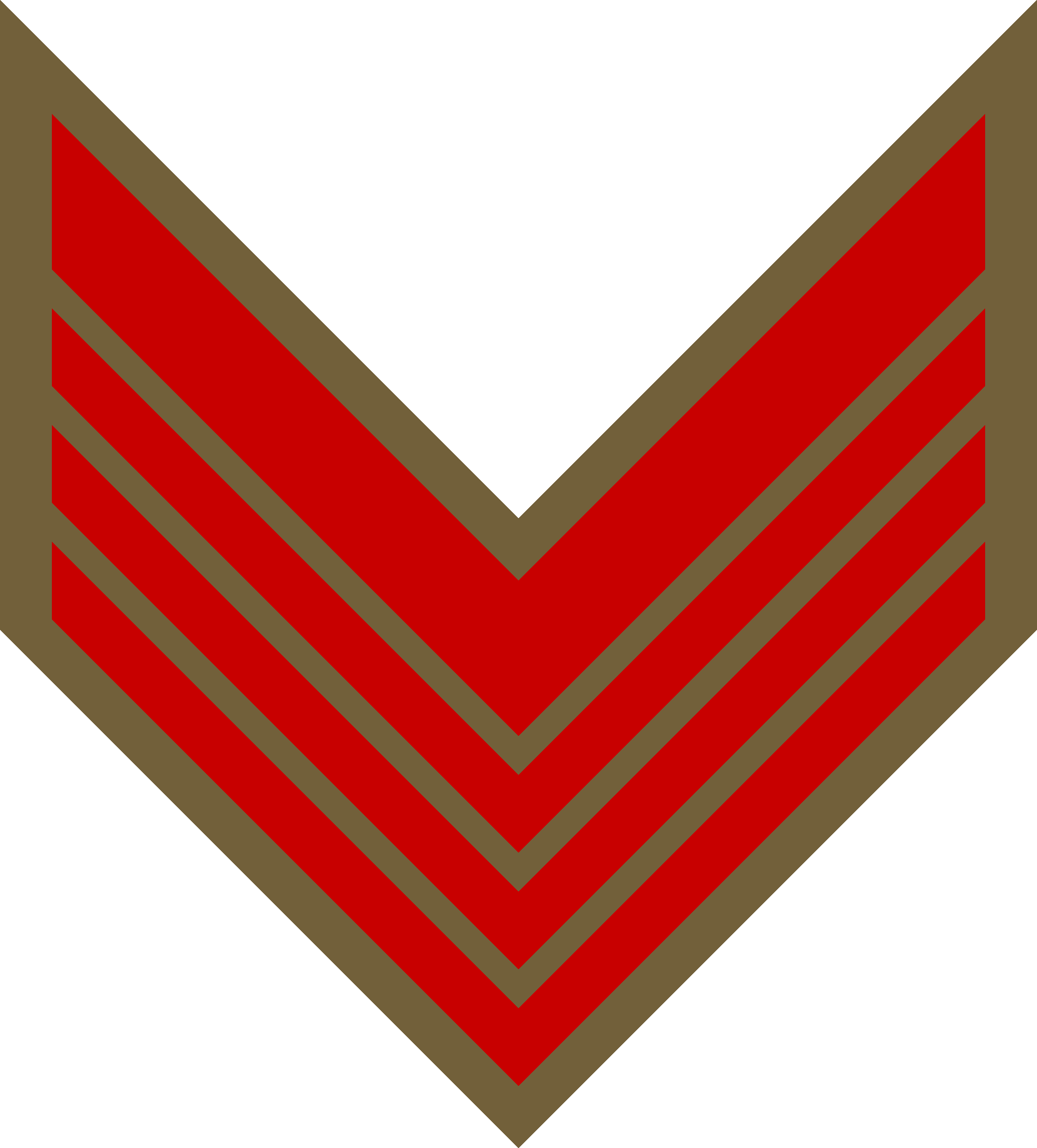
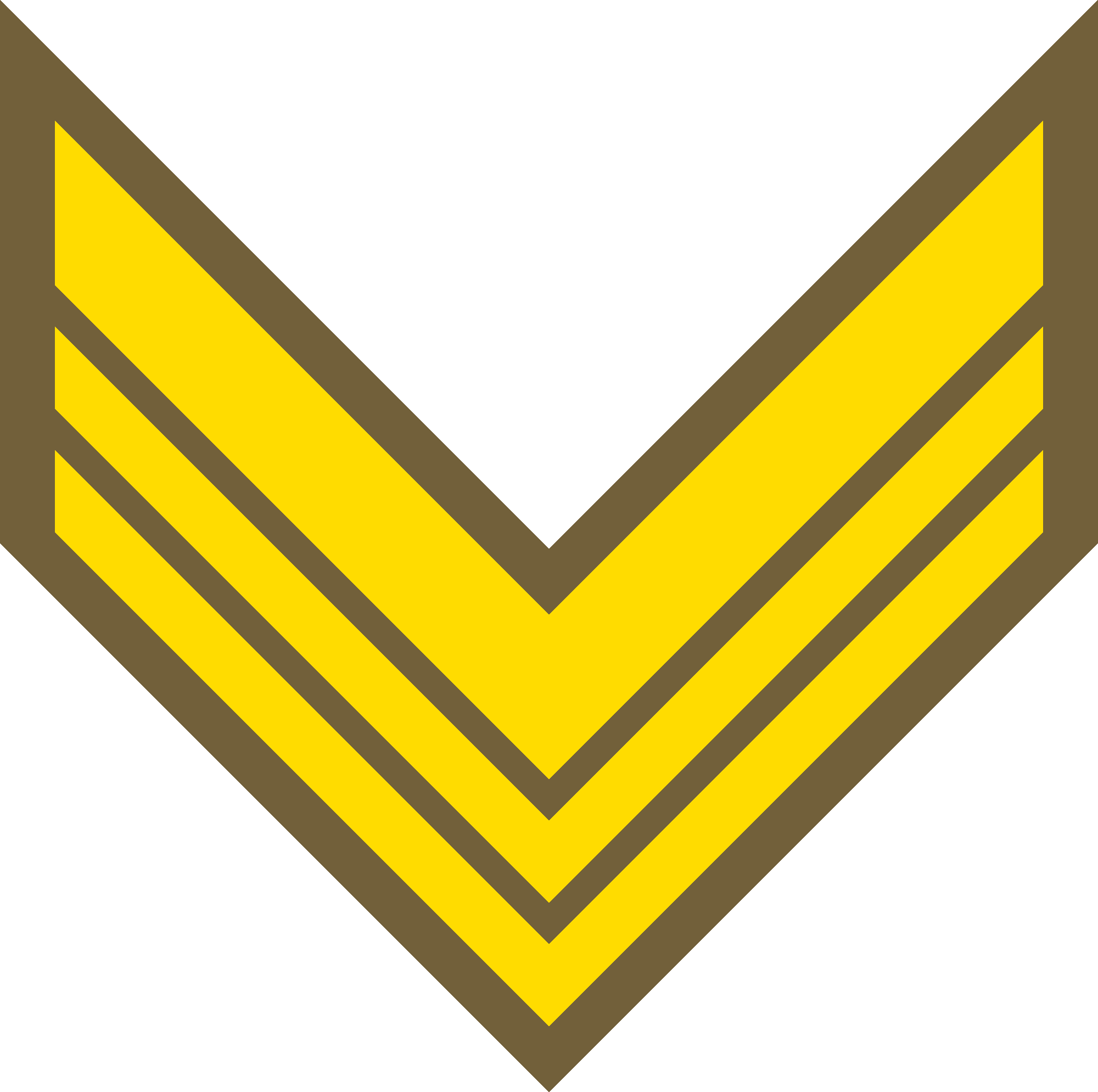
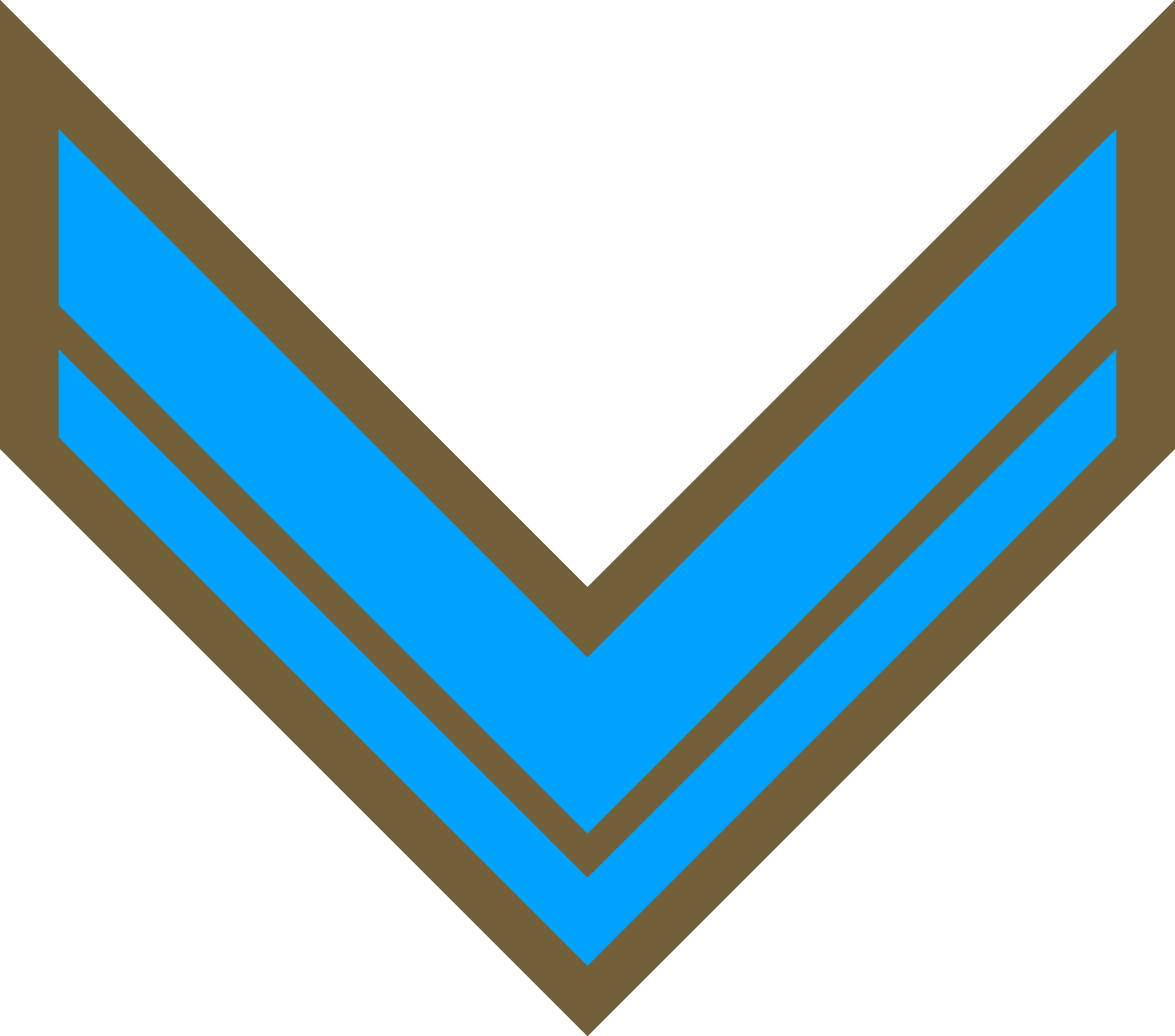
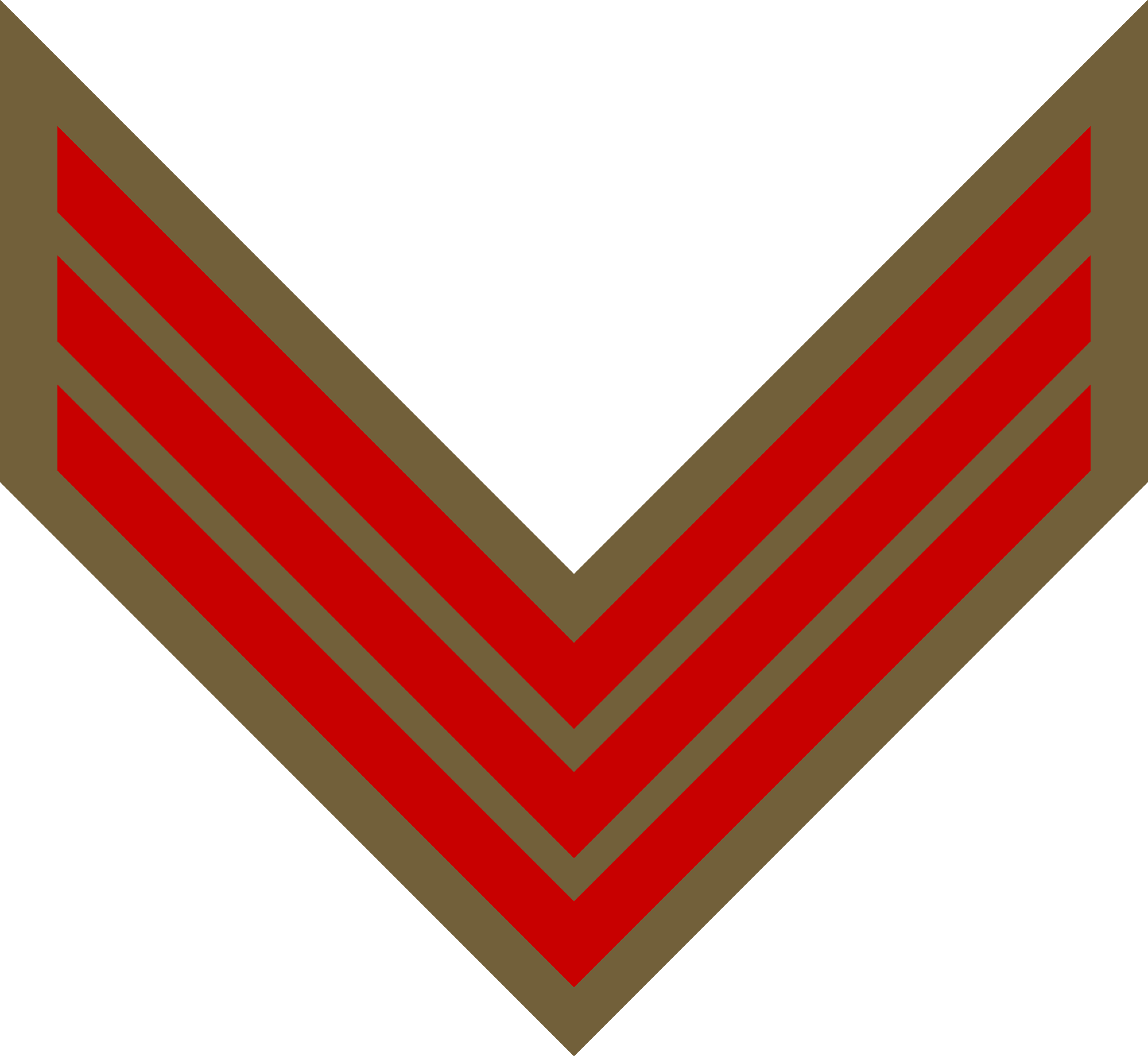
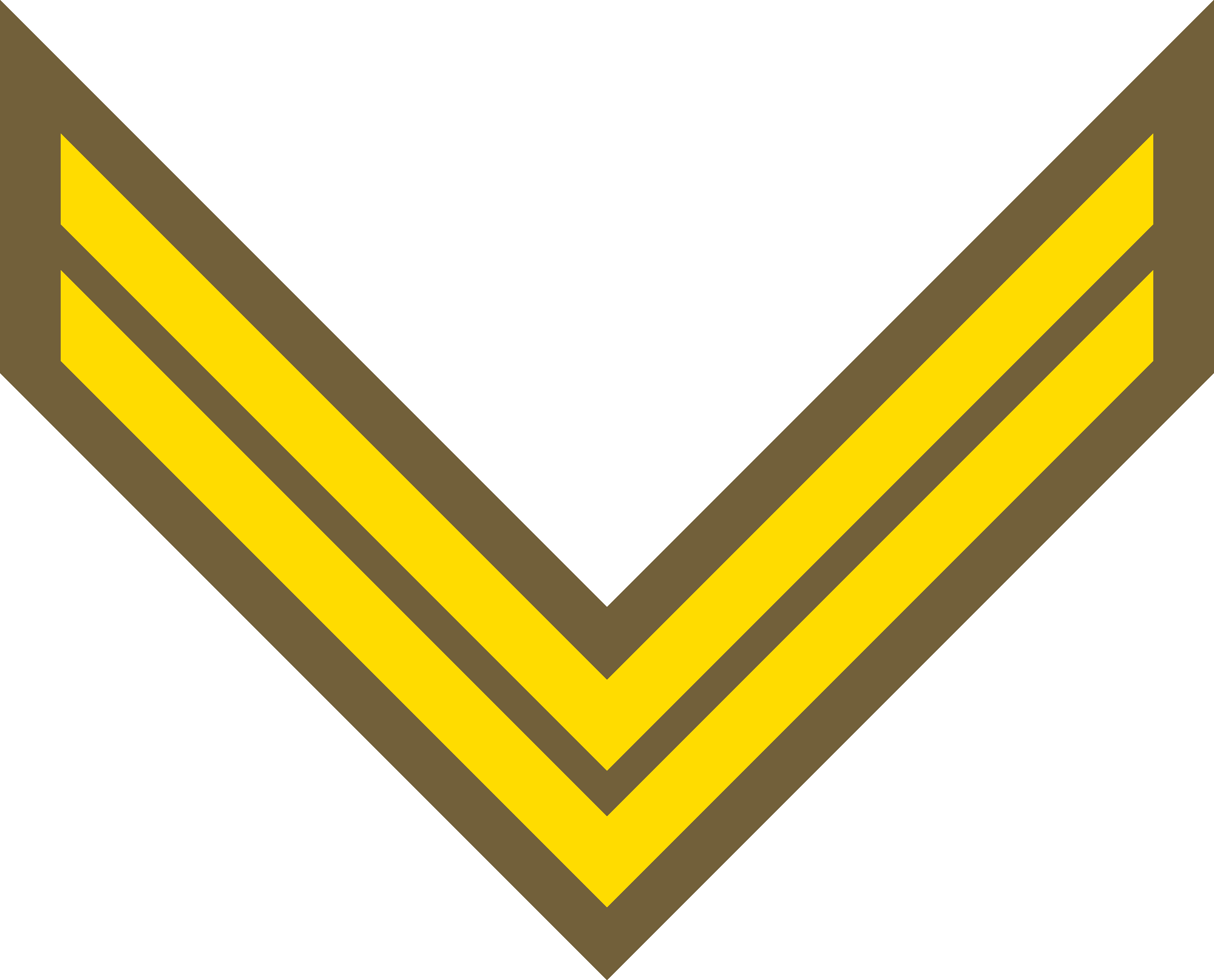
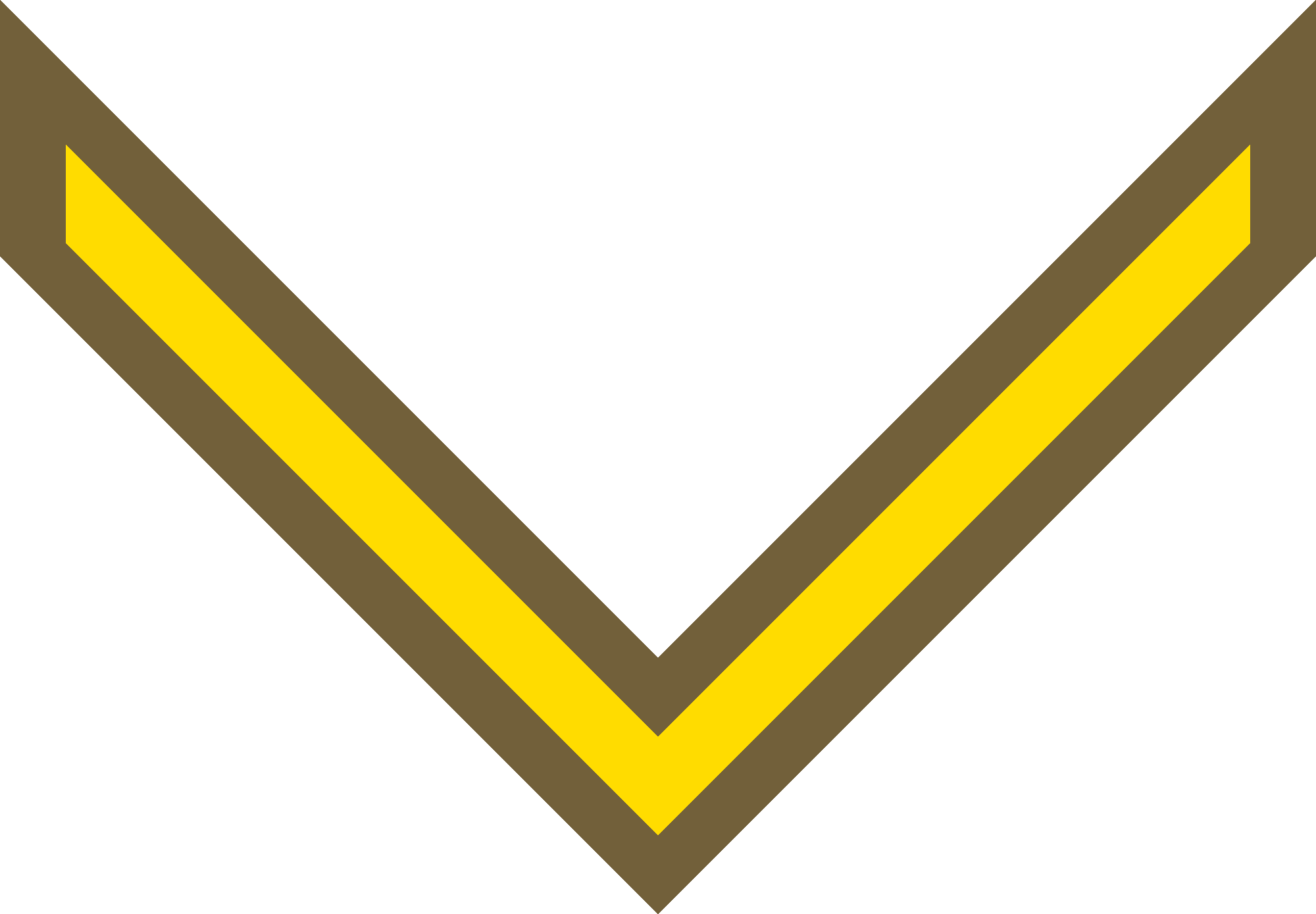
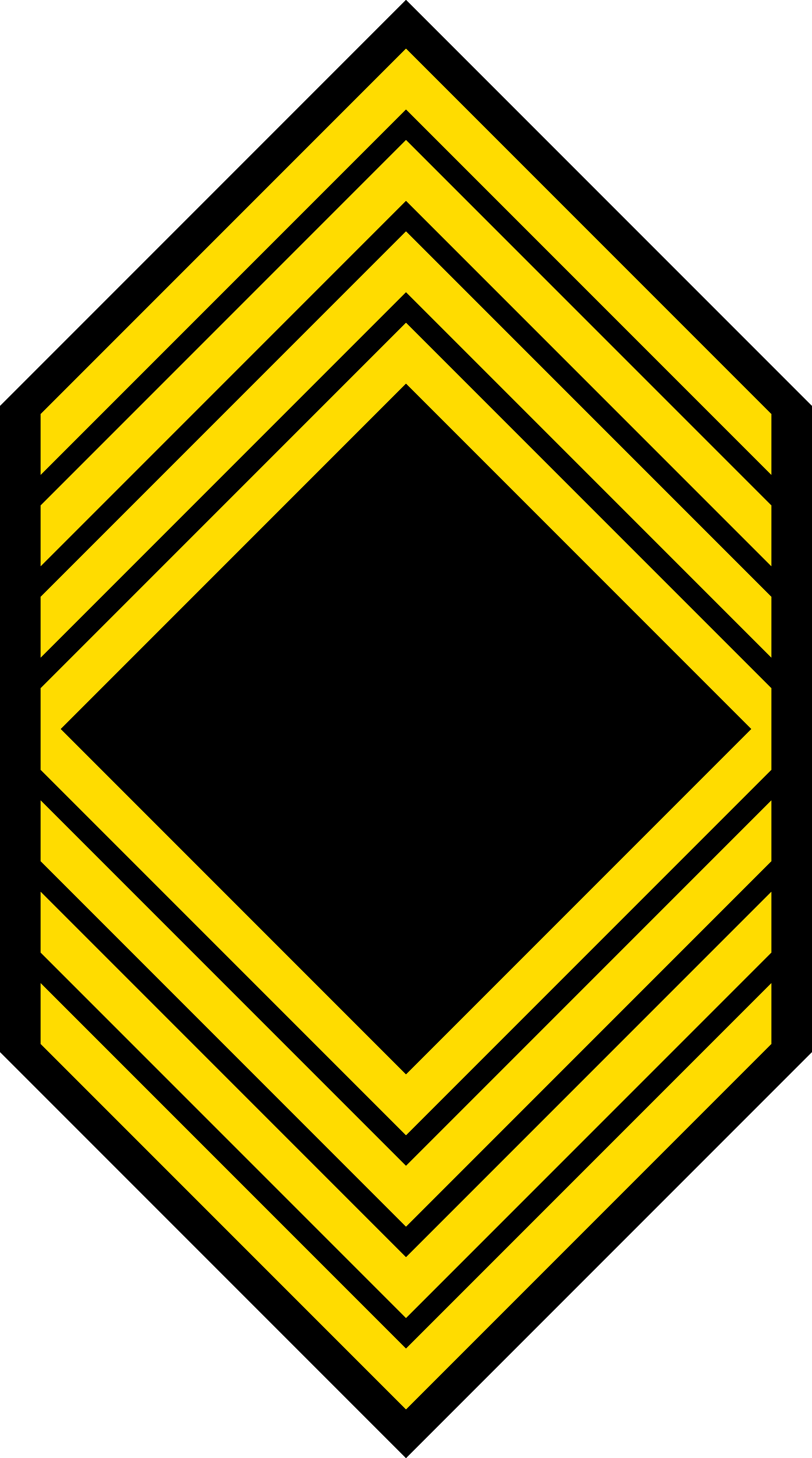
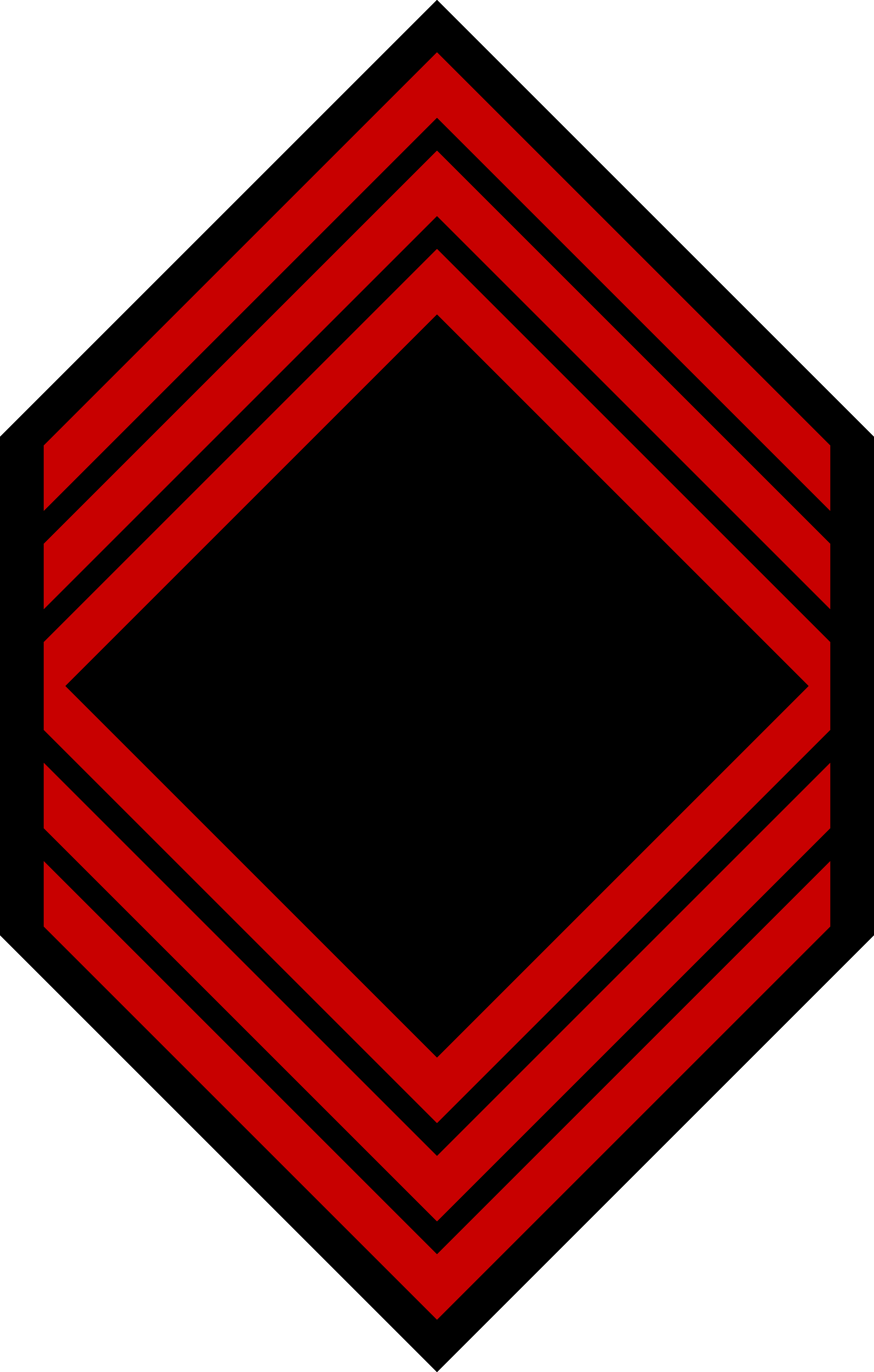
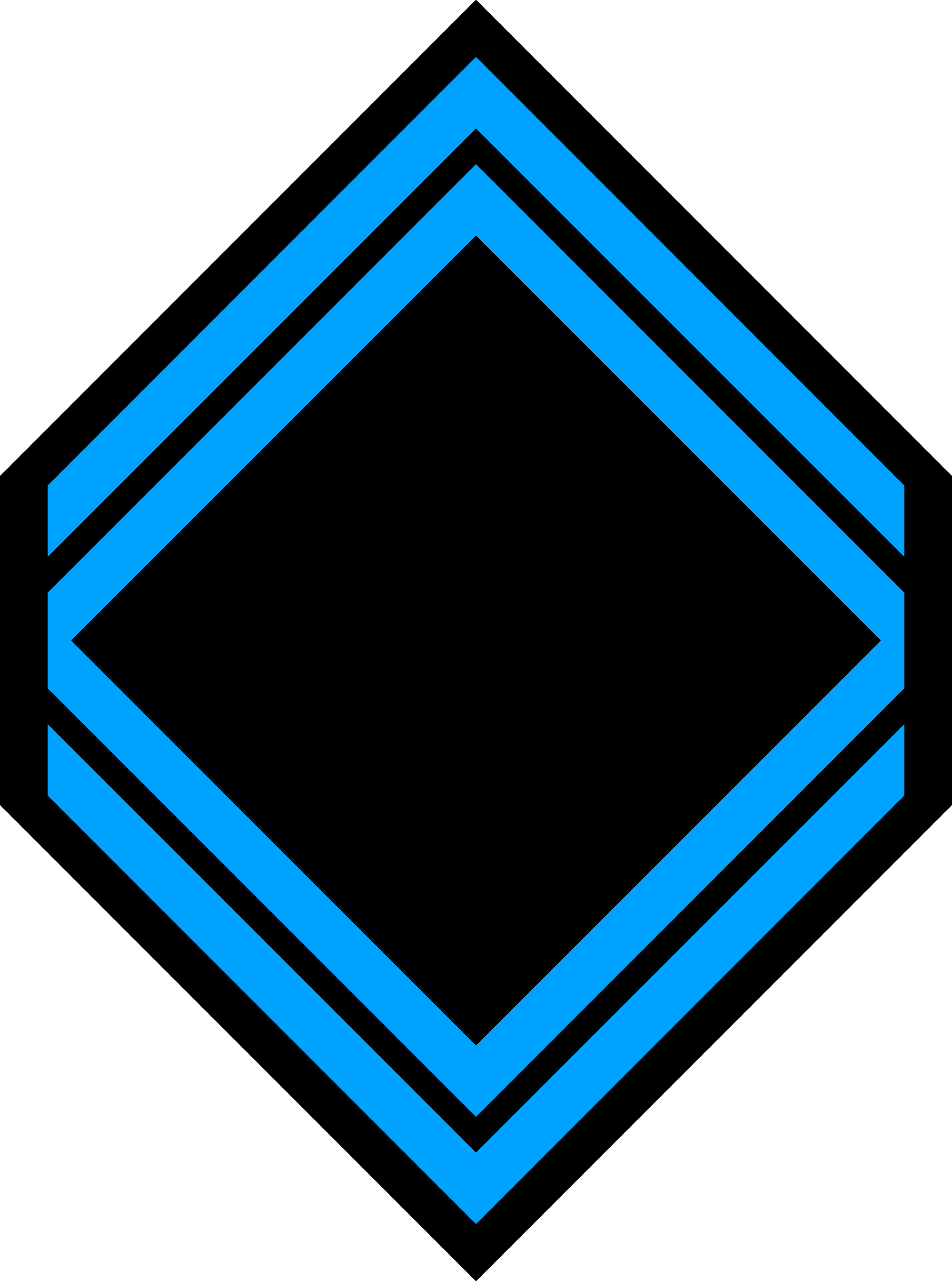
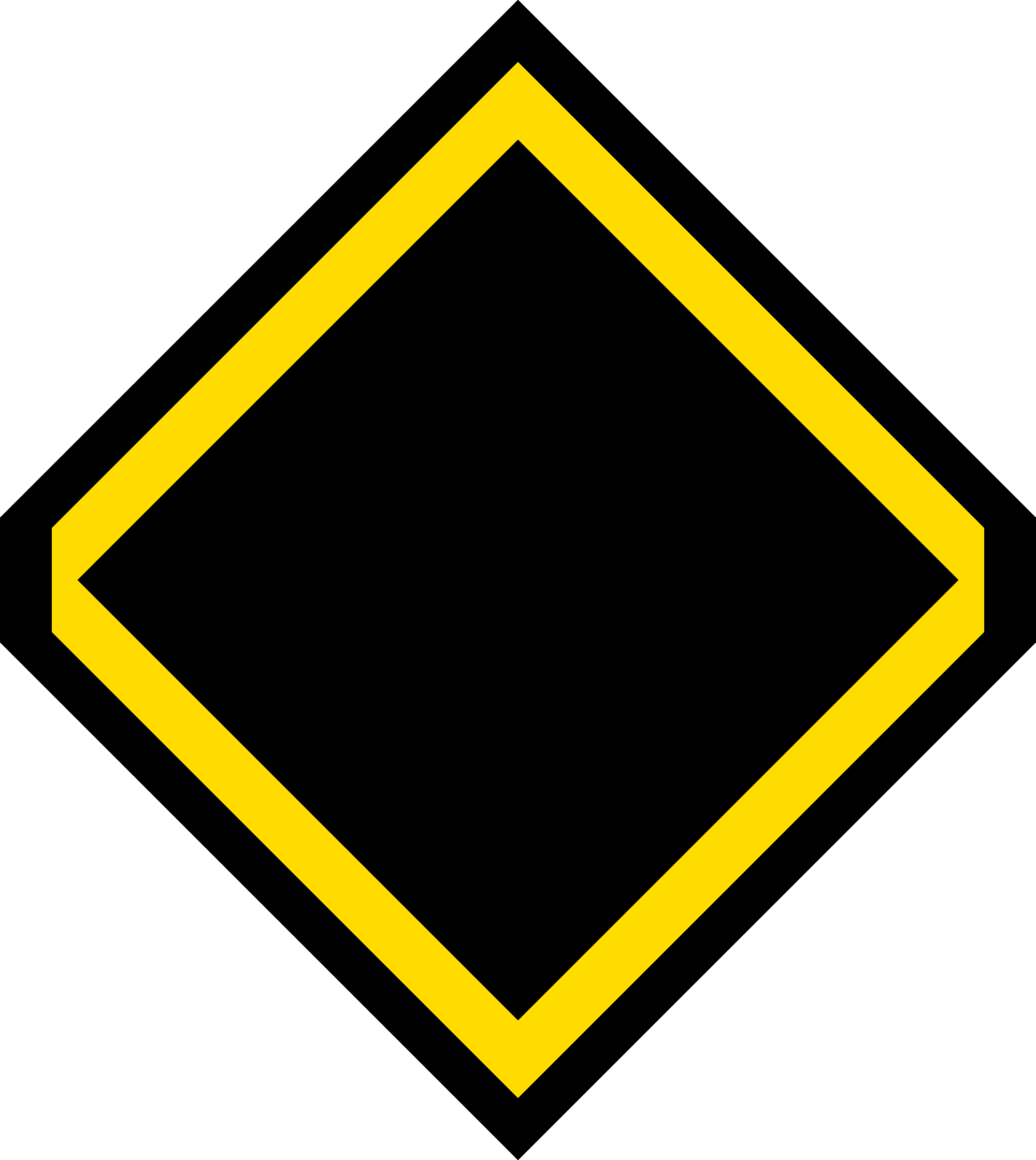
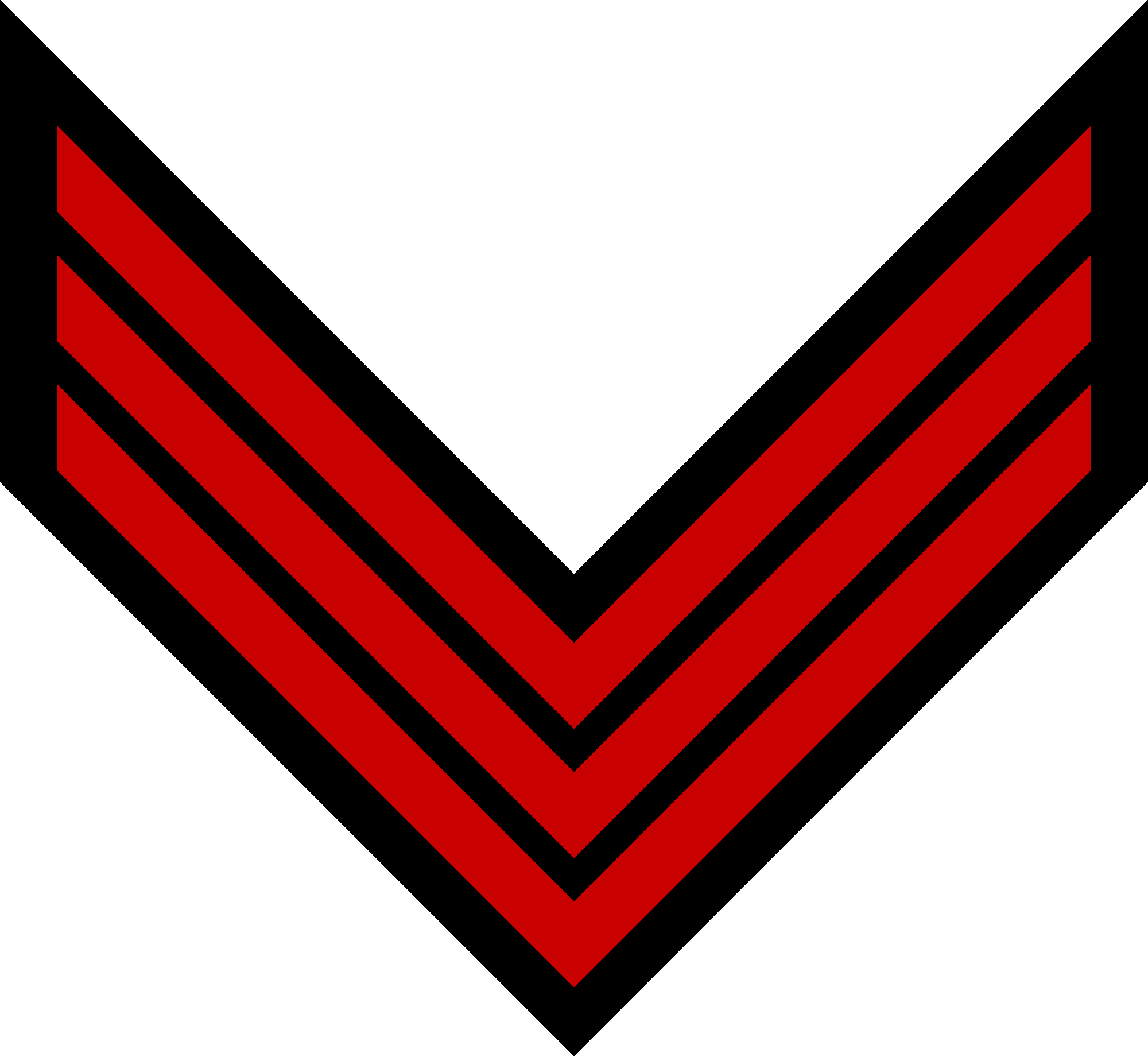
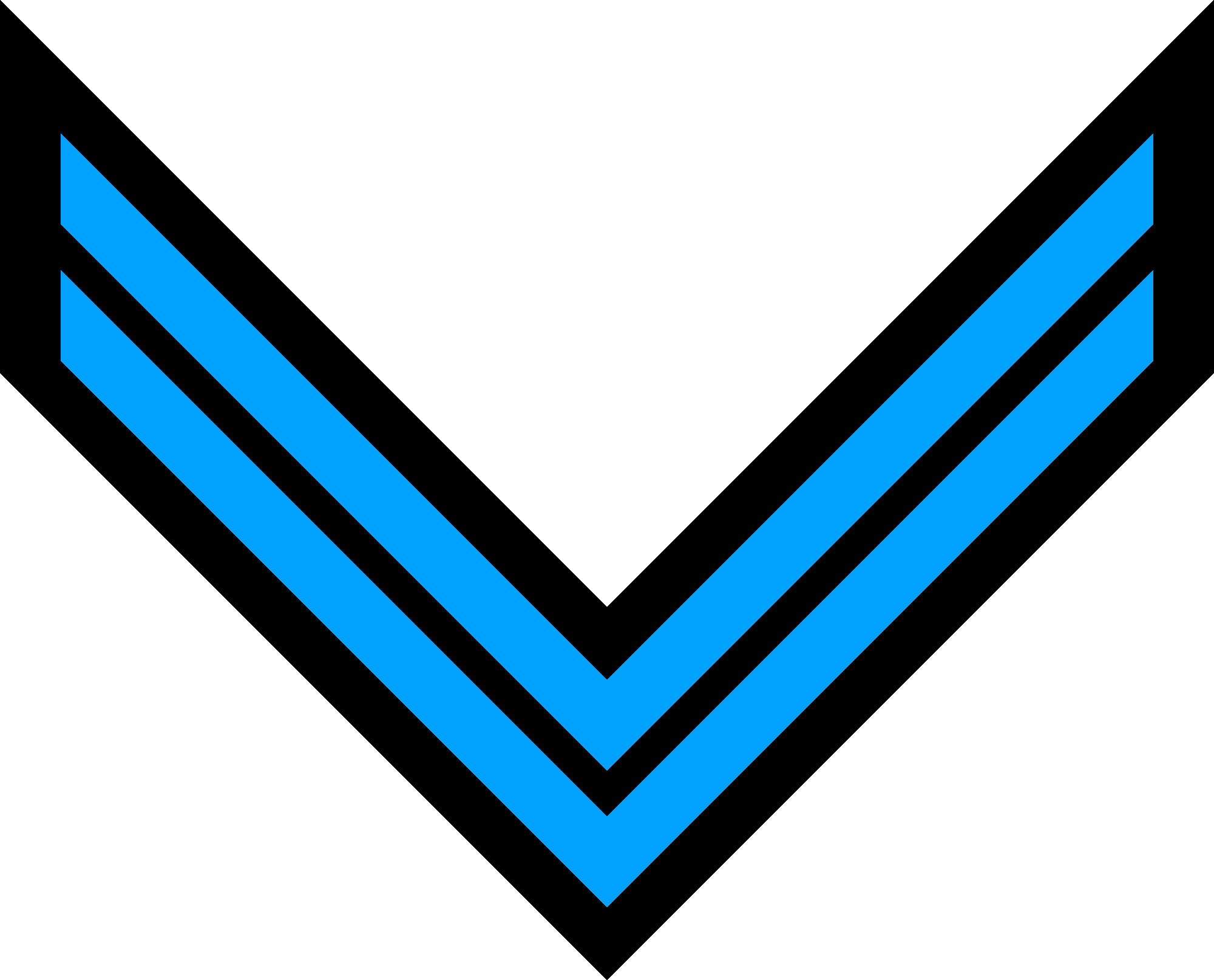
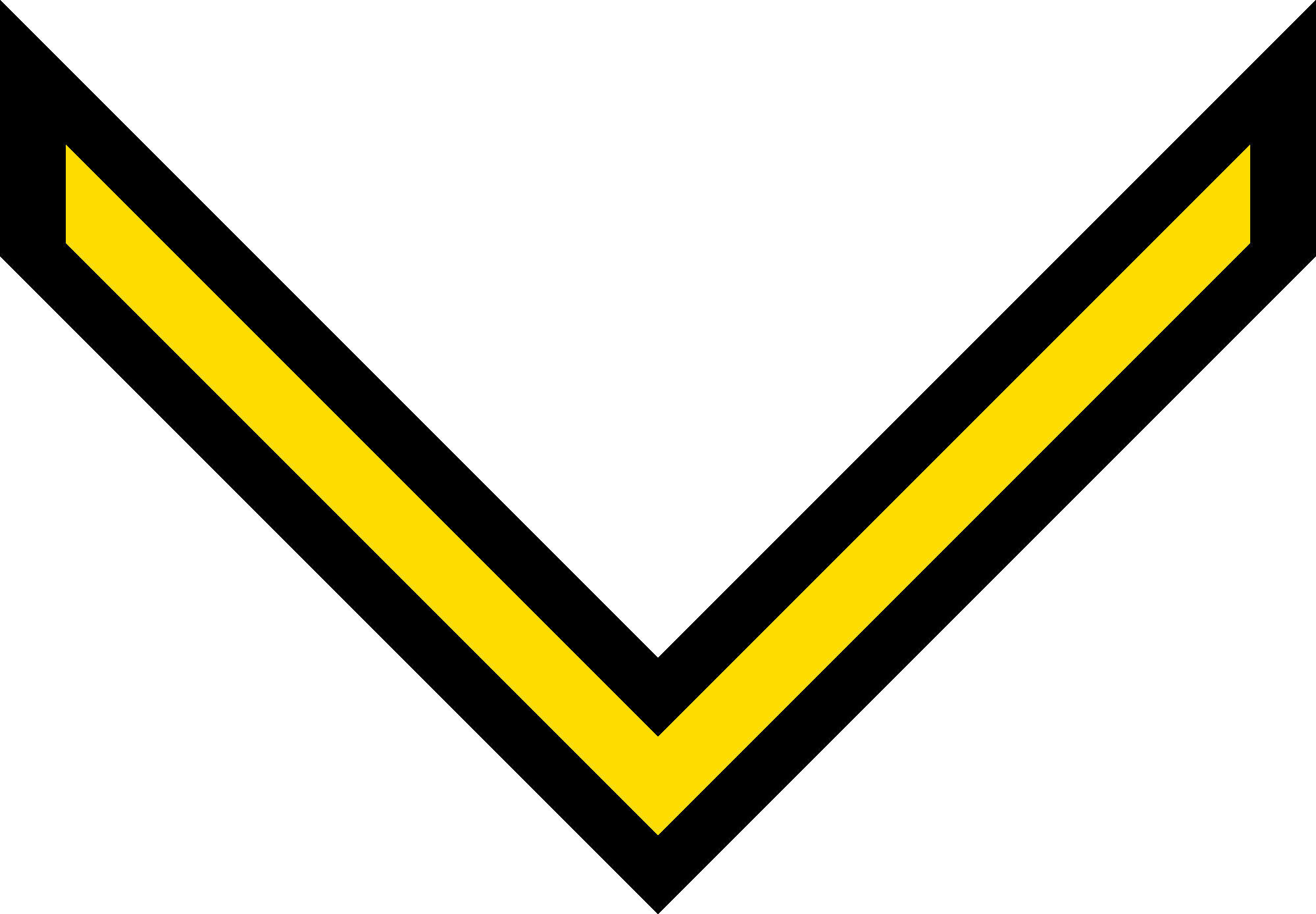
	Non-commissioned officers				Enlisted
1934–1938
1934–1938		上士; Shàngshì	中士; Zhōngshì	下士; Xiàshì	上等兵; Shàngděng bīng	一等兵; Yīděng bīng	二等兵; Èrděng bīng
1938–1944
1938–1944	軍士長; Jūnshìzhǎng	上士; Shàngshì	中士; Zhōngshì	下士; Xiàshì	上等兵; Shàngděng bīng	一等兵; Yīděng bīng	二等兵; Èrděng bīng

== See also ==
- Air Warfare of WWII from the Sino-Japanese War perspective
- Aerial engagements of the Second Sino-Japanese War
- Soong Mei-ling
- Xu Huansheng
