= Vultee P-66 Vanguard =

Fighter aircraft built by Vultee Aircraft

P-66 Vanguard
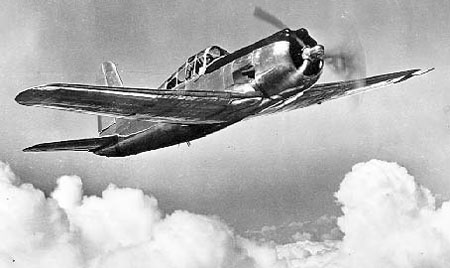
- Vultee P-66 in flight.

General information
- Type: Fighter
- Manufacturer: Vultee Aircraft
- Designer: Richard W. Palmer
- Primary users: United States Army Air Forces Chinese Nationalist Air Force
- Number built: 146

History
- Manufactured: 1940–1942
- Introduction date: 1941 (date shipment completed)
- First flight: 8 September 1939 (Model 61)
- Retired: 1943 (USA)

The Vultee P-66 Vanguard was a United States Army Air Forces fighter aircraft. It was initially ordered by Sweden, but by the time the aircraft were ready for delivery in 1941, the United States would not allow them to be exported, designating them as P-66s and retaining them for defensive and training purposes. Eventually, a large number were sent to China where they were pressed into service as combat aircraft with mixed results.

== Design and development ==
Vultee's chief engineer Richard W. Palmer, made an all out effort to secure substantial military orders on the eve of World War II. According to Jonathan Thompson, "Palmer and his staff project no fewer than four types, all with the same wing design and similar fuselage structure; the model 48 pursuit fighter, model 51 basic combat, model 54 advanced trainer and model 54A basic trainer." Sweden placed an order for 111 48Cs, but they were diverted for use by the USAAF as the P-66, and then diverted to India and China. The Vultee BC-51 lost out to North America's AT-6 as the Air Corps' advanced trainer, though one was delivered as the BC-3. The Vultee model 54A, similar to the model 54 but with fixed landing gear, was selected by the USAAC as the BT-13.

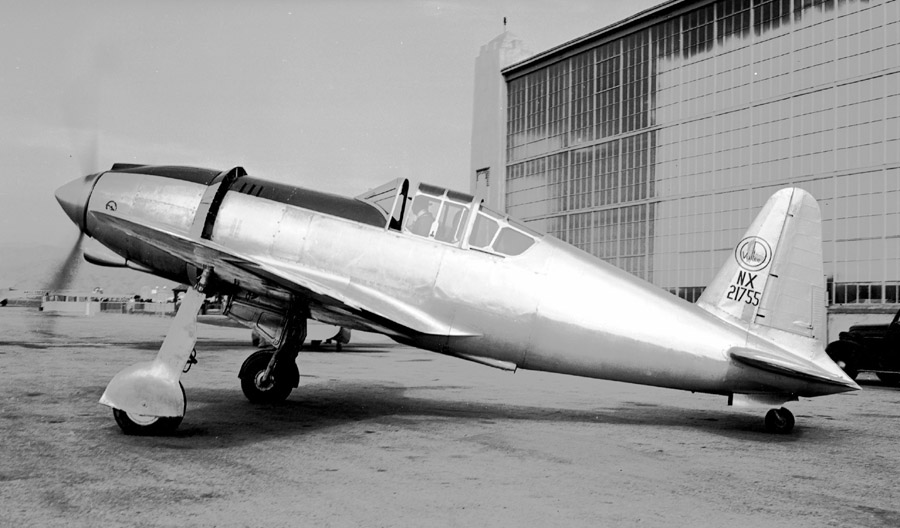
NX21755 at Burbank in 1939

In 1938, Richard W. Palmer started the detailed design of the V-48 fighter member of the quartet. The aircraft featured a metal-covered, semi-monocoque fuselage and fully retractable landing gear, and was powered by a Pratt & Whitney R-1830 air-cooled radial engine. During construction of the first prototype, a decision was made to lengthen the propeller shaft and install a tight cowling to provide a pointed nose to reduce drag. The first aircraft flew in September 1939 piloted by Vance Breese, and was assigned registration number NX21755. The fighter was named the Vanguard. On 9 May 1940, the prototype collided with a Lockheed Sirius while landing at Vultee airfield, the impact severing one main undercarriage leg. Nevertheless, Breese skillfully landed the airplane with little additional damage. It was subsequently rebuilt with the orthodox cowling as employed on subsequent machines.

== Operational history ==
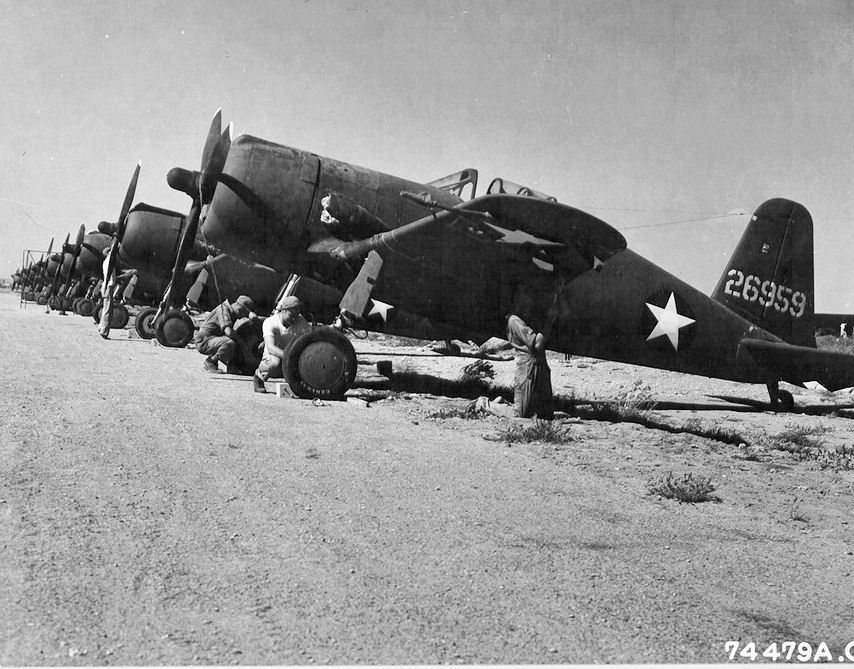
Vultee P-66 Vanguards at Karachi Airfield in India on October 25, 1942.

On 6 February 1940, the Swedish government ordered 144 Vanguards as the V-48C. The production prototype flew on 6 September 1940. The model V-48C was similar to the V-48X except for installation of a later version of the R-1830 engine with better higher altitude performance and provision for four .30 in (7.62 mm) machine guns in the wings and two .50 in (12.7 mm) machine guns in the fuselage.

When production deliveries began in September 1941, the U.S. government placed an embargo on exporting the aircraft to Sweden. In the aftermath of Pearl Harbor, all Vanguards were assigned the designation P-66. Production ended in April 1942. Approximately 50 aircraft were retained by the USAAF and primarily used at pursuit training bases in the western U.S. and were deployed to the 14th Pursuit Group in defensive roles. Although pilots were impressed by the P-66's handling, the type was considered less than robust and a tendency to ground-loop led to 15 aircraft being destroyed in landing accidents.

The British government took possession of 100 P-66s as the Vanguard I with plans to use the aircraft as an advanced trainer in Canada. After concluding their trials however, the British then relinquished the aircraft to China where 104 Vanguards (including USAAC examples) were shipped under the Lend-Lease program. They were originally intended to equip the 3rd American Volunteer Group (AVG); however, plans for additional groups were dropped after the Japanese attack on Pearl Harbor.

The Chinese received the assembled fighters via India by late 1942; Chinese Vanguards had USAAF insignia and serials as well as Chinese markings and Vultee serials on factory models. The undistinguished combat record of the Vanguard in China was due to problems that began in transit where a number of Vanguards were destroyed during tests in India and others lost while en route to China. Assembled P-66s were deemed unairworthy and abandoned at Karachi resulting in only 12 Vanguards on station at Kunming with the 74th Fighter Squadron of the 23rd Fighter Group, but this unit saw little action. Two Chinese squadrons from the 3rd Group and the 5th Group based at An-Su saw combat action with the Vanguard from August 1943 onward. However, many P-66s were destroyed on the ground during Japanese attacks while several were shot down in error when they were mistaken for the Nakajima firm's Ki-43 "Oscar" and Ki-44 "Tojo". Although the Vanguard possessed a top speed of 340 mph (550 km/h), it was no match for the agile Japanese fighters in high-g maneuvers and relied on hit-and-run tactics against the Japanese.

The P-66 in Chinese service was largely replaced by Curtiss P-40s in 1943. A number of surviving P-66 Vanguards were placed in caves for storage at Chungking for use in the civil war against Mao's Communists. As late as 1947, many were reportedly still in their crates.

== Operators ==
China

- Chinese Nationalist Air Force
  - 3rd Group
  - 5th Group

United Kingdom

- Royal Air Force, not used, aircraft originally ordered by Sweden, aircraft were delivered to China.

United States

- United States Army Air Forces

== Specifications (P-66) ==
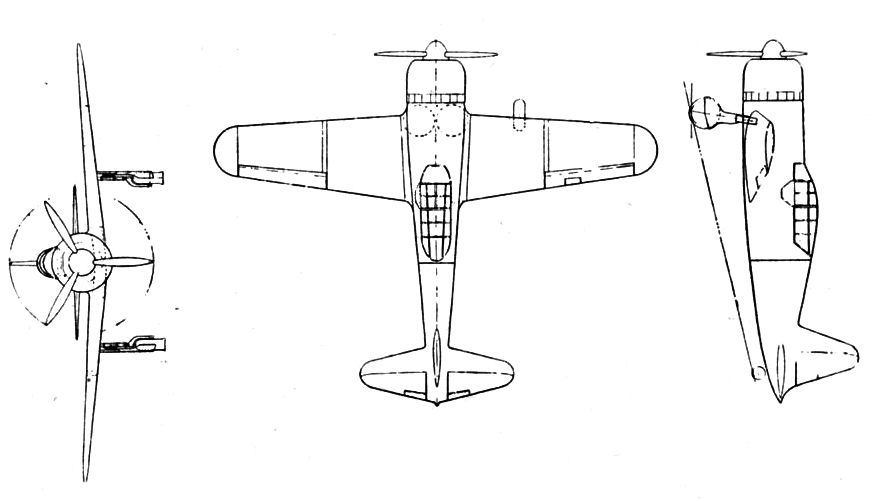
Vultee Vanguard 3-view drawing from L'Aerophile May 1940

Data from Skyways

General characteristics

- Crew: 1
- Length: 28 ft 5 in (8.66 m)
- Wingspan: 35 ft 10 in (10.92 m)
- Wing area: 196.8 sq ft (18.28 m^{2})
- Empty weight: 5,237 lb (2,375 kg)
- Gross weight: 7,100 lb (3,221 kg)
- Max takeoff weight: 7,384 lb (3,349 kg)
- Powerplant: 1 × Pratt & Whitney R-1830-33 14 Cyl twin row radial, 1,200 hp (890 kW)
- Propellers: 3-bladed Hamilton Standard hydromatic

Performance

- Maximum speed: 300 kn (340 mph, 550 km/h) at 15,000 ft
- Cruise speed: 250 kn (290 mph, 470 km/h) at 17,000 ft
- Stall speed: 71 kn (82 mph, 132 km/h)
- Range: 740 nmi (850 mi, 1,370 km)
- Service ceiling: 28,200 ft (8,600 m)
- Rate of climb: 2,520 ft/min (12.8 m/s)
- Wing loading: 35 lb/sq ft (170 kg/m^{2})

Armament

- Guns: 4 × .30 in (7.62 mm) machine guns; 2 × .50 in (12.7 mm) machine guns

== See also ==
Related development

- Vultee BT-13 Valiant

Aircraft of comparable role, configuration, and era

- Bell XP-77
- Curtiss-Wright CW-21
- Nakajima Ki-43
- Republic P-43 Lancer
- Weiss Manfréd WM-23 Ezüst Nyíl

Related lists

- List of aircraft of World War II
- List of fighter aircraft
- List of military aircraft of the United States
