= List of aircraft used in China before 1937 =

This is a partial list of aircraft acquired by operators in China, prior to the start of the Second Sino-Japanese war on 7 July 1937.

== Military Aviation ==
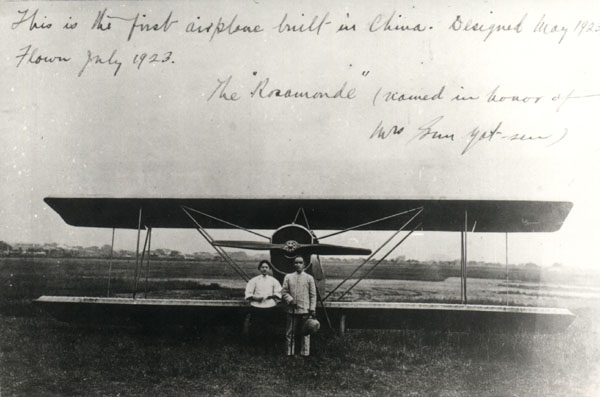
The Rosamonde biplane, the first indigenously designed aircraft in China shown here with Soong Qingling and Sun Yat-sen; Soong would fly as a passenger in the plane with pilot Huang Guangrui at the controls

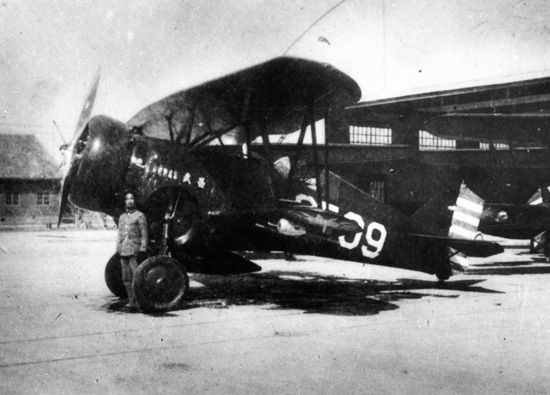
Chinese Hawk III, the primary fighter-attack of the Chinese Nationalist Air Force opposing the Japanese invasion in 1937, until superseded by Polikarpov I-15 and I-16 fighters

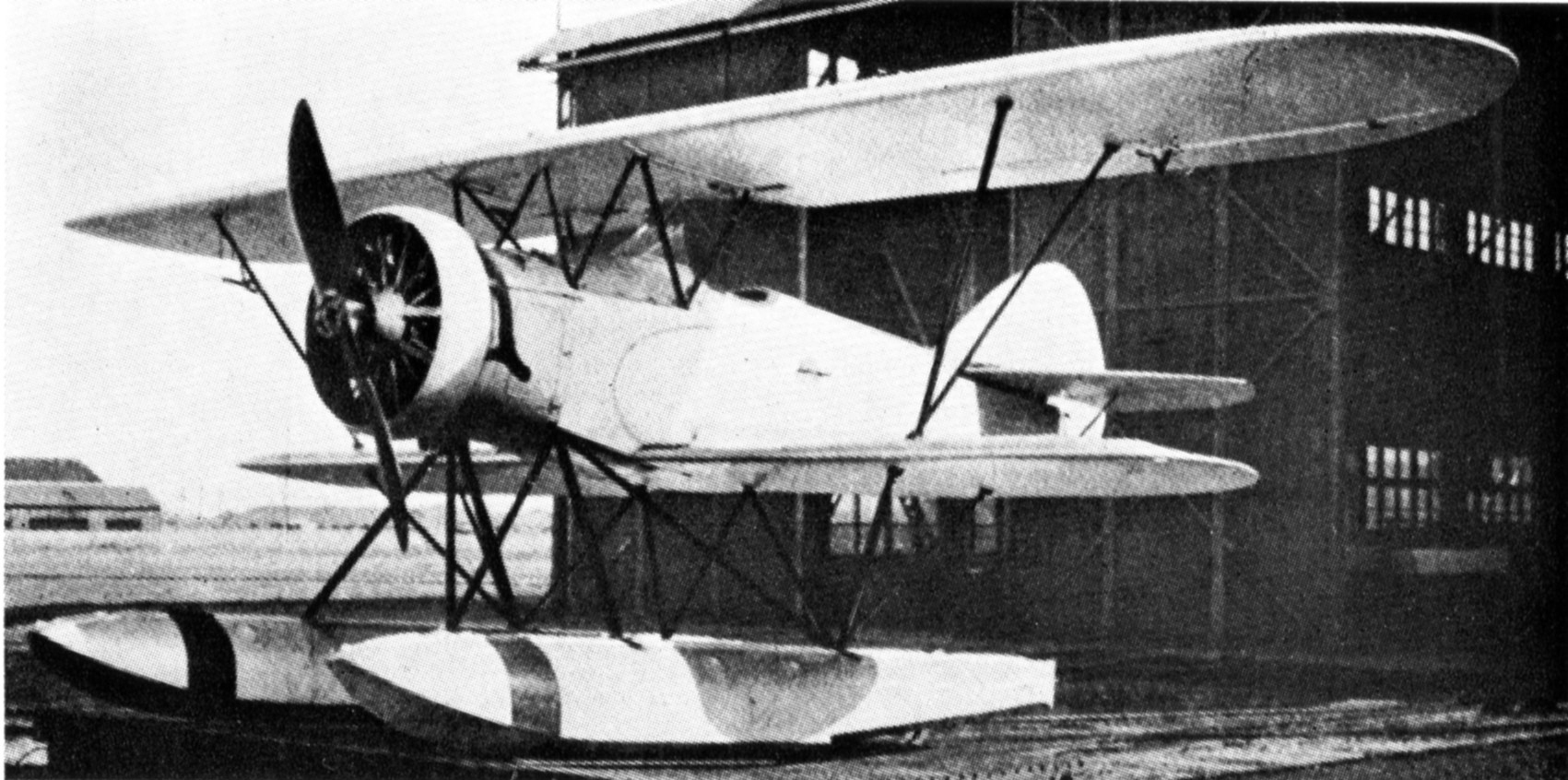
The Aichi AB-3, a single-seat, single-engined biplane, was designed to equip a light cruiser Ning Hai being built in Japan for the Chinese navy

=== Early Military Aviation ===
Revolutionary Faction

- Curtiss Model D
- Rumpler Taube

Beiyang Government

- Caudron G.2
- Caudron G.3
- Caudron G.4

=== Chinese Nationalist Air Force ===
- Avro 504
- Blackburn Lincock III
- Boeing Model 218
- Boeing Model 281
- Breda Ba.25
- Breda Ba.27
- Breda Ba.28
- Breguet 14
- Breguet 273
- Caproni Ca.101
- Caproni Ca.111
- Curtiss Shrike
- Curtiss Hawk II
- Curtiss Hawk III
- Curtiss JN-4
- de Havilland Gipsy Moth
- de Havilland Moth
- de Havilland Puss Moth
- Douglas O-2MC
- Fairchild KR-34CA
- Fairey Fox III, IV
- Fiat B.R.3
- Fiat C.R.30
- Fiat C.R.32
- Focke-Wulf S 24
- Focke-Wulf Fw 44
- Fokker C.V
- Heinkel He 66
- Heinkel He 111A
- Junkers K 47
- Martin B-10
- Northrop Alpha
- Northrop 2E, 2F Gamma
- Savoia-Marchetti S.72
- Vought V.65C Corsair

=== Republic of China Navy ===
- Aichi AB-3
- Avro 594 Avian IV
- Naval Air Establishment Beeng
- Naval Air Establishment Chiang Hung
- Naval Air Establishment Char
- Naval Air Establishment Chiang Gaen
- Naval Air Establishment Chiang Hau
- Naval Air Establishment Ding
- Naval Air Establishment Nin Hai
- Naval Air Establishment Wu
- Naval Air Establishment Yee
- Schreck FBA.17

=== Warlord and Provincial Military Aviation Branches ===
Guangdong Aviation Corps:

- Boeing Model 218
- Boeing Model 281
- Curtiss Hawk II
- Caudron C.59
- Heinkel He 111A
- Waco 240-A/CSO
- Waco ATO Taperwing
- Waco CTO Taperwing
- Douglas O-2MC

Guangdong Naval Aviation:

- Aeromarine 39B

Guangxi Clique Aviation Corps:

- Armstrong Whitworth Atlas
- Armstrong Whitworth A.W.16
- Avro 621 Tutor
- Nakajima Ko-4 (Nieuport-Delage NiD.29)

Fengtian Clique Air Force (Zhang Xueliang):

- Boeing 247
- Breguet 19
- Dewoitine D.27
- Junkers K 53
- Westland Wapiti VIII
- Vickers VIM
- Potez 25

Fengtian Clique - Shandong Aviation Corps (Zhang Zongchang):

- Junkers K 53

Shanxi Clique Aviation Corps (Yan Xishan):

- Junkers K 53

Sichuan Clique Aviation Corps (Liu Xiang):

- Junkers K 53
- Potez 25

West-North Aviation Corps (Feng Yuxiang):

- Ansaldo SVA

Xinjiang Province Aviation Corps (Sheng Shicai):

- Polikarpov R-1
- Polikarpov R-5
- Polikarpov U-2

=== Foreign Military Aviation Based in China ===
- Arrow Sport - British Army Air Corp in Shanghai
- Etrich Taube - Imperial German forces stationed in China

== Civilian Aviation ==
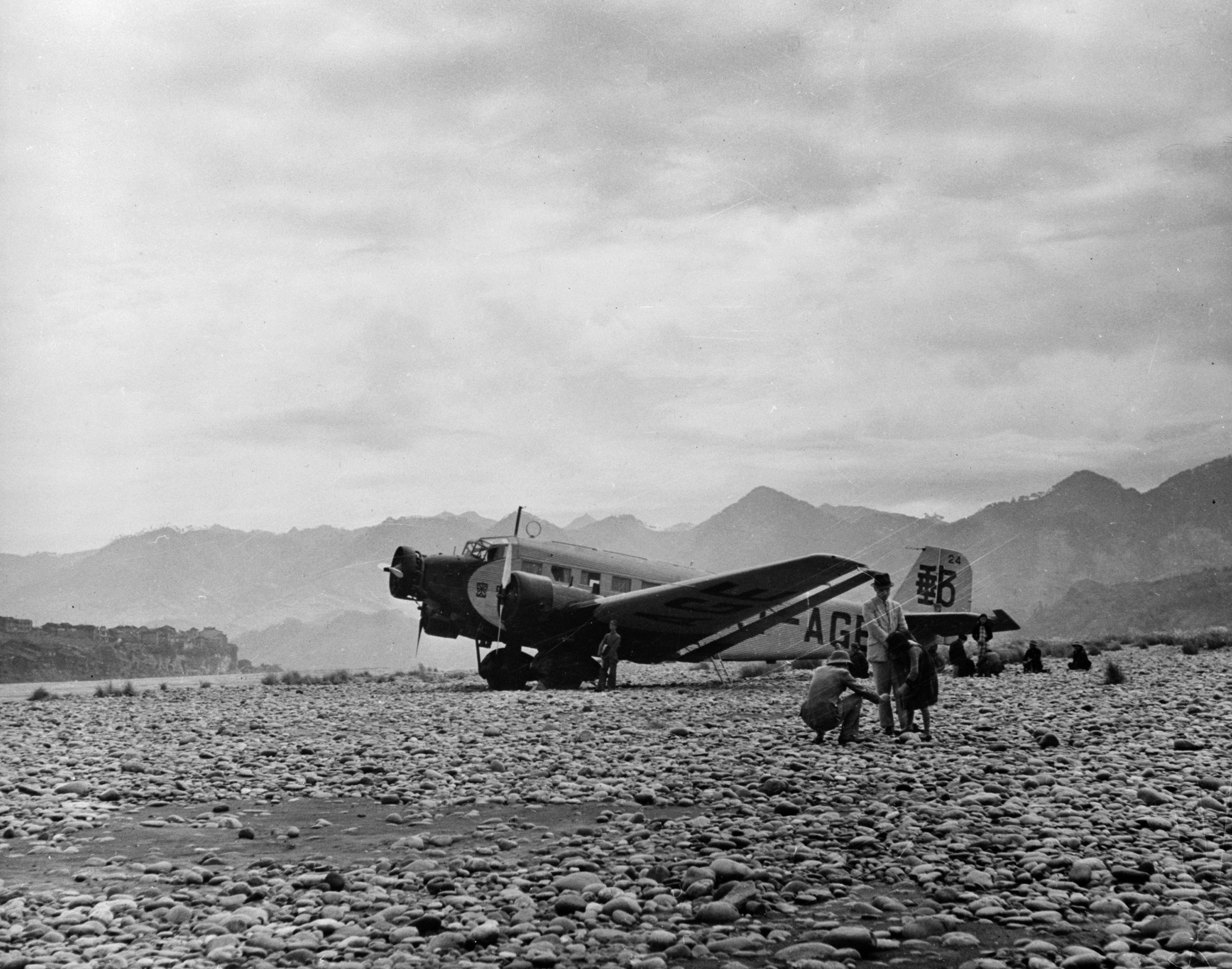
Ju 52 of Eurasia Aviation Corporation, 1930s in China

=== China National Aviation Corporation ===
- Curtiss Condor II
- de Havilland Dragon Rapide
- Douglas DC-2
- Ryan B-1 Brougham
- Stinson SM-1F Detroiter

=== Eurasia Aviation Corporation ===
- BFW M.23
- Junkers F.13
- Junkers W 33
- Junkers W 34
- Junkers A 20
- Junkers A 35
- Junkers Ju 52
- Messerschmitt M 18d

=== The Nationalist Government ===
- Avro 624 Six
- Friesley Falcon
- Handley Page Type O/7
- Vickers Vimy Commercial

=== Others ===
- Curtiss HS-2L
- Curtiss Robin
- Fleet Model 7
- Fleet Model 10
- Fokker Super Universal
- Heinkel He 116
- Klemm L 26 II
- Loening-Keystone C2H Air Yacht
- Morane-Saulnier M.S.225
- Potez 36
- Raab-Katzenstein RK.2 Pelikan
- Schoettler I
- Sikorsky S-38-BH
- Udet U 12 Flamingo

== Chinese Warlords who owns military aviation branches ==
- Bai Chongxi/Li Zongren (Guangxi Clique)
- Cao Kun/Feng Yuxiang (Zhili Clique)
- Chen Jitang (Guangdong Clique)
- Duan Qirui (Beiyang Clique)
- Liu Xiang (Sichuan Clique)
- Lu Yongxiang (Anhui Clique)
- Tang Jiyao (Yunnan Clique)
- Zhang Zuolin (Fengtian Clique)
- Sheng Shicai (Xinjiang Clique)

The aviation branches of the above warlords faction, the aircraft along with the personnel, had been voluntary incorporated into the nominally Chinese Nationalist air force by 1937 in preparations for the impending war against the Empire of Japan.

== See also ==
- Air Warfare of WWII from the Sino-Japanese War perspective
- Feng Ru
- Zee Yee Lee
- Etienne Tsu
- Wong Tsu
- Sen Yet Young
- World War II equipment used by Chinese forces
