= Feng Ru =

Chinese aviator and aircraft designer

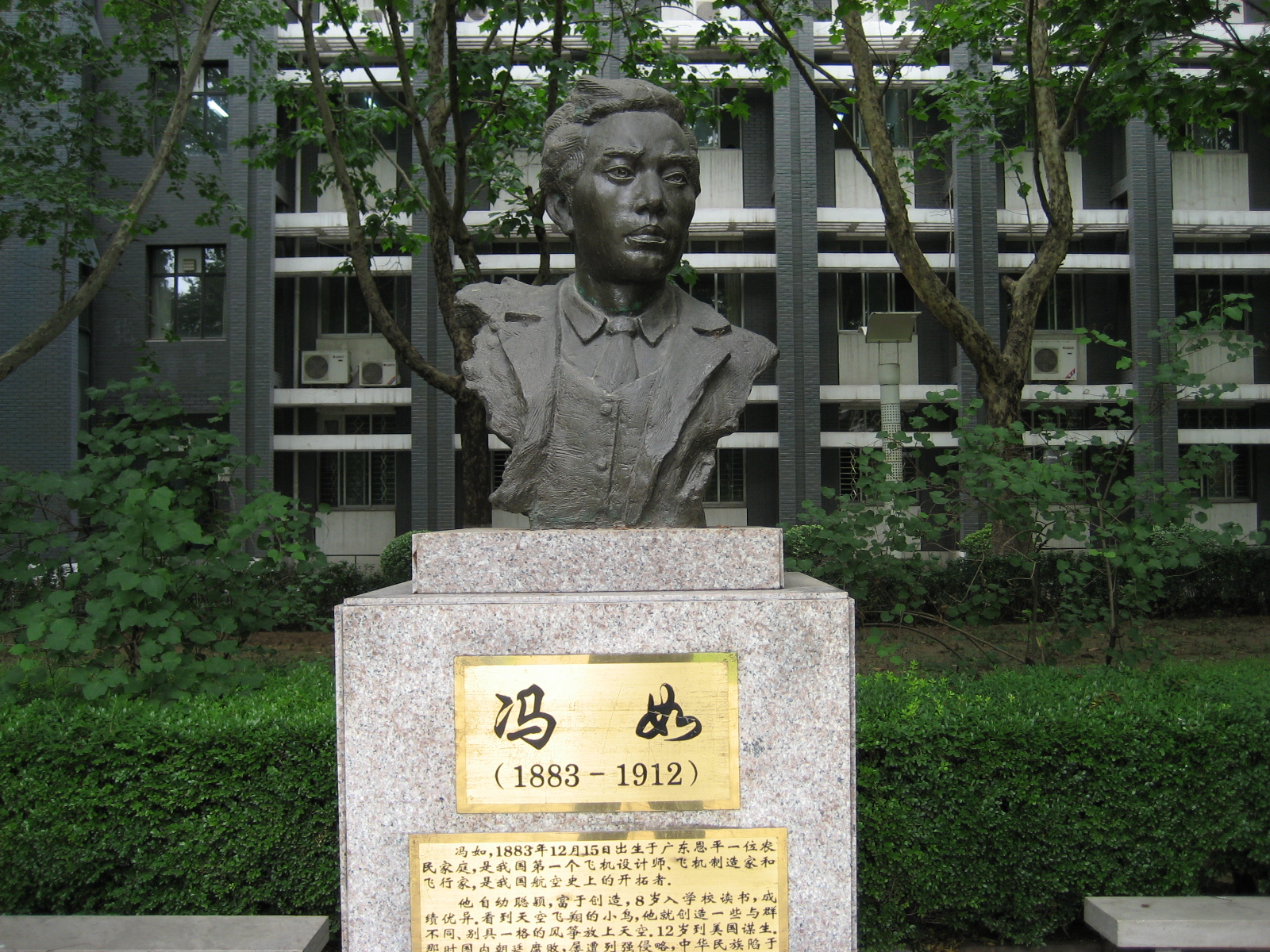
Bust of Feng Ru at Beihang University

Feng Ru (simplified Chinese: 冯如; traditional Chinese: 馮如; pinyin: Féng Rú; Jyutping: Fung4 Jyu4; 1883–1912), also known as Fung Joe Guey (Chinese: 馮珠九), was a pioneering Chinese aviator and aircraft designer.

== Life and career ==
Born in Enping, Guangdong, Fung moved to the United States at the age of twelve, living and working in various parts of California before trying to settle in San Francisco in 1906, the year that the San Francisco earthquake struck. The earthquake spoiled his plan and sent him fleeing to Oakland. Fung was fascinated by the Wright Brothers' plane and because he was always interested in machinery, one of the first things he did after arriving in Oakland was to organize Guangdong Air Vehicle Company, an airplane manufacturing company, only a few years after the Wright Brothers' Kitty Hawk flight (1903).

Within two years of founding the company in 1908, Fung constructed his first airplane, a sesquiplane with an upper span of 25 ft (7.6 m) and lower of 6 ft 3 in (1.91 m), powered by a 6 hp (4.5 kW; 6.1 PS) engine of Fung's own construction.

On September 22, 1909 (several newspapers report the date as Tuesday, September 21, 1909) Fung was the first Chinese man known to fly in America (and first aviator of any nationality to fly in California and the West Coast of the United States). He had constructed his own biplane, improving on the Wrights' blueprints. Fung flew in a wide circle, despite the harsh winds; after twenty minutes, however, the bolt holding the propeller to the shaft snapped off, and he was brought to a stop, suffering only minor bruising. The flight was reported in several papers, including The San Francisco Call and the Oakland Tribune.

== Return to China, military role and fatal crash ==
Fung returned to China on March 21, 1911, upon the request of Chinese revolutionary Sun Yat-sen, who wanted to use Fung's planes to aid the rebellion against the Qing dynasty; it is likely that he became the first-ever aviator to embark on a military mission. He was accompanied by six Oakland residents and another biplane of his own design. However, on August 26, 1912, he was killed when his plane crashed during an aerial exhibition in front of 1,000 spectators at the Yantang Airfield, Guangzhou which was permanently shut down after the tragedy. Sun Yat-sen insisted that he be buried at the Mausoleum of the 72 Huanghuagang Martyrs, and that his tomb be inscribed with the words "Pioneer of Chinese Aviation".

== Legacy ==
On September 21, 2009, a bronze bust of Fung, the "Father of Chinese Aviation", was unveiled in a ceremony at Laney College in Oakland. One of Fung's workshops, where he designed and built parts of his biplane, was on a site that is now part of the Laney campus, near the heart of commercial Chinatown. The event was organized by Steve Lavoie of the Oakland Public Library and Lieutenant-Colonel Roger Glenn of Amelia Earhart Senior Squadron 188, Civil Air Patrol.

The book Dragonwings is partially inspired by Fung Joe Guey.

== See also ==
- Zee Yee Lee
- Senyet Young
- Zhu Binhou
- Kwon Ki-ok
- Aircraft of China both civil and military use from 1937 and before
