= Friesley Falcon =

Falcon

General information
- Type: Airliner
- National origin: United States
- Manufacturer: Friesley
- Designer: Bond M. Spencer
- Number built: 1

History
- First flight: 17 April 1921

The Friesley Falcon was a twin engine, 12 passenger biplane airliner, designed and flown in the United States in 1921. The only example built was later sold to China.

== Design and development ==
The Falcon was funded by Harold Friesley, a farmer on land along Route 70 between Oroville and Marysville in California. It was designed and first flown by Bond Spencer. A large, three bay biplane, its equal span wings had no stagger or sweep. On each wing the outer bay was defined by simple parallel pairs of interplane struts and the inner wing was divided by the engine mounting, which placed each 400 hp (300 kW) V-12 Liberty L-12 engine and its square, front mounted radiator halfway between the wings. Ailerons, projecting slightly beyond the wing tips, were fitted on both upper and lower wings. The lower wing was mounted on the bottom fuselage longerons, with an inter plane gap of 7 ft 6 in (2.29 m), the upper plane passed over the top of the fuselage, supported by cabane struts.

The fuselage of the Falcon was rectangular in cross-section and flat sided apart from a slightly curved decking. It was almost entirely plywood covered. The nose had a simple, rounded, single curvature covering and formed the pilot's enclosed cockpit, with deep, almost continuous, vertical windows and another transparency in the roof. Six rows of wicker seats, separated by a central aisle, accommodated the twelve passengers in the front part of the fuselage behind the pilot, in a space 4 ft 8 in (1.42 m) wide and 5 ft 8 in (1.73 m) high. Behind this windowed cabin was a baggage store measuring 4 ft 5 in (1.35 m) wide by 4 ft 0 in (1.22 m). The tailplane was mounted low down on the fuselage, carrying a pair of triangular fins with isosceles trapezoidal rudders. Both rudders and elevators were balanced and the tailplane incidence could be adjusted in-flight.

The Falcon had a fixed conventional undercarriage with twin sprung mainwheels under the engines and a rubber sprung tailskid. The first flight - of about two minutes - was made from Friesley Field on 17 April 1921. A second equally short flight was made that day and the first public flight made the following day.

== Operational history ==
The Falcon did not reach production, but the sole machine did make some of the earliest U.S. commercial passenger flights. These were from Gridley, California to San Francisco and Marysville. The Falcon is claimed to be the first aircraft to take a complete baseball team, the Marysville Merchants, to their game. This flight was in August 1921.

On 24 May 1922 the Falcon was sold to the Chinese government for $3,000; there are no later details of its history.

== Specifications ==
Data from Flight 5 January 1922

General characteristics

- Crew: 1
- Capacity: 12 passengers
- Length: 40 ft 0 in (12.19 m)
- Wingspan: 65 ft 3 in (19.89 m)
- Height: 15 ft 0 in (4.57 m)
- Wing area: 897 sq ft (83.3 m^{2})
- Airfoil: U.S.A. 5
- Empty weight: 5,600 lb (2,540 kg)
- Gross weight: 8,600 lb (3,901 kg)
- Fuel capacity: 40 US gal (33.3 Imp gal; 151 L)
- Powerplant: 2 × Liberty L-12 V-12 cylinder, water cooled, low compression, 400 hp (300 kW) each
- Propellers: 2-bladed Paragon, 9 ft 0 in (2.74 m) diameter , pitch 7 ft (2.1 m)

Performance

- Maximum speed: 120 mph (190 km/h, 100 kn)
- Cruise speed: 90 mph (140 km/h, 78 kn)
- Stall speed: 55 mph (89 km/h, 48 kn)
- Time to altitude: 4 min to 5,000 ft (1,500 m)
- Wing loading: 9.3 lb/sq ft (45 kg/m^{2})
