= Sen Yet Young =

Chinese aviation pioneer

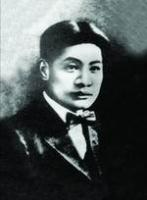
- Traditional Chinese: 楊仙逸
- Simplified Chinese: 杨仙逸
Transcriptions
Standard Mandarin
- Hanyu Pinyin: Yáng Xiānyì
- Wade–Giles: Yang Hsien-i
Yue: Cantonese
- IPA: Young Sen Yet

Sen Yet Young (Chinese: 楊仙逸; pinyin: Yáng Xiānyì; Wade–Giles: Yang Hsien-i; 1891–1923), also known as Young Sen Yat, was a Chinese aviation pioneer born in the Kingdom of Hawaii.

== Biography ==
Young was born in the Kingdom of Hawaii in 1891. His father, Young Ahin (Yang Zhukun), emigrated to Hawaii in 1872, aged 19, from present-day Zhongshan. Young Ahin’s hometown village of Buck Toy (Bei Tai 北臺) was close to the Sun Yat-sen family village of Cui Heng; they spoke the same Zhongshan dialect, were good friends, business partners and could plan secrets of Chinese revolution activities from Hawaii.

Young Ahin became a citizen of the kingdom of Hawaii and prospered. He spoke Hawaiian and some English, started as a bok choy grower, then rice planting, owning rice plantations, rice mills, poultry farms as well as transport of them. In addition to owning residential, and commercial real estate properties. In essence, he became a self-made Hawaiian-American-Chinese millionaire owning every business.

Sun Yat-sen sought funds from and often stayed at the home of Young Ahin. He and his youngest son were staunch supporters of Sun’s revolutionary efforts for the overthrow of the Manchu Qing Dynasty and later unification of China from its warring factions. Sen Yet Young was given the first name, in reverse order, of Sun Yat-sen.

At the age of 11, Sen Yet Young pledged to support the cause of a democratic, unified China. At 18, he became a member of the Tongmenghui, while Young Ahin served as the treasurer of the Tongmenghui chapter in Honolulu and later also Treasurer of The National Fundraising Bureau of China.

Sen Yet Young assisted in unifying China by heeding Sun's call to "save China through aviation". He enrolled in the Curtiss Aviation School in Buffalo, New York and soloed as a pilot on October 2, 1916. Sen Yet Young became the first Hawaiian American to be licensed, with sea plane and land plane ratings, receiving the Aero Club of America certificates 600 and 62 respectively. He won second place in marksmanship from an airplane and stayed months longer studying aviation engineering.

Young was named head of the Chinese Aviation Bureau and is credited with producing the first flourishing of aviation experts in Guangdong. He spearheaded the first Chinese factory to manufacture airplanes, and commanded the design and building of the famed Rosamonde, named after Sun's wife, Soong Ching-ling; Mme. Soong would fly as a passenger in the Rosamonde with pilot Huang Guangrui at the controls.

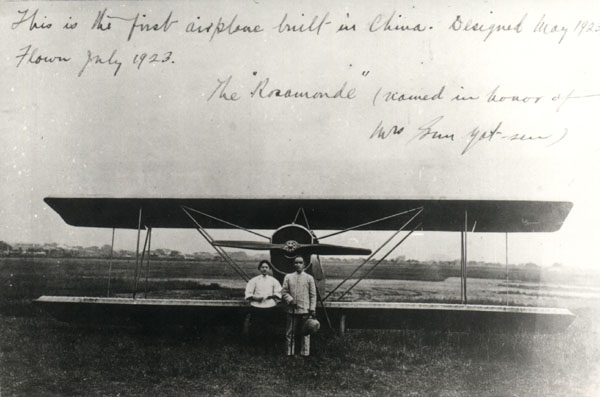
The Rosamonde biplane, shown here with Soong Ching-ling and Sun Yat-sen standing before the plane

On 20 September 1923, Young died from a torpedo explosion at the age of 31. Sun announced the establishment of a National Aviation Day on the day of his death and urged a school to be started in his name. Young is memorialized at the Chinese Martyrs Cemetery Park Huanghuagang 黄花岗公园; Sun Yat Sen called Young "The Father of Chinese Aviation."

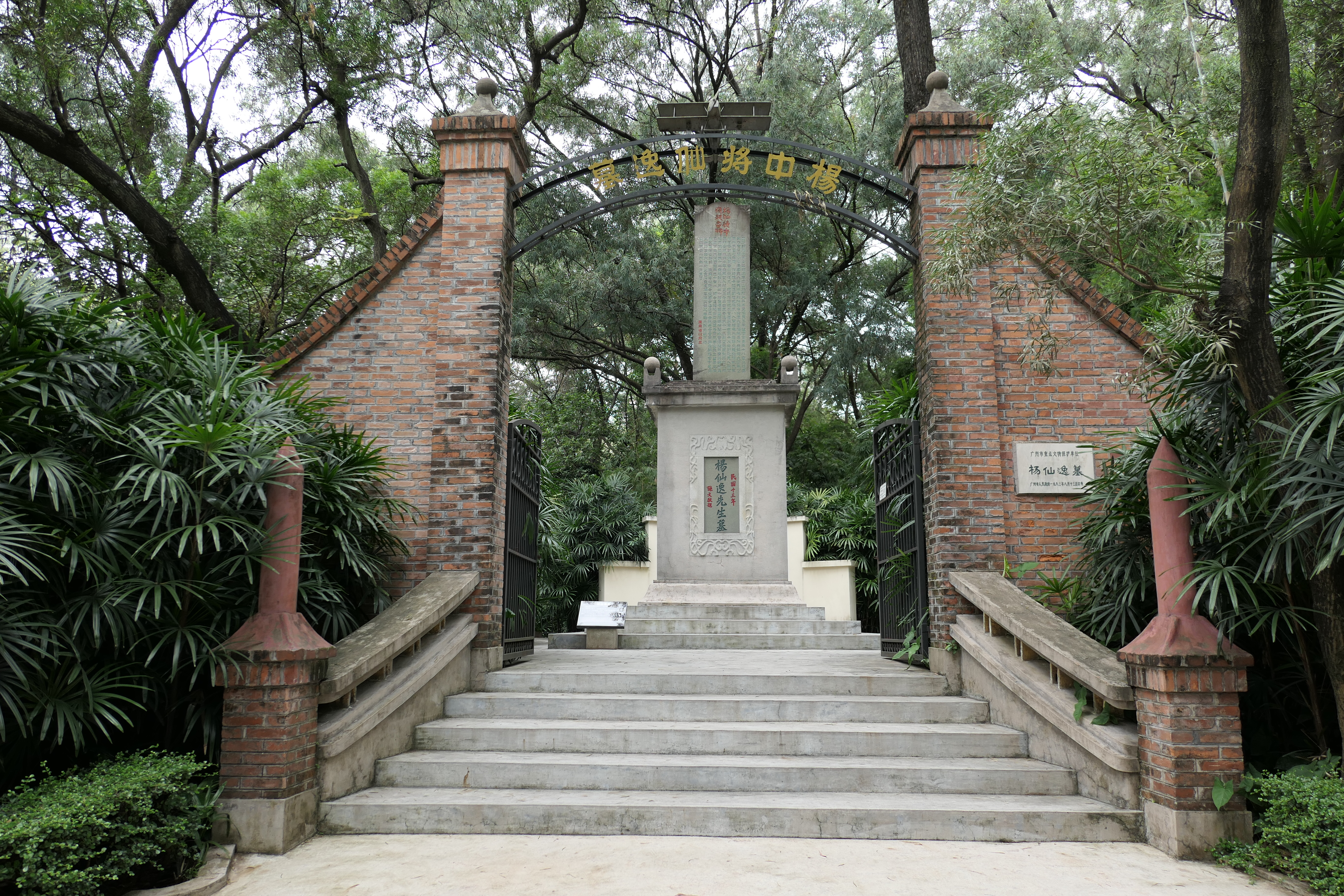
Tomb of Sen-yet Young in the Huanghuagang Cemetery of the 72 Marytrs Park in Canton, China.

== See also ==
- Feng Ru
- Civil and military aircraft in China from 1937 and before
- Development of the Nationalist Air Force of China; the combined effort of overseas Chinese volunteer pilots and former warlord air force units joining the central authority of the Republic of China Air Force for the War of Resistance/World War II against the Imperial Japanese invasion from 1937-1945
