= Jianghehui station =

Metro station in Hangzhou, China

Jianghehui 江河汇
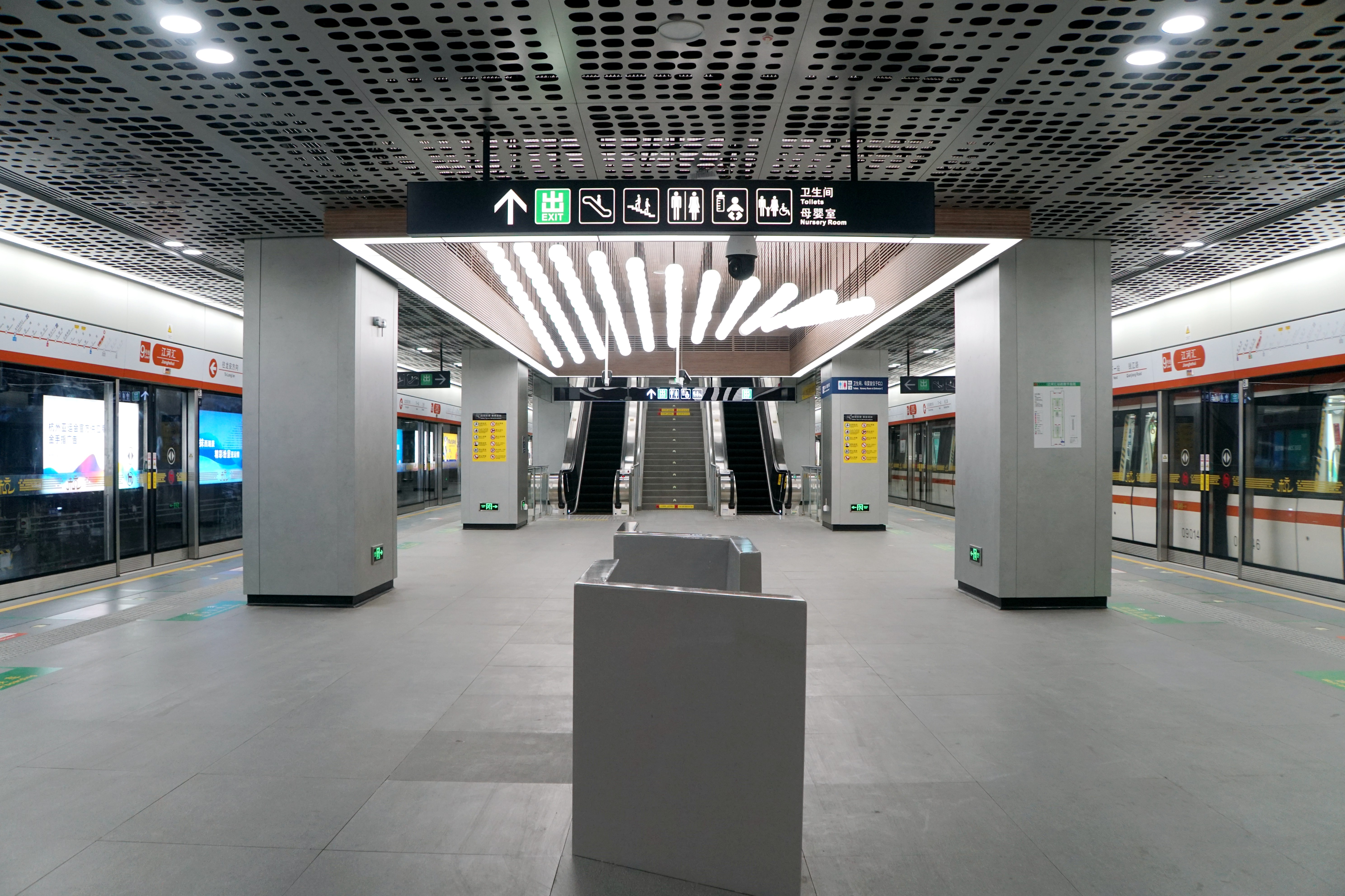
- Platform

General information
- Location: Qianjiang Road (钱江路) × Sanxin Road (三新路); Shangcheng District, Hangzhou, Zhejiang; China
- Coordinates: 30°15′49″N 120°13′01″E
- Operated by: Hangzhou Metro Corporation
- Line: Line 9
- Platforms: 2 (1 island platform)

Construction
- Structure type: Underground
- Accessible: Yes

History
- Opened: 1 April 2022

Services
Preceding station	Hangzhou Metro	Following station
Qianjiang Road towards Guanyintang	Line 9	Sanbao towards Long'an
Fengbei towards Yatai Road	Line 15 Under Construction	Jingfang towards Chongxian
Location

Jianghehui (simplified Chinese: 江河汇; traditional Chinese: 江河匯) is a metro station of Line 9 of the Hangzhou Metro in China. It is located in Shangcheng District of Hangzhou. The station was opened on 1 April 2022.

== Station layout ==
G	Ground level	Exits
B1	Concourse	Tickets, Customer Service Center
B2		← Line 9 towards Guanyintang (Qianjiang Road)
B2	Island platform, doors open on the left
B2		Line 9 towards Long'an (Sanbao) →

=== Entrances/exits ===
- A: south side of Qianjiang Road, east side of Sanxin Road

== Design ==
Jianghehui Station is located near the ancient seawall site, which dates back to the Song dynasty's Chaitang and the Ming and Qing dynasties' fish-scale stone seawalls, each embodying the wisdom of the ancient laborers. The station draws inspiration from the historical and cultural essence of Chaitang and the fish-scale stone seawalls, reinterpreting their forms using modern materials to showcase the historical evolution and cultural significance of the ancient seawalls.

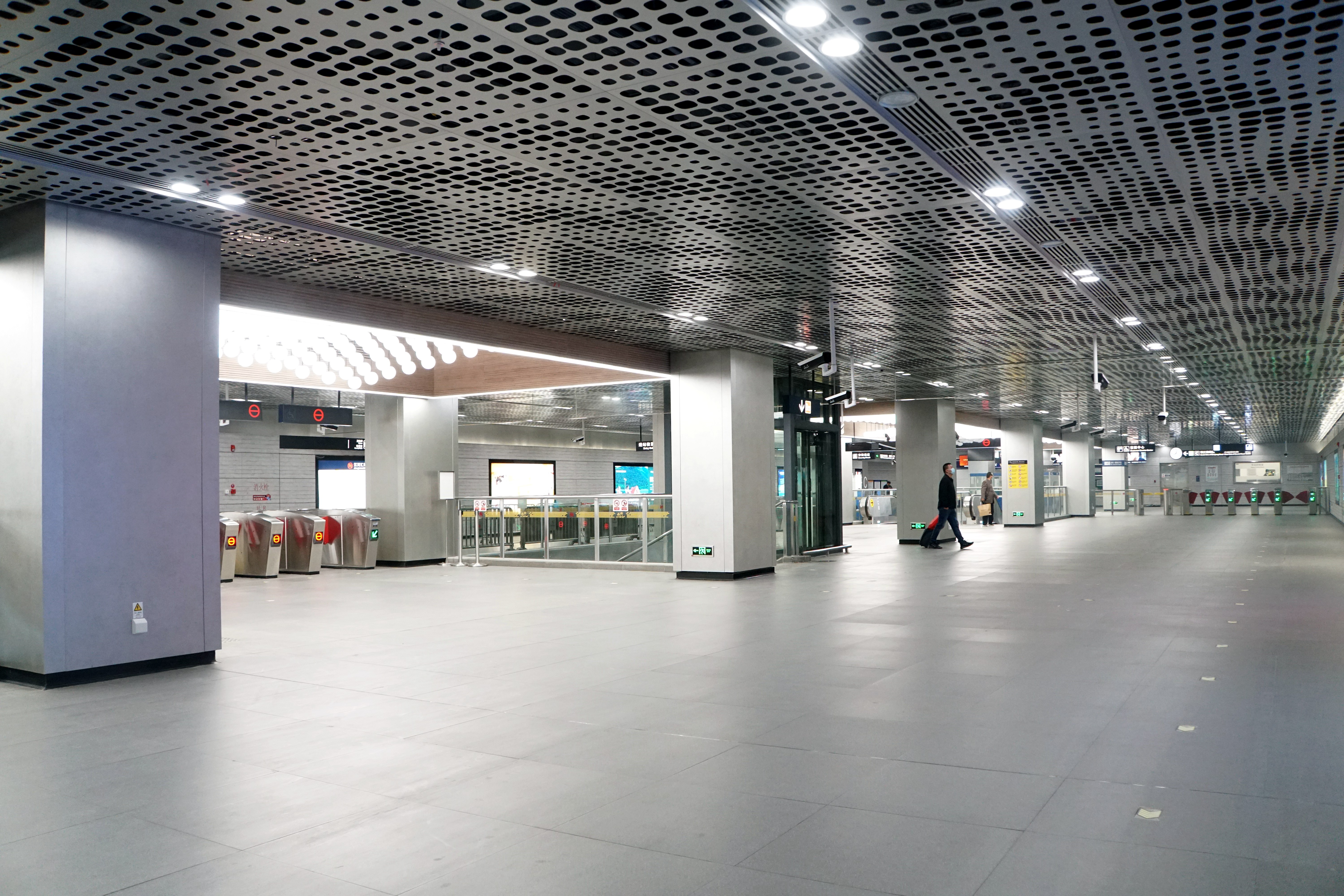
Concourse

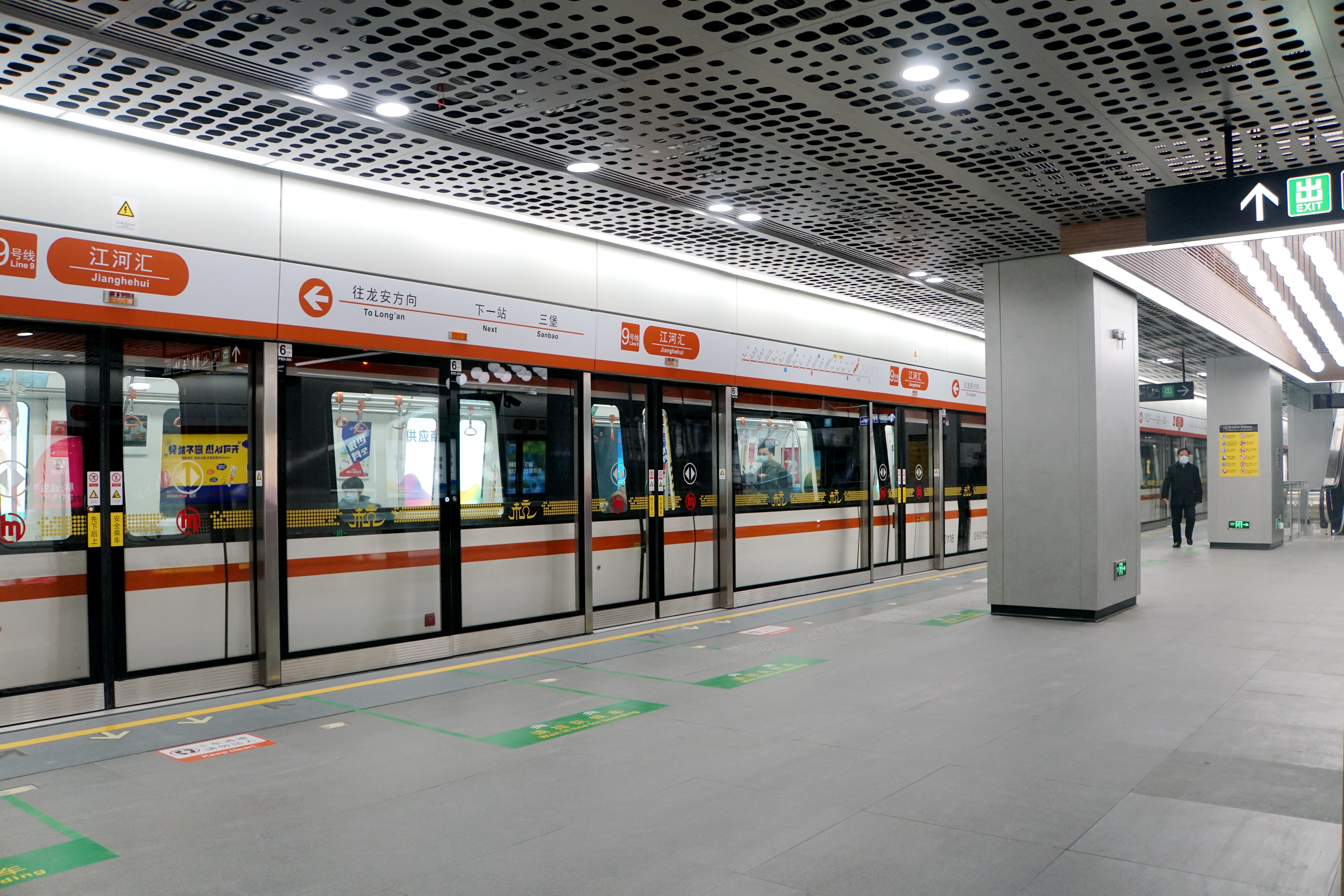
Platform

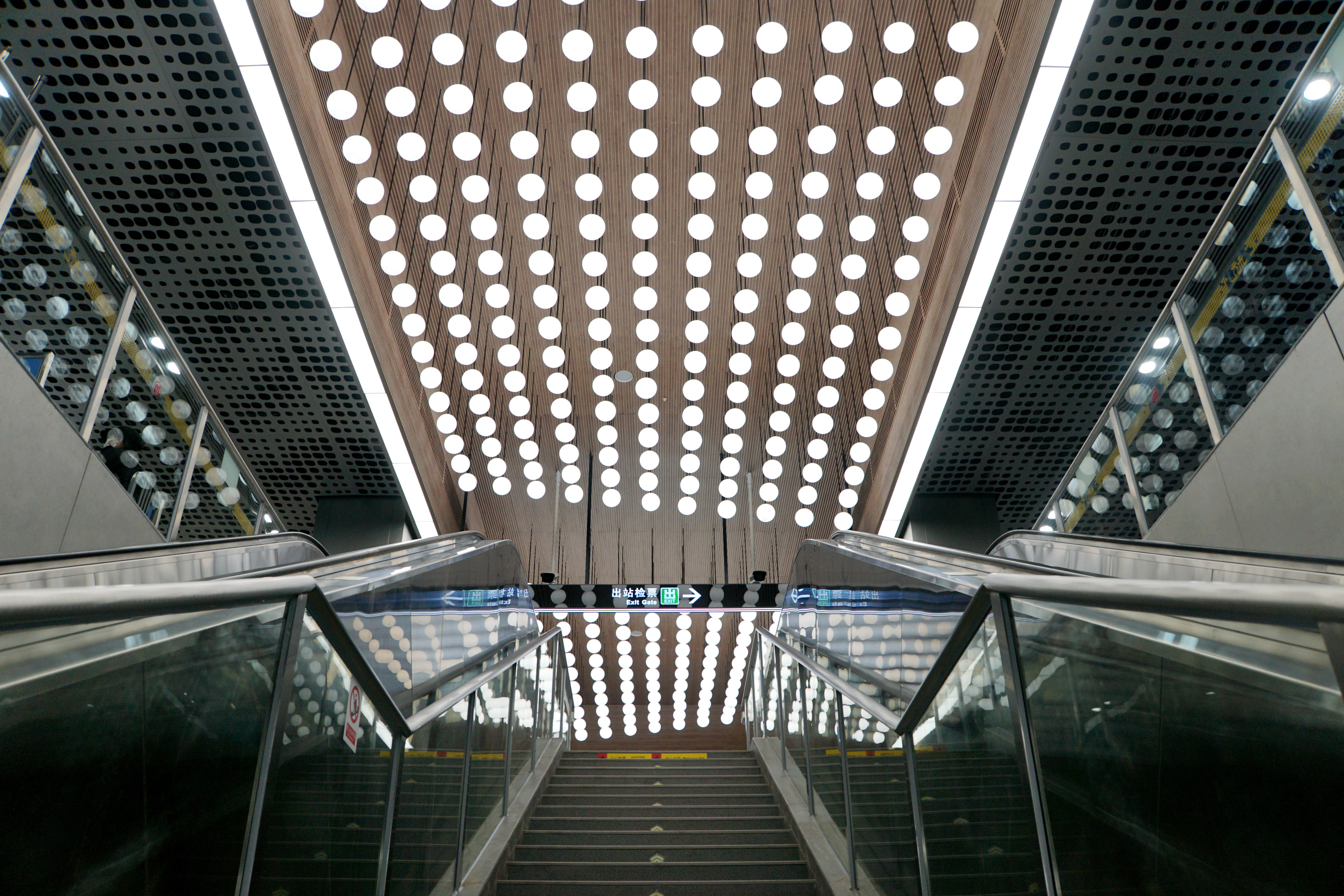
Light decoration

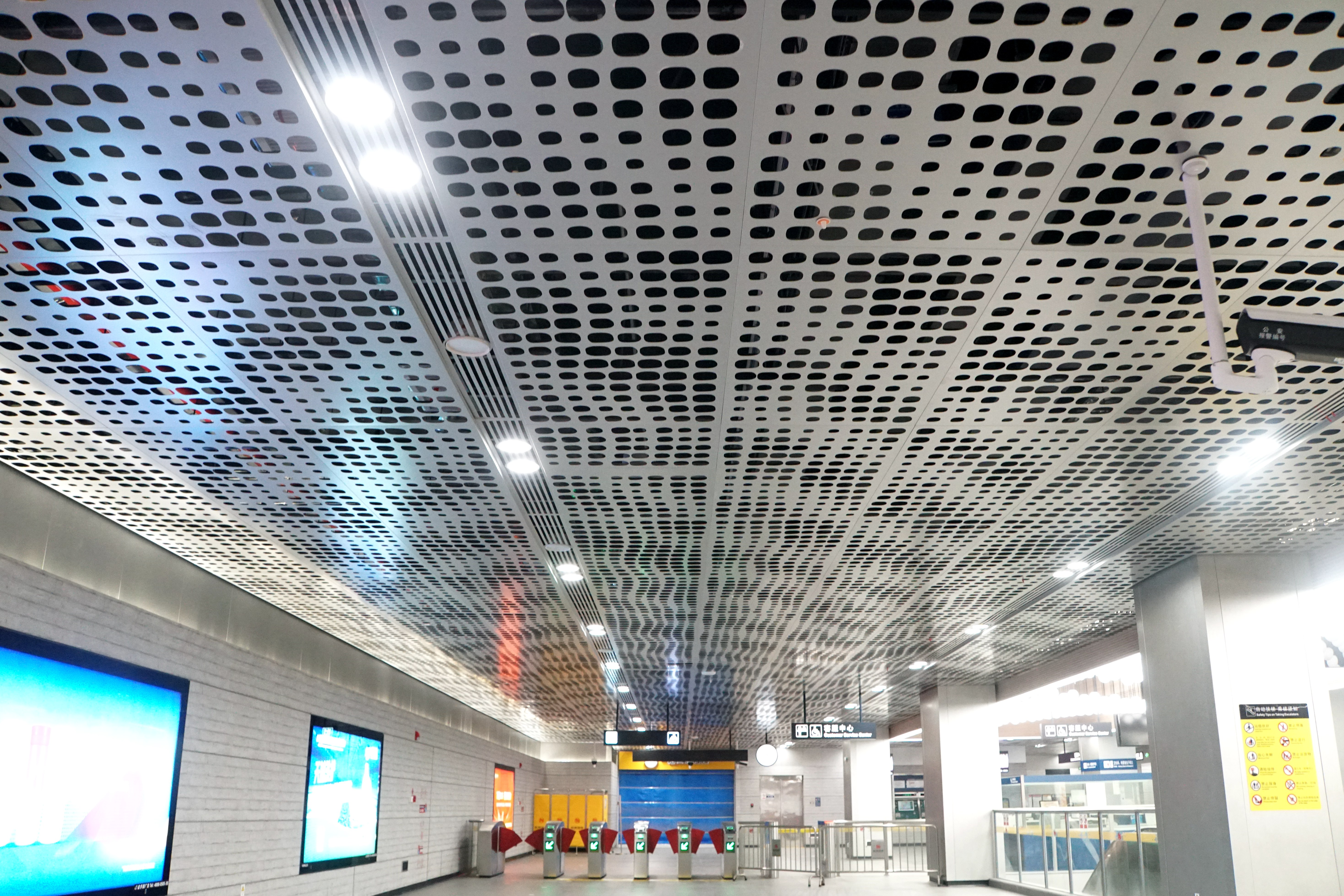
Ceiling

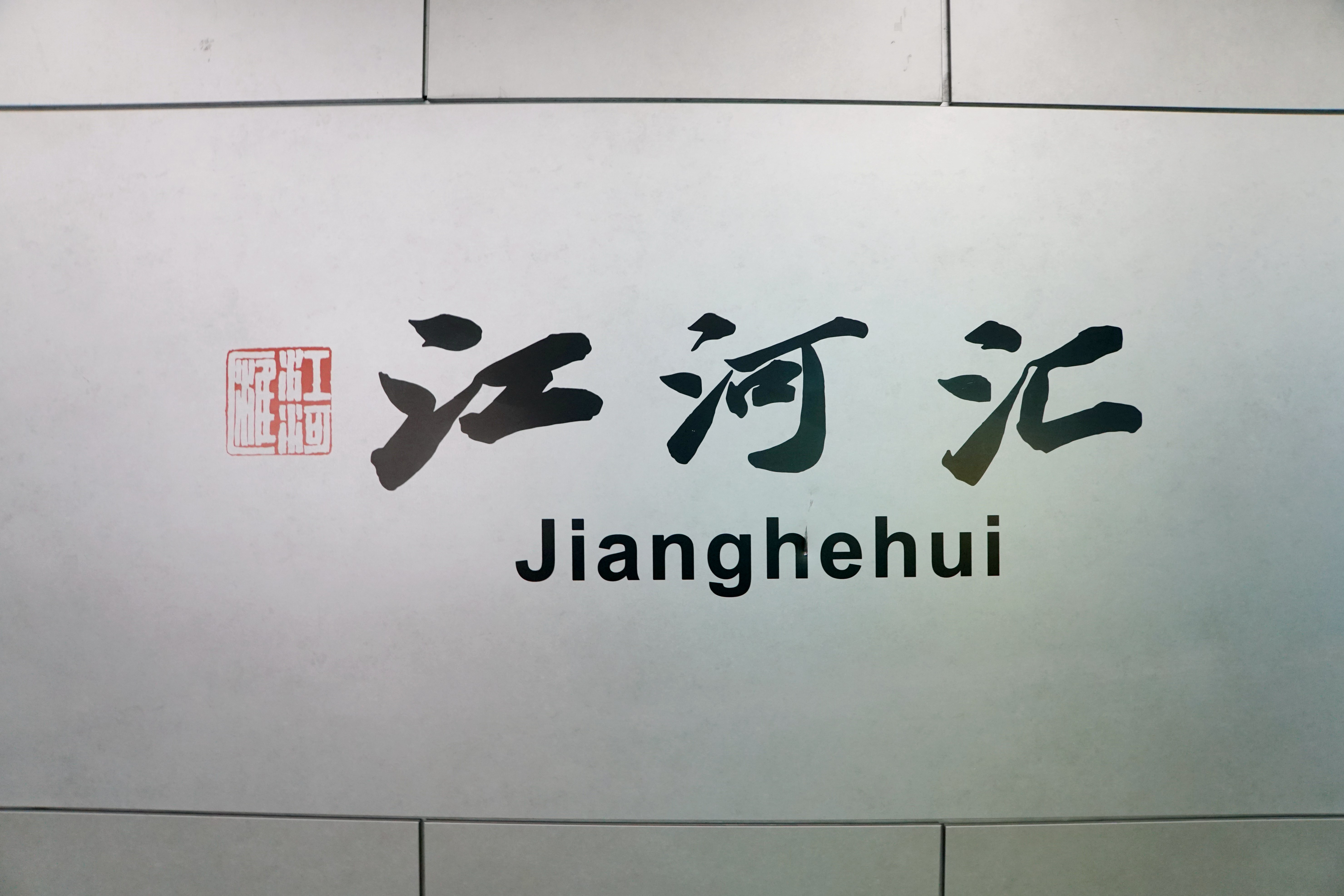
Name board
