= Xinye Road station =

Metro station in Hangzhou, China

Coordinates: 30°15′4.658″N 120°12′14.072″E

Xinye Road 新业路
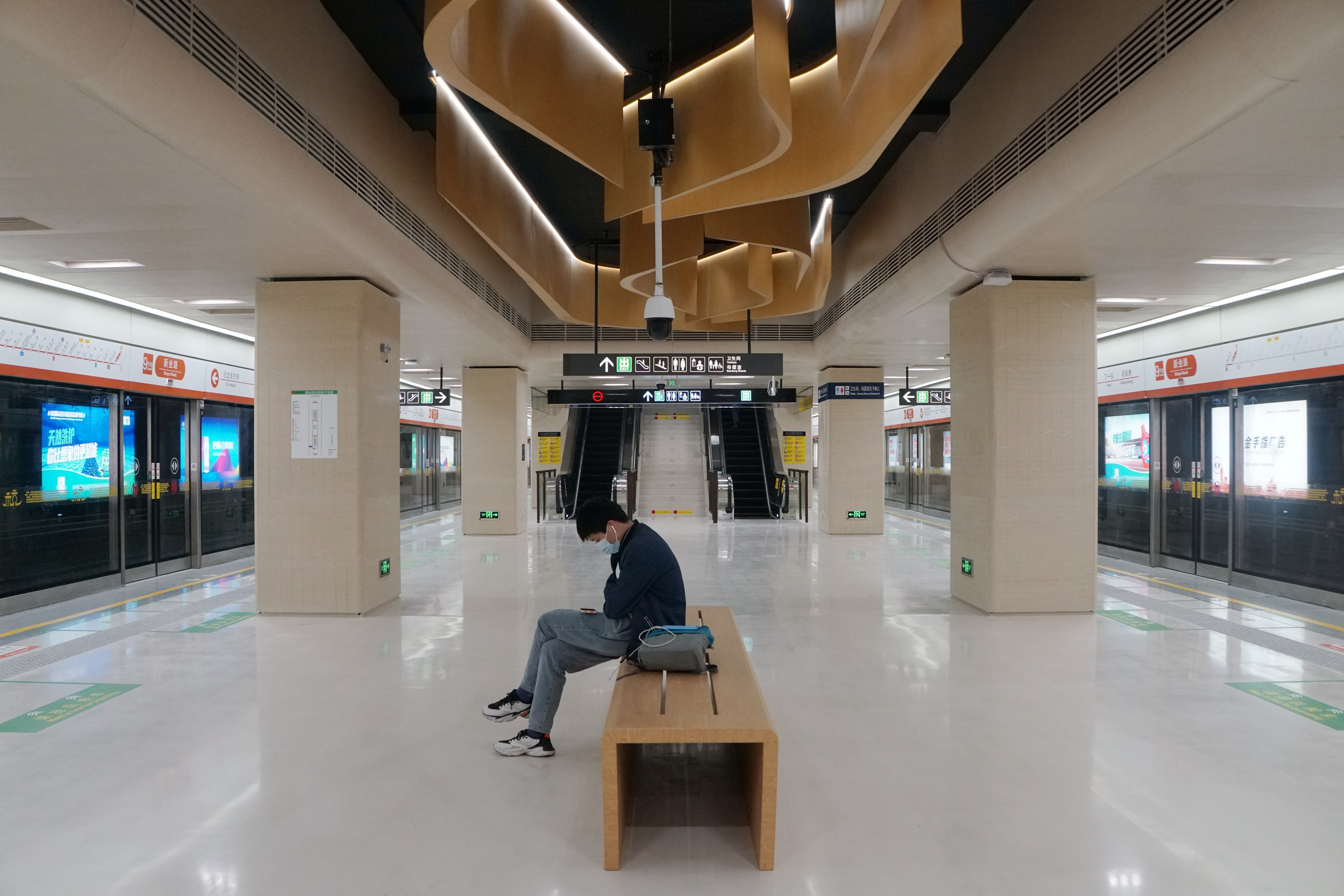
- Platform

General information
- Location: Shangcheng District, Hangzhou, Zhejiang; China
- Operated by: Hangzhou Metro Corporation
- Line(s): Line 9
- Platforms: 2 (1 island platform)

History
- Opened: 1 April 2022

Services
| Preceding station | Hangzhou Metro | Following station |
|---|---|---|
| Guanyintang Terminus | Line 9 | Qianjiang Road towards Long'an |

Xinye Road (Chinese: 新业路) is a metro station of Line 9 of the Hangzhou Metro in China. It is located in Shangcheng District of Hangzhou. The station was opened on 1 April 2022.

== Gallery ==
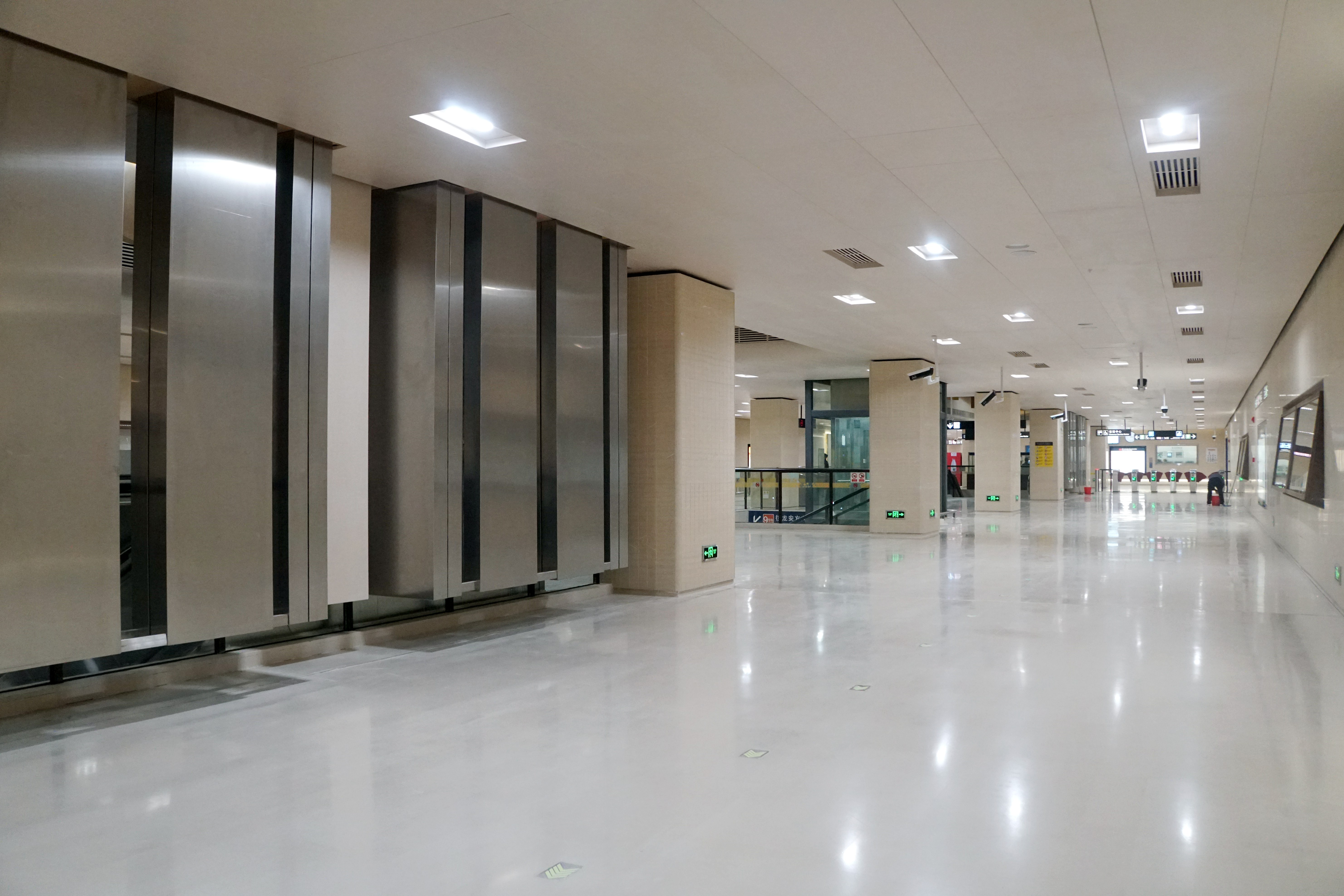
Concourse

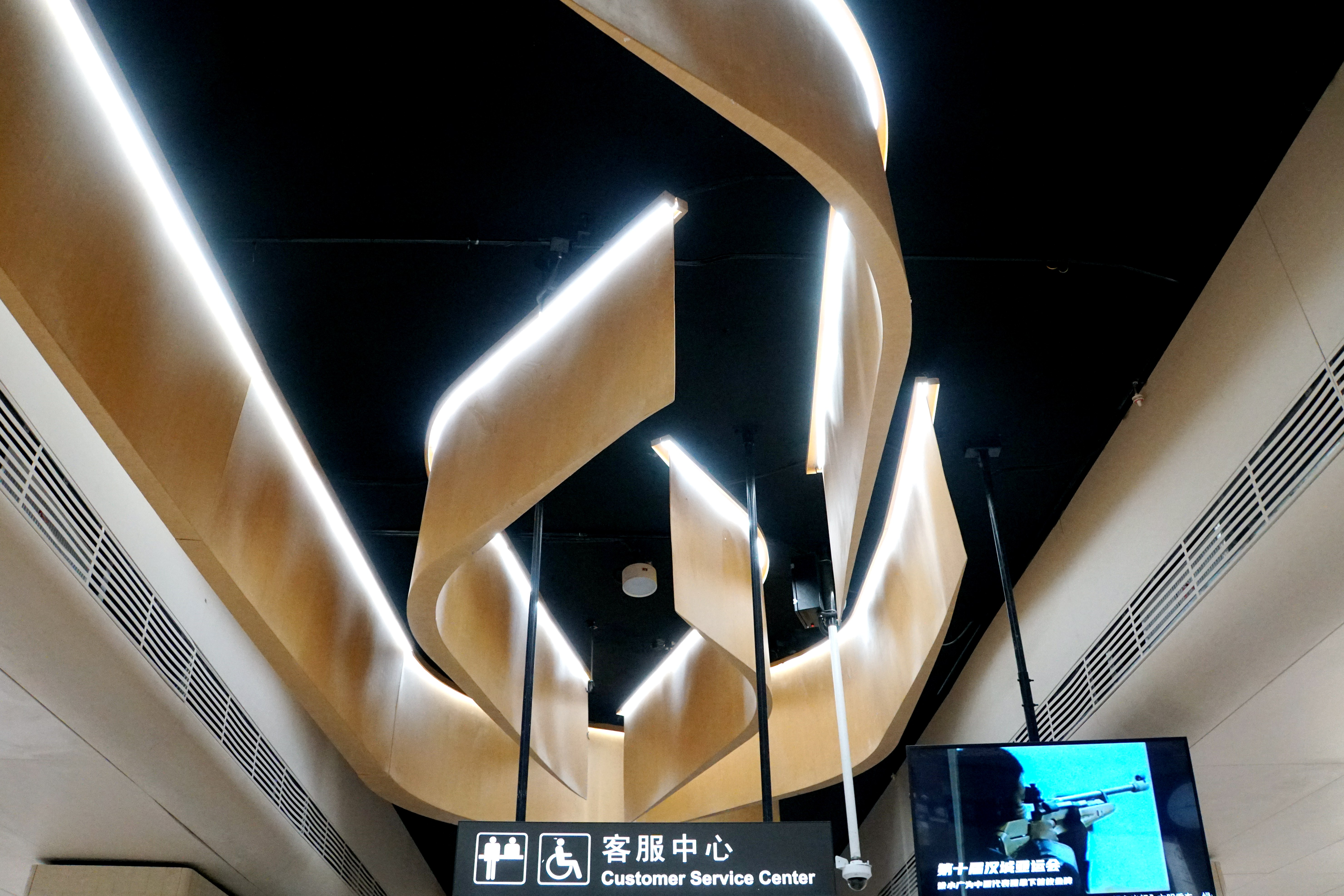
Ceiling

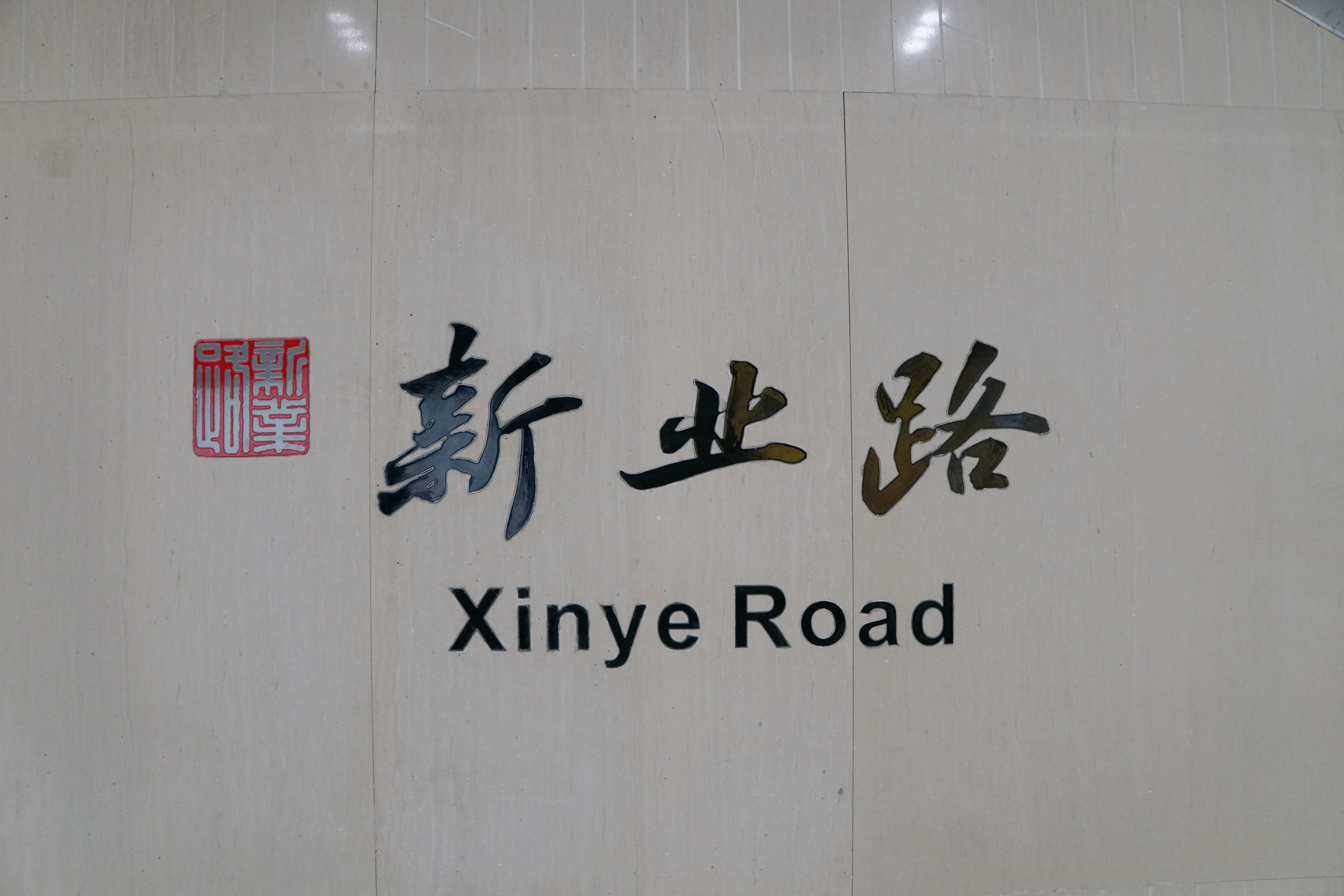
Name Board
