= Jiangjin Road station =

Metro station in Hangzhou, China

Coordinates: 30°15′07″N 120°12′40″E

Jiangjin Road 江锦路
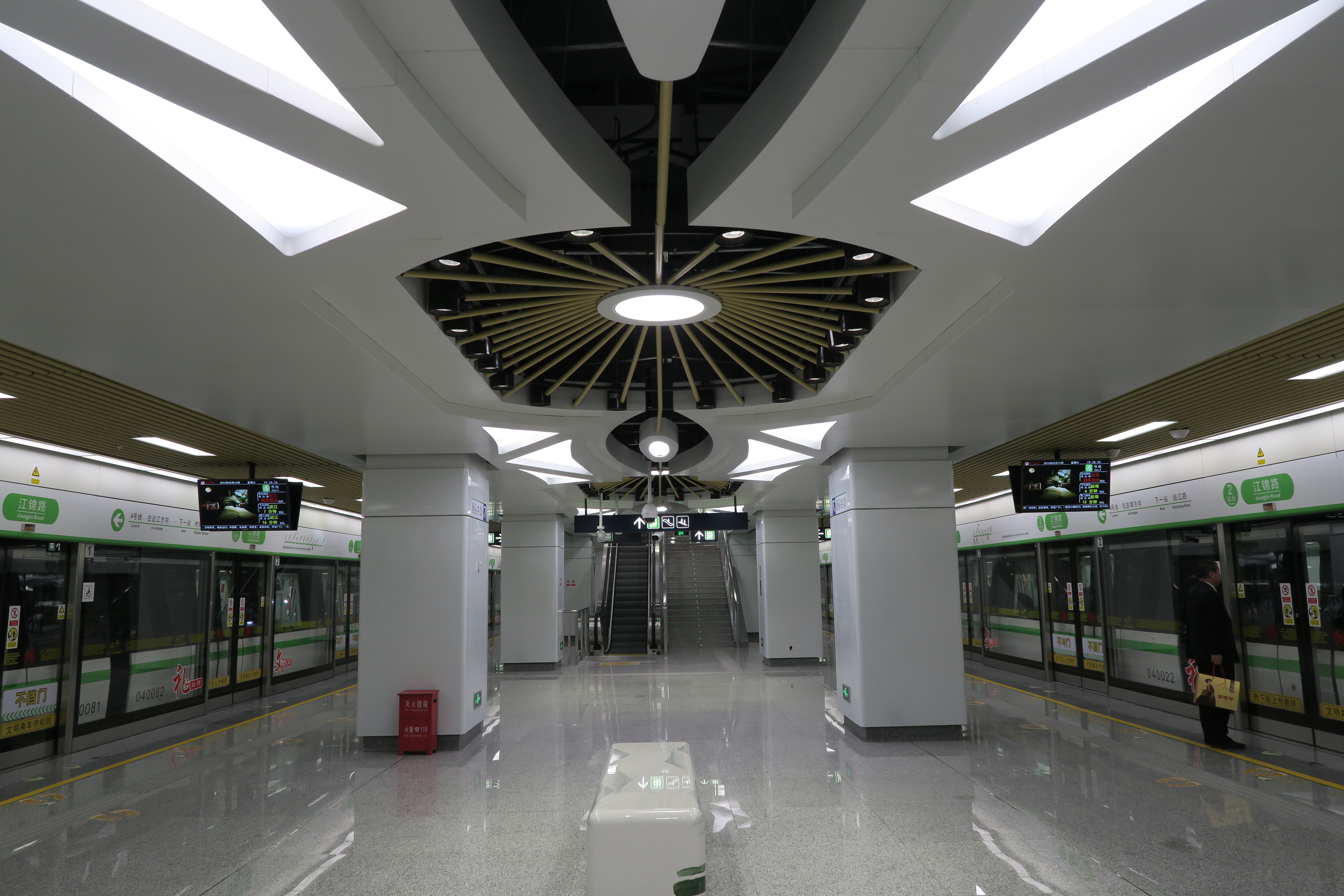
- Platform

General information
- Location: Jianggan District, Hangzhou, Zhejiang; China
- Operated by: Hangzhou Metro Corporation
- Line(s): Line 4
- Platforms: 2 (1 island platform)

History
- Opened: February 2, 2015

Services
Preceding station	Hangzhou Metro	Following station
Citizen Center towards Puyan	Line 4	Qianjiang Road towards Chihua Street

Jiangjin Road (Chinese: 江锦路) is a metro station on Line 4 of the Hangzhou Metro in China. It is located in the Jianggan District of Hangzhou.
