= Qianjiang Road station =

Hangzhou Metro station

Coordinates: 30°15′30″N 120°12′29″E

Qianjiang Road 钱江路
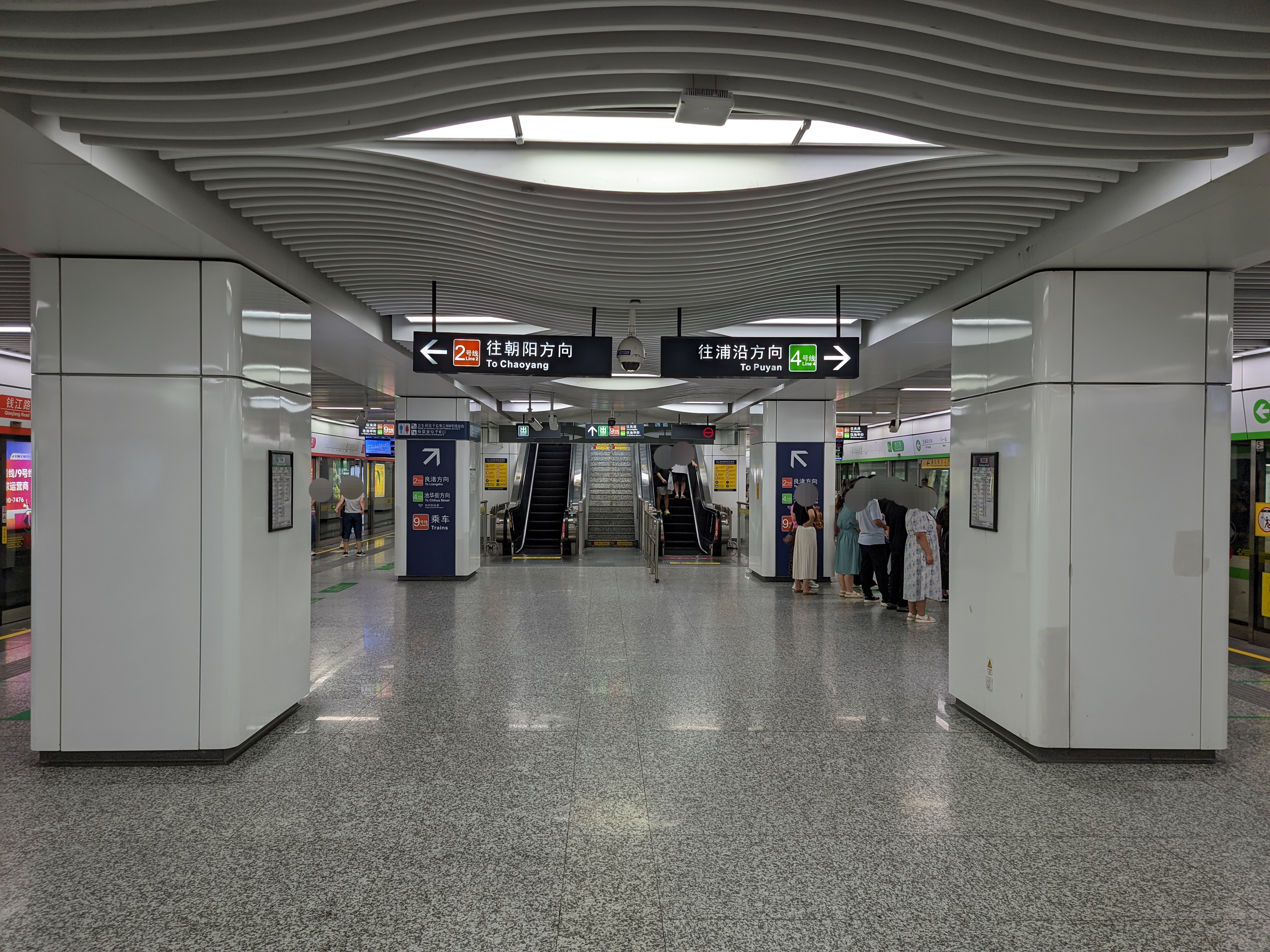
- Platforms for Line 2 towards Chaoyang and Line 4 towards Puyan

General information
- Location: Shangcheng District, Hangzhou, Zhejiang; China
- Operated by: Hangzhou Metro Corporation
- Lines: Line 2; Line 4; Line 9

History
- Opened: November 24, 2014 (Line 2); February 2, 2015 (Line 4); April 1, 2022 (Line 9)

Services
Preceding station	Hangzhou Metro	Following station
Qianjiang Century City towards Chaoyang	Line 2	Qingchun Square towards Liangzhu
Jiangjin Road towards Puyan	Line 4	Jingfang towards Chihua Street
Xinye Road towards Guanyintang	Line 9	Jianghehui towards Long'an
Location

Qianjiang Road (Chinese: 钱江路) is a transfer station on Line 2, Line 4 and Line 9 of the Hangzhou Metro in China. It is located in the Shangcheng District of Hangzhou. This station offers cross-platform interchange between Line 2 and Line 4.

== Station layout ==
G		Exits
B1	Concourse	Transfer passage, Tickets, Customer Service Center, Metro Shops
B2	←	█ Line 4 towards Puyan (Jiangjin Road)
B2	Island Platform
B2	←	█ Line 2 towards Chaoyang (Qianjiang Century City)
B2		█ Line 2 towards Liangzhu (Qingchun Square)	→
B2	Island Platform
B2		█ Line 4 towards Chihua Street (Jingfang)	→
B3	Side Platform, doors will open on the right
B3	←	█ Line 9 towards Guanyintang (Xinye Road)
B3	Side Platform, doors will open on the left
B3		█ Line 9 towards Long'an (Jianghehui)	→

== Entrances/exits ==
There are 9 exits. Exit A — Exit D belong to Line 2 and Line 4, Exit E and F belong to Line 9. Although Exit D1 was built, it's not in public access up to now.

- A: north side of Qingchun Rd. (E), Shunfu Rd.
- B: south side of Qingchun Rd. (E), Shunfu Rd.
- C: south side of Qingchun Rd. (E), west side of Qianjiang Rd.
- D_{1}: south side of Qingchun Rd. (E), west side of Qianjiang Rd.
- D_{2}: south side of Qingchun Rd. (E), east side of Qianjiang Rd.
- D_{3}: north side of Qingchun Rd. (E), east side of Qianjiang Rd., Qinghe Rd.
- D_{4}: north side of Qingchun Rd. (E), west side of Qianjiang Rd., Park Hyatt Hangzhou, China Resources Building, The Mixc
- E: west side of Qianjiang Rd., Jiangjin Rd.
- F: east side of Qianjiang Rd., Jiangjin Rd.
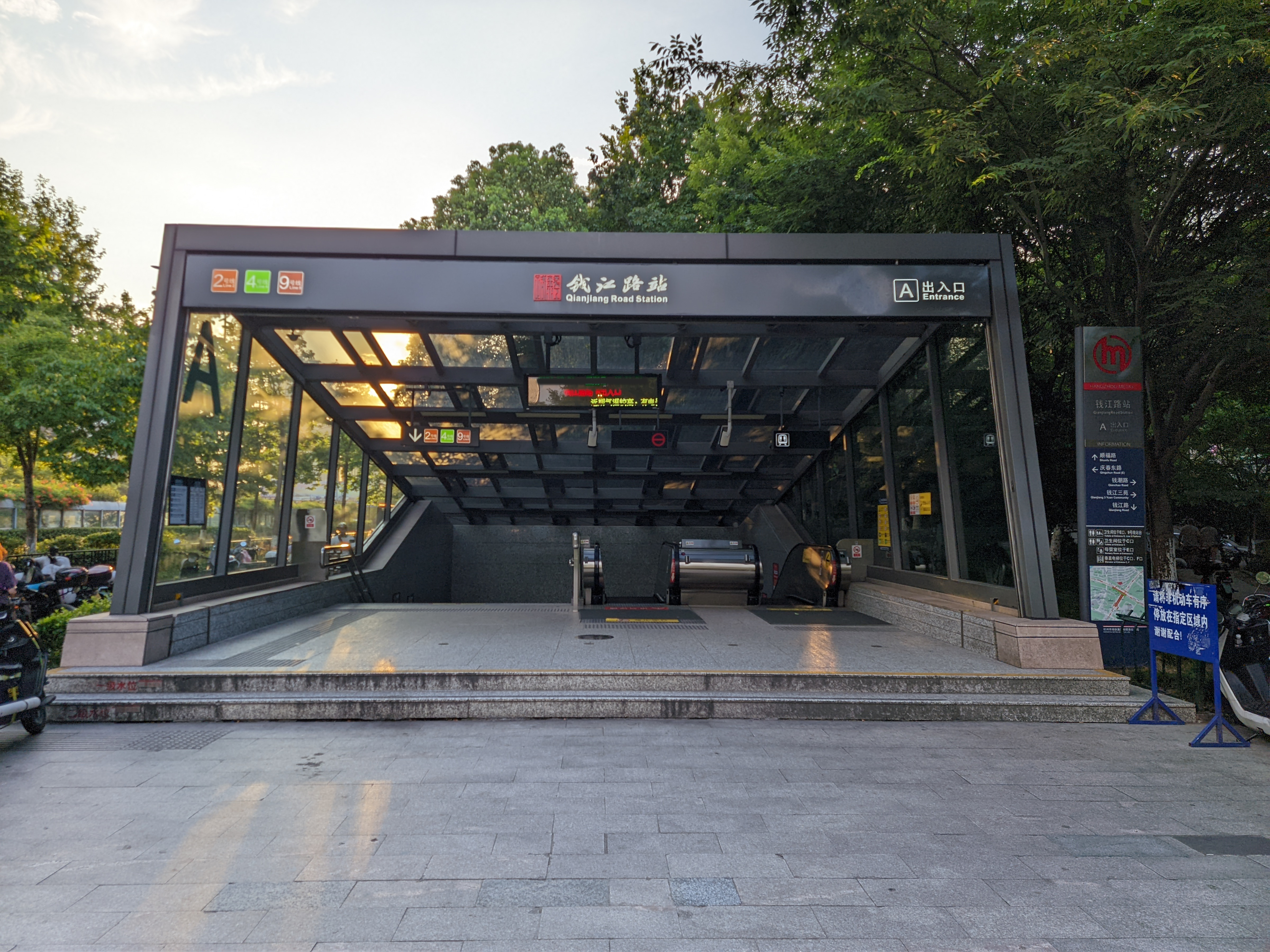
Exit A

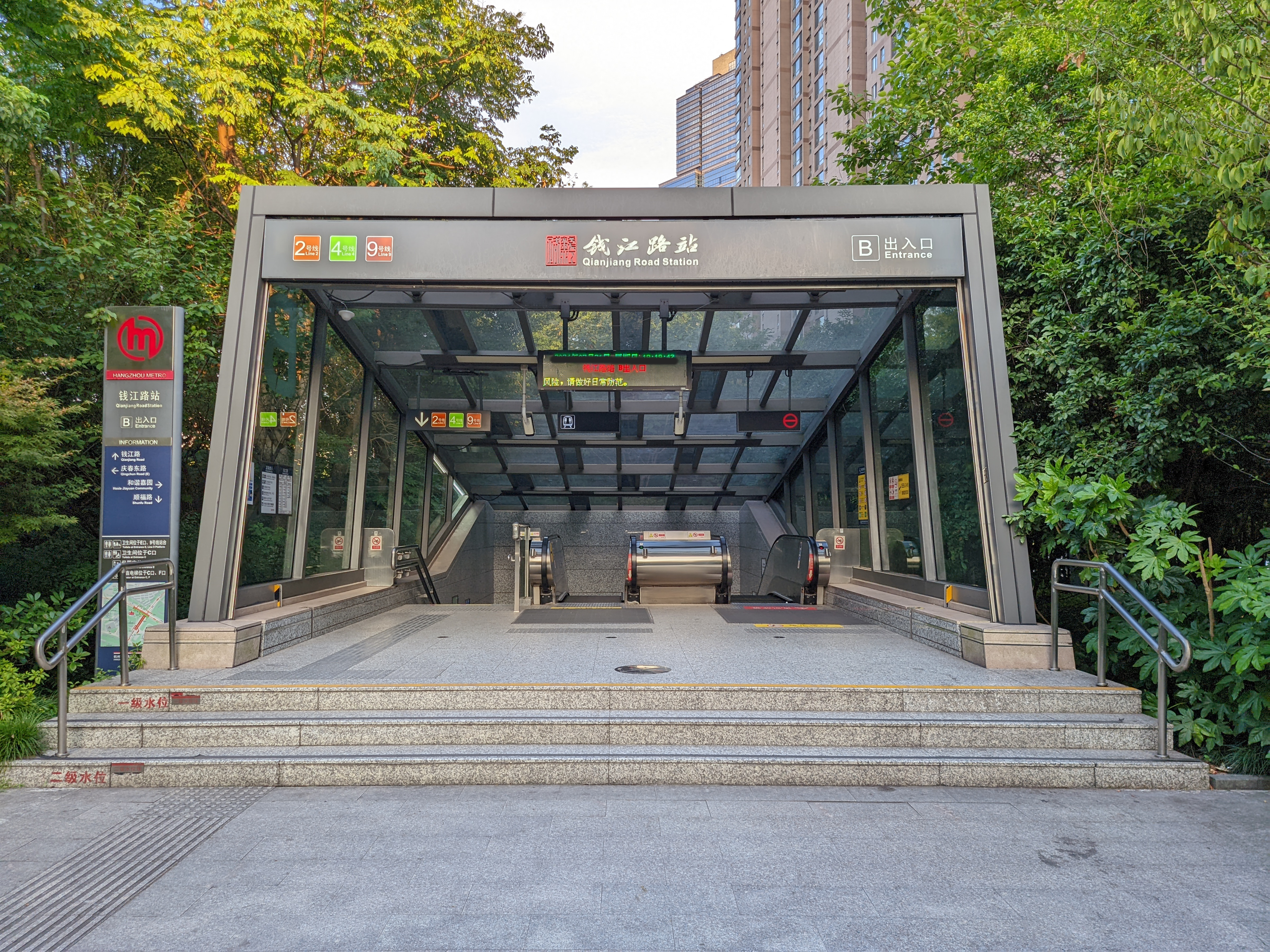
Exit B

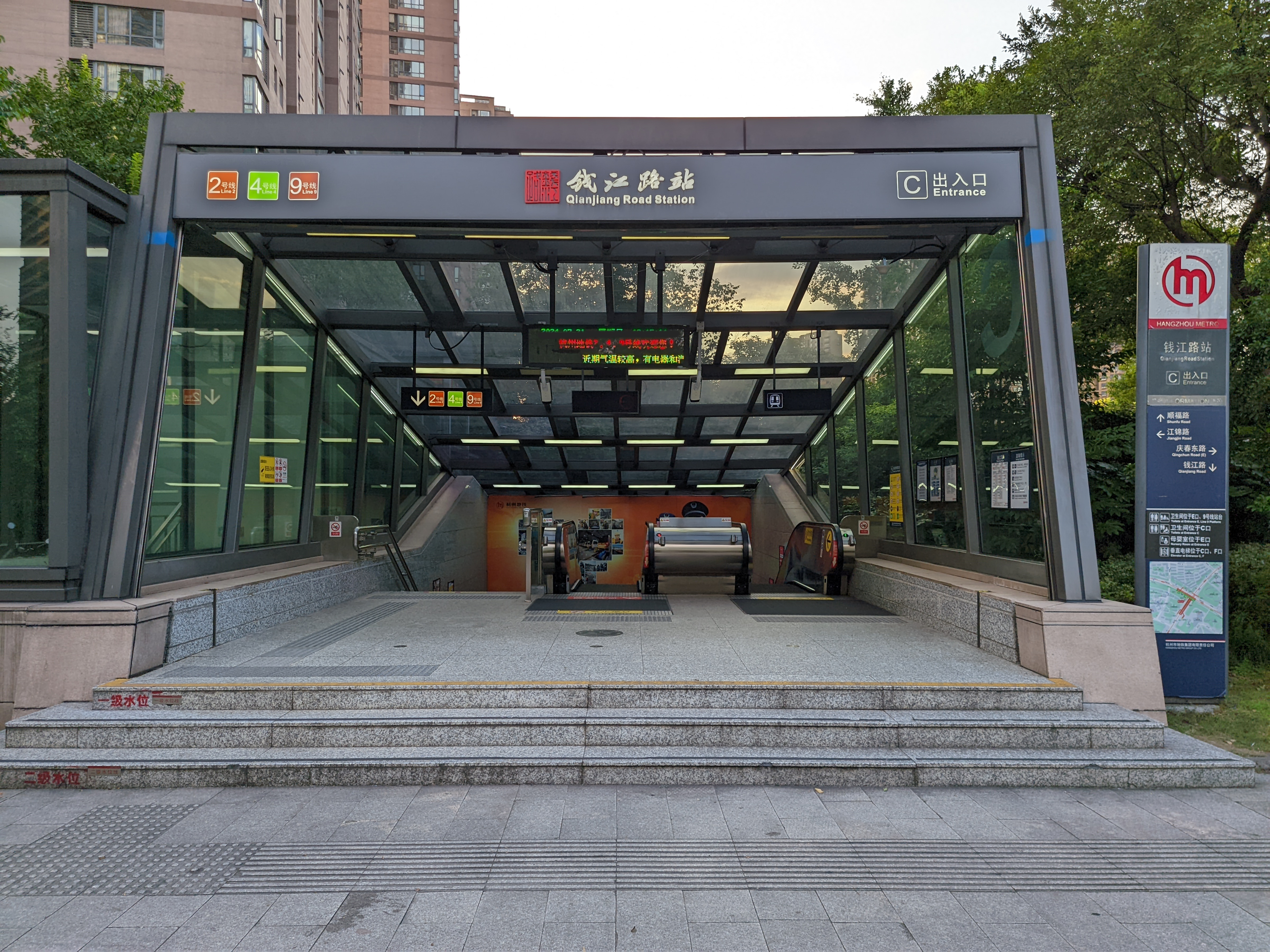
Exit C

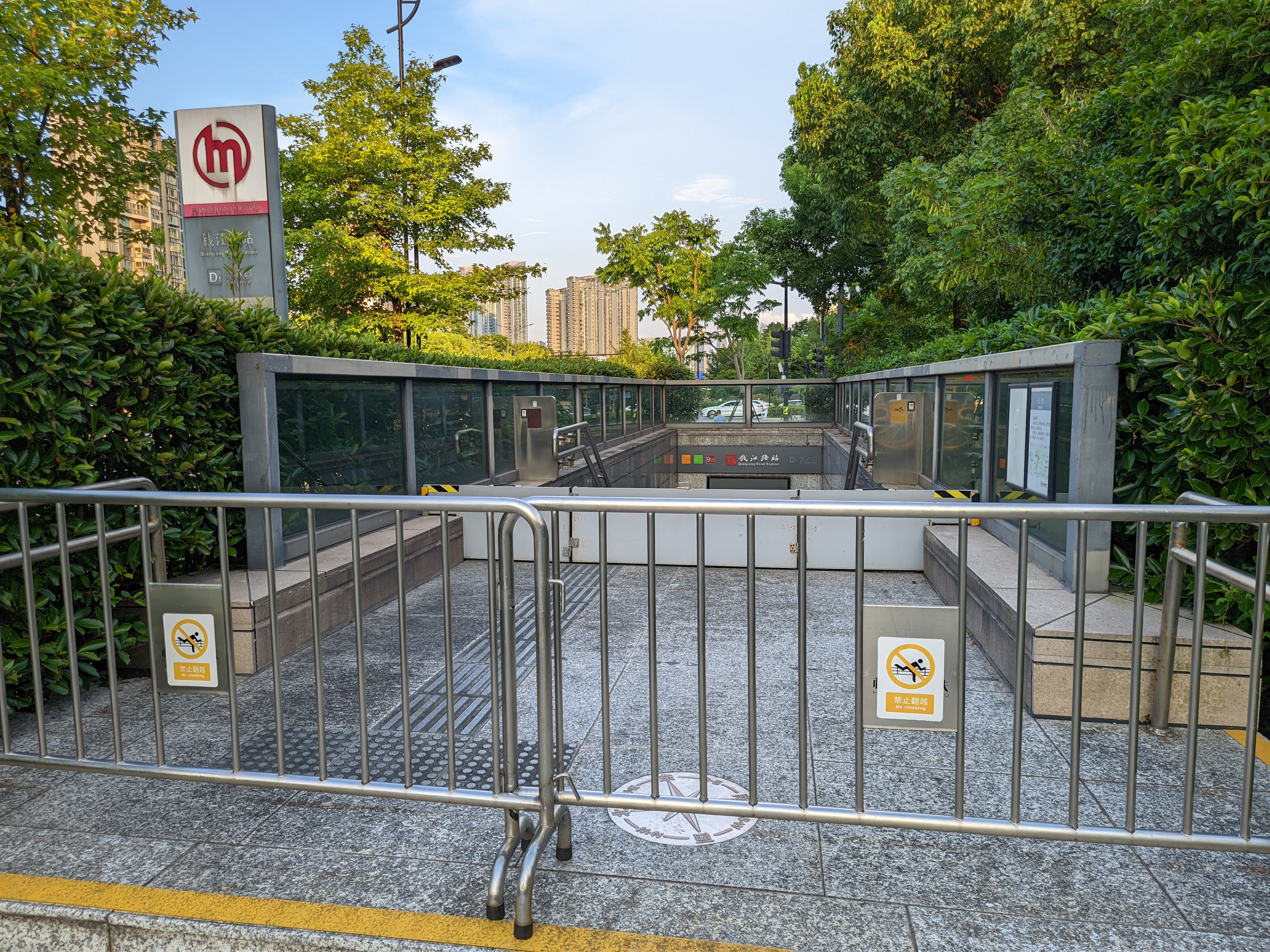
Exit D1

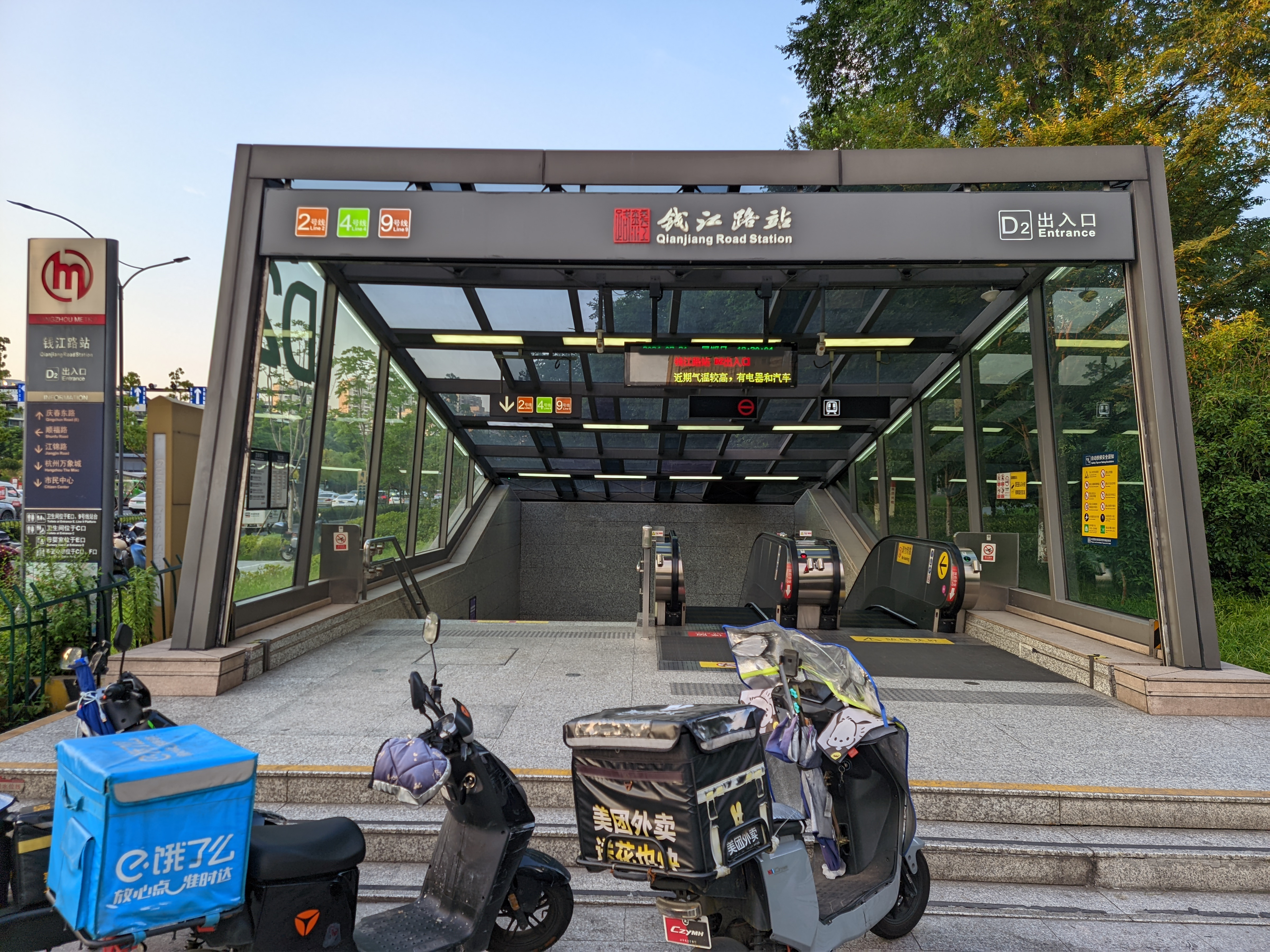
Exit D2

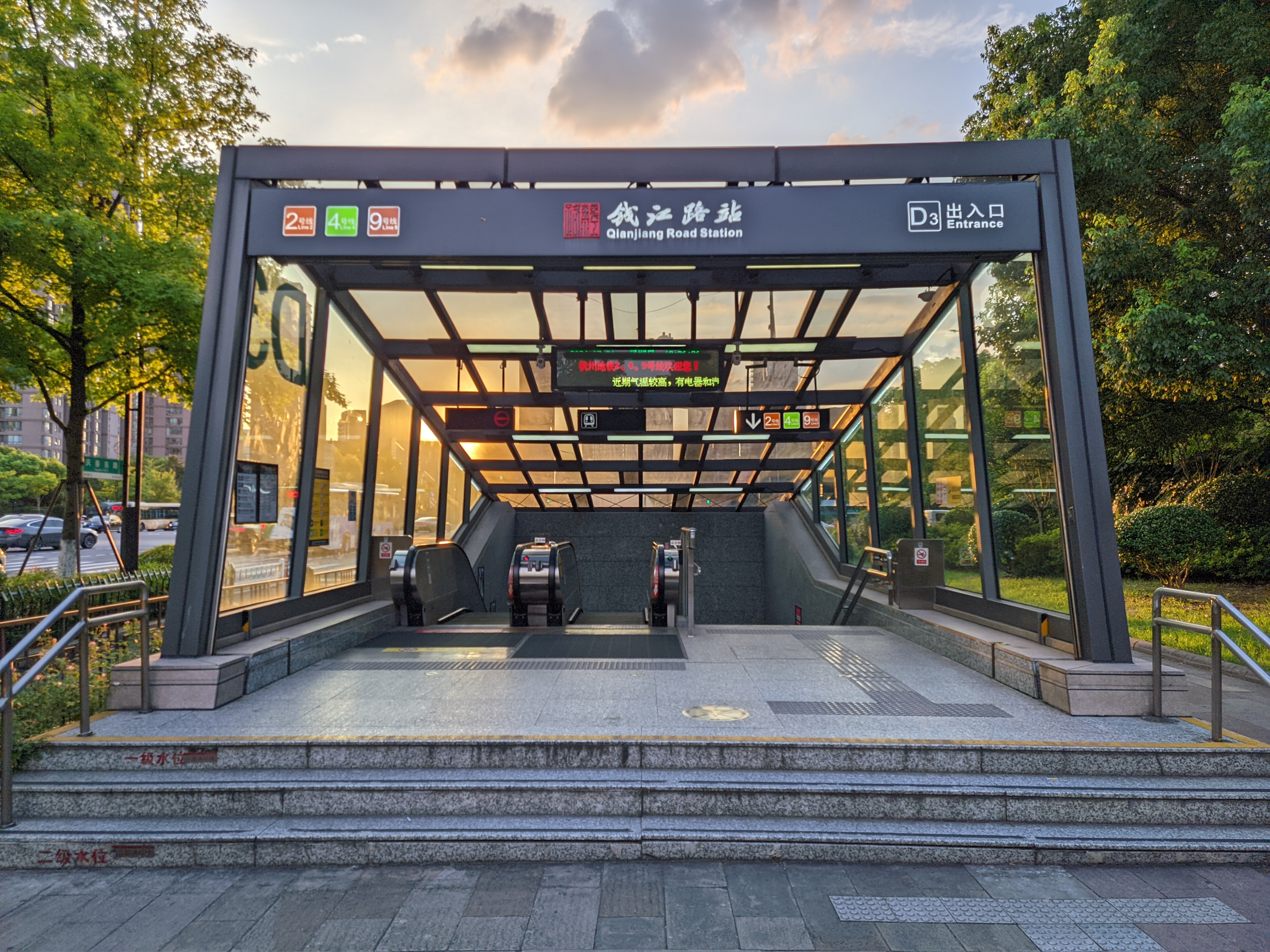
Exit D3

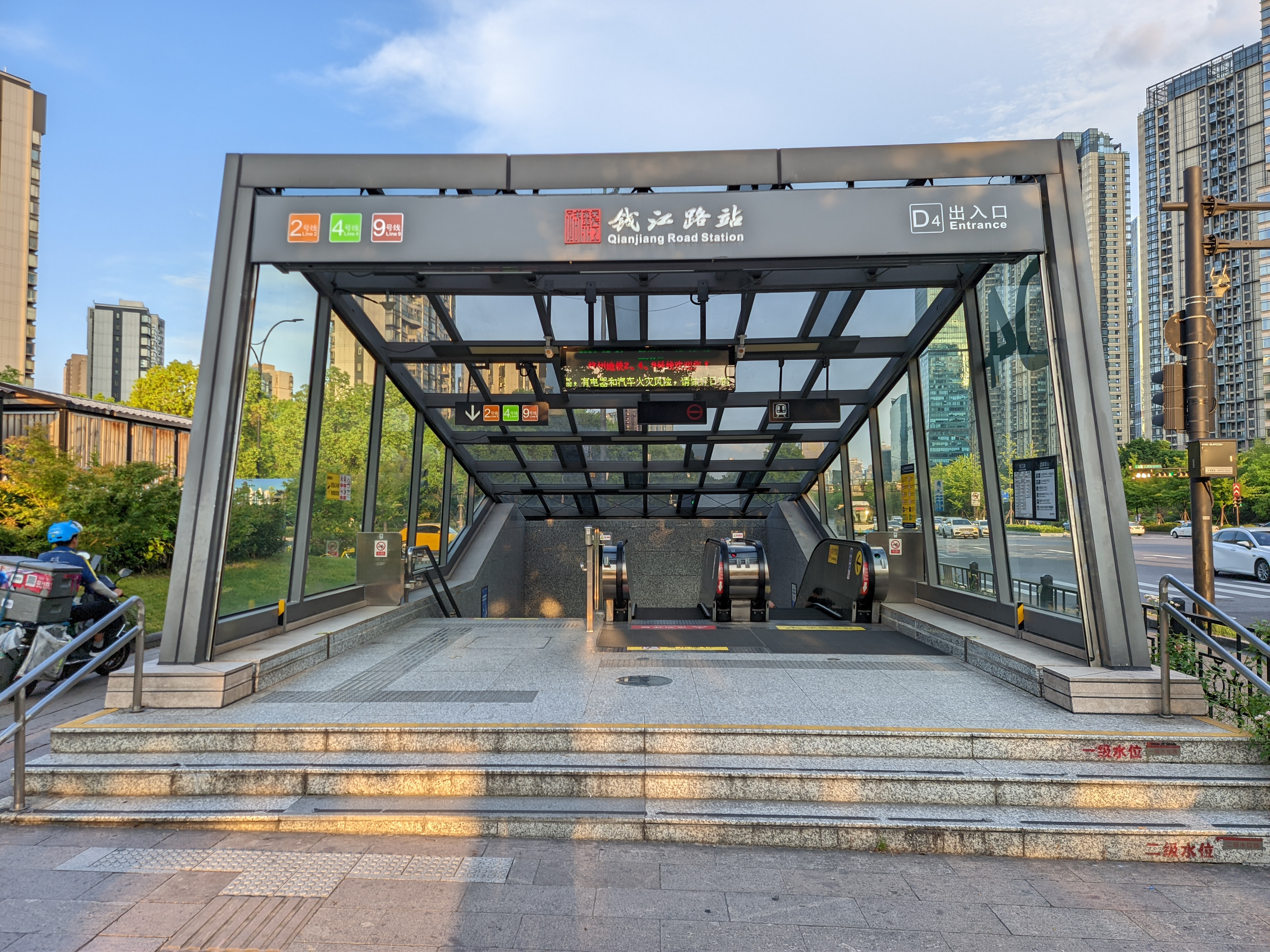
Exit D4

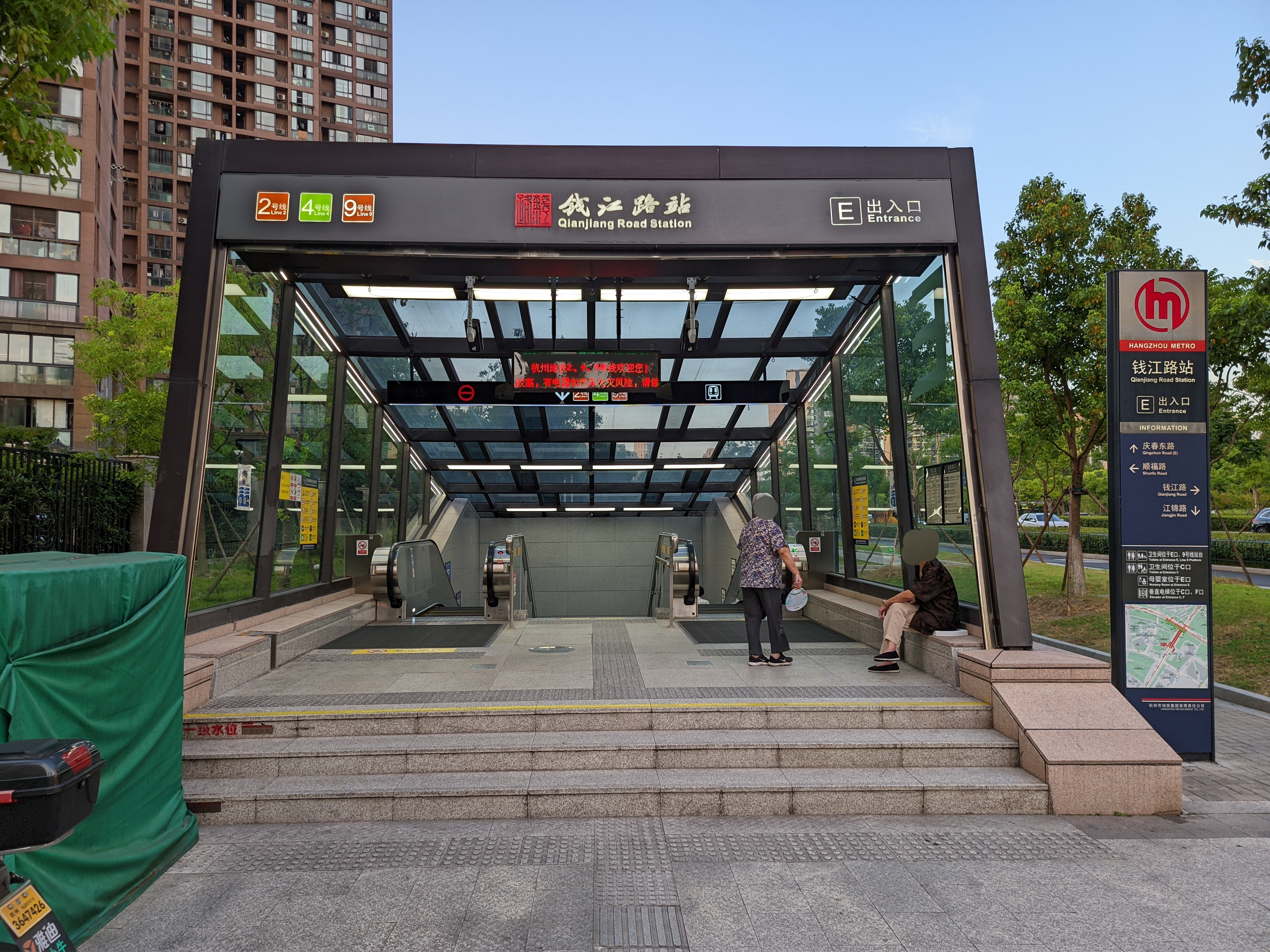
Exit E

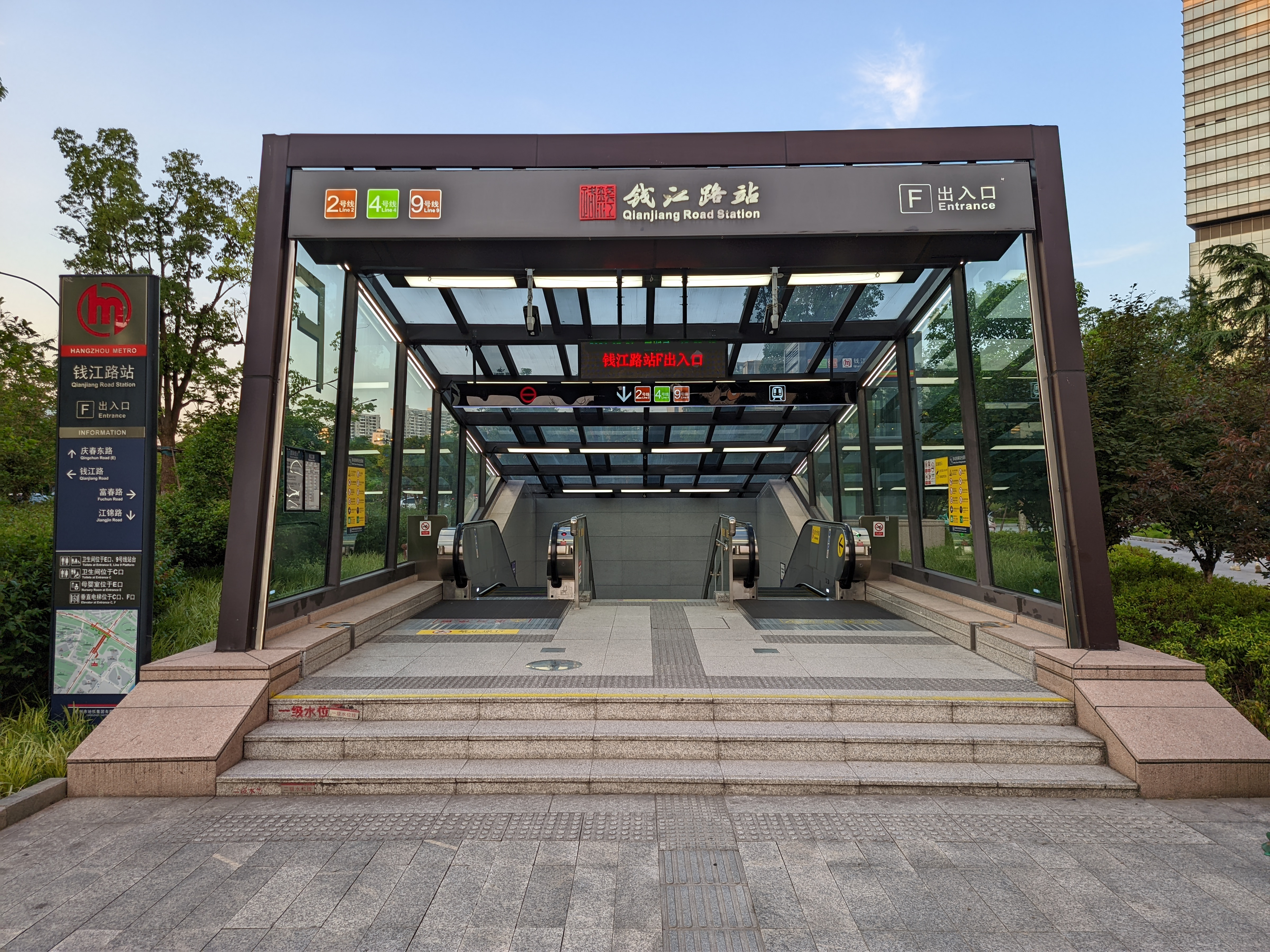
Exit F

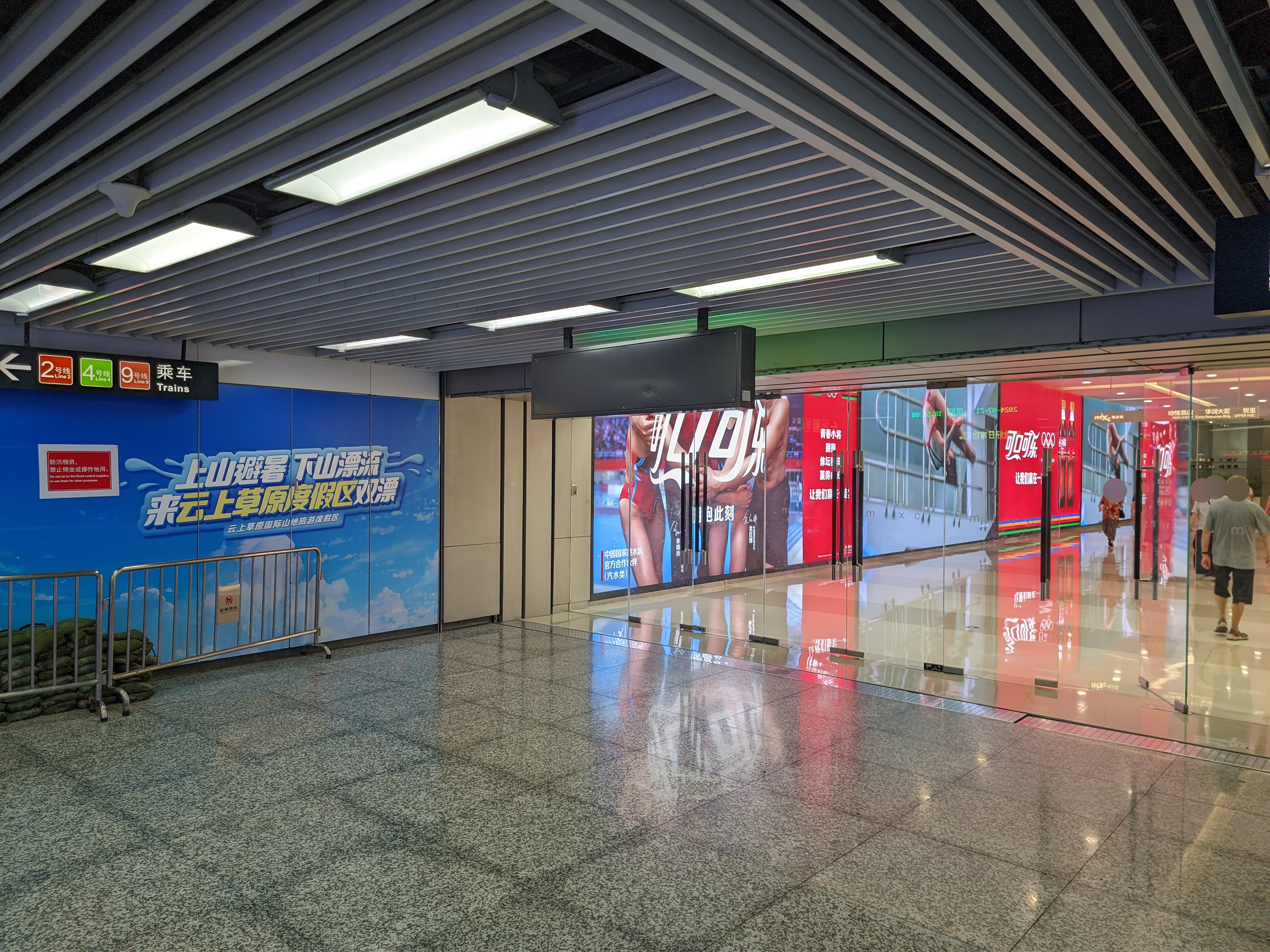
Subway To Hangzhou MixC

== Gallery ==
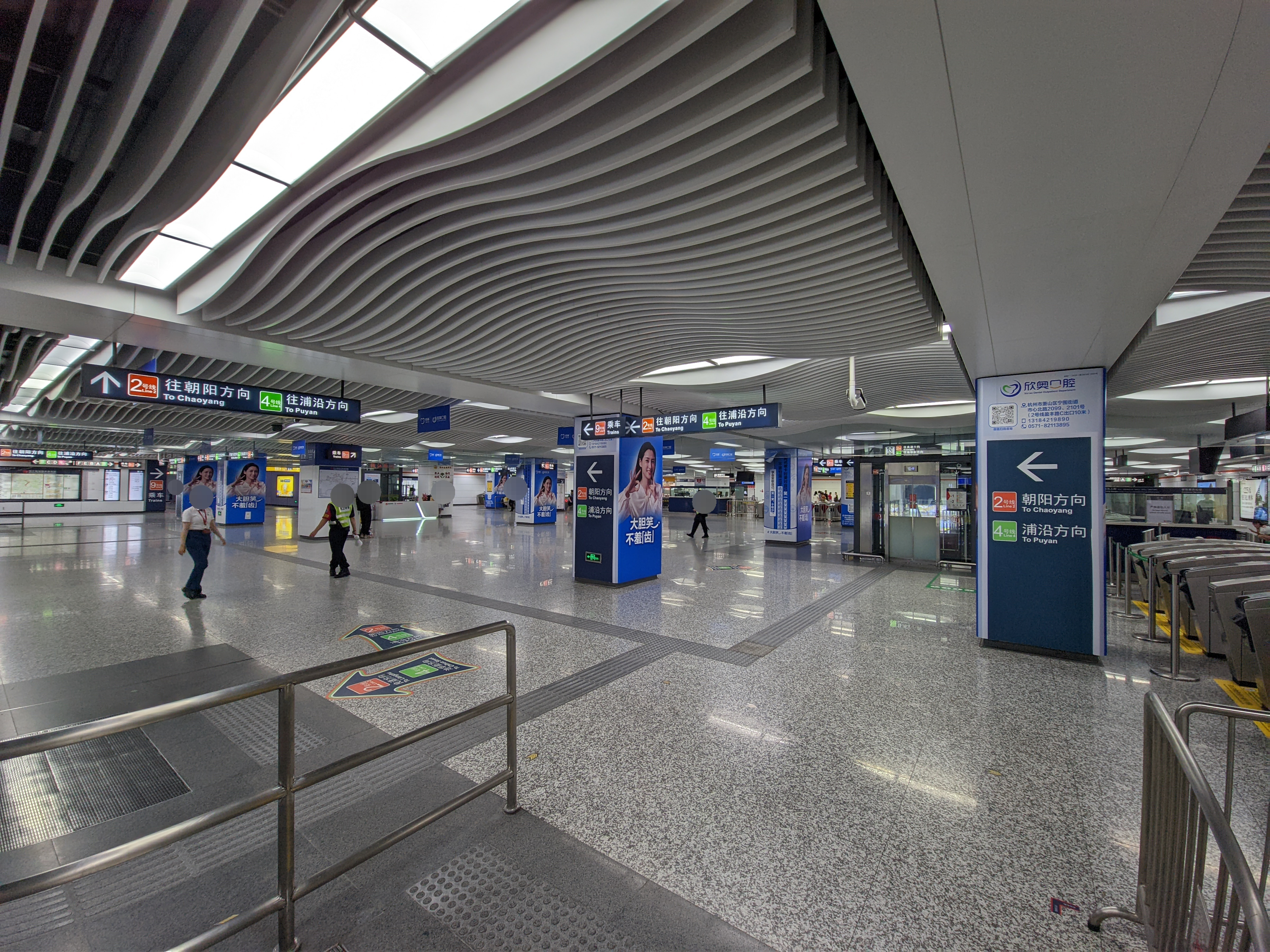
Concourse of Line 2 & 4

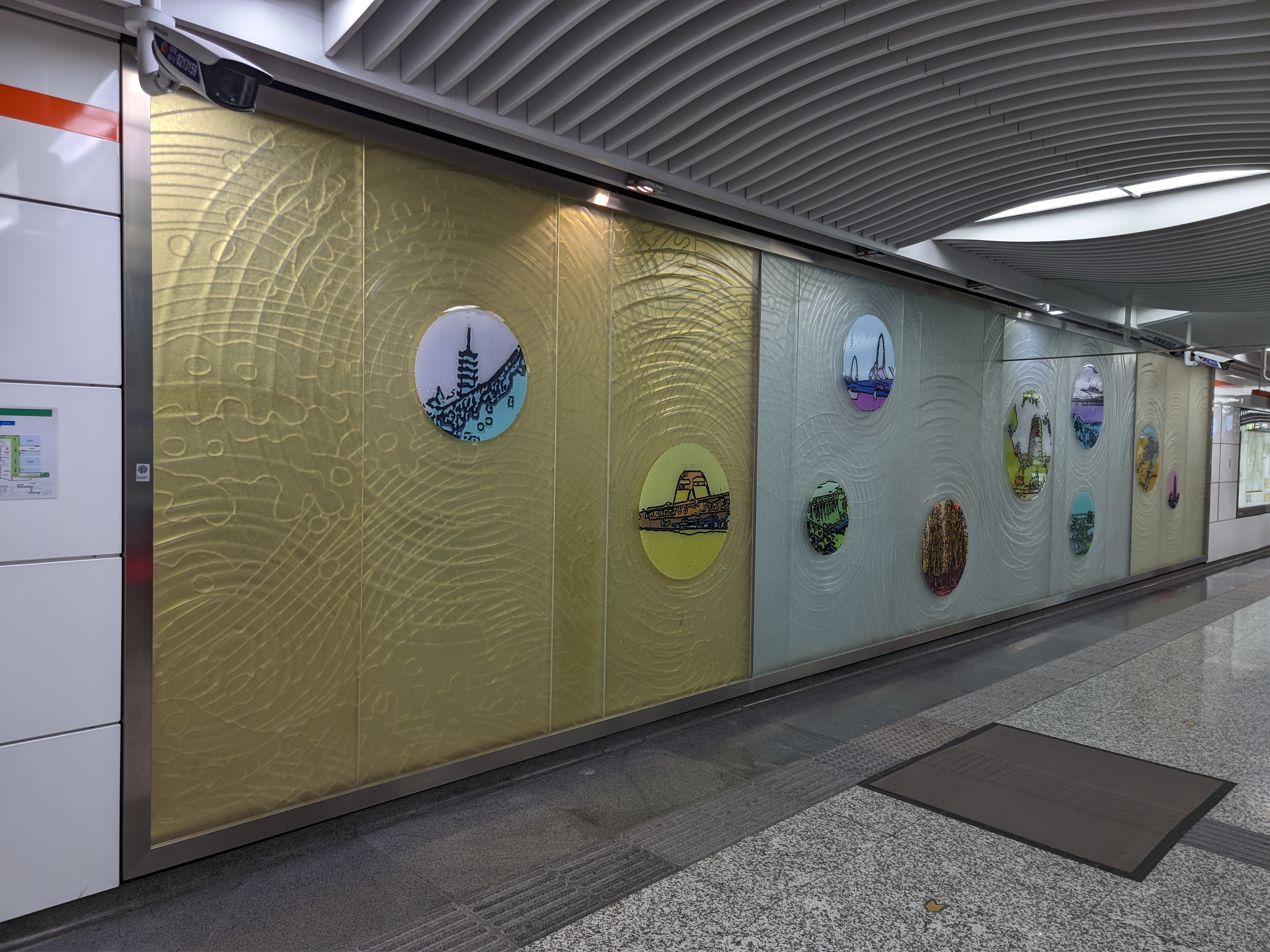
Art wall on Line 2 & 4 concourse

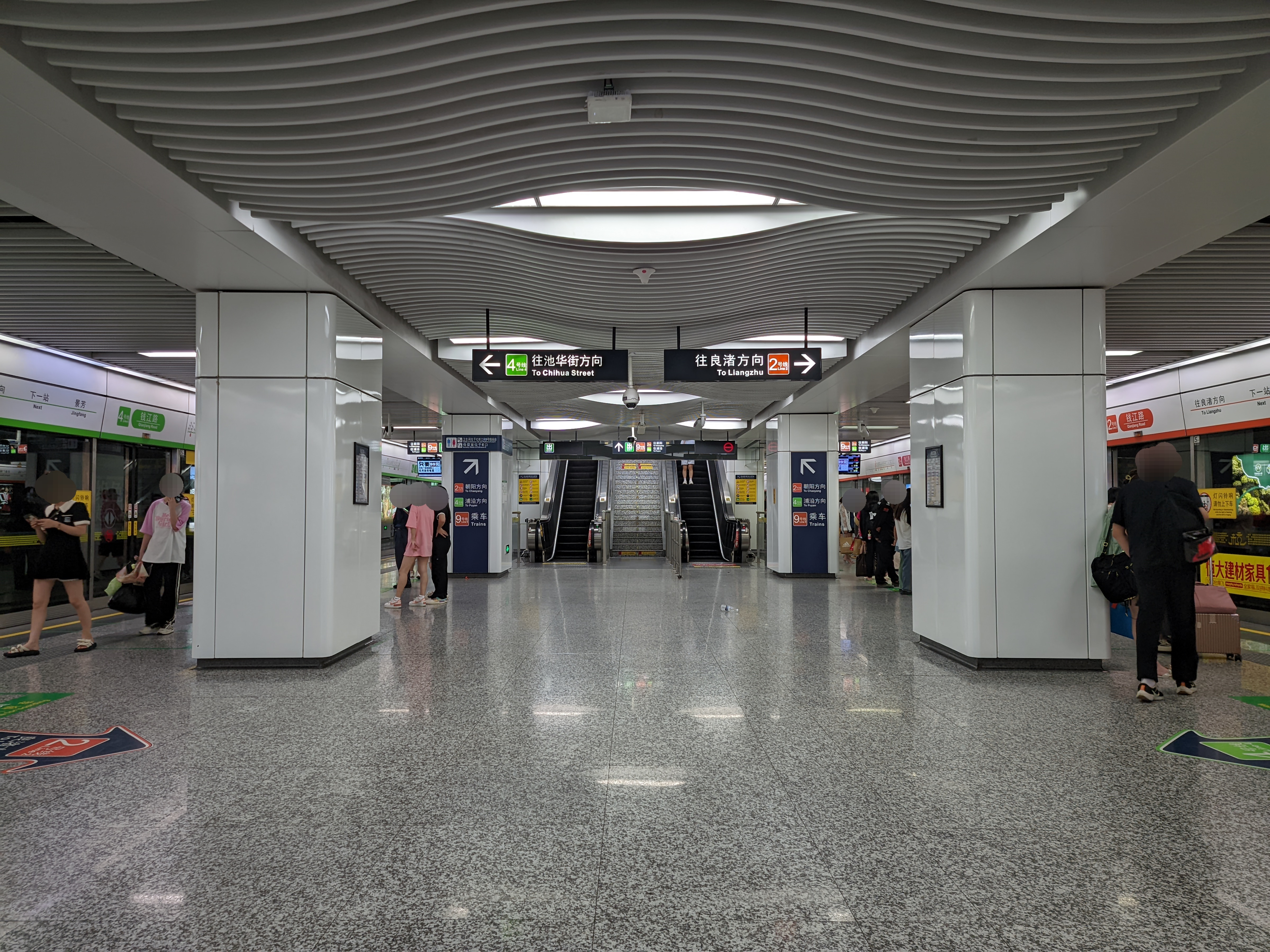
Platform for Line 2 towards Liangzhu and Line 4 towards Chihua Street

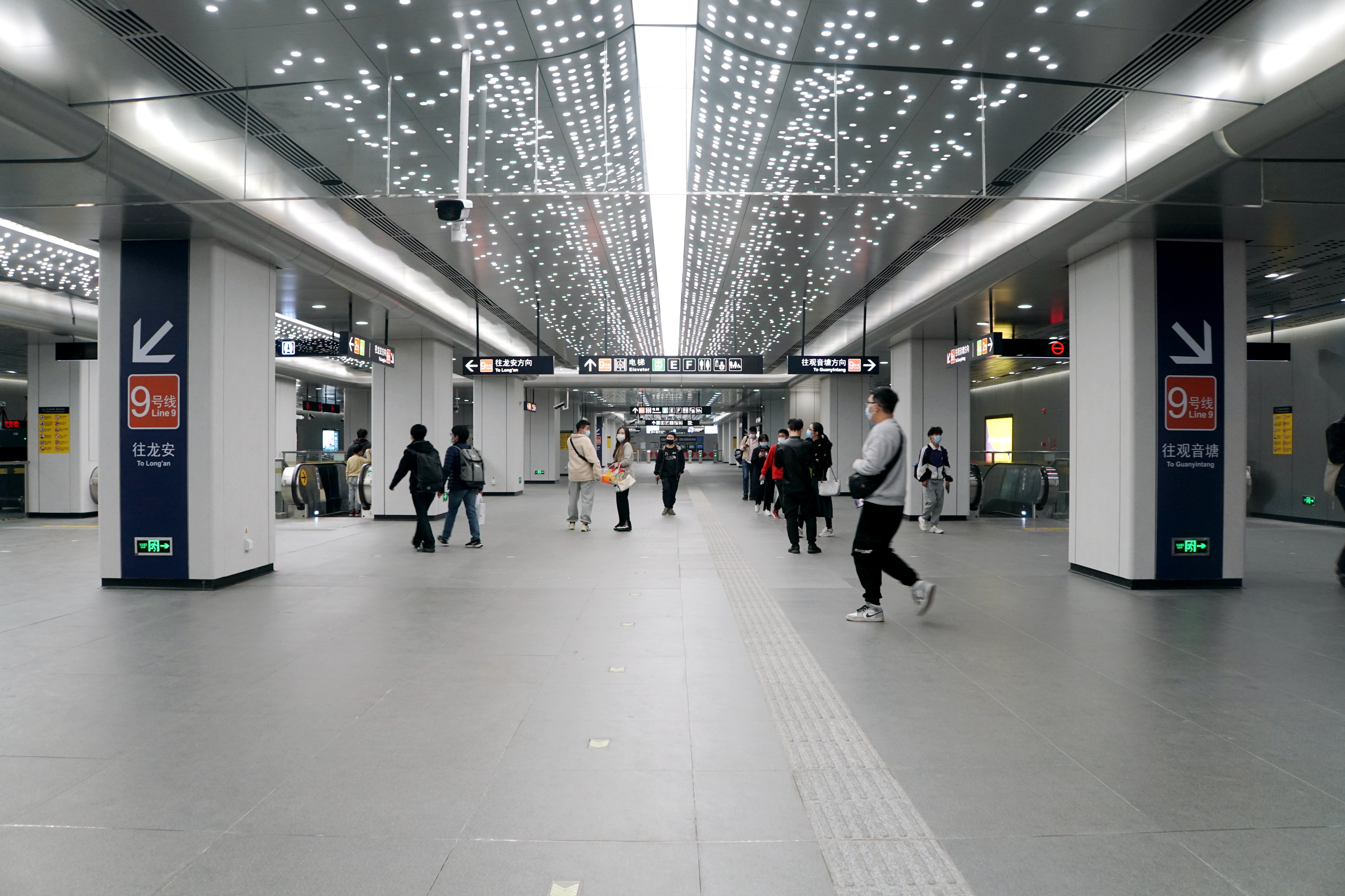
Concourse of Line 9

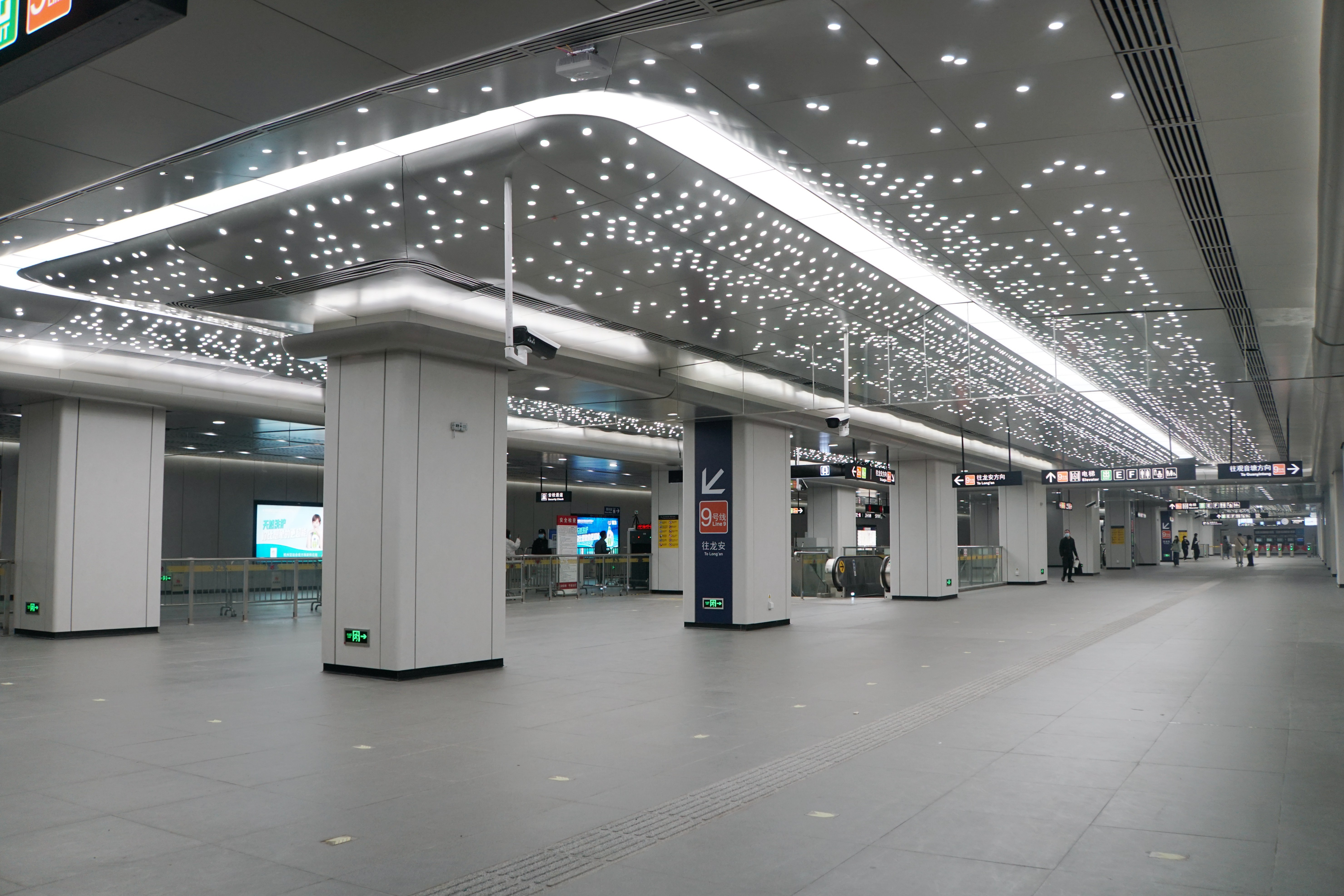
Concourse of Line 9

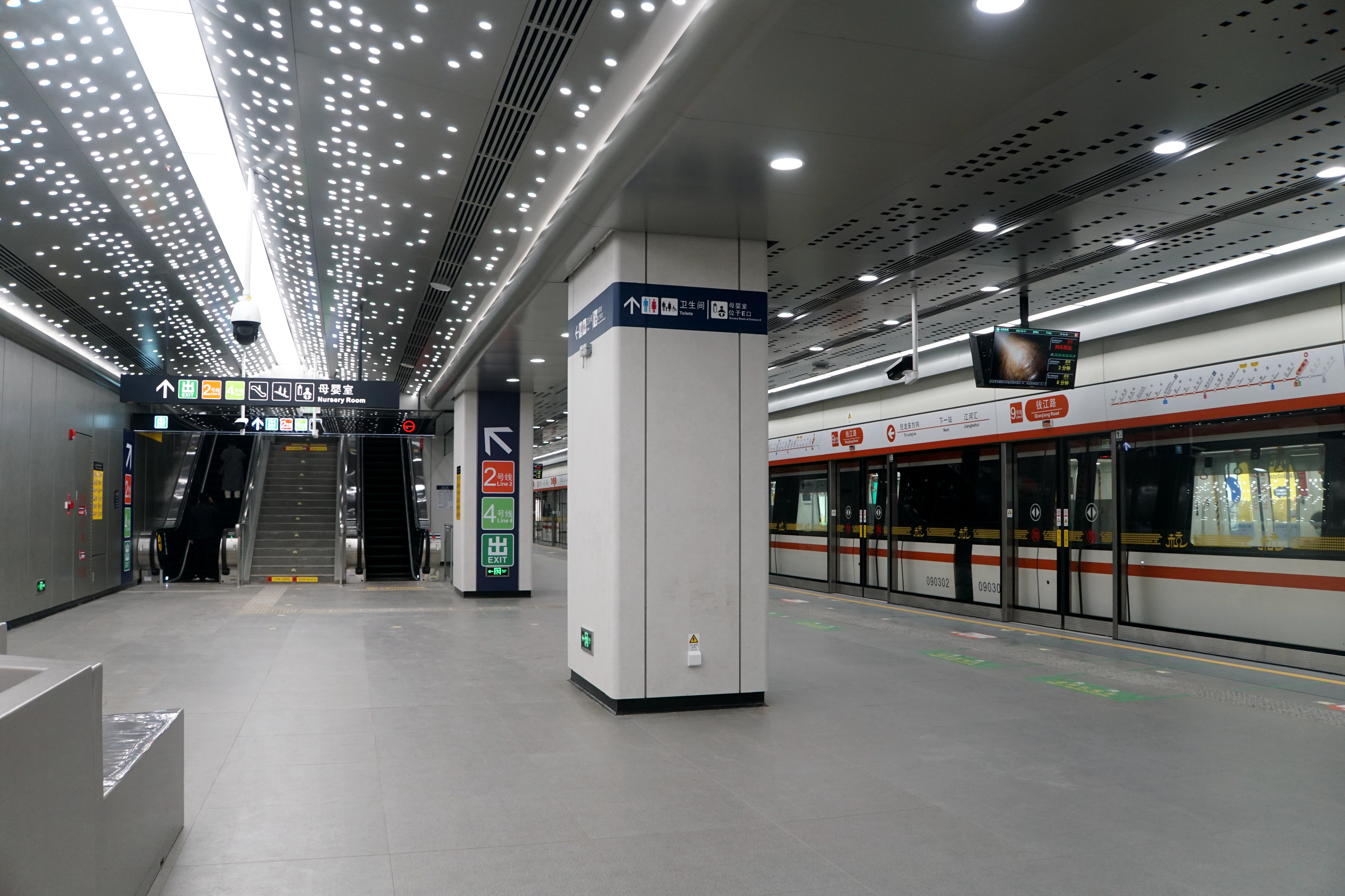
Platform towards Long'an

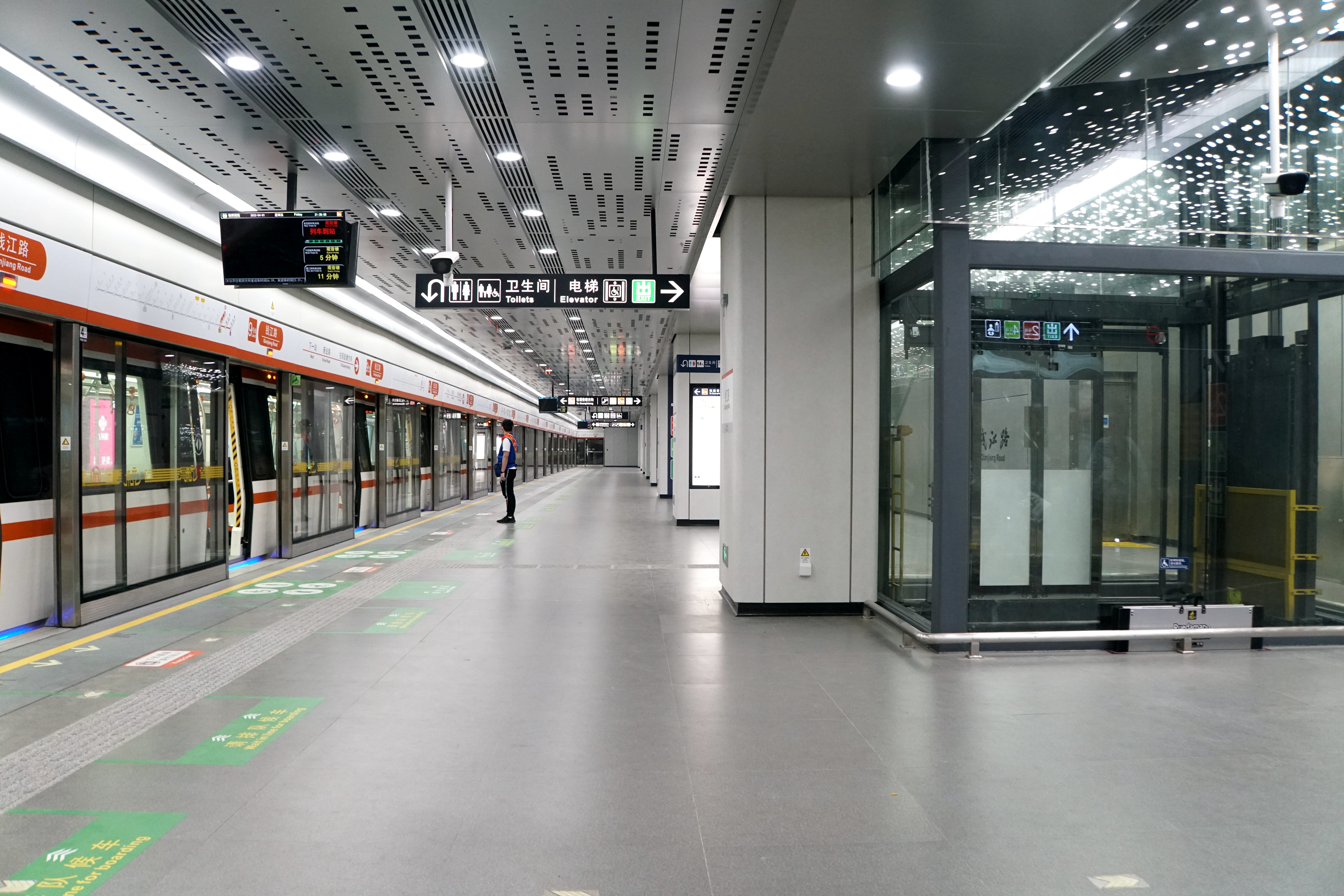
Platform towards Guanyintang

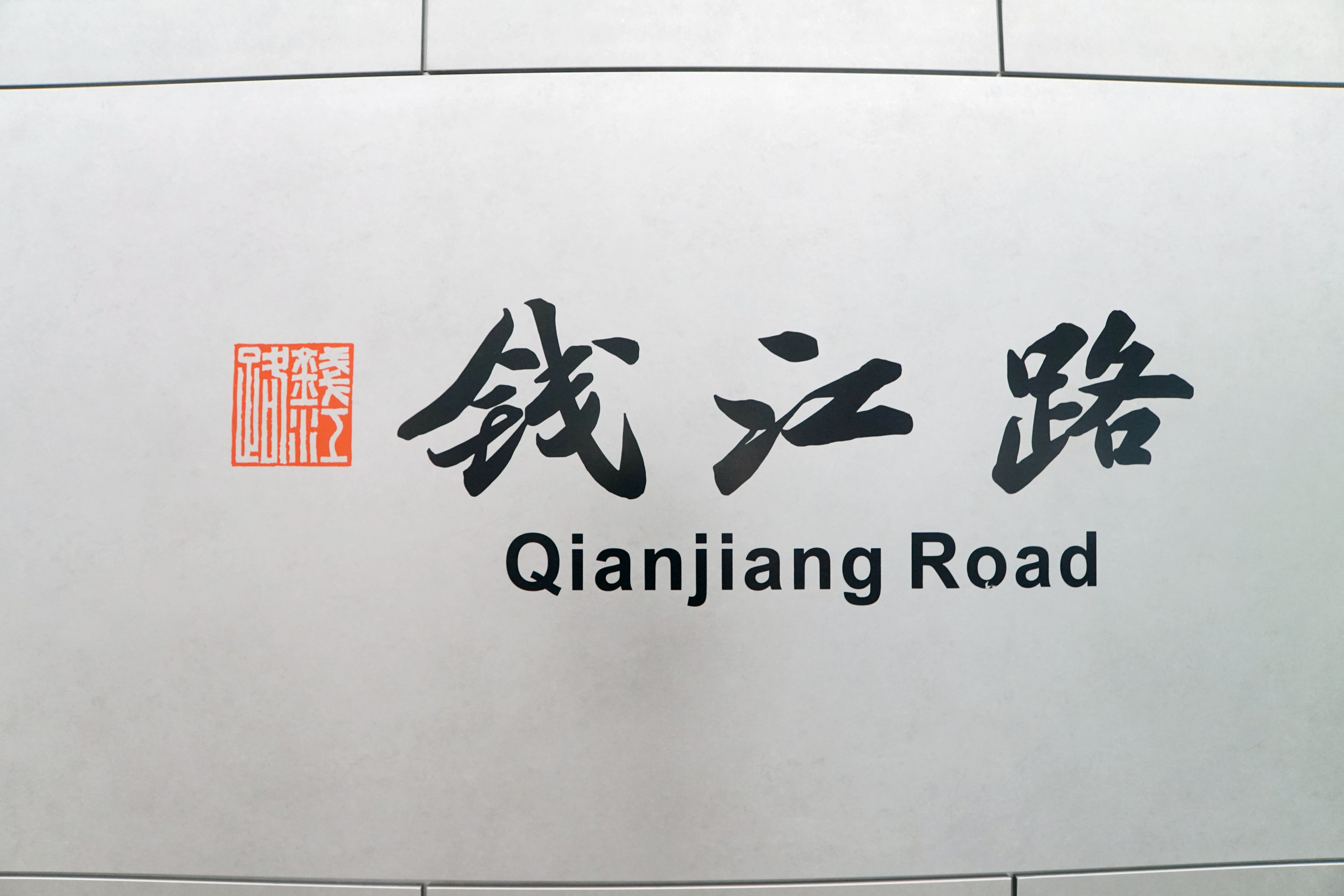
Name board on Line 9 platform

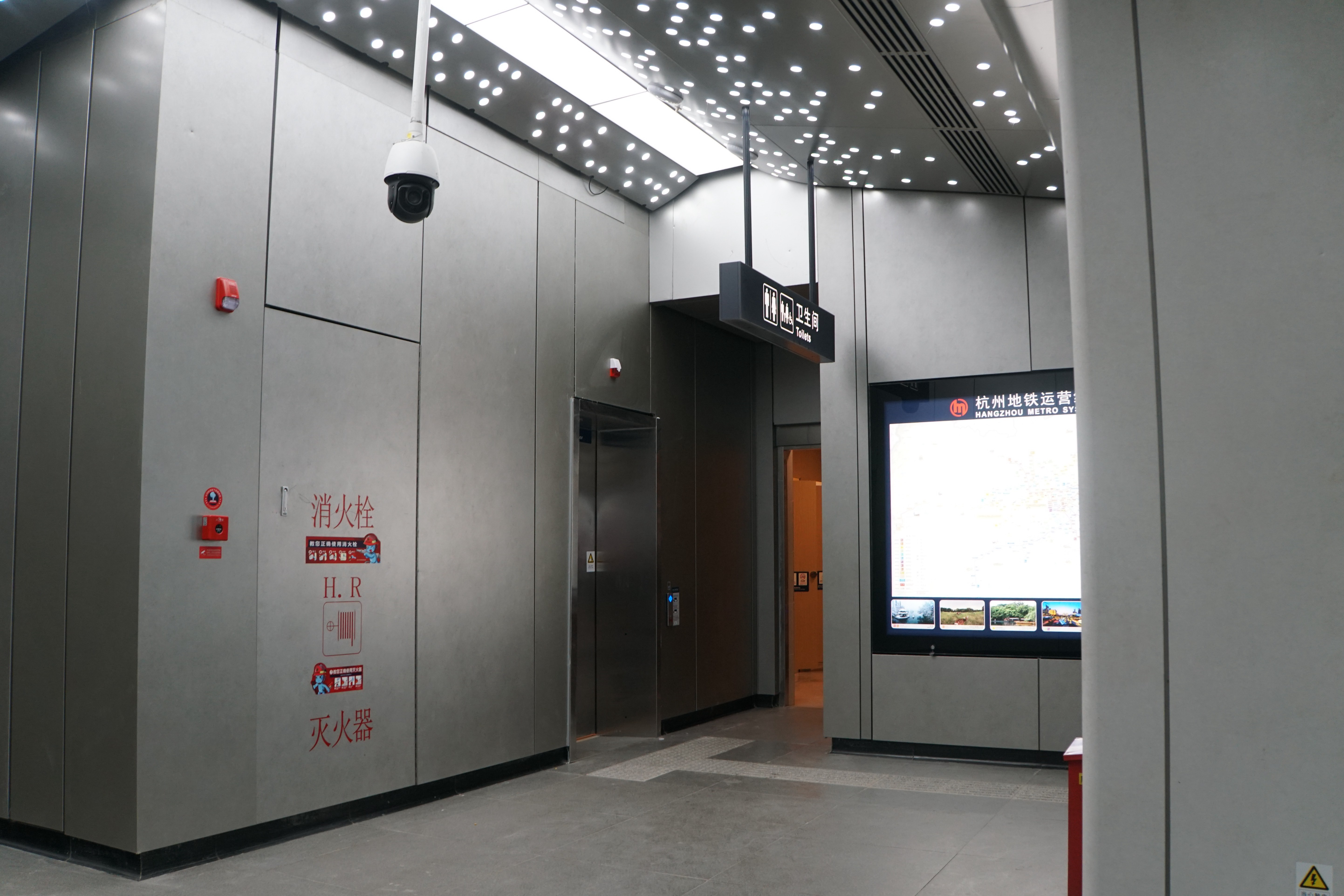
Line 9 platform has toilets

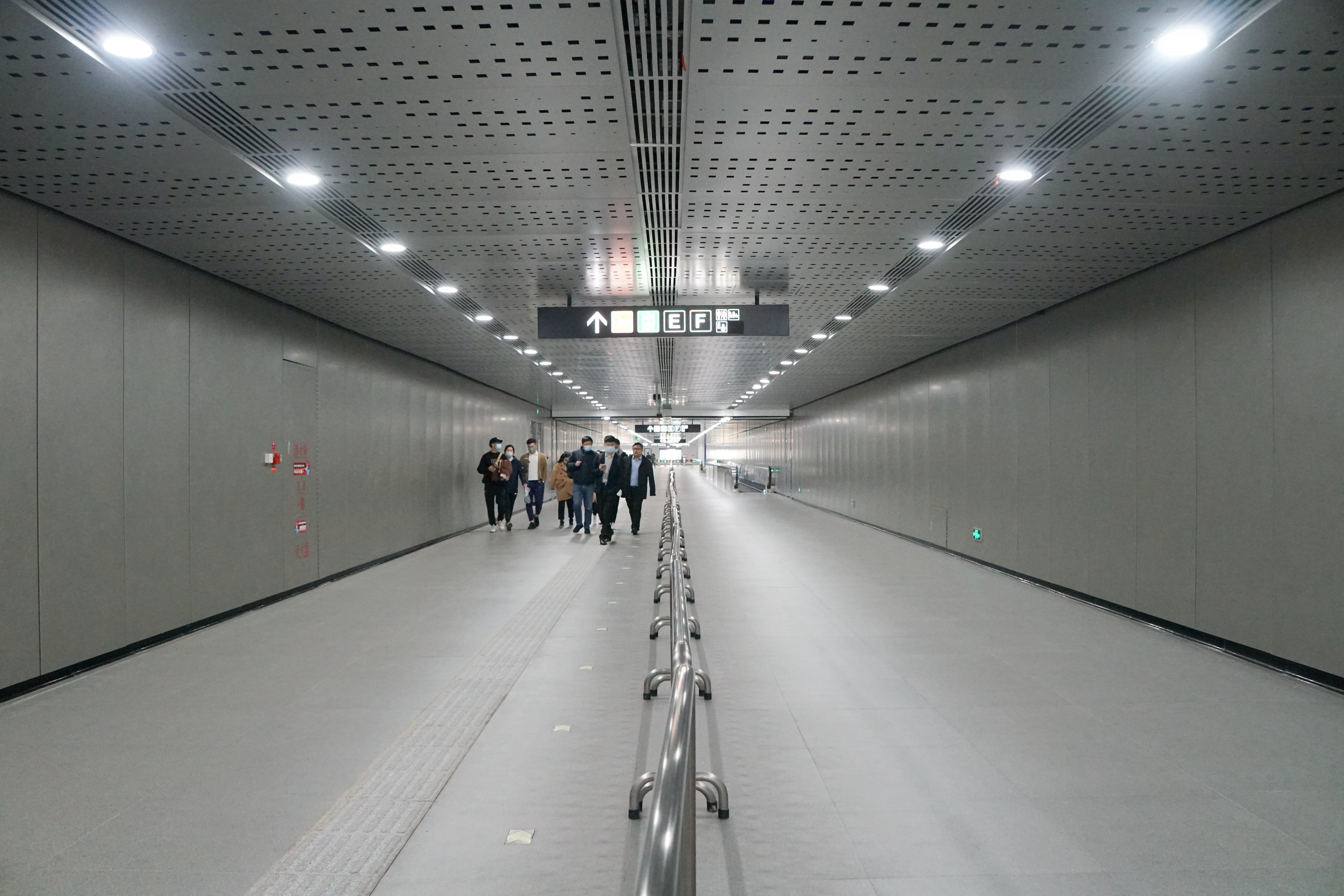
Transfer passage between Line 2/4 and Line 9

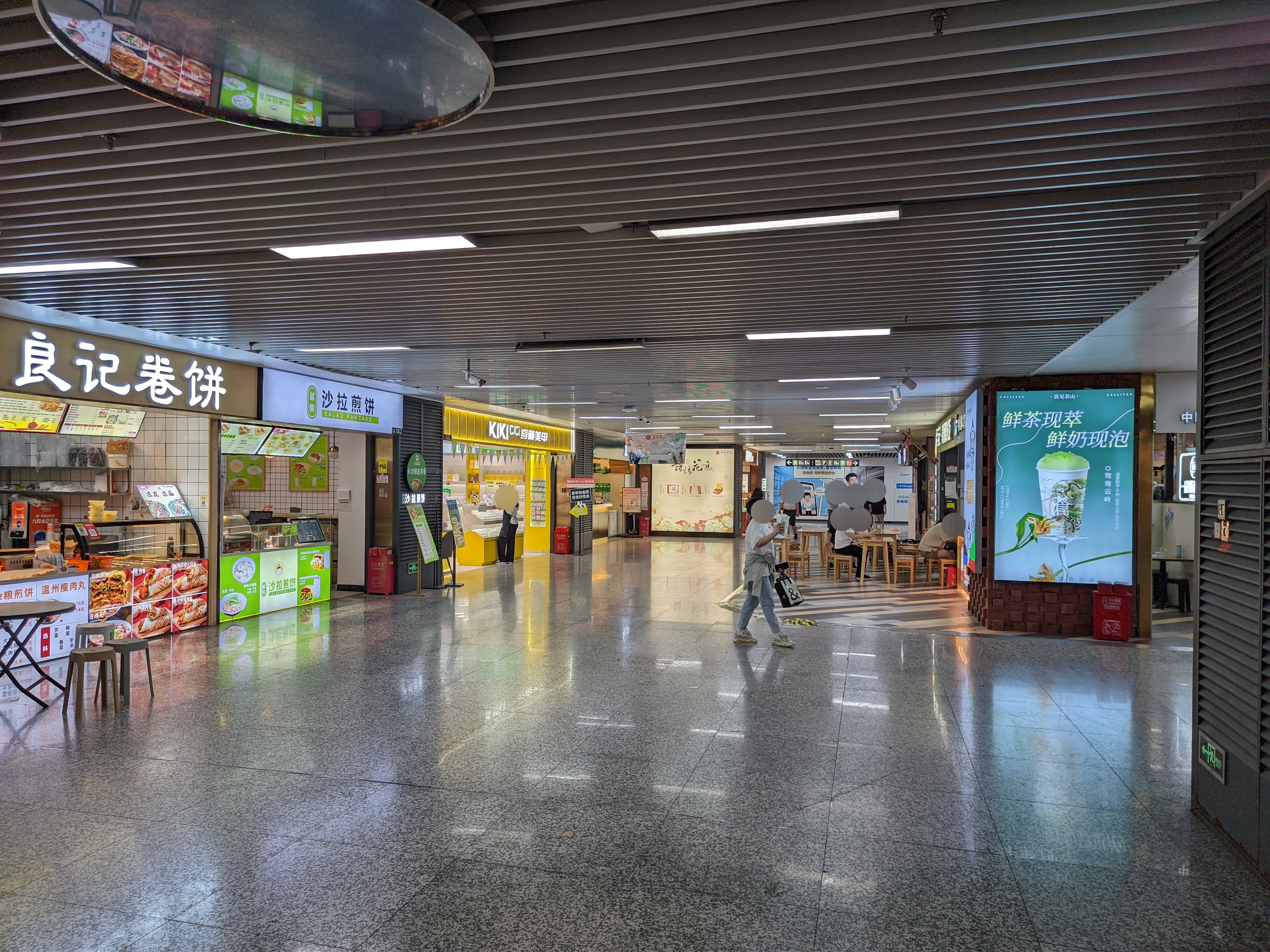
Metro Shops
