= Jingfang station =

Metro station in Hangzhou, China

Coordinates: 30°16′03″N 120°12′11″E

Jingfang 景芳
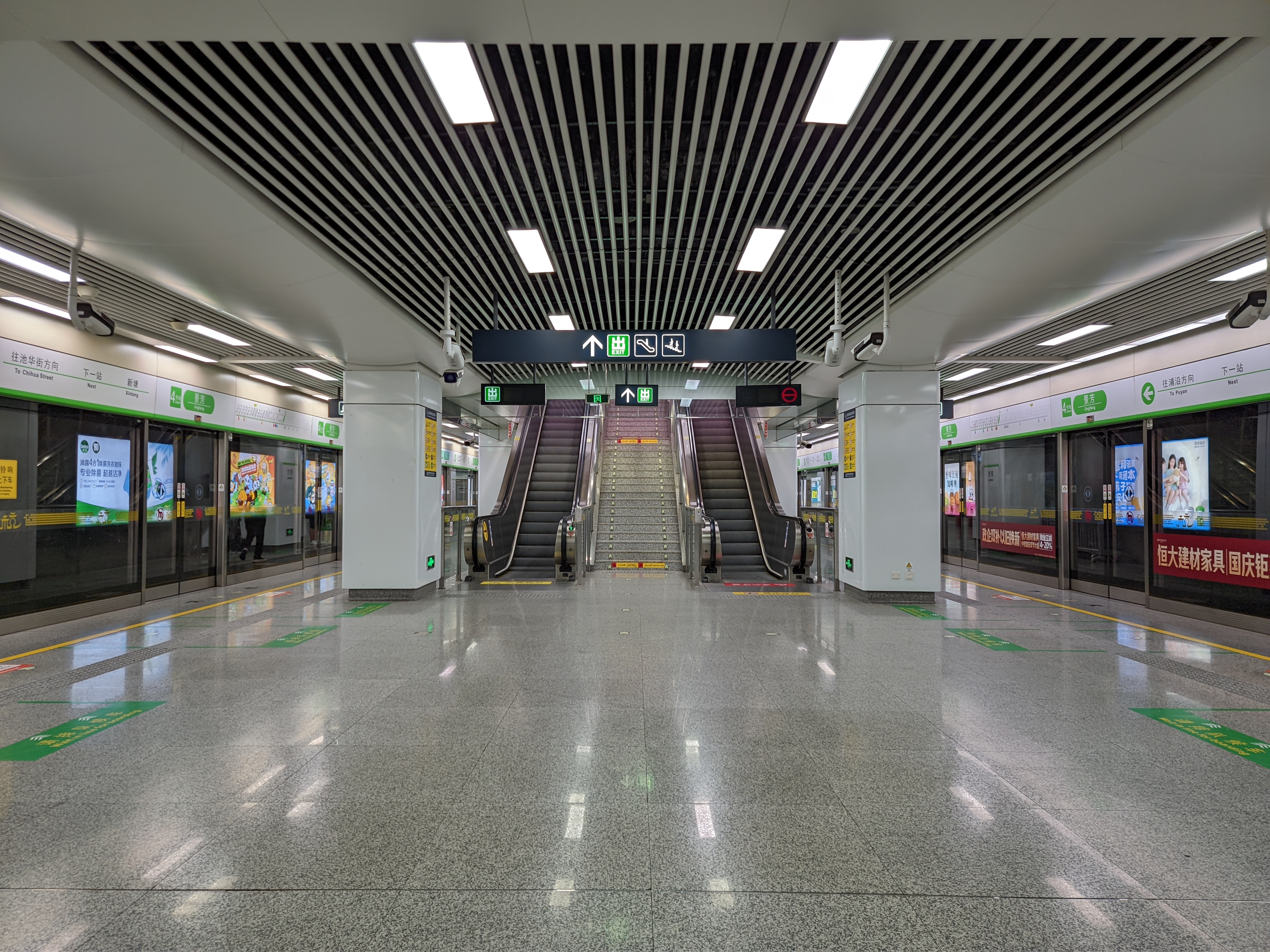
- Platform

General information
- Location: Shangcheng District, Hangzhou, Zhejiang; China
- Operated by: Hangzhou Metro Corporation
- Line(s): Line 4
- Platforms: 2 (1 island platform)

History
- Opened: February 2, 2015

Services
Preceding station	Hangzhou Metro	Following station
Qianjiang Road towards Puyan	Line 4	Xintang towards Chihua Street

Jingfang (Chinese: 景芳) is a metro station on Line 4 of the Hangzhou Metro in China. It is located in the Jianggan District of Hangzhou.
