= John William Miller (aviation) =

American aeronautical engineer

- Born: February 22, 1880; Dawson, Illinois
- Died: February 26, 1953 (aged 73); Seattle, Washington
- Education: University of Nebraska
- Occupations: Professor, engineer
- Known for: Aircraft innovation

John William Miller (February 22, 1880 – February 26, 1953) was an American aviation pioneer, civil engineer, and a professor of aeronautical engineering. He combined these skills to create new and different ways to conduct surveys, use and build aircraft, and teach those skills when aviation was in its infancy.

== Early life ==
John William Miller, nicknamed "Will", was born February 22, 1880, on a farm in Dawson, Illinois, third of four children. At age two the family moved, by covered wagon, near Adrian, Missouri and established a farm under a Civil War land grant.

In 1888 when crops were destroyed by a hail storm, Miller, age 8, was allowed to work as a water boy on a Kansas City Southern Railway grading gang, peaking his interest in rail travel. The family moved again in 1891 to homestead in Friend, Nebraska. On the farm Miller learned the mechanics of farm machinery leading to a job at age 15 solving mechanical problems for McCormick Harvesting Machine Company.

Miller, in 1895 at age 15, was following the efforts of aviation pioneers at the time through books and magazines available in the small town. One such person was Samuel Pierpont Langley, secretary of the Smithsonian Institution, who was experimenting with the development of an aircraft which he called an aerodrome. It was a steam powered unmanned glider launched with a catapult. In 1903 he made two unsuccessful attempts at manned flight. Miller was aware of Langley's efforts and wrote him to ask for instructions on building a glider. Langley responded with a full set of plans. He realized that Langley's plans were too complicated and costly to build. He was also studying the book Progress in Flying Machines by Octave Chanute. Using only the pictures in this book he proceeded to build and fly two gliders, making more than 200 flights before he was 19 years old.

Miller graduated from high school in 1900 and went on to the University of Nebraska Engineering College, majoring in civil engineering, graduating in 1905.

== Career ==
=== Railroad surveyor ===
After graduation, Miller immediately went to work for Burlington railroad. Following the Civil War the railroads began a period of rapid expansion, especially westward. Burlington, controlled by Charles Elliott Perkins, is an acquisition target of both Great Northern, controlled by James Hill and Union Pacific Railroad, controlled by E. H. Harriman.

Crucial to the expansion is finding a route suitable to a train at a reasonable cost to build, especially through the Rocky mountains. Miller lead a survey team to scout such a route west. The work of the survey teams was to identify and map a right of way along the route, then file a right of way claim. It was not unusual for the competing survey crews to spy on each other and claim the right of way surveyed ahead of the other team. Miller learned that a route his team was working on had been so claimed.

=== First powered flight ===
Miller decided he had to find a better way to conduct the right-of-way surveys. He had an old three wheeled biplane he had been using for glider experiments on which he rigged with a 20 hp engine. After a few trial flights, he was satisfied it would fly and he could control it. He strapped a camera to the framework and successfully make aerial photographs of the rail route. He claimed this to be the first powered flight west of the Mississippi and first use of powered fixed-wing aerial photography.

=== University of Washington ===
On September 1, 1909, Miller married Florence Lovetinsky in Rapid City South Dakota. His application to teach Civil Engineering at the University of Washington was accepted for the Fall of 1909, and he and Florence moved to Seattle. In 1913, 1915, 1917 his first three children were born: Mercedes, Vivian and Charles. A fourth daughter, Josephine, was born in 1923.

About the same time William Boeing had a keen interest in aviation and started a company together with George Conrad Westervelt to produce his own airplanes. Their first design was the B&W (Boeing & Westervelt). Boeing realized that for his airplane company to be successful, he would need a source of trained aeronautical engineers. He approached the University of Washington engineering department with an offer. He would build a wind tunnel for the university if they would start a school of aeronautical engineering.

At this time Miller was instructing civil engineering and was involved in several civil engineering projects around Seattle, including building the ship canal connecting Lake Washington to Puget Sound through the Ship Canal and Ballard locks, and surveying the Camp Lewis cantonment site. When the wind tunnel project proposed by Boeing began, Miller was responsible for design and construction. For their participation in the program the University offered an airplane structures class, taught by Miller, for the spring of 1917. Miller's involvement in working with Boeing on the wind tunnel lead to Boeing offering him the position of chief engineer at the newly renamed Boeing Airplane Company. Consequently, the airplane structures class was canceled, until a new instructor could be found. Thus Frank McKone was hired for the 1917-1918 academic year, Frank taught the class for just one year by which time WW1 had ended, Boeing was out of work and so Miller left to return to the University to teach the aeronautics class.

Miller initially worked as an assistant professor with the expectation he would be promoted to associate professor. This promise was never fulfilled and Miller left in October 1919 after only two quarters, to accept a position as chief engineer for the American Aircraft Corporation.

Next he became president and general manager of Western Automotive Co., later changed the name to J.W. Miller Aircraft Corp which he moved to Green Lake. In 1929 the University began discussions with Harry Guggenheim and the Guggenheim fund for the advancement of aeronautics. This led to a grant of $290,000 to build a new building to house the new school of aeronautics. Miller, who had been serving as secretary of the Guggenheim Fund Board of Trustees, had returned to the University. For the first time the aeronautics faculty consisted of more than one instructor.

=== Boeing ===
When Boeing Airplane Company was formed in 1917, the chief engineer position was filled by Boeing's partner, George Conrad Westervelt. He was replaced by James Foley, who was with the company two years, Foley was replaced by Wong Tsu, who left after a little over a year to return to China. A plaque at the museum of flight recognizes Wong Tsu as the first Boeing chief engineer On the departure of Tsu, Miller was offered the position of chief engineer by William Boeing, because "he came with more practical aviation experience than all his predecessors combined". He accepted and was instrumental in organizing the engineering, inspection and production departments. Under his supervision the plant built five Boeing Model C aircraft per week for a Navy rush order. At the end of the war, a memo was issued announcing that the position of Chief Engineer was abolished, this was later rescinded. In the first 30 months of business Boeing had had four chief engineers. Miller returned to the University of Washington.

=== Civic promoter of aviation ===
Realizing that airplanes would need airports, In a speech before the Transportation Club in 1918 Miller advocated a search for an appropriate site. Out of that meeting, the committee would purchase the Sand Point, Seattle site. Miller served as a member of the Mayor's Air Board in charge of the work.

=== Private enterprise ===
Miller returned to the University in January 1919 but resigned in October that year to accept a position as chief engineer for the American Aircraft Corporation of Port Angeles (no information of this company has been found). The following year he became president and general manager of the Western Automotive Services Company at 2330 Third Ave., Seattle. The company's name later was changed to the J. W. Miller Corporation and the operations were moved to the Green Lake area.

During the five years from 1920 to 1925 Miller and his associates built or rebuilt fifty-two planes. In addition, they designed and built gliders, propellers, pontoons, and other aircraft parts and conducted a ground school for flying students. Another "first" in his career came during this period when, in 1920, he designed and built the first commercial enclosed cabin plane, equipped with brakes. "Flyers thought it was a crazy idea," Miller said, "to put brakes on the wheels. You weren't going to catch them nosing a plane over by slamming on the brakes. But the idea proved sound, as everyone knows today."

In the same year he also built a practical monoplane with folding wings and with power applied to the wheels so it could maneuver on the ground as an automobile. Miller drove it on roads for more than 100 miles at speeds from 5 to 25 miles an hour.

=== World War II ===
In 1942, Miller applied for and was offered a position with Vega Aircraft Corporation, a part of Lockheed, in Burbank California. This engagement lasted through the end of the war.

== Publications ==
- "An Explanation of Soaring Flight". Aviation. Vol. 13, no. 5. July 31, 1922. pp. 121–123.
- "A Flying Somnabulist". Overland Monthly. Vol. 80, no. 3. September 1922. p. 25.
- Air Transportation and its Influence on Our Social and Economic Structure (Thesis). University of Nebraska. 1928.
