= Wang Zhu =

Wang Zhu is the name of:

- Wong Tsu or Wang Zhu (1893–1965), Chinese aircraft designer
- Wang Zhu (motorcyclist) (born 1987), Chinese motorcycle racer
