= Herschel the sea lion =

Famous Seattle sea lion

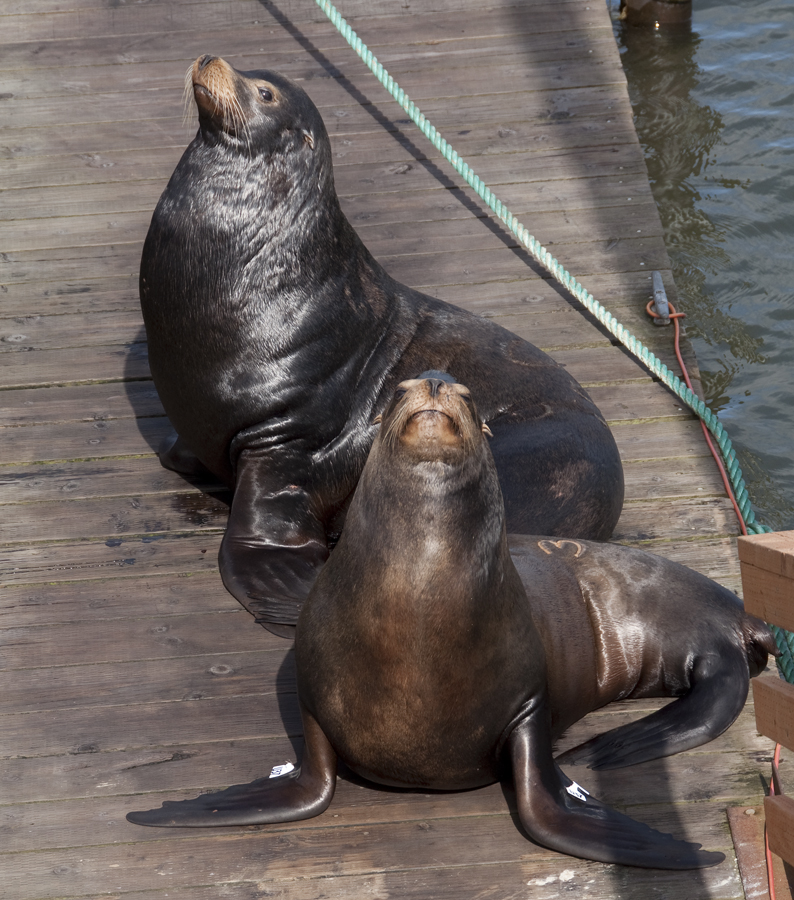
California sea lions

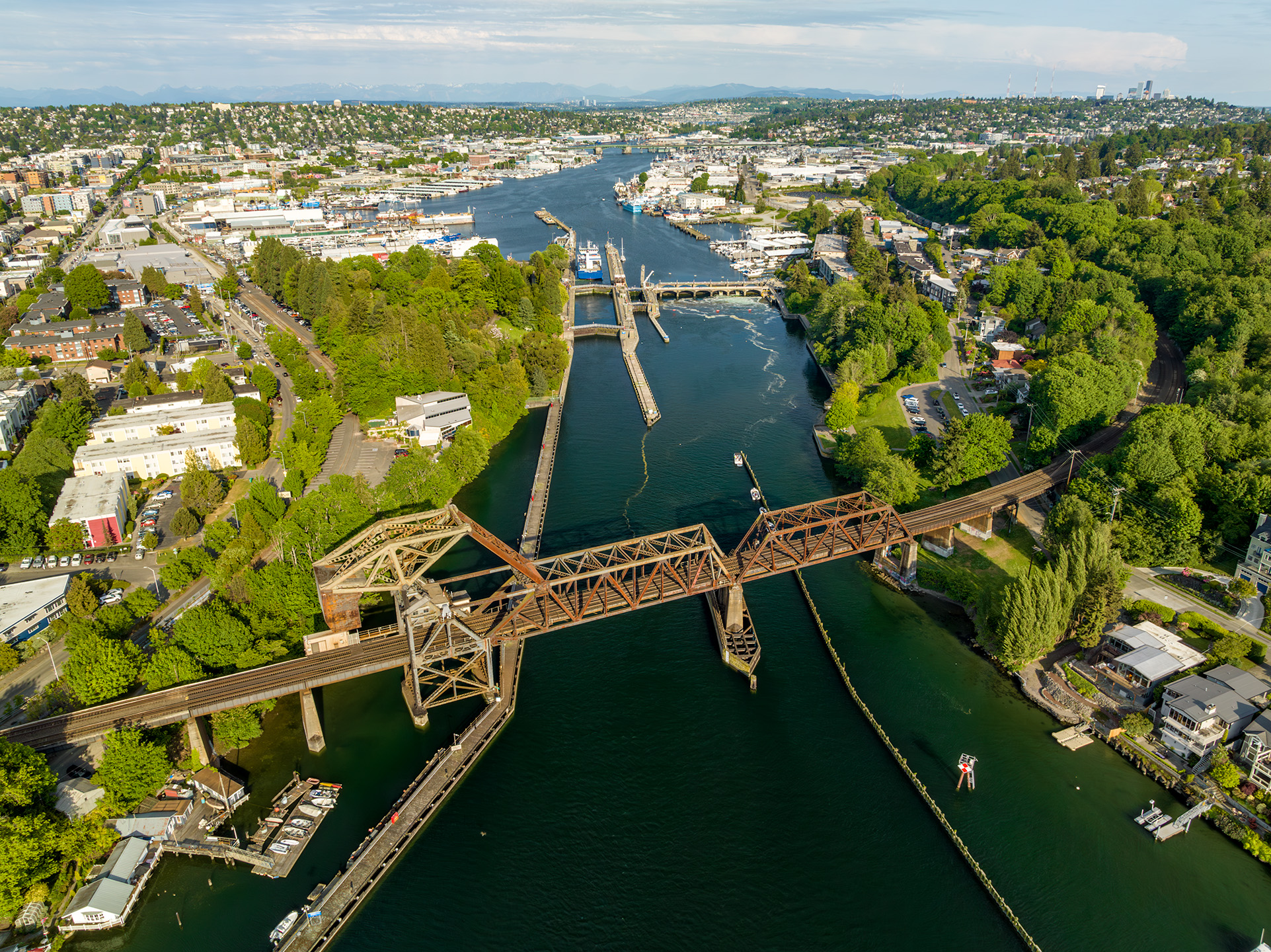
Looking upstream at the Ballard Locks

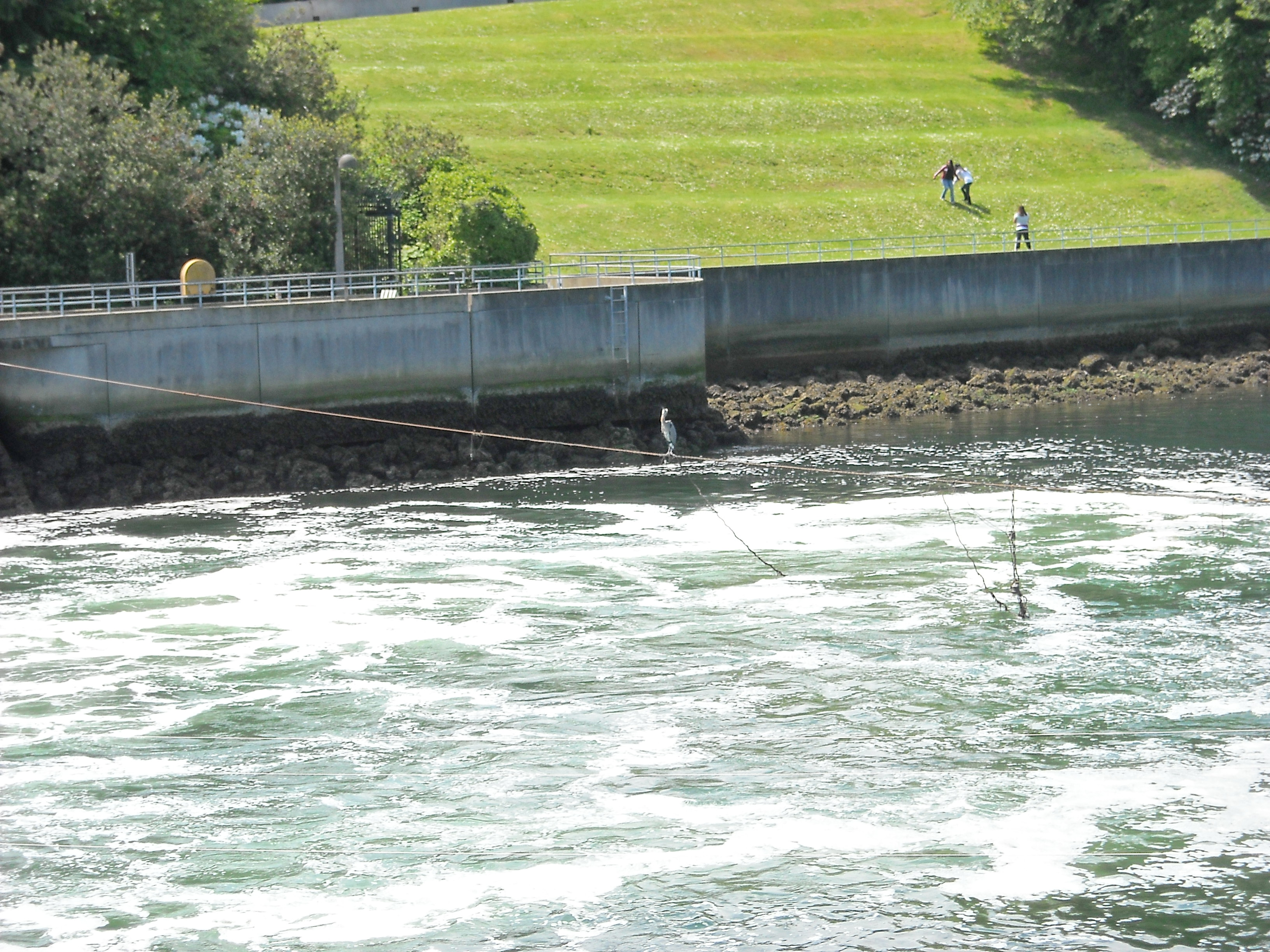
The lower estuary area where sea lions would congregate

Herschel the sea lion was the moniker given to a series of male California sea lions in Seattle, Washington, United States. Herschel took up seasonal residence in the early to mid-1980s on the saltwater side of Seattle's Salmon Bay at the Ballard Locks where salmon runs were funneled into the fish ladder. Due to the volume of fish the groups would consume, attempts at deterring or removing Herschel and other young males became a yearly process that gained national media attention.

== Name origin and fame ==
One story for the origin of the epithet "Herschel" is that when the first sea lion was spotted near the Ballard Locks, a fisherman called out "Oh hey, that looks like old Herschel that I used to work with down at the docks".

The original Herschel the sea lion was estimated to weigh between 300–400 kg (660–880 lb) and was one of the largest in his group of young males. It is thought that the original returned for several years in the early 1980s only, and from the mid-1980s through early 1990s, the name was given to the largest male of the wintering group. The sea lions attracted local and national fame due to the controversy around the steelhead run impacts. The Associated Press reported a condo near the Ballard Locks displaying a sign reading "Herschels Sushi Bar", while another sign was reported to "keep score" between the game agency and Herschel.

== Decline of steelhead population ==
The Lake Washington watershed steelhead runs were placed in a vulnerable position when the locks were completed, as fish in each run were bottlenecked by the fish ladder. Additionally, the fish would spend several days resting in the estuarine area directly below the locks while undergoing the metabolic changes needed for the shift from salt to fresh water. Herschel became a focus of blame for the rapidly dwindling steelhead runs, which in 1984, numbered only 464, down from over 2500 in 1983. The cause for steelhead decline was not universally blamed on Herschel, however, with a Greenpeace spokesperson in 1985 questioning the impact of one to four sea lions. They asserted the detrimental effects of human impact such as oil, sewage, chemical runoff, or logging, and overfishing on the runs were being ignored.

== Attempted deterrents ==
Serious efforts to deter Herschel and other sea lions from the Ballard Locks fish ladder area were first attempted during the winter of 1986, with game agents monitoring the area daily from January through March. During the week of January 8, 1986, game agents attempted a harassment program using waterproofed firecrackers, nicknamed "seal bombs", in an effort to frighten away Herschel and other sea lions who had returned that winter to feed on the trout run.

By December 1985, Greenpeace had weighed in on the controversy, stating opposition to proposals of relocating Herschel.

A bill to escalate the severity of actions allowed for use by the game agents was led by Jack Metcalf, then head of the Senate Natural Resources and Environmental committee. On March 2, 1989, the Washington Senate majority voted to pass legislation allowing for the killing of seals and sea lions threatening fish runs by a margin of 34 to 12. In the lead-up to the Senate vote, some proponents of the bill wore buttons with the slogan "Take a bite out of Herschel". From there, it was passed to the Washington House of Representatives. Senate opponents of the bill argued passing the bill would put state game agents at odds with the federal Marine Mammal Protection Act at the time, which required an in-depth study of the populations and impacts.

By August 1994, Washington Department of Fish and Wildlife officials were looking at two options as sea lion deterrents, though it is likely that by the 1990s, the original Herschel had died, with the name then being used for any sea lion seen in the Ballard Locks area. With the re-authorization of the Marine Mammal Protection Act earlier in 1994, a provision was added called the "nuisance clause" which specifically called out the sea lions of the Ballard Locks. Under the clause as then written, Fish & Wildlife officials had the option of taking lethal steps against problem individual animals. An application was granted for lethal measures in fall 1994, with five identified sea lions specifically called out as "predatory". The specific authorization was never invoked for sea lions in the Ballard Locks area, due to pressure from conservation groups and intervention by then Vice President Al Gore.

== Legacy ==
The steelhead runs by the mid-1990s had dwindled to fewer than 200 individuals a year and, with the loss of large food volumes at the Ballard Locks, the overwintering sea lion population dropped to a few solitary individuals. The three largest of the remaining sea lions, "Bob", "Big Frank", and "Hondo", were trapped and shipped via FedEx to Sea World Orlando, where they lived out their lives with a harem of females. Increased understanding of male sea lion biology and morphology is credited to the decade and a half spent trying to manage and mitigate the impact of the "Herschel" and the other males that overwintered in the locks. Pre-1980 adult size estimates for males topped out at 800 lb (360 kg), while the current understanding is of males regularly exceeding 1,000 lb (450 kg) and the largest on record topping 1,320 lb (600 kg).
