= John L. Loos =

American historian

John Louis Loos
- Born: March 9, 1918; Friend, Nebraska, U.S.
- Died: September 25, 2011 (aged 93); Lafayette, Louisiana, U.S.
- Resting place: Harvard Cemetery, Harvard, Nebraska, U.S.
- Education: University of Nebraska; Washington University in St. Louis
- Occupations: Historian; Professor at Louisiana State University
- Years active: 1948–1988
- Spouse: Helen Nunn Loos
- Children: 2

President of the Louisiana Historical Association
- In office 1976–1977
- Preceded by: Morgan D. Peoples
- Succeeded by: Joy Juanita Jackson

John Louis Loos (March 9, 1918 – September 25, 2011) was an American historian best known for his scholarship on the Lewis and Clark Expedition of 1804 to 1806. A Nebraska native, for 34 years Loos was a faculty member at Louisiana State University in Baton Rouge, Louisiana.

== Early years ==
The son of John George Loos (1896–1976) and Katherine Pauley Loos (1895–1981), Loos was born in Friend in Saline County in southeastern Nebraska. The family subsequently moved to Lushton, Nebraska and then (during the middle of the Great Depression) on to Harvard, Nebraska where in 1935 Loos graduated from Harvard High School. Loos obtained a Bachelor of Arts degree in 1939 and a Master of Arts in 1940, both in history from the University of Nebraska in Lincoln, where he was Regent Scholar and a member of Phi Beta Kappa.

During World War II, Loos was stationed in the Pacific Theater of Operations with the United States Army. An artillery officer promoted to major, he received the Bronze Star for meritorious service.

Loos was an assistant professor of history from 1948 to 1951 at Evansville College in Evansville, Indiana. He received his Ph.D. in history from Washington University in St. Louis, Missouri. From 1953 to 1955, he was an instructor at the John Burroughs School, a private college preparatory school in Ladue, Missouri, an affluent suburb of St. Louis.

== Academic career ==
Loos came to LSU in 1955. There he specialized in the history of the American West, with emphasis on the life of William Clark, partner of Meriwether Lewis in the Corps of Discovery, which followed the Missouri River to the Pacific Ocean near what is now Astoria, Oregon. The year before he came to LSU, the Missouri Historical Society published Loos's William Clark's Part in the Preparation of the Lewis and Clark Expedition (1954), a manuscript of 511 pages. Loos in 1964 published "They Opened the Door to the West", a six-page article on Lewis and Clark useful for lecturers seeking a concise summary of the expedition.

For a quarter century Loos was the chairman of the Department of History. For a time he was interim dean of the LSU College of Arts and Sciences. In 1983, he was named an LSU "alumni professor"; in 1988, upon mandatory retirement at the age of seventy, he was honored as professor emeritus. From 1976 to 1977, he was president of the Louisiana Historical Association. He was also affiliated with the Organization of American Historians.

In addition to his work on Lewis and Clark, Loos also published:

- The American Presidents (1986), with co-authors Tracy Irons-Georges and Frank Northern Magill
- Great Events from History: North American Series, 1895–1955, with co-author Frank Magill.
- Oil on Stream! A History of Interstate Oil Pipe Line Company, 1909-1959, published in 1959 by Louisiana State University Press

== Legacy ==
Loos died at the age of ninety-three at a nursing facility in Lafayette, Louisiana; he was buried in Harvard, Nebraska.

LSU launched in 2005 the John L. Loos Professorship in History. The first recipient, David Culbert, is an historian of film and media.

In December 2011, the American Historical Association honored Loos with a memorial article on his career written by Gaines M. Foster, who recalls that Loos

frequently roamed the halls, dropping into offices, talking with everyone, keeping them informed, and, without ever saying so, assuring them that they were important. He rarely created a committee, saw little point in departmental meetings, and never called one until he knew what the vote would be. Some saw him as a benevolent dictator who always got his way; more acute observers often wondered what John himself really wanted to happen. He had an amazing ability to create consensus. In part it was because he listened and everyone trusted him. It also resulted from his willingness to accept responsibility and absorb blame, rather than deflect both, like so many administrators.

| Preceded by Morgan D. Peoples | President of the Louisiana Historical Association; 1976–1977 | Succeeded by Joy Juanita Jackson |
