= Andy (goose) =

Goose without feet (1987–1991)

- Andy (on the left) with his owner Gene Fleming
- Species: Domestic goose
- Sex: Male
- Born: 1987; Harvard, Nebraska, U.S.
- Died: October 19, 1991 (aged 3–4); Hastings, Nebraska, U.S.

Andy (1987 – October 19, 1991) was a goose hatched without feet. He was well known for wearing sneakers to help him stand and walk. He was killed in 1991 by an unnamed perpetrator.

== Background ==
The goose hatched in 1987 without feet and lived on a farm in Harvard, Nebraska. When Andy was two years old, Gene Fleming from nearby Hastings became aware of the bird's plight. Fleming was an inventor and member of a local charity for disabled children, and he thought he could help. Fleming took care of Andy and his mate, Polly, and moved them to his farm in Hastings. Fleming's granddaughter, Jessica, named him after a girl with whom she got into a fight in junior high school.

Initial failed attempts at providing Andy with more mobility included a skateboard-like prosthesis. Fleming then fitted Andy with specially adapted baby-sized shoes, and he successfully taught the bird to walk with them. Subsequently, Andy caught the attention of the media and Nike, which offered a lifetime deal to supply shoes for Andy – the bird wore out a pair of shoes in about one month. At one point, Andy and Gene appeared on The Tonight Show with Johnny Carson.

Andy became a role model, especially for disabled children. With his shoes, Andy was able to walk, swim, and fly; his owners hoped Andy's mobility would give hope to people with disabilities.

Andy disappeared on October 19, 1991, and was found dead the next day in a local park with his head and wings ripped off. The community collected US$10,000 (equivalent to $23,638 in 2025) as a reward to apprehend the killer; however, the perpetrator could not be identified. According to former Chamber of Commerce president Don Reynolds, police identified the killer but did not reveal their identity to the public as they were "somebody that was not responsible".

== See also ==
- List of individual birds
