= Harvard, Nebraska =

- City
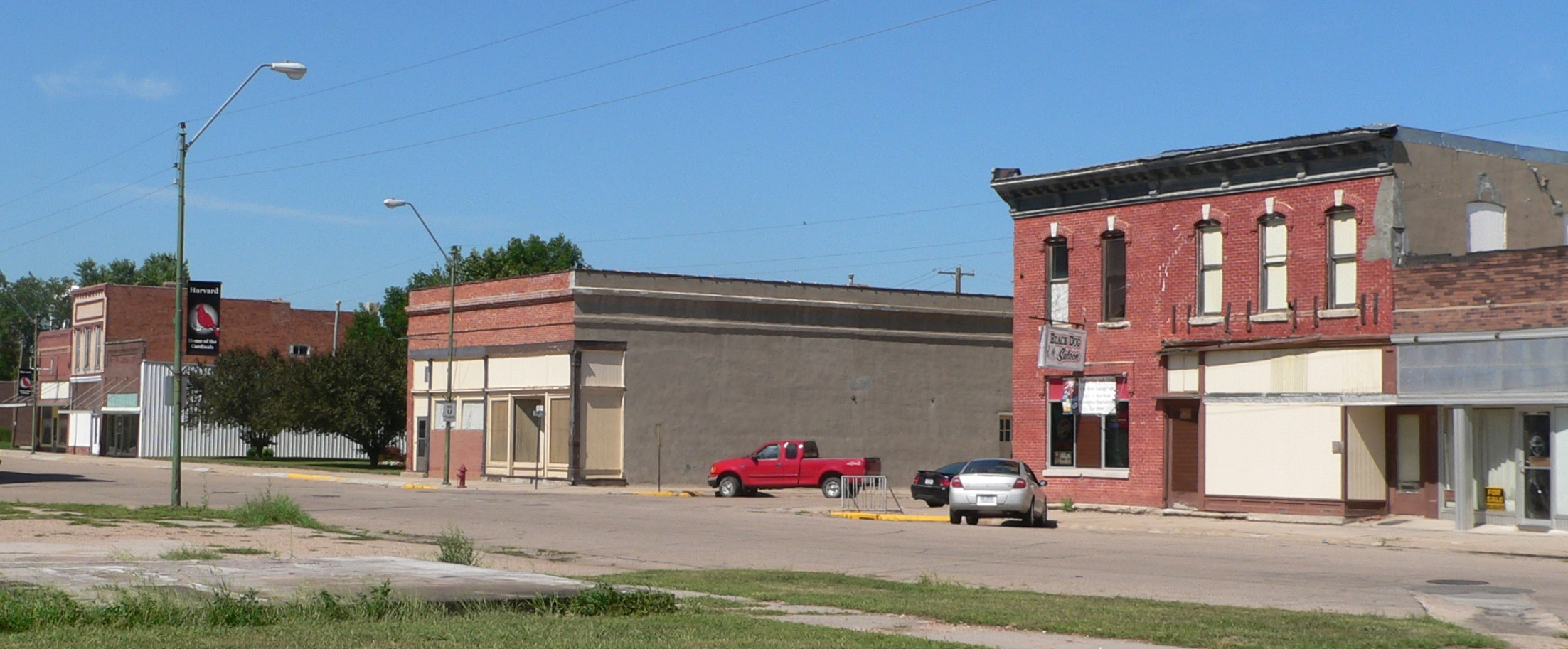
- Downtown Harvard: east side of Clay Avenue

- Location of Harvard, Nebraska
- Coordinates: 40°37′12″N 98°05′46″W
- Country: United States
- State: Nebraska
- County: Clay

Area
  - Total: 0.64 sq mi (1.67 km^{2})
  - Land: 0.64 sq mi (1.67 km^{2})
  - Water: 0 sq mi (0.00 km^{2})
- Elevation: 1,801 ft (549 m)

Population (2020)
  - Total: 951
  - Density: 1,475.4/sq mi (569.66/km^{2})
- Time zone: UTC-6 (Central (CST))
  - Summer (DST): UTC-5 (CDT)
- ZIP code: 68944
- Area code: 402
- FIPS code: 31-21345
- GNIS feature ID: 2394316
- Website: www.harvardnebraska.com/

Harvard is a city in Clay County, Nebraska, United States. As of the 2020 census, Harvard had a population of 951. It is part of the Hastings micropolitan area.

== History ==
Harvard was founded in 1871 when the railroad was extended to that point. It was named after Harvard University, in Massachusetts.

== Geography ==
According to the United States Census Bureau, the city has a total area of 0.65 square miles (1.68 km^{2}), all land.

== Demographics ==
Historical population
Census	Pop.	Note	%±
1880	768		—
1890	1,076		40.1%
1900	849		−21.1%
1910	1,102		29.8%
1920	991		−10.1%
1930	865		−12.7%
1940	704		−18.6%
1950	774		9.9%
1960	1,261		62.9%
1970	1,230		−2.5%
1980	1,217		−1.1%
1990	976		−19.8%
2000	998		2.3%
2010	1,013		1.5%
2020	951		−6.1%
U.S. Decennial Census

=== 2010 census ===
As of the census of 2010, there were 1,013 people, 372 households, and 248 families living in the city. The population density was 1,558.5 inhabitants per square mile (601.7/km^{2}). There were 453 housing units at an average density of 696.9 per square mile (269.1/km^{2}). The racial makeup of the city was 78.9% White, 0.2% African American, 0.6% Native American, 0.3% Asian, 15.8% from other races, and 4.2% from two or more races. Hispanic or Latino of any race were 23.7% of the population.

There were 372 households, of which 37.4% had children under the age of 18 living with them, 49.2% were married couples living together, 10.8% had a female householder with no husband present, 6.7% had a male householder with no wife present, and 33.3% were non-families. 29.8% of all households were made up of individuals, and 13.7% had someone living alone who was 65 years of age or older. The average household size was 2.63 and the average family size was 3.23.

The median age in the city was 36.9 years. 29.3% of residents were under the age of 18; 7.9% were between the ages of 18 and 24; 20.5% were from 25 to 44; 27.4% were from 45 to 64; and 14.7% were 65 years of age or older. The gender makeup of the city was 49.3% male and 50.7% female.

=== 2000 census ===
As of the census of 2000, there were 998 people, 385 households, and 259 families living in the city. The population density was 1,558.9 inhabitants per square mile (601.9/km^{2}). There were 450 housing units at an average density of 702.9 per square mile (271.4/km^{2}). The racial makeup of the city was 95.19% White, 0.10% African American, 0.70% Native American, 0.10% Asian, 3.21% from other races, and 0.70% from two or more races. Hispanic or Latino of any race were 12.32% of the population.

There were 385 households, out of which 31.7% had children under the age of 18 living with them, 56.6% were married couples living together, 7.8% had a female householder with no husband present, and 32.7% were non-families. 28.6% of all households were made up of individuals, and 13.2% had someone living alone who was 65 years of age or older. The average household size was 2.51 and the average family size was 3.08.

In the city, the population was spread out, with 28.3% under the age of 18, 7.3% from 18 to 24, 23.8% from 25 to 44, 22.3% from 45 to 64, and 18.2% who were 65 years of age or older. The median age was 39 years. For every 100 females, there were 90.5 males. For every 100 females age 18 and over, there were 84.5 males.

The median income for a household in the city was $29,350, and the median income for a family was $32,031. Males had a median income of $26,667 versus $17,159 for females. The per capita income for the city was $13,077. About 12.5% of families and 15.2% of the population were below the poverty line, including 16.4% of those under age 18 and 10.7% of those age 65 or over.

== Notable people ==
- John L. Loos – American historian
- Billy Southworth – Baseball Hall of Fame Manager who led the Cardinals to two World Series Championships.
- Paul Revere – American musician and leader of the band Paul Revere and the Raiders

== Notable geese ==
- Andy, American goose born without feet.
