= Friend, Nebraska =

City in Saline County, Nebraska, United States

- City
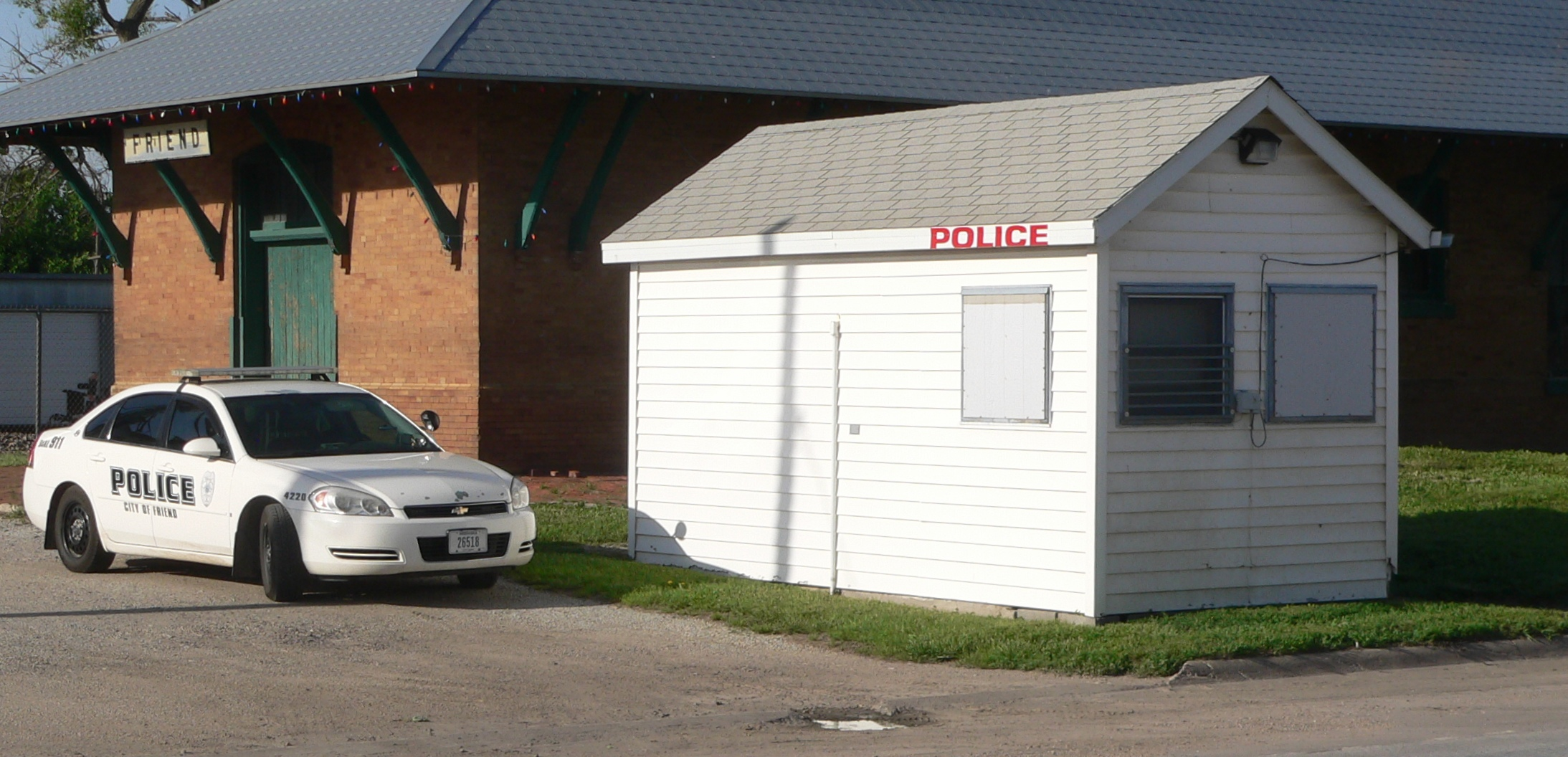
- Friend police station, May 2013

- Location of Friend, Nebraska
- Coordinates: 40°39′02″N 97°17′02″W
- Country: United States
- State: Nebraska
- County: Saline

Area
  - Total: 0.83 sq mi (2.14 km^{2})
  - Land: 0.83 sq mi (2.14 km^{2})
  - Water: 0 sq mi (0.00 km^{2})
- Elevation: 1,558 ft (475 m)

Population (2020)
  - Total: 954
  - Density: 1,153.5/sq mi (445.38/km^{2})
- Time zone: UTC-6 (Central (CST))
  - Summer (DST): UTC-5 (CDT)
- ZIP code: 68359
- Area code: 402
- FIPS code: 31-17775
- GNIS feature ID: 2394827
- Website: City of Friend

Friend is a city in Saline County, Nebraska, United States. As of the 2020 census, the city population was 954.

== History ==
The city is named for Charles E. Friend, who homesteaded the land and initially named the community Friendville. He operated a dry goods store and post office. In 1873 the Burlington and Missouri River Railroad named its new train station there "Friend."

The National Greyhound Association was founded in the community in 1906 (called at the time National Coursing Association).

The Friend Police Department, which was initially housed in a tool shed during construction of U.S. Route 6, was reported by Ripley's Believe It or Not! to be the smallest police station in the world. In the 1960s, the shed doubled in size so the Nebraska State Patrol could also be stationed there to issue traffic citations and make arrests. Afterwards, Friend still claimed to have the smallest combined police station. It was demolished in 2015 and replaced with a neon Friend sign.

== Geography ==
According to the United States Census Bureau, the city has a total area of 0.83 square miles (2.15 km^{2}), all land.

== Demographics ==
Historical population
Census	Pop.	Note	%±
1880	555		—
1890	1,347		142.7%
1900	1,200		−10.9%
1910	1,261		5.1%
1920	1,263		0.2%
1930	1,214		−3.9%
1940	1,169		−3.7%
1950	1,148		−1.8%
1960	1,069		−6.9%
1970	1,126		5.3%
1980	1,079		−4.2%
1990	1,111		3.0%
2000	1,174		5.7%
2010	1,027		−12.5%
2020	954		−7.1%
U.S. Decennial Census

=== 2010 census ===
As of the census of 2010, there were 1,027 people, 431 households, and 292 families residing in the city. The population density was 1,237.3 inhabitants per square mile (477.7/km^{2}). There were 501 housing units at an average density of 603.6 per square mile (233.1/km^{2}). The racial makeup of the city was 98.1% White, 0.4% African American, 0.1% Native American, 0.4% Asian, 0.4% from other races, and 0.6% from two or more races. Hispanic or Latino of any race were 2.4% of the population.

There were 431 households, of which 27.4% had children under the age of 18 living with them, 60.3% were married couples living together, 4.9% had a female householder with no husband present, 2.6% had a male householder with no wife present, and 32.3% were non-families. 30.2% of all households were made up of individuals, and 16% had someone living alone who was 65 years of age or older. The average household size was 2.30 and the average family size was 2.82.

The median age in the city was 47.9 years. 22.3% of residents were under the age of 18; 4% were between the ages of 18 and 24; 20% were from 25 to 44; 29% were from 45 to 64; and 24.7% were 65 years of age or older. The gender makeup of the city was 47.2% male and 52.8% female.

=== 2000 census ===
As of the census of 2000, there were 1,174 people, 475 households, and 326 families residing in the city. The population density was 1,473.4 inhabitants per square mile (568.9/km^{2}). There were 516 housing units at an average density of 647.6 per square mile (250.0/km^{2}). The racial makeup of the city was 98.64% White, 0.26% Native American, 0.34% from other races, and 0.77% from two or more races. Hispanic or Latino of any race were 0.85% of the population.

There were 475 households, out of which 29.1% had children under the age of 18 living with them, 61.9% were married couples living together, 4.4% had a female householder with no husband present, and 31.2% were non-families. 29.1% of all households were made up of individuals, and 16.4% had someone living alone who was 65 years of age or older. The average household size was 2.36 and the average family size was 2.92.

In the city, the population was spread out, with 24.8% under the age of 18, 4.6% from 18 to 24, 22.1% from 25 to 44, 21.6% from 45 to 64, and 26.8% who were 65 years of age or older. The median age was 44 years. For every 100 females, there were 89.0 males. For every 100 females age 18 and over, there were 88.7 males.

As of 2000 the median income for a household in the city was $34,833, and the median income for a family was $40,667. Males had a median income of $32,946 versus $17,829 for females. The per capita income for the city was $17,422. About 4.9% of families and 6.8% of the population were below the poverty line, including 7.3% of those under age 18 and 6.5% of those age 65 or over.

== Education ==
Friend Public Schools is the local school district.

== Notable people ==
- Elvin C. Drake, head track and field coach of the 1956 NCAA Champion UCLA Bruins
- John L. Loos, American historian born in Friend in 1918
- Anna Louise Strong, journalist and left-wing activist
- Thad Weber, professional baseball player (Detroit Tigers, San Diego Padres, Toronto Blue Jays)
- John William Miller, aviation engineer

== See also ==
- List of municipalities in Nebraska
