= Friend Public Schools =

School district in Nebraska, United States

Address
- 501 Main Street Friend, Saline County, Nebraska, 68359; United States

District information
- President: Jamie Tuttle
- Vice-president: Scott Spohn
- Superintendent: Derek Anderson
- School board: Nancy Vossler; Tiffany Shonerd; Megan Weber; Tyler Bartels
- Accreditation: State of Nebraska
- Schools: 2
- NCES District ID: 3100096

Students and staff
- Students: 240
- Teachers: 25
- Student–teacher ratio: 1:10
- District mascot: Bulldogs

Other information
- Website: www.emfbobcats.org

Friend Public Schools is a school district headquartered in Friend, Nebraska. It operates Friend Elementary School and Friend Junior-Senior High School.

In the 2022–2023 school year, the district enrolled a total of 242 students, including 28 in preschool, 120 in kindergarten through 6th grade, 38 in 7th and 8th grades, and 56 in 9th through 12th grades.

== Twitter account lawsuit ==
In 2017, a Twitter account criticizing officials and using the logo of the district had appeared. The district board asked for the owner to contact them. When this did not happen, the district filed a lawsuit to find the identity of the owner in 2019. According to the Lincoln Journal Star, the account's posts suggested that it was run by a teacher. The lawsuit was dismissed on March 12, 2019, and the Twitter account no longer exists.
