= Carl S. English Jr. Botanical Gardens =

Botanical garden in Seattle, Washington, U.S.

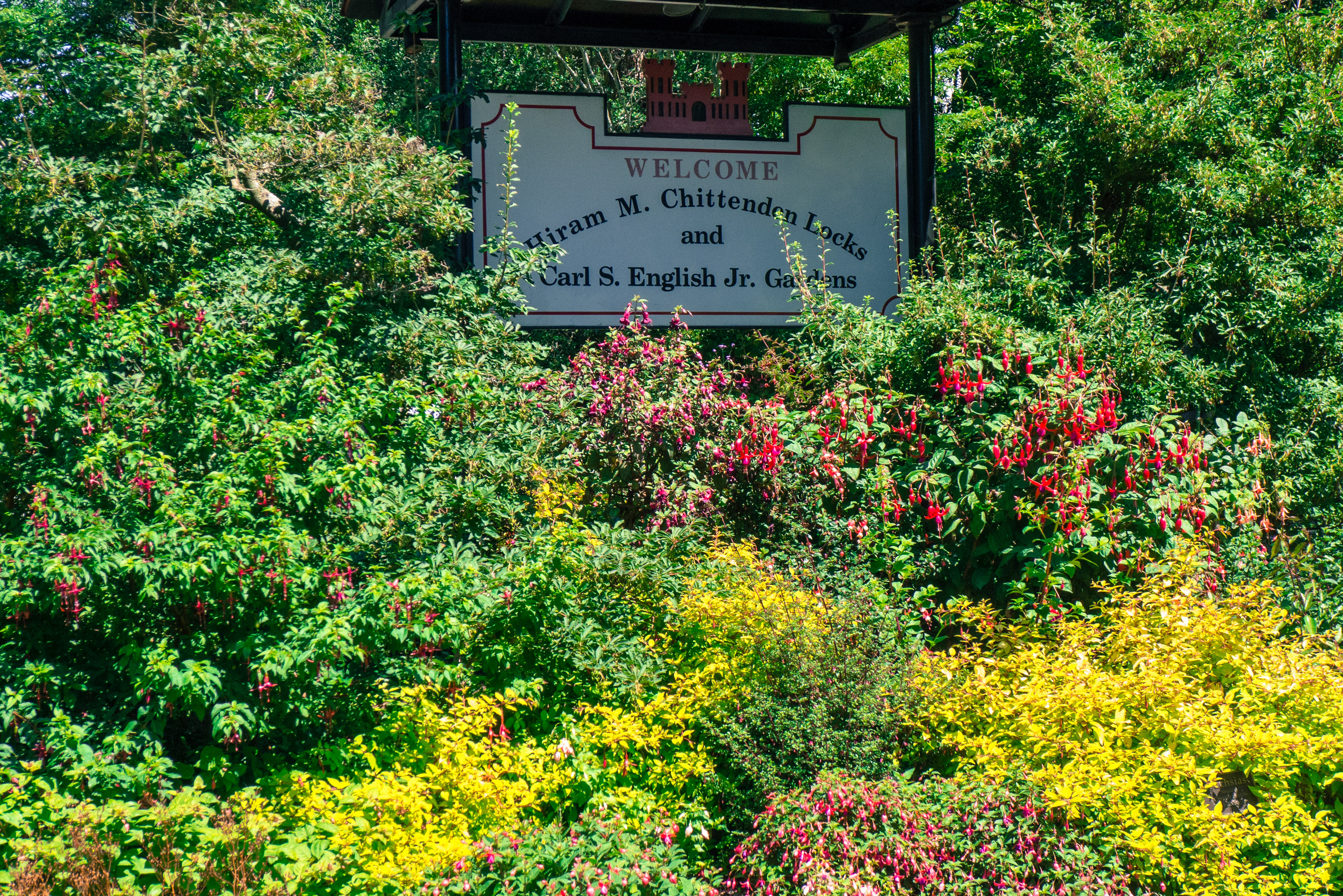
- Welcome sign at Ballard Locks and Carl S. English Gardens
- Interactive map of Carl S. English Jr. Botanical Gardens
- Type: Botanical garden
- Location: 3015 NW 54th Street, Seattle, Washington
- Area: 7 hectares (17 acres)
- Opened: 1931
- Plants: 1,500
- Species: 500
- Website: Official website

The Carl S. English Jr. Botanical Gardens (7 acres) are botanical gardens located on the grounds of the Hiram M. Chittenden Locks at 3015 NW 54th Street, Seattle, Washington.

== Description ==
The gardens contain more than 500 species and 1,500 varieties of plants from around the world, including fan palms, oaks, Mexican pines, rhododendrons, and a fine display of roses. The gardens also exhibit an extensive fuchsia display and a special section for lilies in season.

== History ==
In 1931, botanist Carl English was hired by the United States Army Corps of Engineers. Over 43 years of civil service, he transformed the site into an English style landscape.

== See also ==
- List of botanical gardens in the United States
