= Ballard Locks =

- Chittenden Locks and Lake Washington Ship Canal
- U.S. National Register of Historic Places
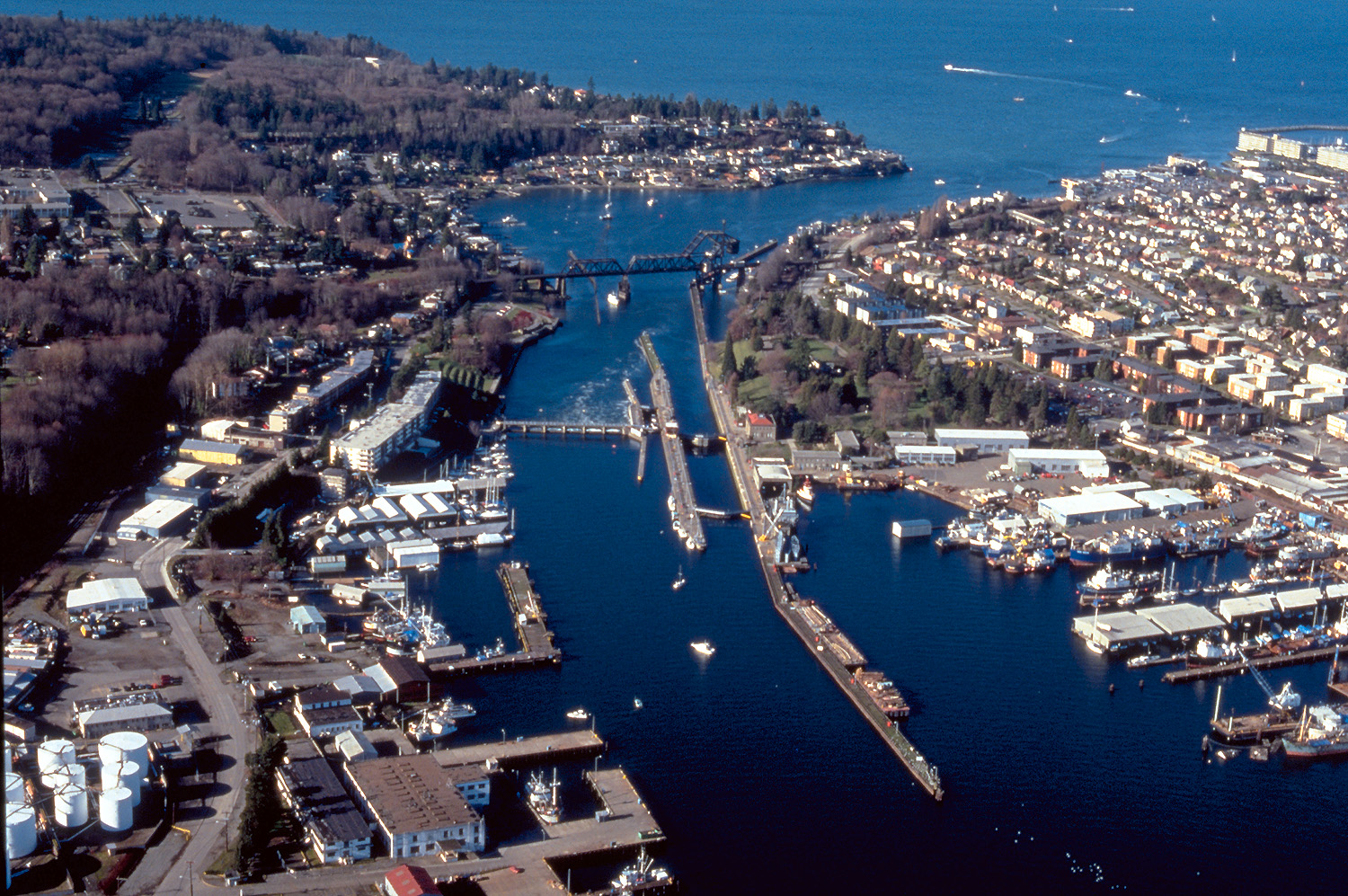
- An aerial view of the locks, facing west
- Location: Salmon Bay, Seattle, Washington
- Coordinates: 47°39′56″N 122°23′50″W
- Built: 1911–1917
- Architect: Charles A. D. Young (locks and dam); Bebb and Gould (support buildings)
- NRHP reference No.: 78002751
- Added to NRHP: December 14, 1978

The Hiram M. Chittenden Locks, or Ballard Locks, is a complex of locks at the west end of Salmon Bay in Seattle, Washington's Lake Washington Ship Canal, between the neighborhoods of Ballard to the north and Magnolia to the south.

The Ballard Locks carry more boat traffic than any other lock in the U.S., and the locks, along with the fish ladder and the surrounding Carl S. English Jr. Botanical Gardens, attract more than one million visitors annually, making it one of Seattle's top tourist attractions. The construction of the locks profoundly reshaped the topography of Seattle and the surrounding area, lowering the water level of Lake Washington and Lake Union by 8.8 feet (2.7 m), leaving existing piers high and dry, adding miles of new waterfront land, and reversing the flow of rivers. The Locks are listed on the National Register of Historic Places and have been designated by the American Society of Civil Engineers as a National Historic Civil Engineering Landmark.

== Prior to construction ==
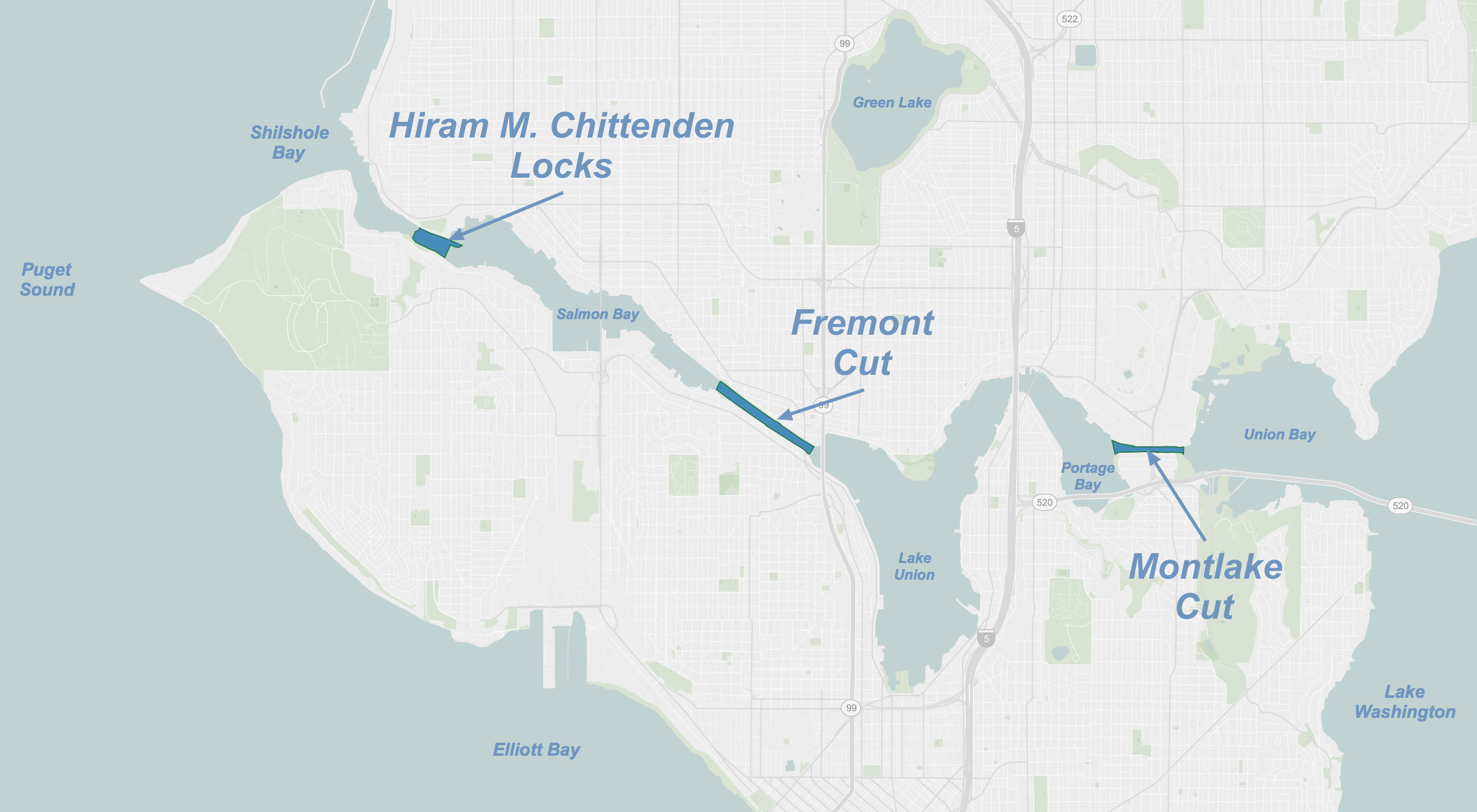
All sections of the Lake Washington Ship Canal, fully completed in 1934

As early as 1854, there was discussion of building a navigable connection between Lake Washington and Puget Sound for the purpose of transporting logs, milled lumber, and fishing vessels. Thirteen years later, the United States Navy endorsed a canal project, which included a plan for building a naval shipyard on Lake Washington. In 1891 the U.S. Army Corps of Engineers started planning the project. Some preliminary work was begun in 1906, and work began in earnest five years later under the command of Hiram M. Chittenden. The delays in canal planning and construction resulted in the US Navy building the Puget Sound Naval Shipyard in Bremerton, Washington, which is located across the Sound from Seattle.

== Construction ==
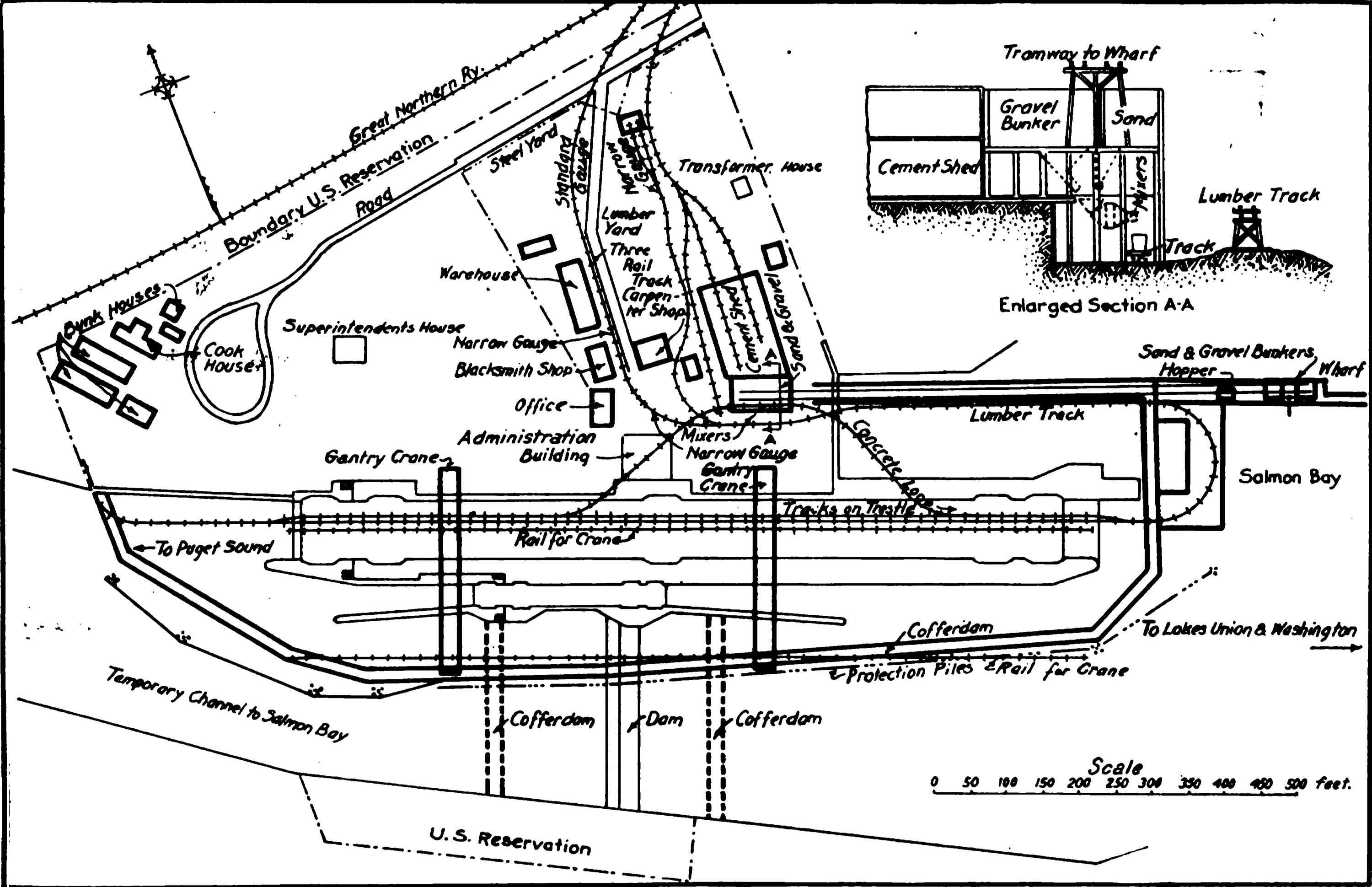
Construction plan of Locks complex, showing various cofferdams holding water back from locks under construction, cross section of locks, and location of surrounding buildings including Administration Building and Cavanaugh House.

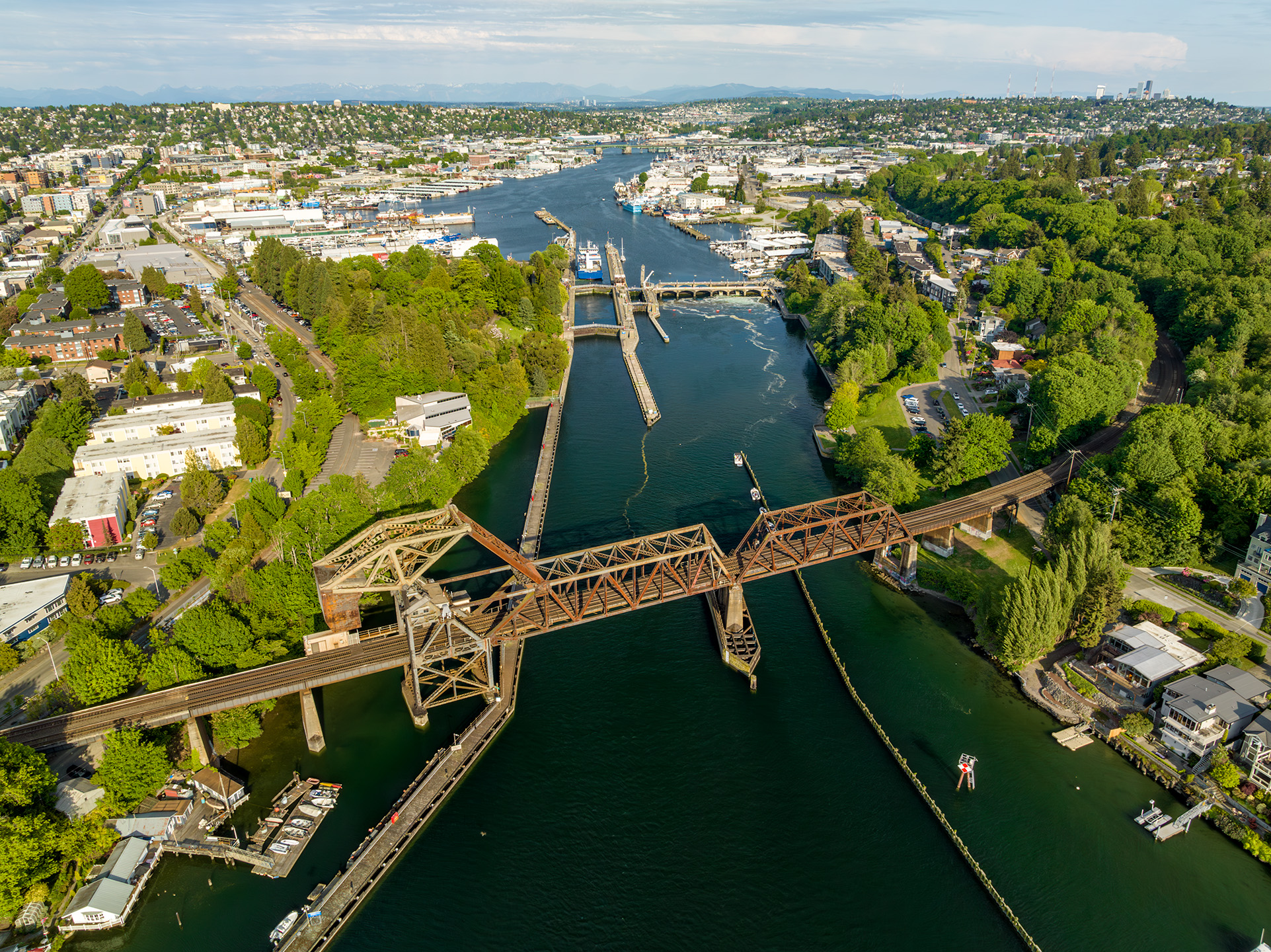
Aerial view of the locks from the west

In early 1909, the Washington State Legislature appropriated $250,000, placed under the control of the Corps of Engineers, for excavation of the canal between Lake Union and Lake Washington. In June 1910, the US Congress gave its approval for the lock, on the condition that the rest of the canals along the route be paid for locally. Construction was then delayed by legal challenges, mainly by mill owners in Ballard who feared property damage and loss of waterfront in Salmon Bay, and by Lake Washington property owners.

Under Major James. B. Cavanaugh, Chittenden's replacement as Seattle District Commander, construction of the Ballard, or Government, Locks connecting Salmon Bay to Shilshole Bay began in 1911, proceeding without further controversy or legal entanglements. In July 1912, the Locks gates were closed for the first time, turning Salmon Bay from saltwater to freshwater. The first ship passed through the locks on August 3, 1916. On August 25, 1916, the temporary dam at Montlake was breached. During the following three months, Lake Washington drained, lowering the water level by 8.8 ft (2.7 m) and drying up more than 1,000 acres (400 ha) of wetlands, as well as drying up the Black River and cutting off the Cedar River salmon run.

The Cedar River was rerouted into Lake Washington to provide sufficient water flow for operating the Locks. Additionally the White River was rerouted into the Puyallup River. The Cedar and White Rivers both originally flowed into the Duwamish causing frequent flooding. The rerouting of the rivers opened up huge lowland areas for development but significantly disrupted the Duwamish salmon runs. To rectify this problem, salmon runs were reintroduced allowing the fish to migrate through the locks. The locks officially opened for boat traffic on May 8, 1917. The total cost of the project to that point was $3.5 million, with $2.5 million having come from the federal government and the rest from local governments.

To allow for the intended boat traffic, three bridges were removed along the ship canal route, at Latona Avenue, Fremont, Stone Way. The Ballard and Fremont Bridges were completed in 1917, followed by the University Bridge in 1919, and Montlake Bridge in 1925. The University Bridge was improved in 1932, and in 1934 the Lake Washington Ship Canal project was declared complete.

While generally a success, the project was not without its problems. Salt water began to make its way upstream toward Lake Union, requiring a system of siphons and flushing mechanisms. Because the Cedar River was the main water source both for the lakes and locks and for Seattle's potable water, at times there were problems maintaining an adequate water supply to maintain lake level and operate the locks. Conversely, with several rivers redirected, flooding worsened throughout the watershed. That last problem was exacerbated by logging, and at times during storms the locks had to be opened just to allow water to flow out.

== Function ==
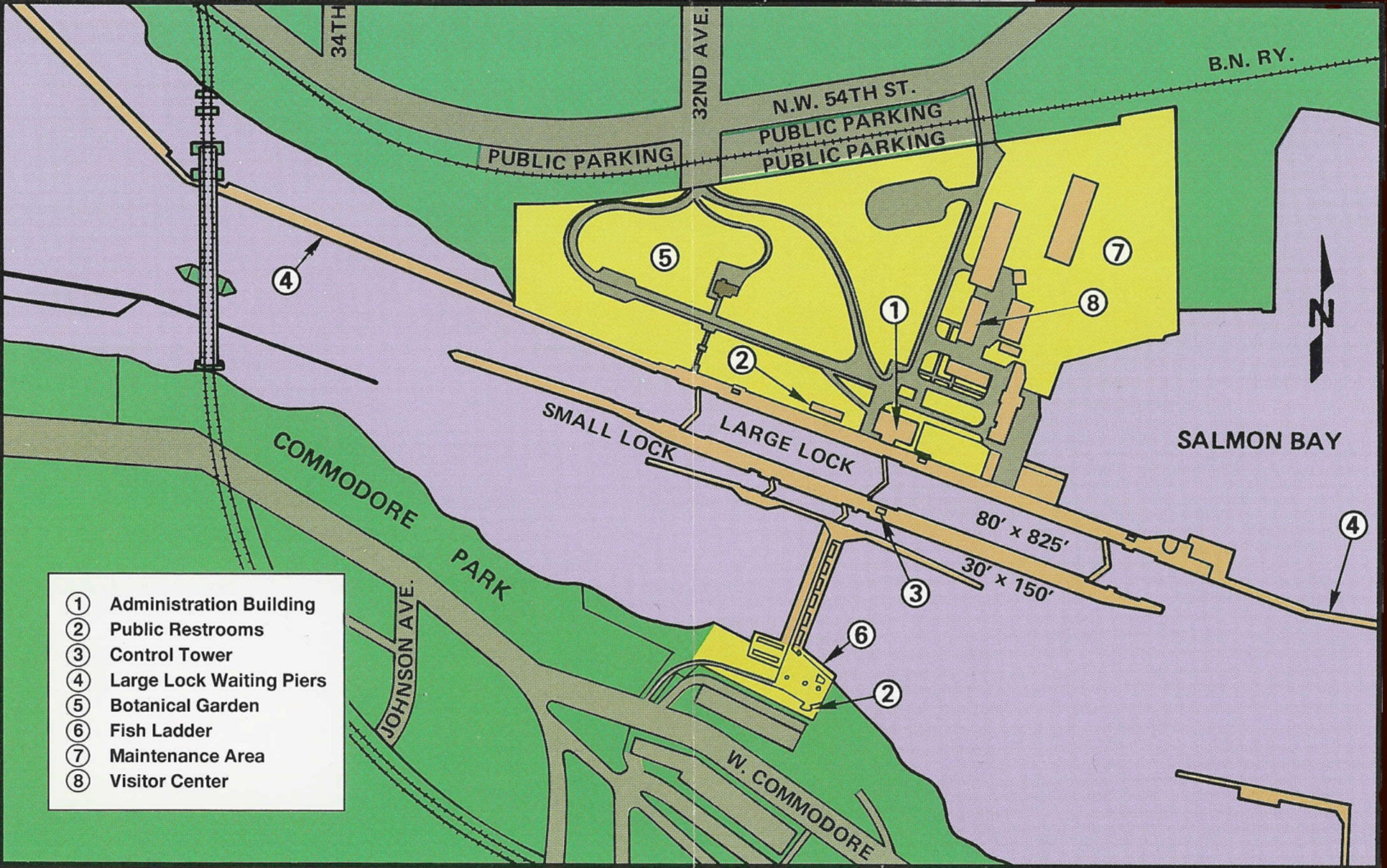
Ballard Locks and surrounding grounds

The locks and associated facilities serve three purposes:

- To maintain the water level of the fresh water Lake Washington and Lake Union at 20–22 feet (6.1–6.7 m) above sea level, or more specifically, 20.6 ft (6.3 m) above Puget Sound's mean low tide.
- To prevent the mixing of sea water from Puget Sound with the fresh water of the lakes (saltwater intrusion).
- To move boats from the water level of the lakes to the water level of Puget Sound, and vice versa.

The complex includes two locks, 30 ft × 150 ft (9.1 m × 45.7 m) (small) and 80 ft × 825 ft (24 m × 251 m) (large). The complex also includes a 235 ft (72 m) spillway with six 32 ft × 12 ft (9.8 m × 3.7 m) gates to assist in water-level control. A fish ladder is integrated into the locks for migration of anadromous fish, notably salmon.

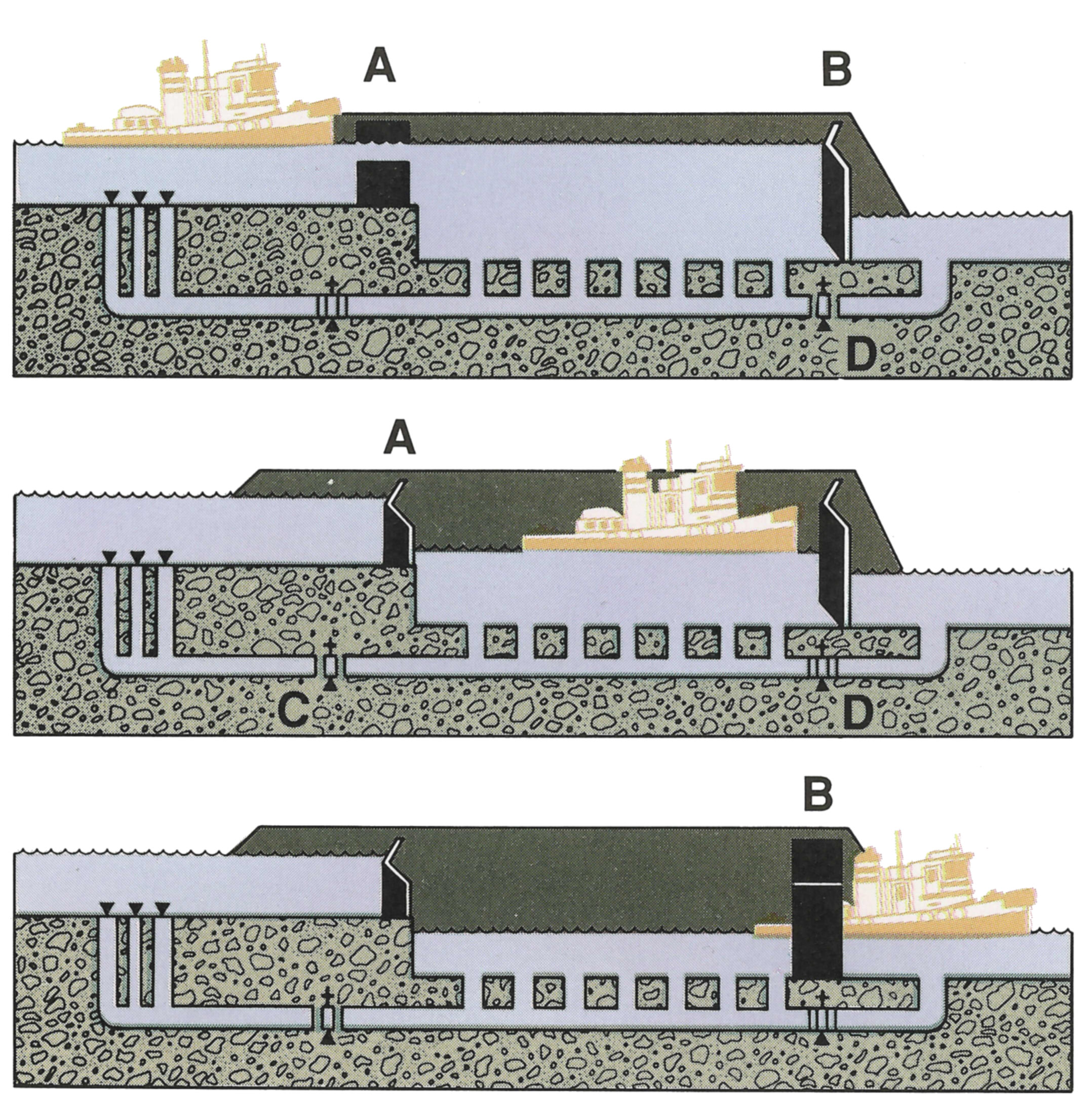

The grounds feature a visitors center, as well as the Carl S. English Jr. Botanical Gardens.

Operated by the US Army Corps of Engineers, the locks were formally opened on July 4, 1917, although the first ship passed on August 3, 1916. They were named after US Army Major Hiram M. Chittenden, the Seattle District Engineer for the Corps of Engineers from April 1906 to September 1908. They were added to the National Register of Historic Places in 1978.

Vessels passing from the freshwater Lakes Washington and Union to Puget Sound enter the lock chamber through the open upper gates (A in the accompanying diagram). The lower gates (B) and the draining valve (D) are closed. The vessel is assisted by the lockwall attendants who assure it is tied down and ready for the chamber to be drained.

Next, the upper gates (A) and the filling valve (C) are closed and the draining valve (D) is opened allowing water to drain via gravity out to Puget Sound.

When the water pressure is equal on both sides of the gate, the lower gates (B) are opened, allowing the vessels to leave the lock chamber.

The process is reversed for upstream locking.

== Locks ==
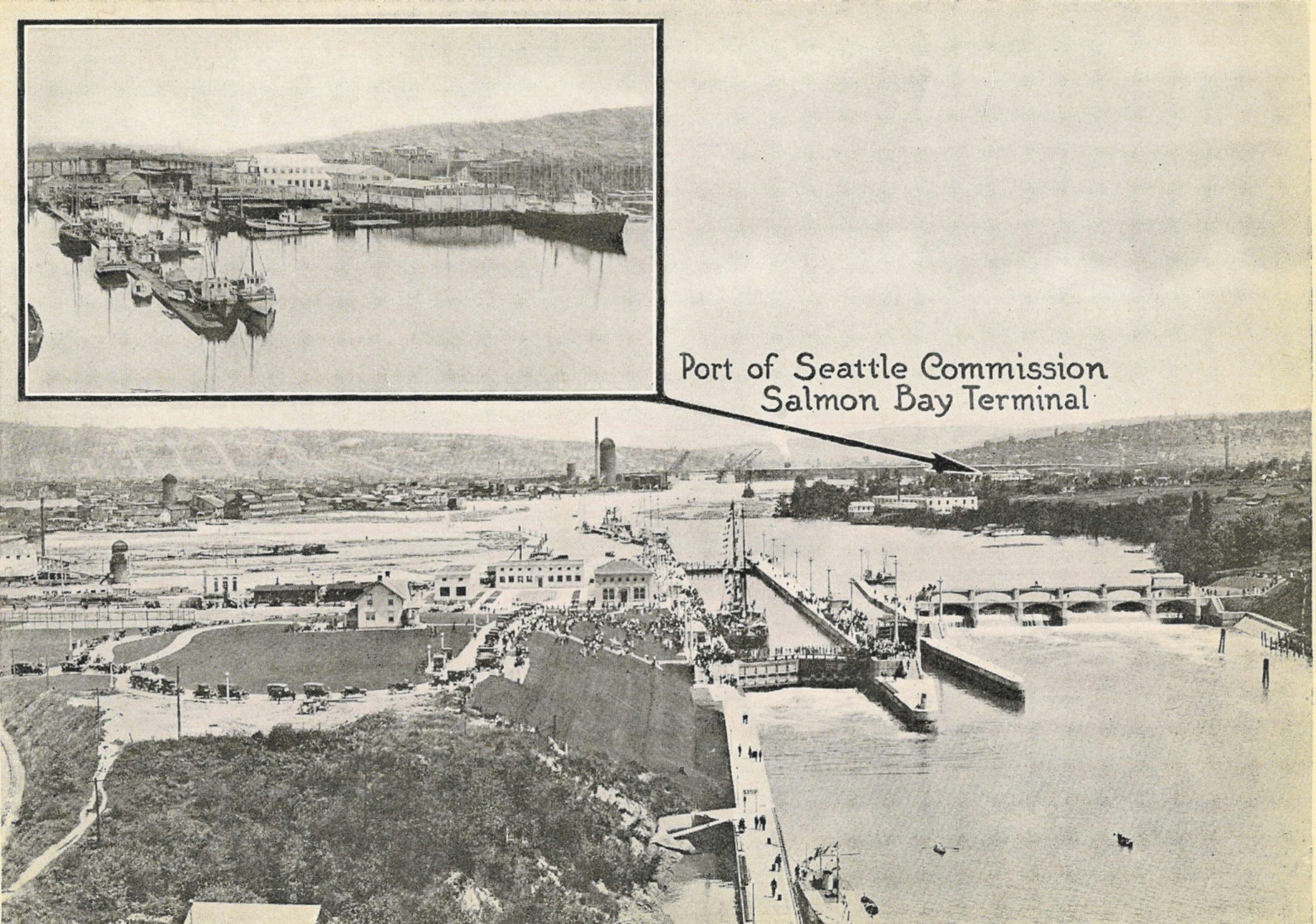
The Chittenden Locks shortly after their construction. The Carl P. English Gardens had not yet been started. The inset shows the nearby Fishermen's Terminal.

The complex includes two locks. Using the small lock when boat traffic is low conserves fresh water during summer, when the lakes receive less inflow. Having two locks also allows one of the locks to be drained for maintenance without blocking all boat traffic. The large lock is drained for approximately two weeks, usually in November, and the small lock is drained for about the same period, usually in March.

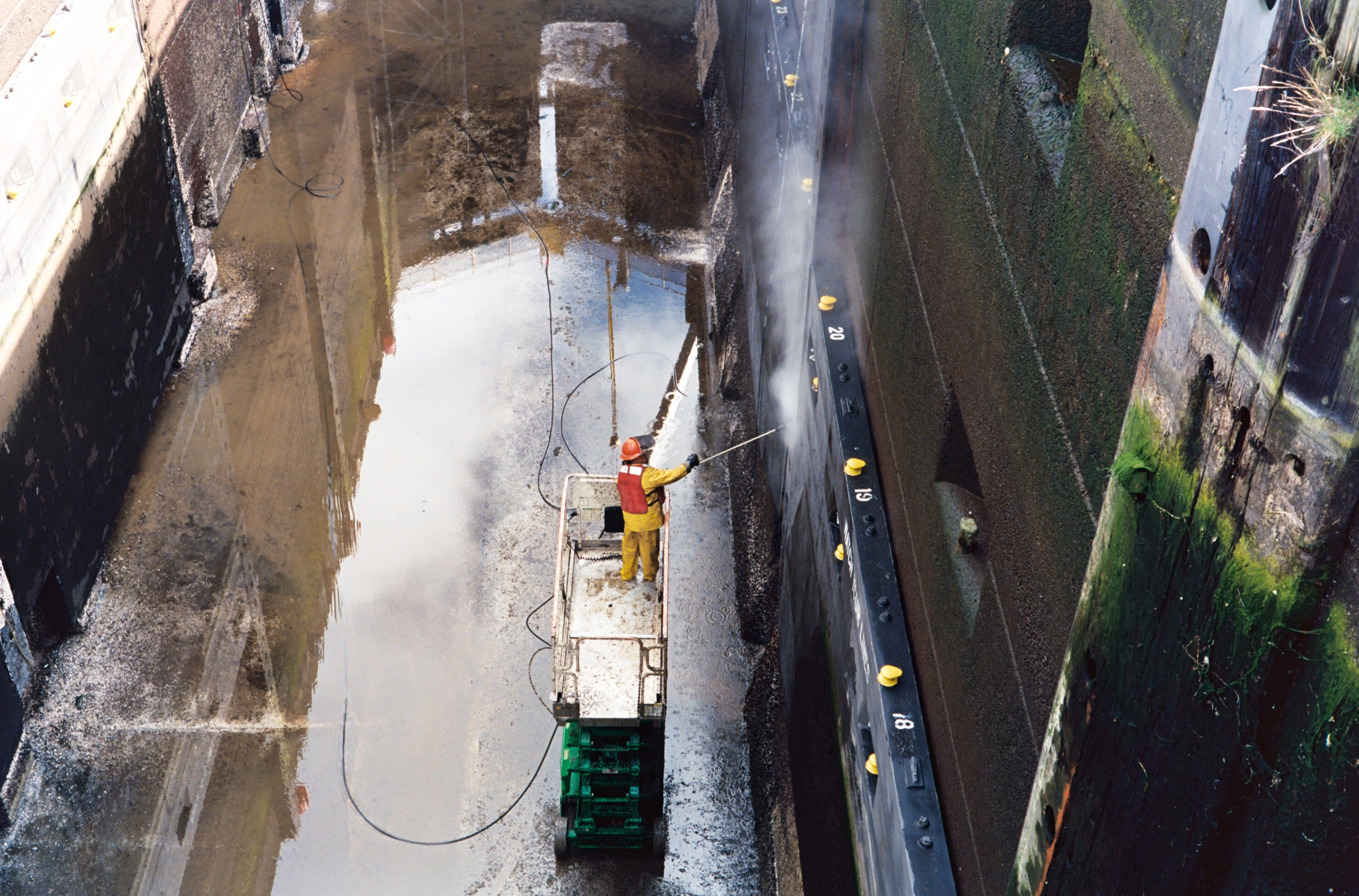
A worker cleaning the small lock during annual maintenance. Drying out the chambers allows inspection and repair. After cleaning, the walls are painted.

The locks can elevate a 760-by-80-foot (232 m × 24 m) vessel 26 ft (7.9 m), from the level of Puget Sound at a very low tide to the level of freshwater Salmon Bay, in 10–15 minutes. The locks handle both pleasure boats and commercial vessels, ranging from kayaks to fishing boats returning from the Bering Sea to cargo ships. Over 1 million tons of cargo, fuel, building materials, and seafood products pass through the locks each year.

== Spillway ==
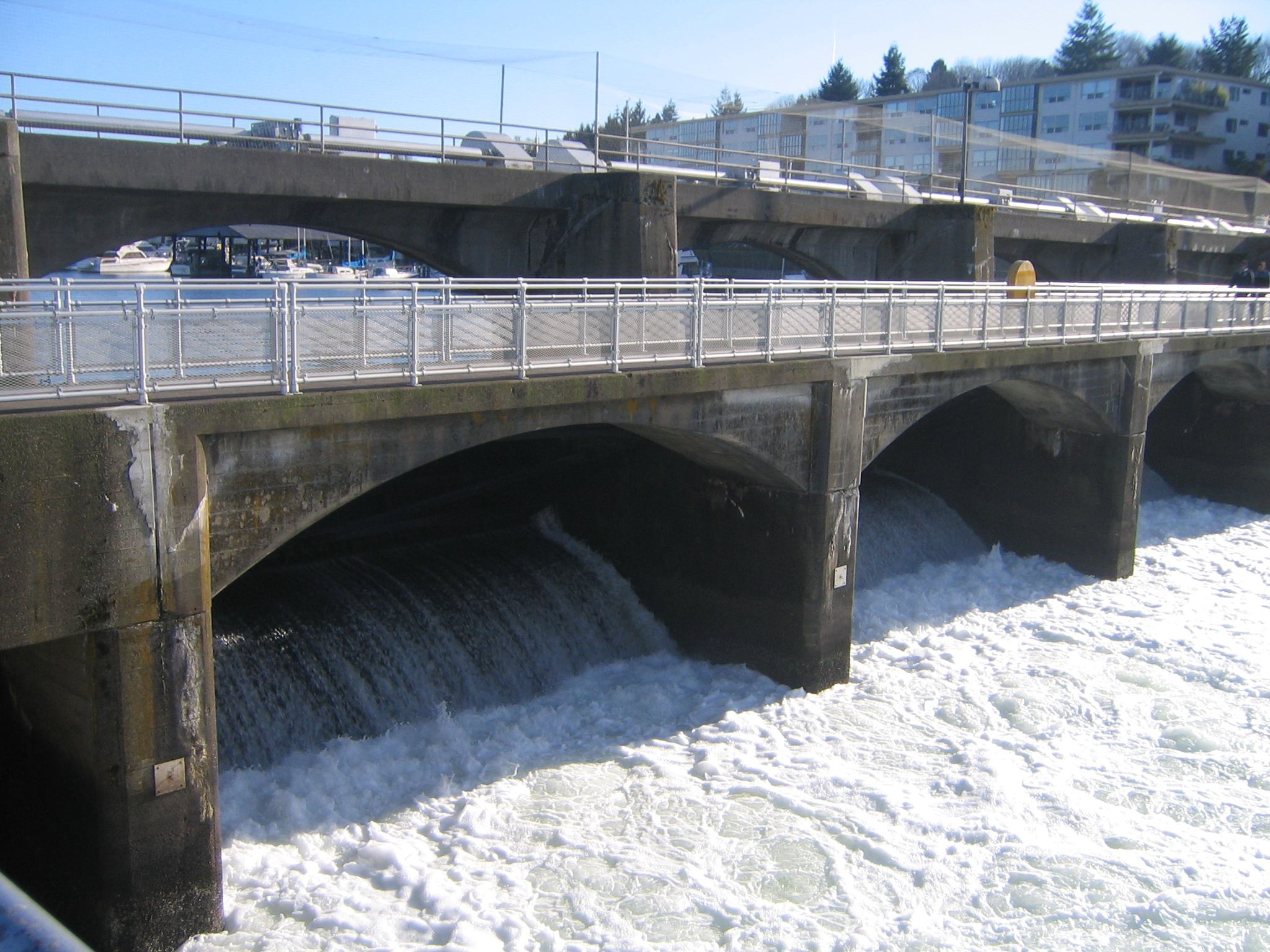
Spillway

South of the small lock is a spillway dam with tainter gates used to regulate the freshwater levels of the ship canal and lakes. The gates on the dam release or store water to maintain the lake within a 2 ft (0.61 m) range of 20 to 22 ft (6.1 to 6.7 m) above sea level. Maintaining this lake level is necessary for floating bridges, mooring facilities, and vessel clearances under bridges.

"Smolt flumes" in the spillway help young salmon to pass safely downstream. Higher water levels are maintained in the summer to accommodate recreation as well as to allow the lakes to act as a water storage basin in anticipation of drought conditions.

== Salt water barrier ==
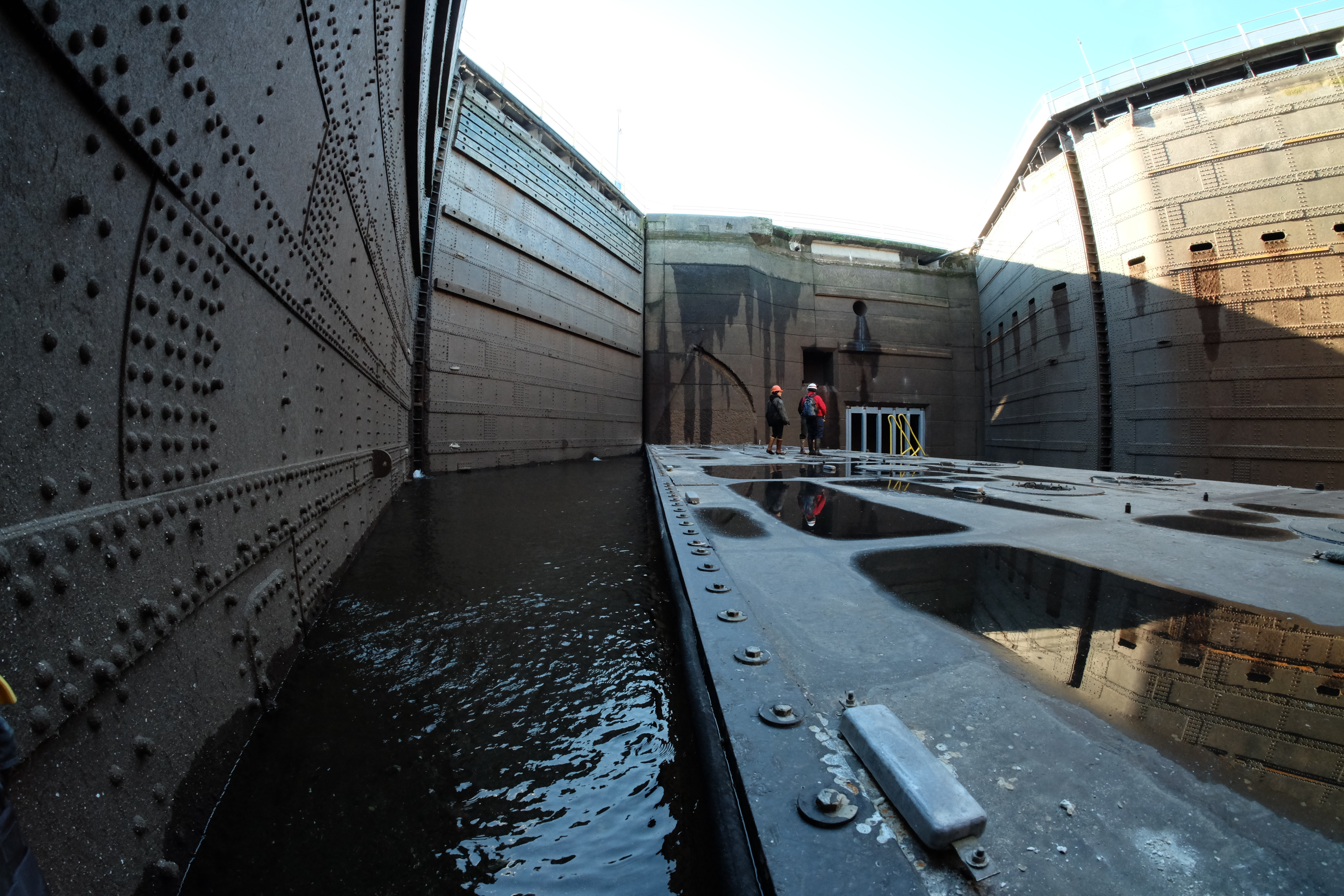
The salt water barrier during annual maintenance, with water pumped out of the large lock.

If excessive salt water were allowed to migrate into Salmon Bay, the salt could eventually damage the freshwater ecosystem. To prevent this, a basin was dredged just above (east of) the large lock. The heavier salt water settles into the basin and drains through a pipe discharging downstream of the locks area. In 1975, the saltwater drain was modified to divert some salt water from the basin to the fish ladder, where it is added via a diffuser to the fish ladder attraction water; see below.

To further restrict saltwater intrusion, in 1966, a hinged barrier was installed just upstream of the large lock. This hollow metal barrier is filled with air to remain in the upright position, blocking the heavier salt water. When necessary to accommodate deep-draft vessels, the barrier is flooded and sinks to the bottom of the chamber.

== Fish ladder ==
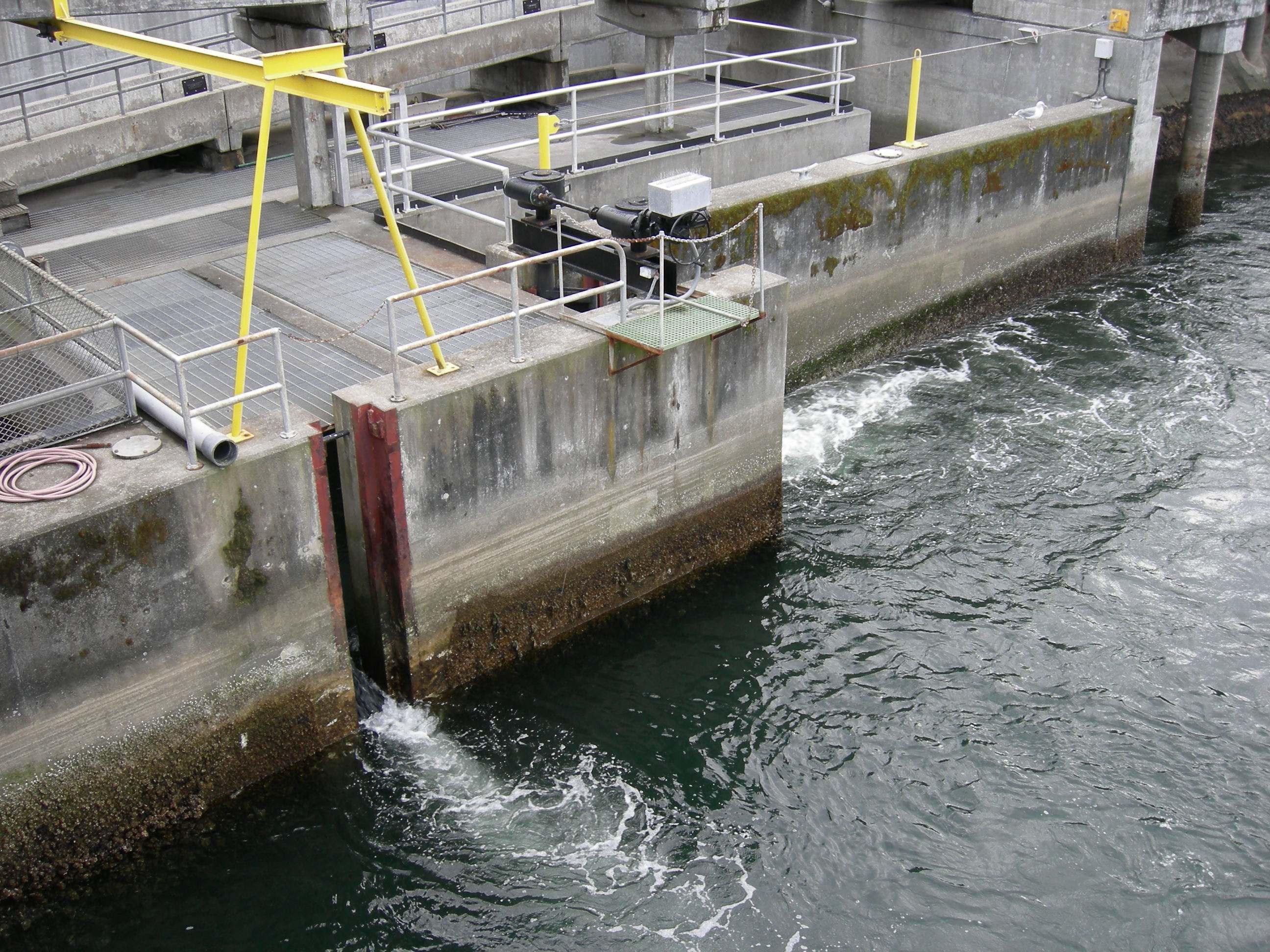
Attraction water is visible in two places in this photo; the lower part of the fish ladder snakes around the diffuser well.

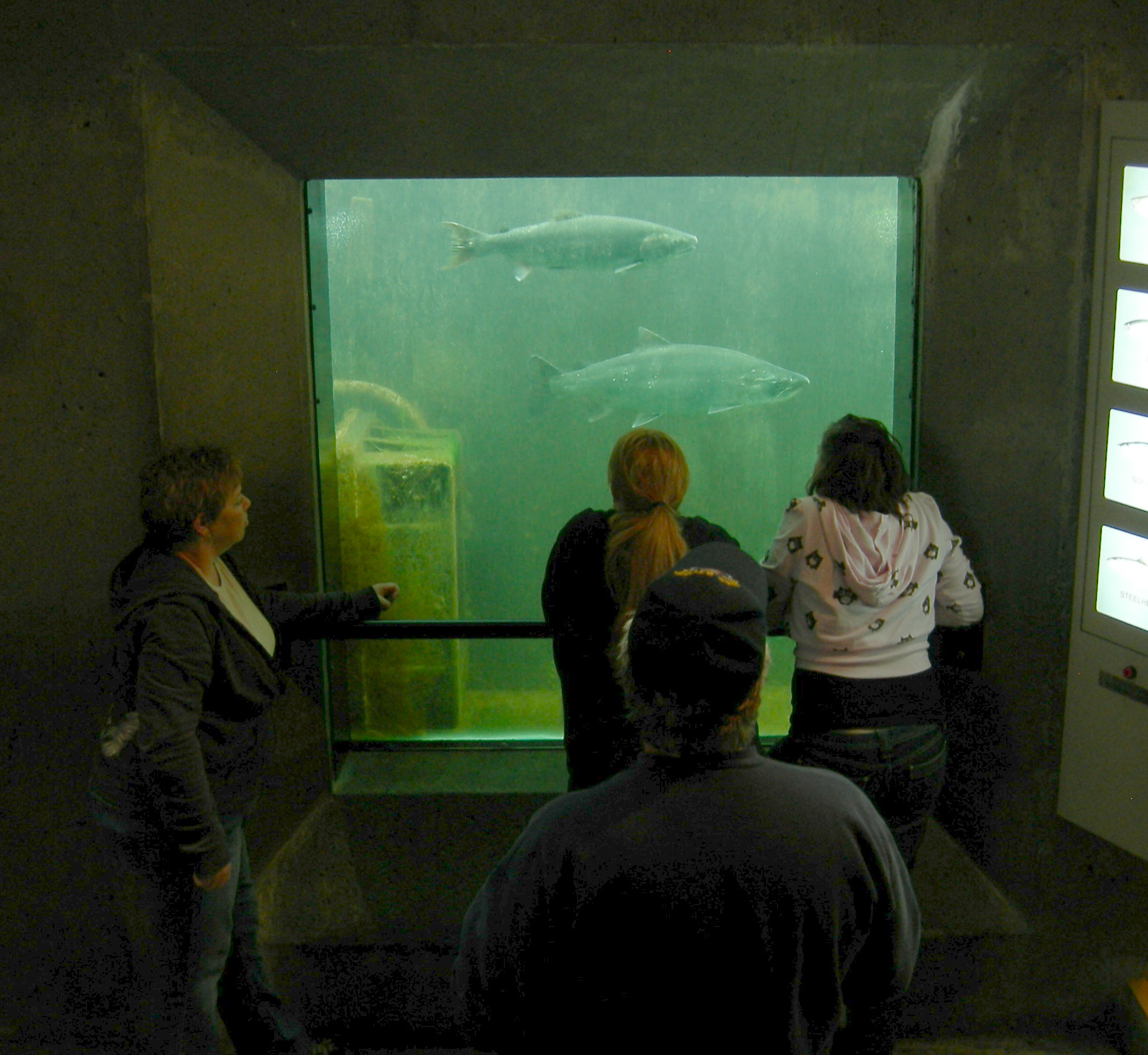
Fish ladder viewing room.

The fish ladder at the Chittenden locks is unusual—materials published by the federal government say "unique"—in being located where salt and fresh water meet. Normally, fish ladders are located entirely within fresh water.

Pacific salmon are anadromous; they hatch in lakes, rivers, and streams—or, nowadays fish hatcheries—migrate to sea, and only at the end of their life return to fresh water to spawn. Prior to the Locks construction, no significant salmon runs existed here, as there was only a small drainage stream from Lake Union into Salmon Bay. In order to provide enough water to operate the Locks, Cedar River was rerouted into Lake Washington (which was lowered 9 feet). Cedar River originally flowed into the Duwamish River along with the White River from the South. White River was rerouted into the Puyallup River. Cedar and White Rivers did support significant Salmon runs but also created severe flooding conditions for the early settlers. The rerouting of these two major rivers was a mixed blessing, while reducing flood threats, the Duwamish River salmon runs were decimated. To rectify this situation, salmon runs were rerouted through the Locks, which included introducing a major run of Sockeye Salmon using stock from Baker River, Washington.

The ladder was designed to use attraction water: fresh water flowing swiftly out the bottom of the fish ladder, in the direction opposite which anadromous fish migrate at the end of their lives. However, the attraction water from this first ladder was not effective. Instead, most salmon used the locks. This made them an easy target for predators like Herschel the sea lion; also, many were injured by hitting the walls and gates of the locks, or by hitting boat propellers.

The Corps rebuilt the fish ladder in 1976 by increasing the flow of attraction water and adding more weirs: most weirs are now one foot higher than the previous one. The old fish ladder had only 10 "steps"; the new one has 21. A diffuser well mixes salt water gradually into the last 10 weirs. As a part of the rebuilding, the Corps also added an underground chamber with a viewing gallery.

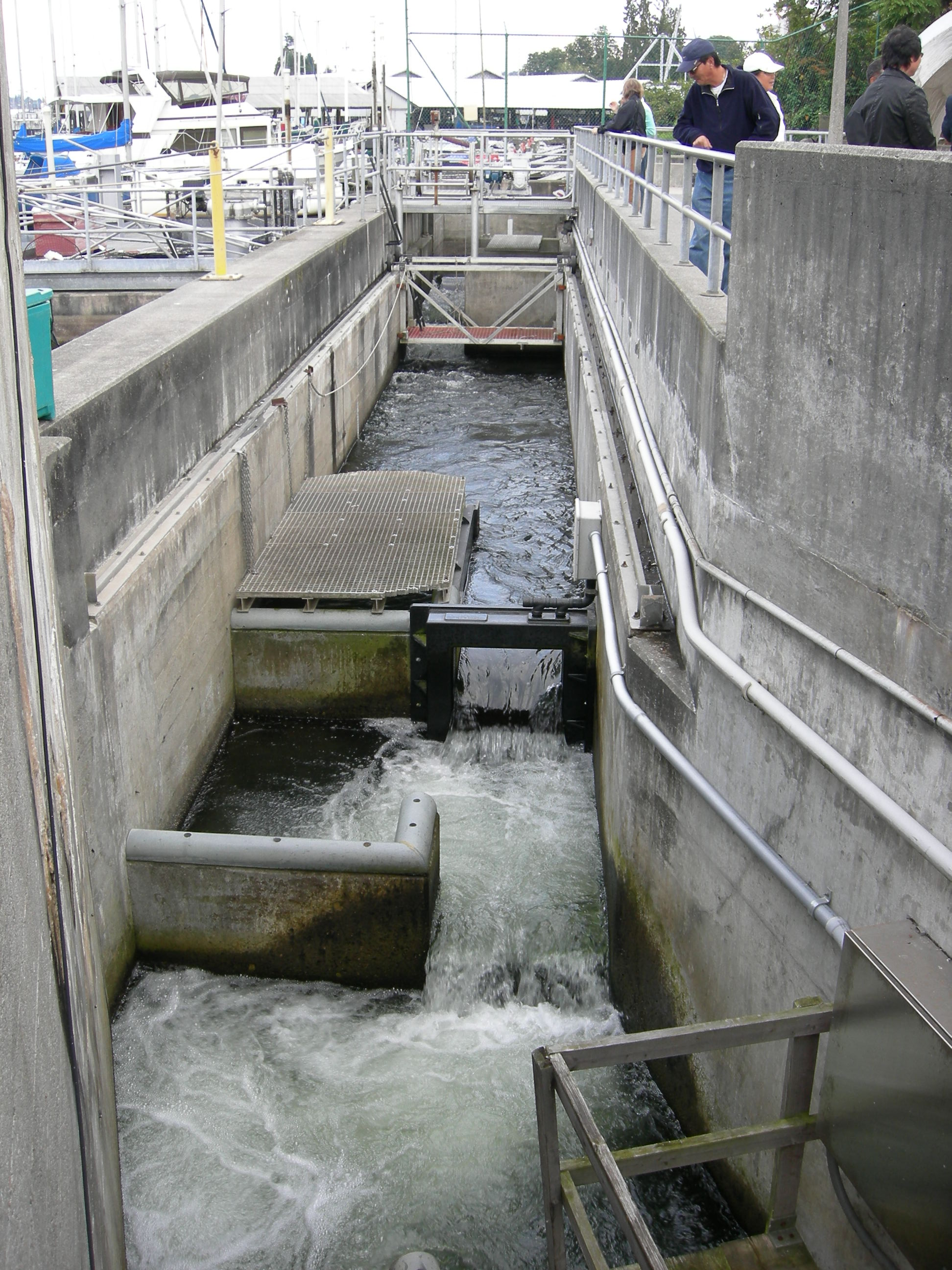
View from above of the part of the fish ladder over the viewing room.

The fish approaching the ladder smell the attraction water, recognizing the scent of Lake Washington and its tributaries. They enter the ladder, and either jump over each of the 21 weirs or swim though tunnel-like openings. They exit the ladder into the fresh water of Salmon Bay. They continue following the waterway to the lake, river, or stream where they were born. Once there, the females lay eggs, which the males fertilize. Most salmon die shortly after spawning.

The offspring remain in the fresh water until they are ready to migrate to the ocean as smolts. In a few years, the surviving adults return, climb the fish ladder, and reach their spawning ground to continue the life cycle. Of the millions of young fish born, only a relative few survive to adulthood. Causes of death include natural predators, commercial and sport fishing, disease, low stream flows, poor water quality, flooding, and concentrated developments along streams and lakes.

Visitors to the locks can observe the salmon through windows as they progress along their route. Although the viewing area is open year-round, the "peak" viewing time is during spawning season, from about the beginning of July through mid-August. A public art work, commissioned by the Seattle Arts Commission, provides literary interpretation of the experience through recordings of Seattle poet Judith Roche's "Salmon Suite," a sequence of five poems tied to the annual migratory sequence of the fish.

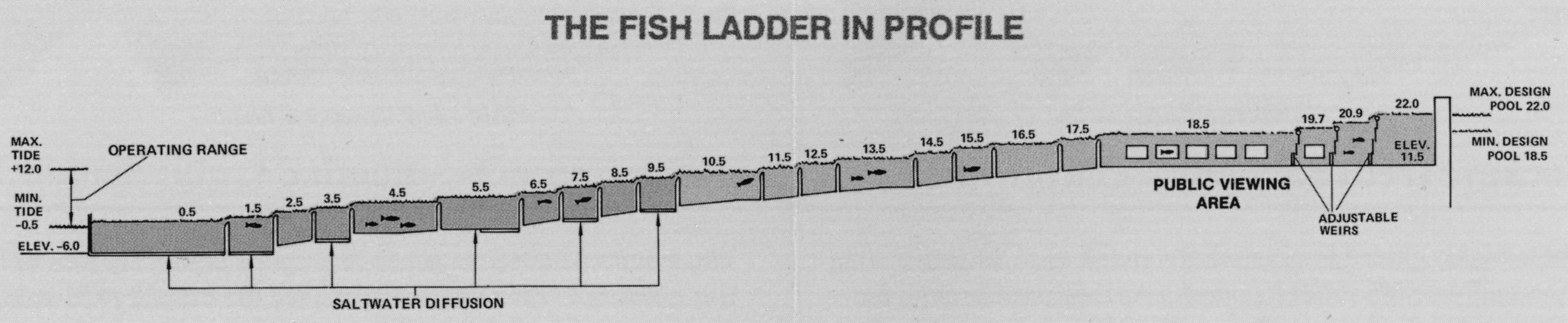
The fish ladder in profile. The actual fish ladder makes several right angle turns, which are not reflected in this diagram. The pamphlet shows the height of each weir. The last three weirs are adjustable to the level of Salmon Bay. Salt water is mixed with fresh water by the diffuser well in weirs indicated here by a darker gray. The longest weir in the ladder is for the viewing window.

=== Migratory fish ===
Among the species of salmonids migrating routinely through the ladder at the Chittenden Locks are Chinook (king) salmon (Oncorhynchus tshawytscha), Coho (silver) salmon (Oncorhynchus kisutch), Sockeye (red) salmon (Oncorhynchus nerka). Sockeye primarily migrate up the Cedar River to spawn and most end up at the Landsberg Dam Hatchery. Chinook and Coho migrate up the Issaquah Creek and most end up at the Issaquah Hatchery.

Steelhead (Oncorhynchus mykiss), once migrated through the Locks but none have been seen in years. The run is considered functionally extinct.

== Notes ==
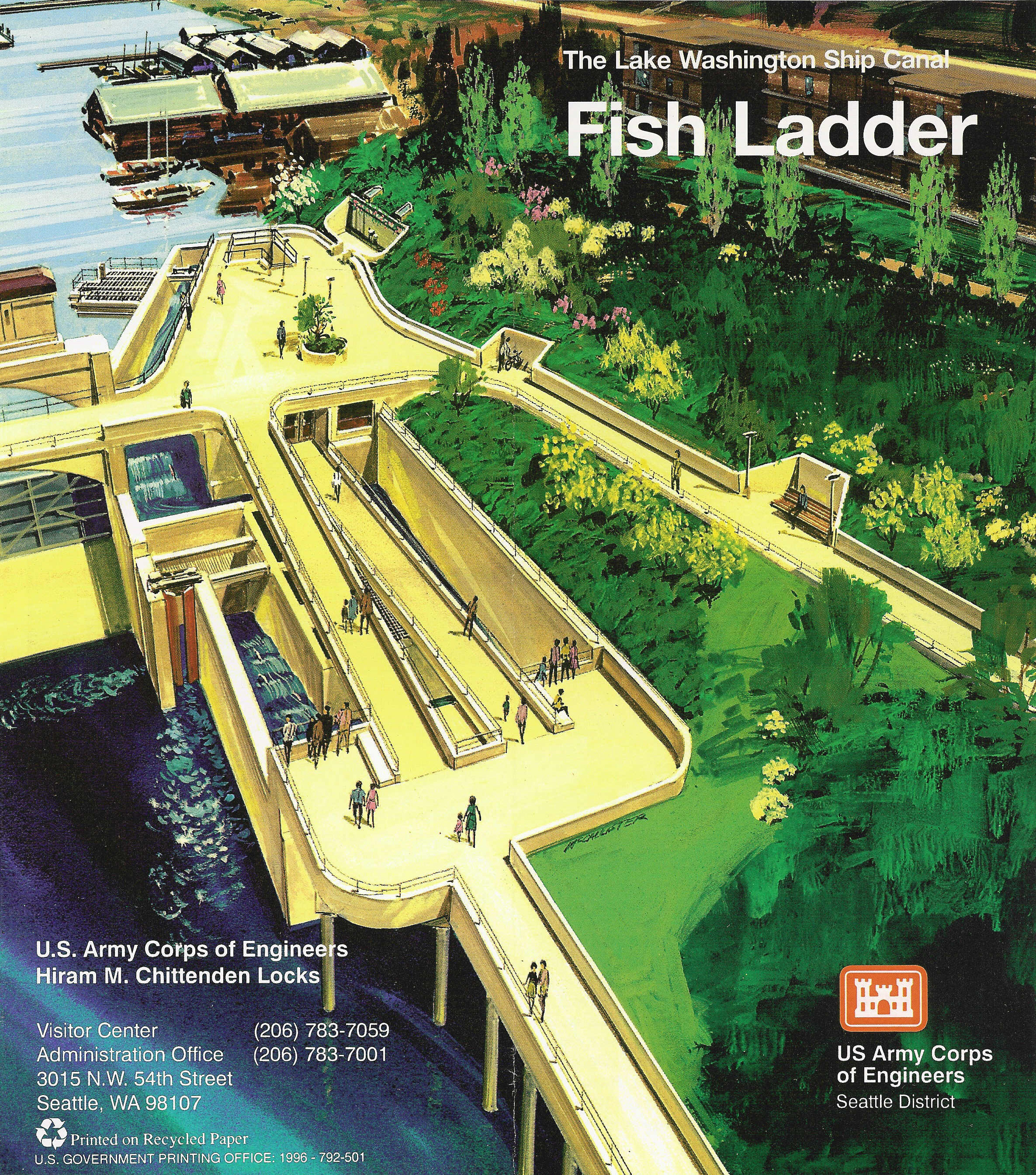
The cover of the US government pamphlet "Lake Washington Ship Canal Fish Ladder" depicts the fish ladder at the locks.
