= Boeing Model 2 =

Training floatplane family by Boeing

Model 2
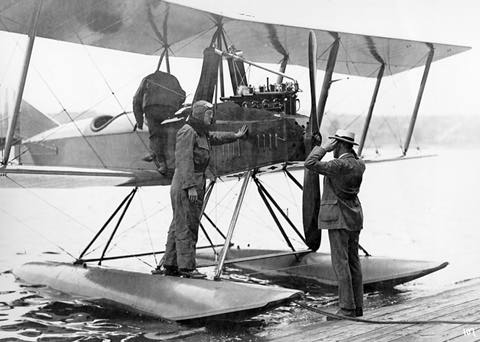
- Model 2 , construction number C-5

General information
- Type: Trainer
- Manufacturer: Boeing
- Designer: Wong Tsu; James Foley
- Primary users: U.S. Navy U.S. Army Air Service
- Number built: 56

History
- First flight: November 15, 1916
- Retired: 1918-1919

The Boeing Model 2, also referred to as the Boeing Model C, and its derivatives were United States two-place training seaplanes, the first "all-Boeing" design and the company's first financial success.

== Design and development ==
The Boeing Airplane Company, previously known as Pacific Aero Products Co., built the Model C naval trainer as its first mass-produced airplane. Early design work was started by George Conrad Westervelt in late 1915, with the first wind tunnel tests being conducted at the Massachusetts Institute of Technology's 4 ft (1.2 m) wind tunnel in May 1916. Most of the design work during early-to-mid 1916 by James Foley, who had previously assisted Westervelt in designing the Boeing Model 1. Westervelt, who had been reassigned to the East Coast in December 1915, consulted heavily on the design. Wong Tsu, an MIT graduate who was hired by Boeing in May 1916, also contributed to the design, specifically lending his expertise in the analysis of wind tunnel data. A total of 56 C-type trainers were built; 55 used twin pontoons. The Model C-1F had a single main pontoon and small auxiliary floats under each wing and was powered by a Curtiss OX-5 engine.

== Operational history ==
The success of the Model C led to Boeing's first military contract in April 1917 and prompted both its reincorporation as the Boeing Airplane Company and relocation from Lake Union, Washington to a former shipyard on the Duwamish River, also in Washington. The United States Navy bought 51 of the Model C trainers, including the C-1F, and the United States Army bought two landplane versions with side-by-side seating, designated the EA.

The final Model C was built for William Boeing and was called the C-700 (the last Navy plane had been Navy serial number 699). On March 3, 1919, Boeing and Eddie Hubbard flew the C-700 on the first international mail delivery, carrying 60 letters from Vancouver, British Columbia to Seattle, Washington.

== Variants ==
- Model 2 – original design (one built)
  - Model C-1F – Model 2 remanufactured with single pontoon
- Model 3 – version with revised cabane struts (three built)
- Model 4 – a.k.a. EA landplane version for US Army (two built)
- Model 5 – revised Model 3 for US Navy (50 built)
  - Model C-700 – Model 5 outfitted as mailplane

== Operators ==
United States

- United States Army Air Service
- United States Navy

== Specifications (Model 3) ==
Data from Boeing: History

General characteristics

- Crew: two
- Length: 27 ft 0 in (8.23 m)
- Wingspan: 43 ft 10 in (13.36 m)
- Height: 12 ft 7 in (3.84 m)
- Wing area: 495 sq ft (45.99 m^{2})
- Empty weight: 1,898 lb (861 kg)
- Gross weight: 2,395 lb (1,086 kg)
- Powerplant: 1 × Hall-Scott A-7A engine , 100 hp (74.6 kW)

Performance

- Maximum speed: 72.7 mph (117 km/h, 63.2 kn)
- Cruise speed: 65 mph (105 km/h, 56 kn)
- Range: 200 mi (322 km, 170 nmi)
- Service ceiling: 6,500 ft (1,981 m)
