= Wong Tsu =

Chinese engineer, First aeronautical engineer of Boeing

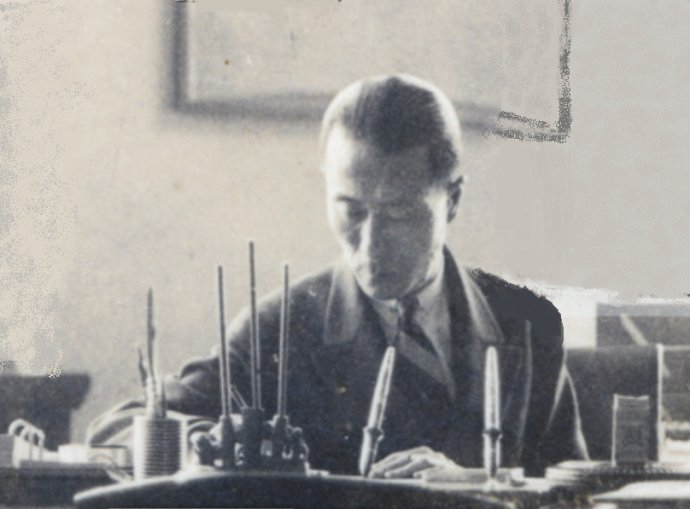
- Wong Tsu in his office at CAMCO, Hangzhou
- Born: 10 August 1893; Beijing, Qing China
- Died: 4 March 1965 (aged 71); Tainan, Taiwan
- Education: Massachusetts Institute of Technology
- Engineering career
- Employer: Boeing
- Awards: Acknowledged as first Boeing engineer at the Museum of Flight

Wong Tsu (also spelled Wong Tsoo, Chinese: 王助; pinyin: Wáng Zhù; 10 August 1893 – 4 March 1965) was a Chinese aeronautical engineer and the first aeronautical engineer at Boeing.

== Life and education ==
Wong was born in Beijing, Qing China. At the age of 12, he was selected as a naval cadet; at 16, he was sent to England to study naval engineering, then to the United States to study aeronautical engineering at the Massachusetts Institute of Technology (MIT) during the period of great social and political upheaval in China. In England it appears he enrolled at Armstrong College of Durham University, now the University of Newcastle. There is a record of him matriculating at Durham University in 1912.

== Work ==
Wong graduated from MIT with a degree in aeronautical engineering in 1916. He then learned to fly at the Curtiss Flying Boat School in Buffalo, New York. In May 1916, the fledgling Boeing Airplane Company hired Wong as their first trained aeronautical engineer. He helped design the company's first successful product, the Boeing Model C, more than 50 of which the U.S. Navy purchased. In light of the financial windfall brought from the Navy purchases, "from Bill Boeing onward, the company's chief executives through the decades were careful to note that without Wong Tsu's efforts, especially with the Model C, the company might not have survived the early years to become the dominant world aircraft manufacturer."

Wong brought considerable expertise in wind tunnel testing to Boeing, and advised on the design of the Boeing Aerodynamical Chamber at the University of Washington. In 1917, after around a year at Boeing, he returned to China. In 1928, he became chief secretary of the airline China National Aviation Corporation. From 1934 to 1937, he served as the chief engineer of the Central Aircraft Manufacturing Company, (CAMCO) a joint venture between China and Curtiss-Wright Corporation, Douglas Aviation, and Intercontinent Aviation.

When the Kuomintang government was defeated in the Chinese Civil War, Wong went to Taiwan where he became professor of aviation at National Cheng Kung University. He died on March 4, 1965, in Tainan at the age of 71.

During his lifetime, Wong designed more than two dozen aircraft. In 2004, Boeing unveiled a plaque and exhibit at the Museum of Flight in Seattle, Washington, honoring Wong's work as its first engineer.

== See also ==
- Air Warfare of WWII from the Sino-Japanese War perspective
- Aircraft of China both civil and military use from 1937 and before
