= Zee Yee Lee =

Chinese aviation pioneer

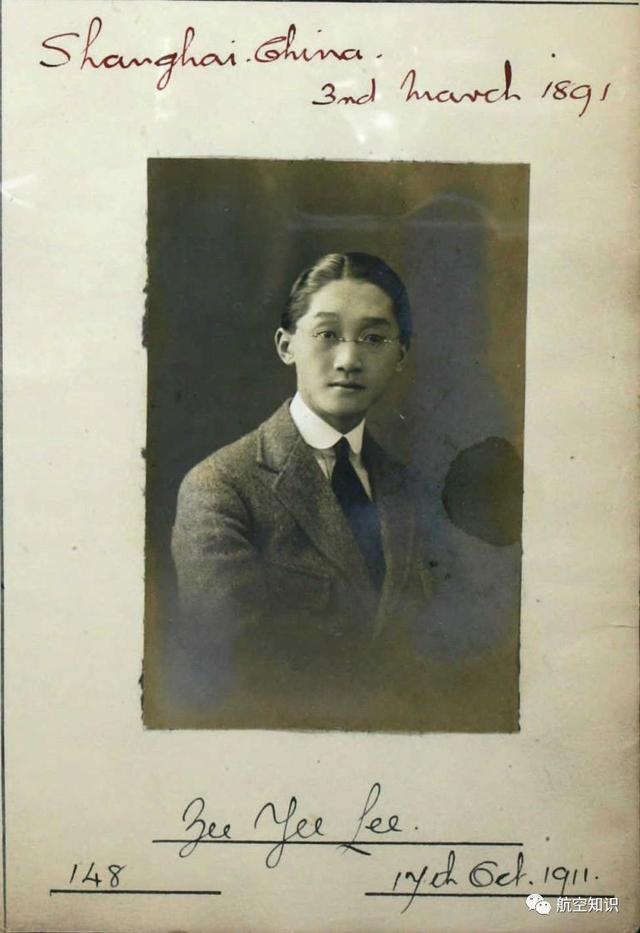
- Lee in 1911, when he was issued a Royal Aero Club certificate
- Traditional Chinese: 厲汝燕
- Simplified Chinese: 厉汝燕
Transcriptions
Standard Mandarin
- Hanyu Pinyin: Lì Rǔyàn
- Wade–Giles: Li^{4} Ju^{3}-yen^{4}
Wu
- Romanization: Li Zy-yi

Zee Yee Lee (Chinese: 厲汝燕; pinyin: Lì Rǔyàn; Wade–Giles: Li^{4} Ju^{3}-yen^{4}; 1891–1944) was a Chinese aviation pioneer. After becoming the first Chinese pilot to earn a Royal Aero Club certificate in October 1911, he brought two Etrich Taube monoplanes to China and flew on over Shanghai in April 1912. He was by some accounts China's first aviator, and was also one of the first Chinese aircraft designers. He served as the chief instructor and head of the Nanyuan Aviation School in Beijing for 15 years, and later taught at the predecessor of the Republic of China Air Force Academy.

== Biography ==
Lee was born in 1891 in Shanghai, Qing dynasty China, in his ancestral home in Dinghai, Zhejiang. His courtesy name was Yizhi (翼之). He studied in London, England, where he graduated from an industrial school in 1909. A year later, he entered the school of the newly established Bristol Aeroplane Company to study aviation and aircraft design. Howard Pixton was one of his flight instructors. On 17 October 1911, Lee flew a Bristol Boxkite on Salisbury Plain and passed the test to become the first Chinese aviator to earn a Royal Aero Club certificate (No. 148).

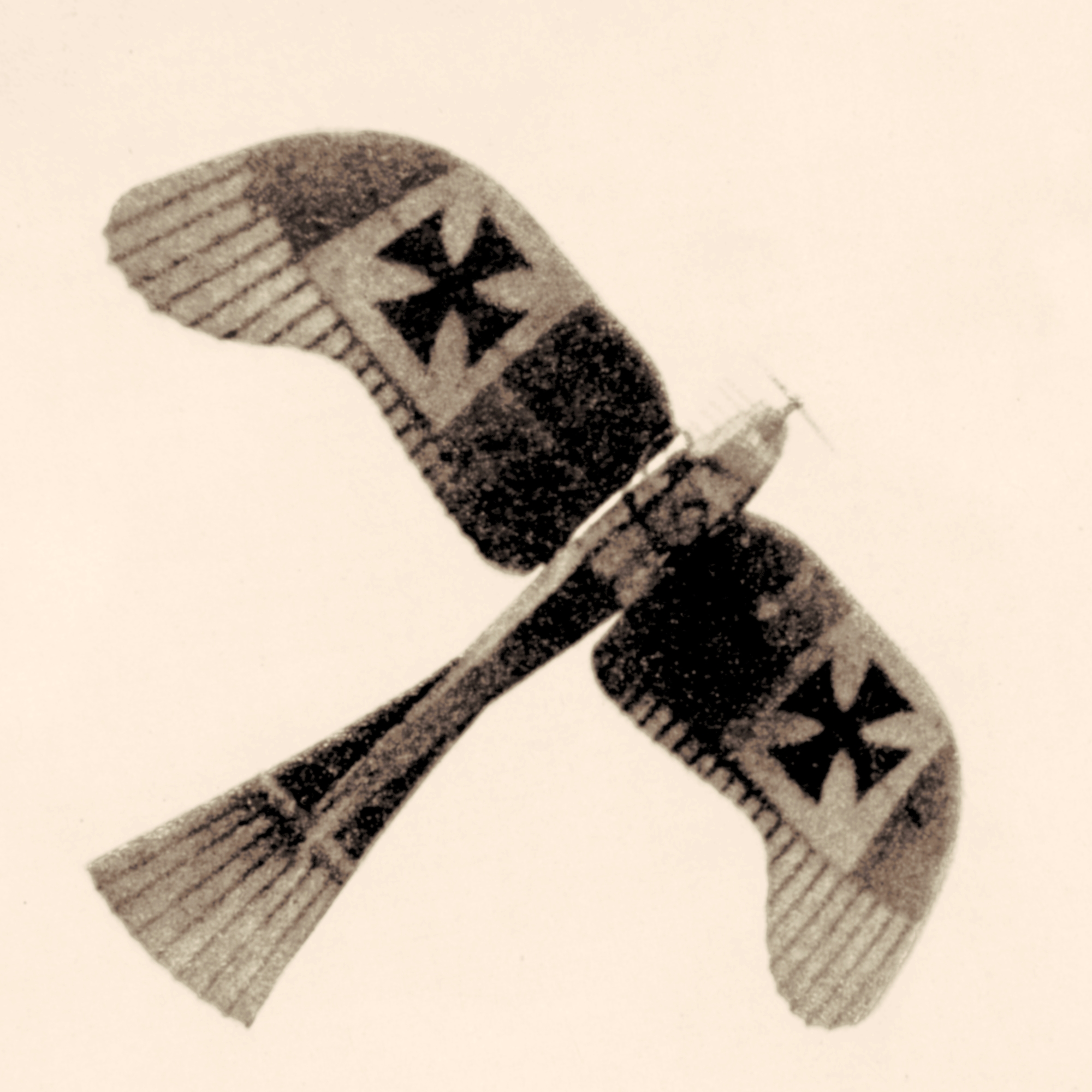
Lee brought two Etrich Taube monoplanes to China

Meanwhile, the Xinhai Revolution broke out in China and toppled the Qing dynasty. At the request of the provisional Republic of China government, Lee purchased two Etrich Taube monoplanes from Austria at the end of 1911 and brought them back to China. He was appointed the chief pilot of the Shanghai Military Government. On 13 and 14 April 1912, Lee flew a Taube over the Jiangwan Racecourse in Shanghai to celebrate the success of the Xinhai Revolution. According to Frank Dikötter and others, Lee was the first Chinese aviator, although Feng Ru, who had flown earlier in the United States, is also commonly credited as the first Chinese aviator.

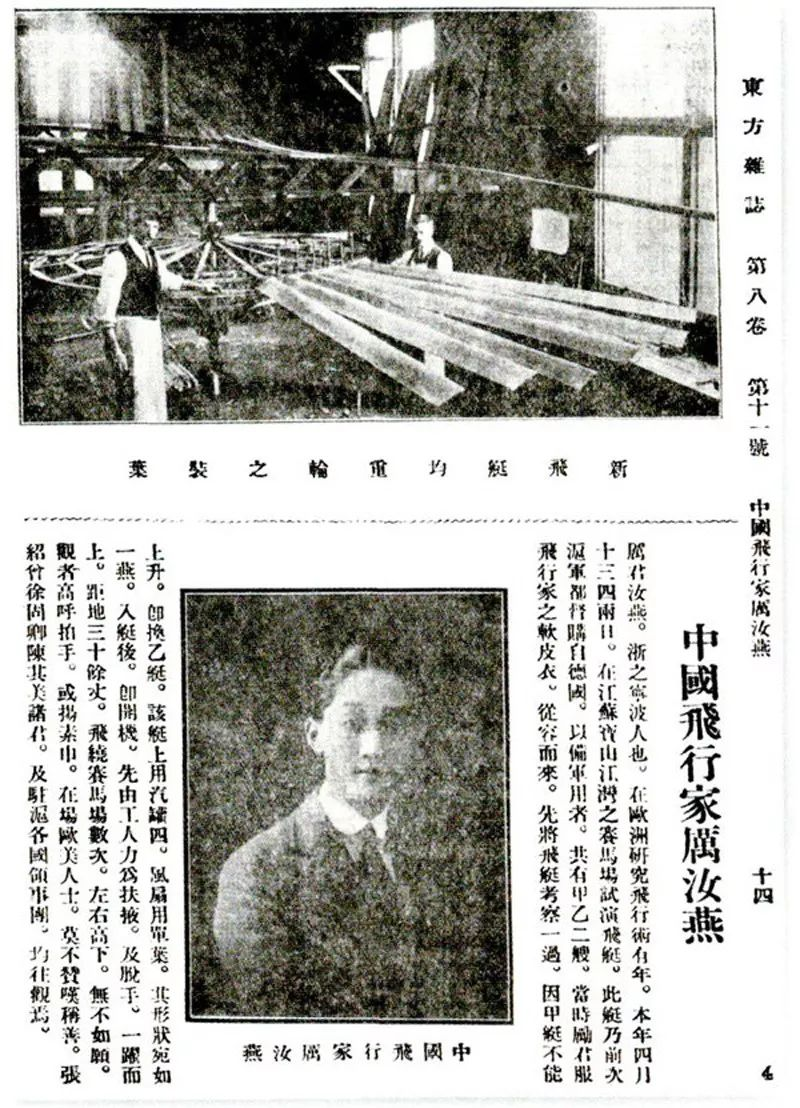
Lee on The Eastern Miscellany magazine, 1 May 1912

Lee enlisted in the newly established flying battalion of the Republic of China Army in Nanjing. In March 1913, President Yuan Shikai moved the battalion to Nanyuan Airport in Beijing, and Lee was appointed chief flight instructor as well as head of maintenance. In September 1913, he became the chief instructor of the Nanyuan Aviation School; he was promoted to head of the school five years later. On 10 and 11 March 1914, Lee and two other pilots flew between Beijing and Baoding, establishing China's first airline route. He was also instrumental in establishing the first aerial mail passenger service between Beijing and Tianjin, which was inaugurated on 7 May 1920.

Because of sabotage by the troops of the Fengtian clique when they retreated from Beijing, the Nanyuan Aviation School was closed in 1928. Lee moved south to serve the Kuomintang government, and was appointed deputy director of the Aviation Corps of the Central Military Academy, which later became the Republic of China Air Force Academy in Jianqiao, Hangzhou. He also designed a floatplane and became one of China's first aircraft designers. He published at least two books on aviation.

Lee left the aviation industry after the 1930s. He died in 1944.

== See also ==
- Zhu Binhou
- Kwon Ki-ok
