= Roger Poupon =

WW1 French flying ace

- Born: 1 December 1888; Clermont-Ferrand, France
- Died: September 22, 1976 (aged 87); Monte Carlo, Monaco
- Military career
- Allegiance: France
- Branch: Aviation
- Rank: Capitaine (later Colonel)
- Unit: Escadrille 37
- Commands: Escadrille 37
- Awards: Legion d'Honneur; Croix de Guerre; Mentioned in dispatches six times

Capitaine (later Colonel) Roger Poupon was a French World War I flying ace credited with eight aerial victories.

== Biography ==
See also Aerial victory standards of World War I

Roger Poupon was born in Clermont-Ferrand, France on 1 December 1888.

Poupon performed his required military service as an enlisted cavalryman from 1 October 1909 to 24 September 1911, then was passed to the reserves. On 1 August 1914, as part of the French mobilization for World War I, he was recalled to active duty. By 13 October 1914, he had been commissioned as a temporary Sous lieutenant. He was confirmed in this rank on 5 January 1916.

On 6 November 1916, he was forwarded for pilot's training. On 26 January 1917, he graduated with his Military Pilot's Brevet. After advanced instruction, he was posted to a combat unit, Escadrille N.37, on 11 April 1917. He would help shoot down a German observation balloon and an enemy airplane in March 1918. On 18 June 1918, he assumed command of the escadrille.

He would share six more victories with his wingmates, who included such fellow aces as Bernard Barny de Romanet and Fernand Guyou. On 3 October 1918, he was promoted to Capitaine. By war's end, he had earned the Legion d'honneur, the Croix de Guerre with five palmes, two etoiles de vermeil, two etoiles de argent, and an etoile de bronze. He had also been Mentioned in dispatches six times.

By 12 September 1976, when he died in Monte Carlo, Monaco, he had reached the rank of Colonel.
