= Fernand Guyou =

WW1 French flying ace

Fernand Eugene Guyou
- Born: 7 January 1891; Champigny-sur-Marne
- Died: 1 September 1944 (aged 53); Morocco
- Military career
- Allegiance: France
- Branch: Aviation
- Rank: Sous lieutenant
- Units: Escadrille 49, Escadrille 15, Escadrille 395, Escadrille 351, Escadrille 463, Escadrille 93
- Awards: Légion d'honneur, Médaille militaire, Croix de Guerre with seven palms and a star

Sous Lieutenant Fernand Eugene Guyou was a World War I flying ace credited with twelve aerial victories.

== Early life ==
Fernand Eugene Guyou was born in Champigny-sur-Marne, France on 7 January 1891.

== World War I service ==
=== Infantry service ===
Guyou was serving as an enlisted Brigadier in the cavalry reserves when war began. On 3 September 1914, he was assigned the duties of mounted scout for the 46eme Régiment d'Infanterie. On 12 October, he was promoted to Maréchal-des-logis. On 12 April 1915, he was transferred to 8eme Régiment de Chasseurs. On 20 December 1915, he was sent for pilot's training. He earned Military Pilot's Brevet No. 2697, awarded on 17 February 1916.

=== Flying service ===
His initial flying assignment on 26 May 1916 was with Escadrille N49 (the 'N' signifying the squadron operated Nieuports). He moved on to Escadrille N15 on 12 August; on 23 September, he was severely wounded in action. Upon his recovery, he reported for reassignment on 20 December 1916. On 17 January 1917, he was sent to Escadrille N463. On 13 August, he was again sent for reposting; this time, he went to Escadrille N93 on the 25th. Here he found momentary success, cooperating with Gustave Daladier in shooting down a German two-seater reconnaissance plane on 30 October 1917. It would be seven more months before his second win, when he helped down an observation balloon on 30 May 1918. He would score twice more while with N93, and leave it when on the brink of acedom. With his new unit, Escadrille Spa37, he would use a Spad to tally eight more victories between 3 August 1918 and war's end, sharing them with fellow aces Bernard Barny de Romanet, Roger Poupon, and Georges Lienhart By the armistice, Guyou had logged over 431 hours flight time.

=== Promotions and awards ===
On 25 January 1918, Guyou was promoted to Adjutant. On 6 April, he was awarded the Médaille militaire to accompany his Croix de Guerre. He received a temporary commission as a sous lieutenant on 1 June 1918. His career as an ace was capped with the receipt of the Légion d'honneur on 16 October 1918.

== Post World War I ==
Guyou flew as an airline pilot; he also flew for Potez. He rejoined the service for World War II, and died in Morocco on 1 September 1944.
