= Jianggan District =

Jianggan 江干区
- District
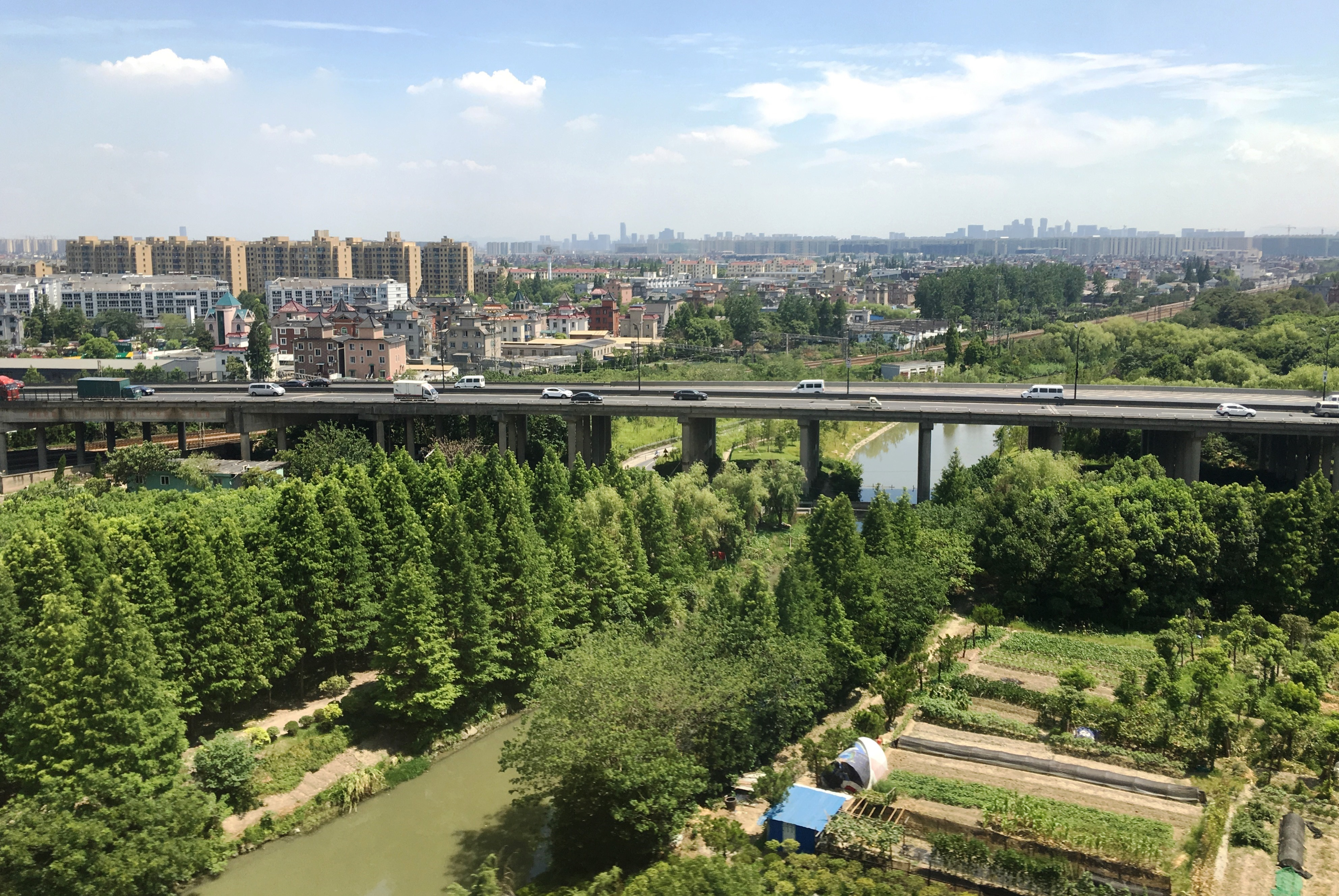

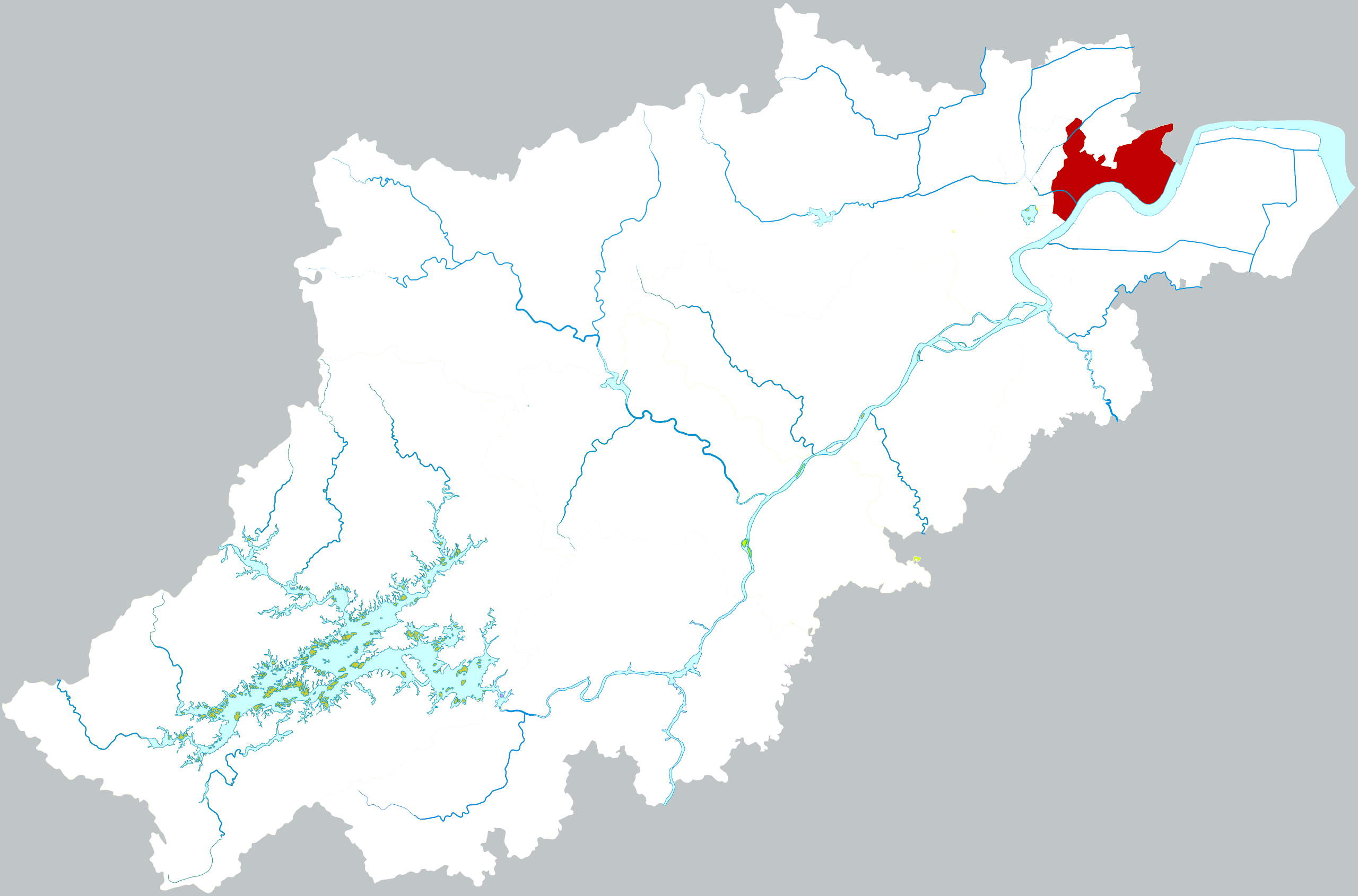
- Location of Jianggan District within Hangzhou

- Location in Zhejiang
- Coordinates: 30°15′03″N 120°12′03″E
- Country: People's Republic of China
- Province: Zhejiang
- Sub-provincial city: Hangzhou

Area
  - Total: 200.00 km^{2} (77.22 sq mi)
- Time zone: UTC+8 (China Standard)

Jianggan District
- Simplified Chinese: 江干区
- Traditional Chinese: 江干區
Transcriptions
Standard Mandarin
- Hanyu Pinyin: Jiānggàn Qū
Wu
- Romanization: (Hangzhou dialect)

Jianggan District was one of ten urban districts of the prefecture-level city of Hangzhou, the capital of Zhejiang Province, East China. The district was located in the northeast of Hangzhou and on the northern (left) bank of the Qiantang River.

Hangzhou Jianqiao Airport is located in Jianqiao, Jianggan. Zhejiang Airlines once had its headquarters there.

In April 2021, Jianggan District was split between Qiantang District and Shangcheng District.

== Administrative divisions ==
Subdistricts:

- Kaixuan Subdistrict (凯旋街道), Caihe Subdistrict (采荷街道), Zhanongkou Subdistrict (闸弄口街道), Sijiqing Subdistrict (四季青街道), Baiyang Subdistrict (白杨街道), Xiasha Subdistrict (下沙街道)

Towns:

- Jiubao (九堡镇), Pengbu (彭埠镇), Dingqiao (丁桥镇), Jianqiao (笕桥镇)
