= CJG =

CJG may refer to:

- Charles Julius Guiteau (1841-1882), American who assassinated US President James A. Garfield in 1881
- Charles Jasper Glidden (1857–1927), American telephone pioneer
- CJG (airline), a defunct airline of the People's Republic of China
