= Escadrille SPA.37 =

Escadrille MS 37 - N 37 - SPA 37
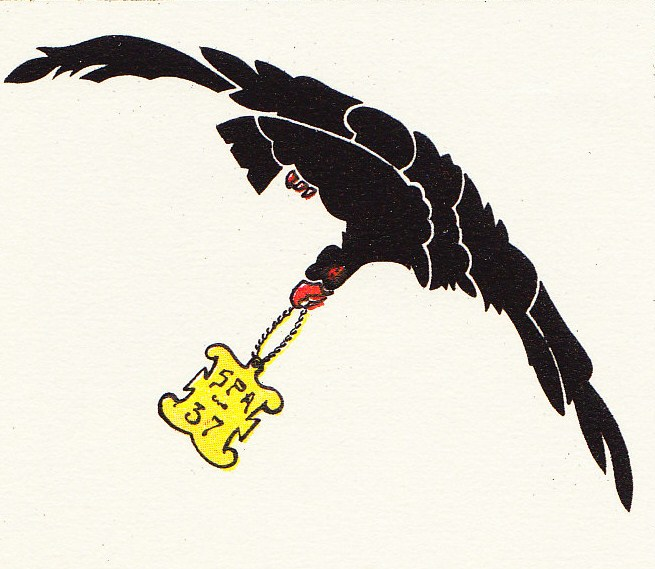
- Squadron Insignia of Escadrille SPA 37
- Active: 1915
- Country: France
- Branch: French Air Service
- Type: Fighter Squadron
- Engagements: World War I

Escadrille 37 of the French Air Force was established at Chateauford, France in January 1915. Its original equipment of Morane-Saulniers led to its original designation of Escadrille MS 37.

== History ==
Initially, Escadrille MS 37 was posted to support II Armee of the French Army. During July, it began the transition to Nieuport two-seaters which would lead to its being redubbed Escadrille N 37 on 20 September 1915. In Spring 1916, the escadrille converted to Nieuport 11s. On 2 July 1916, the unit was forwarded to support VI Armee. The ad hoc Groupement de Chasse de Cachy was there with its four assigned Escadrilles; N 37 and two other escadrilles were temporarily attached to the groupement.

In January 1917, Escadrille N.37 transferred to III Armee. In early March, it moved to IV Armee. At the same time, it began to rearm with SPADs; this would lead to its later redesignation as Escadrille SPA 37. In March, it was incorporated into alarger unit, Groupe de Combat 15. In July, Escadrille 37 was again posted to II Armee. In September, it returned briefly to IV Armee before once again being assigned to II Armee later in 1917.

As part of GC 15, Escadrille 37 joined in the groupe missions as it returned to support of IV Armee in mid-January 1918. The escadrille remained with GC 15 as the latter was incorporated into the larger Escadre de Combat No. 1 on 4 February 1918; subsequently that formation joined an even larger one, 1er Division Aerienne, on 14 May 1918.

On 4 October 1918, the Escadre and its constituent escadrilles were cited in orders. Escadrille SPA 37 was credited with 50 confirmed victories and 35 probables to date. Subsequent victories before war's end are unknown.

Escadrille 37 served in the French Air Force until disbandment on 29 June 2010.

== Commanding officers ==
- Capitaine Louis Quillien: January 1915 - KIA 3 April 1916
- Lieutenant Marcel Feierstein: 4 April 1916 - 19 December 1917
- Capitaine Marcel Bonnevay: 20 December 1917 - 4 February 1918
- Lieutenant Paumier: 5 February 1918 - KIA 4 June 1918
- Lieutenant Roger Poupon: 5 June 1918 - ?

== Notable personnel ==
- Adolphe Pegoud
- Bernard Barny de Romanet
- Fernand Guyou
- Roger Poupon
- Georges Lienhart
- Etienne Tsu

== Aircraft inventory ==
- Morane-Saulnier two-seaters: January 1915
- Nieuport two-seaters: From July 1915
- Nieuport 11: Spring 1916
- SPAD: From March 1917
