= Dingqiao =

Dingqiao (丁桥镇) may refer to the following towns in China:

- Dingqiao, Anhui, in Qingyang County
- Dingqiao, Haining, Zhejiang
- Dingqiao, Hangzhou, in Jianggan District
