= 14th Golden Horse Awards =

1977 Taiwanese film awards ceremony

- Date: October 30, 1977
- Site: Zhongshan Hall, Taipei, Taiwan
- Hosted by: Hsu Ching-chung
- Organized by: Taipei Golden Horse Film Festival Executive Committee

Highlights
- Best Feature Film: Heroes of the Eastern Skies
- Best Director: Chang Tseng-tse; Heroes of the Eastern Skies
- Best Actor: Charlie Chin; Far Away from Home
- Best Actress: Chelsia Chan; Chelsia My Love
- Most awards: Heroes of the Eastern Skies (6)

The 14th Golden Horse Awards (Mandarin:第14屆金馬獎) took place on October 30, 1977, at Zhongshan Hall in Taipei, Taiwan.

== Winners and nominees ==
Winners are listed first, highlighted in boldface.

**Best Feature Film**: **Heroes of the Eastern Skies**; Far Away From Home (runner-up); Chelsia My Love (runner-up); The Adventures of Emperor Chien Lung (runner-up); The Chasing Game (runner-up); Dynasty (runner-up)	**Best Documentary**: **Qing Zhu Liu Shi Wu Nian Guo Qing Huo Dong**; Qing Zhu Zhong Hua Min Guo Liu Shi Wu Nian Guo Qing (runner-up); Tai Wan Yu Da Lu Di Xue Yuan (runner-up); Wu Yu Lai De Shi Hou (runner-up); Yu (runner-up)
**Best Animation**: **Wei Yu Chou Mou**	**Best Director**: **Chang Tseng-tse — Heroes of the Eastern Skies**
**Best Leading Actor**: **Charlie Chin — Far Away from Home**	**Best Leading Actress**: **Chelsia Chan — Chelsia My Love**
**Best Supporting Actor**: **Bai Ying — Dynasty**	**Best Supporting Actress**: **Terry Hu — Far Away from Home**
**Best Child Star**: **Wu Yu-kang — Shining Spring**	**Best Screenplay**: **Ho Hsiao-chung — Heroes of the Eastern Skies**
**Best Cinematography - Color**: **Lin Hung-chung — Heroes of the Eastern Skies**	**Best Film Editing**: **Wang Chi-yang — Heroes of the Eastern Skies**
**Best Art Direction - Color**: **Chen Ching-shen — The Adventures of Emperor Chien Lung**	**Best Music**: **Joseph Koo — Chelsia My Love**
**Best Sound Recording**: **Hsin Chiang-sheng — Heroes of the Eastern Skies**	**Best Cinematography for Documentary**: **Chen Yu-pu - Qing Zhu Liu Shi Wu Nian Guo Qing Huo Dong**
**Best Planning for Documentary**: **Tuan Mu-hsuan — Tai Wan Yu Da Lu Di Xue Yuan**	**Best Director for Animated Film**: **Huang Mu-tsun - Wei Yu Chou Mou**
**Special Award - Outstanding Performance**: **Ko Chun-hsiung - Love in the Shadow**
