= Civil aviation in China =

Industry and logistics operations

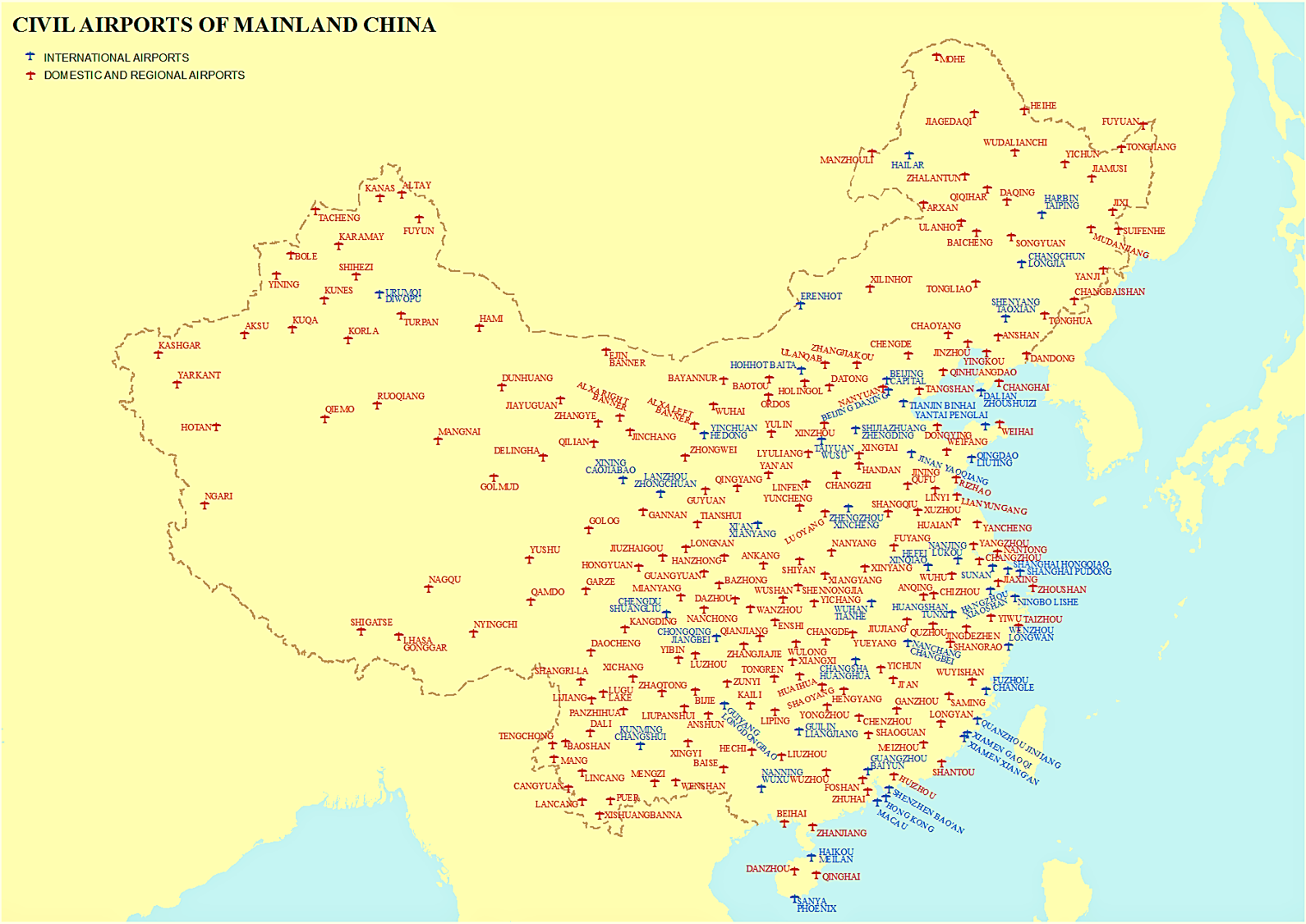
Civil airports in mainland China

As of December 2017, there are 229 commercial airports in China.

Around 500 airports of all types and sizes were in operation in 2007, about 400 of which had paved runways and about 100 of which had runways of 3,047 m or shorter. There also were 35 heliports in 2007, an increasingly used type of facility. With the additional airports came a proliferation of airlines.

China has the fastest growing passenger air market of any country in the world (by total passenger numbers) and between 2009 and 2014 the number of passengers increased over 47% from 266,293,020 to 390,878,784. In 2014 China was second only to the United States in total numbers of passengers carried.

== History ==
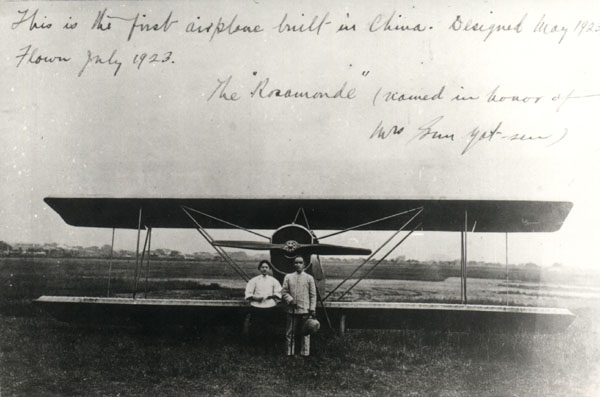
The Rosamonde biplane, the first indigenously designed and flown aircraft in China; Mme. Soong Qingling and Dr. Sun Yat-sen standing in front of the plane

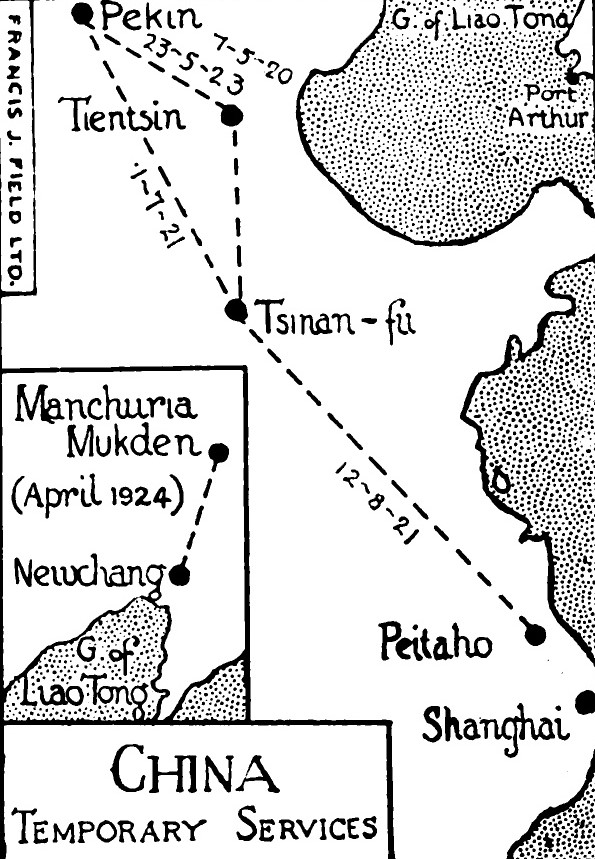
The air routes of China in 1925

The Nanyuan Airport first broke ground in Beijing near the end of the Qing Dynasty, and Chinese aviation pioneers Qin Guoyong and Li Ruyan, the principal and chief of the flight school operations established there in 1913 under then-president Yuan Shikai, had established the first airline service with a route between Beijing and Baoding in 1914. The Beijing Nanyuan Airport ceased civil aviation operations in 2019, after 109 years of service.

In 1922, warlord Cao Kun conducted a 3-day trial tour for "Beijing-Han Airlines" using a Handley Page aircraft (likely a HP O/400 bomber modified for passenger use). That March 31, the aircraft hit trees, crashed, and burned, on approach to Beijing-Nanyuan, killing all 14 on board. This was the first airliner crash in China.

In 1939 at Tsing Hua University a cadre of students constructed a wind tunnel with the help of Frank Wattendorf, a graduate of Harvard, MIT and Caltech. It was assigned to Tsing Hua Aeronautical Research Institute under the direction of Y. H. Ku.

Before the Chinese Civil War, there were Republic of China joint ventures with Pan American World Airways and Lufthansa. In 1946 Civil Air Transport (Air America) was founded by General Claire L. Chennault and Whiting Willauer for the relief of RoC. As a result of the Chinese Civil War, the Chinese Communist Party took control of mainland China, and only Civil Air Transport moved along with the Kuomintang (KMT)-controlled RoC government to Taiwan.

In 1949 the new government established the aviation authority and operator General Administration of Civil Aviation of China.

With assistance from the Soviet Union, during the 1950s China built airports in major cities or enlarged the existing airports.

The national air carriers of communist countries were the first to obtain landing rights in China. Pakistan's national air carrier was the first of any non-communist countries' national air carrier to do so. Those landing rights were granted in August 1963 when an air travel agreement followed the Sino-Pakistan Agreement.

Until the 1980s, generally only senior Chinese officials, academics, or foreigners could travel by plane. Few tickets were available and these had to be obtained from danwei rather than purchased at airports.

In 1987, China's government separated the airline operations of General Administration of Civil Aviation of China into a number of state-owned enterprises. The regulatory role was retained by the General Administration of Civil Aviation of China which is now known as Civil Aviation Administration of China.

In 2004, the turnover of airfreight reached 7.18 billion ton-km, the passenger turnover was 178.2 billion person-km, and the volume of freight traffic 2.767 million tons. China had a total of 1,279 civil flight routes, 1,035 of them domestic routes reaching all large and medium-sized cities, and 244 of them international, connecting China with more than 70 cities overseas.

China's passenger airline industry is dominated by the three state-owned airlines; Air China, China Southern Airlines and China Eastern Airlines. There are limited competition from private operators in the commercial passenger market such as Spring Airlines but the state owned operators have the political and financial wherewithal from the central government to lead the market.

== Statistics ==
=== Passenger throughput ===
In 2009, passenger throughputs of all nationwide airports reached 486.063 million, up by 19.8% over the last year; cargo and mail throughputs were 9.456 million tons, up by 7.0%.

In 2009, the number of airports with passenger throughput over 1 million person-trips was 51, an increase of 4 over the last year; and the number of airports with cargo and mail throughput that is over 10 thousand ton was 45, an increase of 1 over 2008. 51 airports had over 10 thousand takeoffs and landings annually, increased by 4 as compared with the last year. All the above indicated that China's airports had increasingly strong operation capability.

The International Civil Aviation Organization reported that between 2009 and 2017, the number of air passengers carried in China increased by 140% from 229,062,099 to 551,234,509.

== Industrial clusters ==
In China, Beijing, Xi'an, Chengdu, Shanghai, Shenyang and Nanchang are major research and manufacture centers of aerospace industry. China has developed extensive capability to design, test and produce military aircraft, missiles and space vehicles. However, despite the experimental model of Y-10, which was abolished in 1984, China is still developing its civil aerospace industry.

== Aerospace and aircraft ==
In 2007, China predicted that over the next twenty years its air transportation passenger volume will grow annually by 11%. It will become the world's second largest aviation market and will require an additional 1,790 aircraft to handle the increased volume. Expansion of airport infrastructure continues, with the Eleventh Five-Year Plan planning the construction of 49 new airports and 701 airport expansion projects. Furthermore, a new system of regional control centers and full conversion from program- to radar-based air traffic control will be introduced over the next 5–10 years.

The Civil Aviation Administration of China (CAAC) has been making efforts to nationalize the country's airlines. It has completed mergers with the "Big 3" (Air China, China Eastern and China Southern) and China's smaller, less profitable airlines. The CAAC is concentrating on expanding the number of smaller, single aisle aircraft while phasing out additional wide-body, twin aisle aircraft in the Chinese fleet. CAAC expects the new airlines to improve operating efficiencies and concentrate on developing a modern "hub-and-spoke" air routing system.

At present, CAAC is drafting the 11th Five-Year Plan and 2020 Vision for the aviation industry. It is expected that the annual growth rate will be 14%. By 2010, the total turnover will be 10 billion ton/km; the annual growth rate for general flight will be 10% and the total general flight volume will be 140,000 hours.

== Airports and ground equipment ==
Along with passenger airport equipment, large growth has been seen in the air cargo sector. New agreements have been signed to add cargo-carrying capacity to three Chinese airlines. With that capacity will come the need for better ground facilities to handle the additional cargo. China also plans to improve aviation security systems and equipment, computer information management, settlement ticketing systems, global distribution systems and e-commerce. Airport retail concessions are also a new concept for Chinese airport authorities. As airports are faced with the challenge of making money they are considering bringing in partners via food and other retail concessions. Finally, safety equipment - including emergency vehicles - continues to be an area of interest for Chinese airport authorities. Priority will be given to foreign investment, which will be directed toward airport infrastructure construction, technology upgrade and management training.

China is a fast-growing market for air traffic control equipment. Over the past 10 years, CAAC has spent approximately $1 billion on air traffic management (ATM) infrastructure improvements. By 2005, China had installed 31 primary radars, 52 secondary radars, more than 1,000 Very High Frequency (VHF) communications systems, over 160 Omnidirectional Range and Distance Measurement Systems (VOR/DMEs), and more than 140 Instrument Landing Systems (ILS) (see Distance measuring equipment). CAAC Air Traffic Management Bureau's (ATMB) goal over the next 5 years is to improve facilities in the eastern and mid-western sections of the country. The improvements call for a comprehensive data network, new automation-center systems, ground-air voice/data communications, and new en route radars.

China also plans to introduce ground-to-air communications and Automatic dependent surveillance – broadcast services for international and polar routes in the west. CAAC will reorganize the current airspace structure, reducing the total number of area control centers from 27 to 5 by 2010. In reorganizing the current structure, CAAC will construct two new regional control centers, in addition to the three remaining in Beijing, Shanghai, and Guangzhou.

== Air traffic control ==
China is a fast-growing ATC market. Over the past 10 years the CAAC has spent 10 billion yuan on ATM infrastructure improvements. The current (summer 2002) inventory comprises 31 radars, 52 secondary radars, more than 1,000 VHF communications systems, over 160 VOR/DMEs and more than 140 ILS units. The next target for the CAAC's Air Traffic Management Bureau is to improve facilities in the east and mid-west of the country. A comprehensive data network, new center-automation systems, ground-air voice/data communications and new en route radars will be required over the next 10 years.

China plans to introduce ground-air communications and automatic dependent surveillance services for international and polar routes in the west. The current airspace structure will be reorganized, reducing the 27 centers to five by 2010. Airspace environment in X'ian, Kunming, Chongqing and Wuhan will be improved, and over the next five years two new en route centers (in addition to Beijing, Shanghai and Guangzhou) will be built.

Flight delays are frequent in China, with 14 out of 20 airports with the worst on-time performance being in mainland China, Hong Kong, or Macau, according to airport statistics website FlightStats in 2015. This is because the airspace is mostly controlled by the military, and only less than 30% of China's airspace is available for commercial airlines. This has caused many businesspeople to use the high-speed rail instead.

== Domestic Competition ==
China's high-speed rail system is already increasing competition for the domestic passenger traffic.

== Manufacturers ==
- China National Aero-Technology Import & Export Corporation
- Changhe Aircraft Industries Corporation
- Chengdu Aircraft Industry Group
- ACAC consortium
- China Nanchang Aircraft Manufacturing Corporation
- Guizhou Aircraft Industry Co.
- Harbin Aircraft Manufacturing Corporation
- Hongdu Aviation Industry Corporation
- Shanghai Aviation Industrial Company
- Shaanxi Aircraft Company
- Shenyang Aircraft Corporation
- Xi'an Aircraft Industrial Corporation
- People's Liberation Army Air Force
- China Aerospace Science and Technology Corporation
- China Aviation Industry Corporation II (AVIC II)
- Commission of Science, Technology and Industry for National Defense
- China Northern Industries

== See also ==
- Air route authority between the U.S. and China
- Lunar New Year cross-strait charter
- People's Liberation Army Air Force (PLAAF)
- China International Aviation & Aerospace Exhibition
- List of Chinese aircraft
- List of Chinese aircraft engines
- Aircraft acquired by Chinese for civil/private and military/warlord use from before 1937
- List of airline holding companies
