= Zhu Binhou =

Early Chinese aviator

- 朱斌侯
- Born: 4 December 1885; Shanghai, Qing dynasty
- Died: 1940 (unconfirmed)
- Relatives: Zhu Zhiyao (father)
- Military career
- Allegiance: France
- Branch: French Air Force
- Service years: 1914–1919
- Unit: Escadrille SPA.37
- Conflicts: World War I

Zhu Binhou (Chinese: 朱斌侯; pinyin: Zhū Bīnhóu; Wade–Giles: Chu Pin-hou; 4 December 1885 – 1940?), also known as Etienne Tsu, was an early Chinese aviator. Born in Shanghai, Zhu was a son of the prominent banker Zhu Zhiyao (朱志尧, a.k.a. Nicolas Tsu). He left for France to study mechanical engineering at the Université Lille 1, graduating in 1903. As he was fascinated with the design and operation of automobiles and ships, 1903 also brought about the revolutionary advent of the controlled, sustained, and powered heavier-than-air machines, which had driven Zhu Binhou into this new frontier of human flight.

Zhu Binhou gained his aviator's license, issued by the Aero Club de France, in 1914 at the beginning of World War I, and joined, as part of the French Foreign Legion, Escadrille SPA.37 of the French Air Service in 1915; he is credited with downing five German aircraft and observation balloons, and four probables between 10 July 1916 and 7 January 1917.

Demobilized in 1919, he returned to China where he took part in the creation of the Chinese Flying school which was equipped with French machines. A Colonel in 1925, he died in Shanghai in 1940.

== See also ==
- Feng Ru
- Li Ruyan
- Jianqiao air base
- Civil and military/warlord aircraft in China pre-1937
- Air battles of the War of Resistance/WWII 1937-45
- Development of the Nationalist Air Force of China; the combined effort of overseas Chinese volunteer pilots and former warlord air force units joining the central authority of the Republic of China Air Force for the War of Resistance/World War II against the Imperial Japanese invasion from 1937 to 1945

== Bibliography ==
- Comas, Mathieu (September 1997). "14/18: Etienne Tsu: un chinois sous les cockades" [A Chinese Under the Colors]. Avions: Toute l'aéronautique et son histoire (in French) (54): 33–35. ISSN 1243-8650.
