= Battle of Jianqiao =

1937 air battle fought between Chinese and Japanese air forces

Coordinates: 30.3319°N 120.2363°E

- Part of the Second Sino-Japanese War and the interwar period
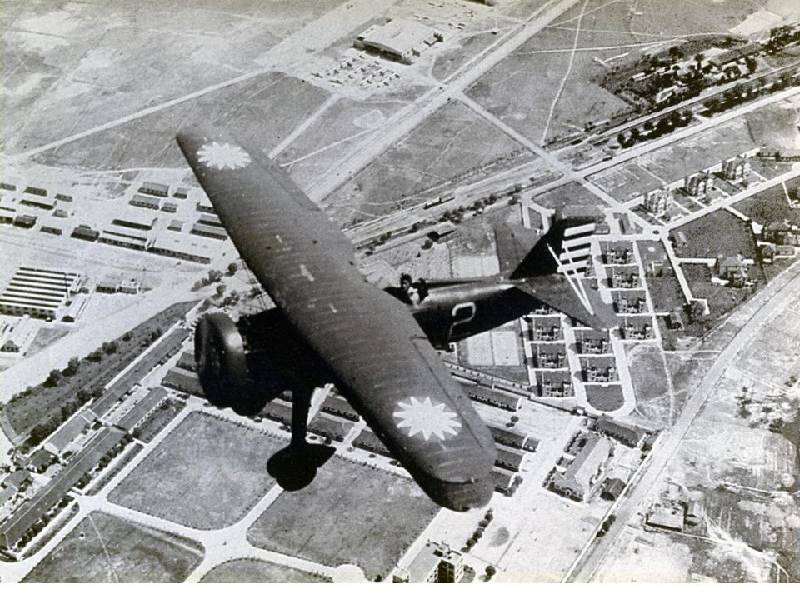
- Curtiss Hawk II over Jianqiao
| Date | 14 August 1937 |
| Location | Hangzhou city, Zhejiang province, Republic of China |
| Result | Chinese victory |

Belligerents
| Japan | China |

Commanders and leaders
| Shinichi Nitani; Asano Ibun | Gao Zhihang; Le Yiqin; Li Guidan; Huang Guanghan; Mao Yingchu |

Strength
| 18 Mitsubishi G3M | 27 Model 68 Hawk III |

Casualties and losses
| 2 aircraft crashed 2 aircraft damaged | 2 aircraft crashed |

The Battle of Jianqiao (simplified Chinese: 笕桥空战; traditional Chinese: 筧橋空戰), or the 814 Aerial War, was a Japanese military campaign during the Second Sino-Japanese War, in which the Republic of China Air Force defended Hangzhou against the Imperial Japanese Navy Air Service on 14 August 1937. The battle concluded with a Chinese victory, in which no Chinese aircraft were shot down by the Imperial Japanese Air Force.

In Taiwan, 14 August is celebrated as its Air Force Day, in honour of this battle.

== Background ==
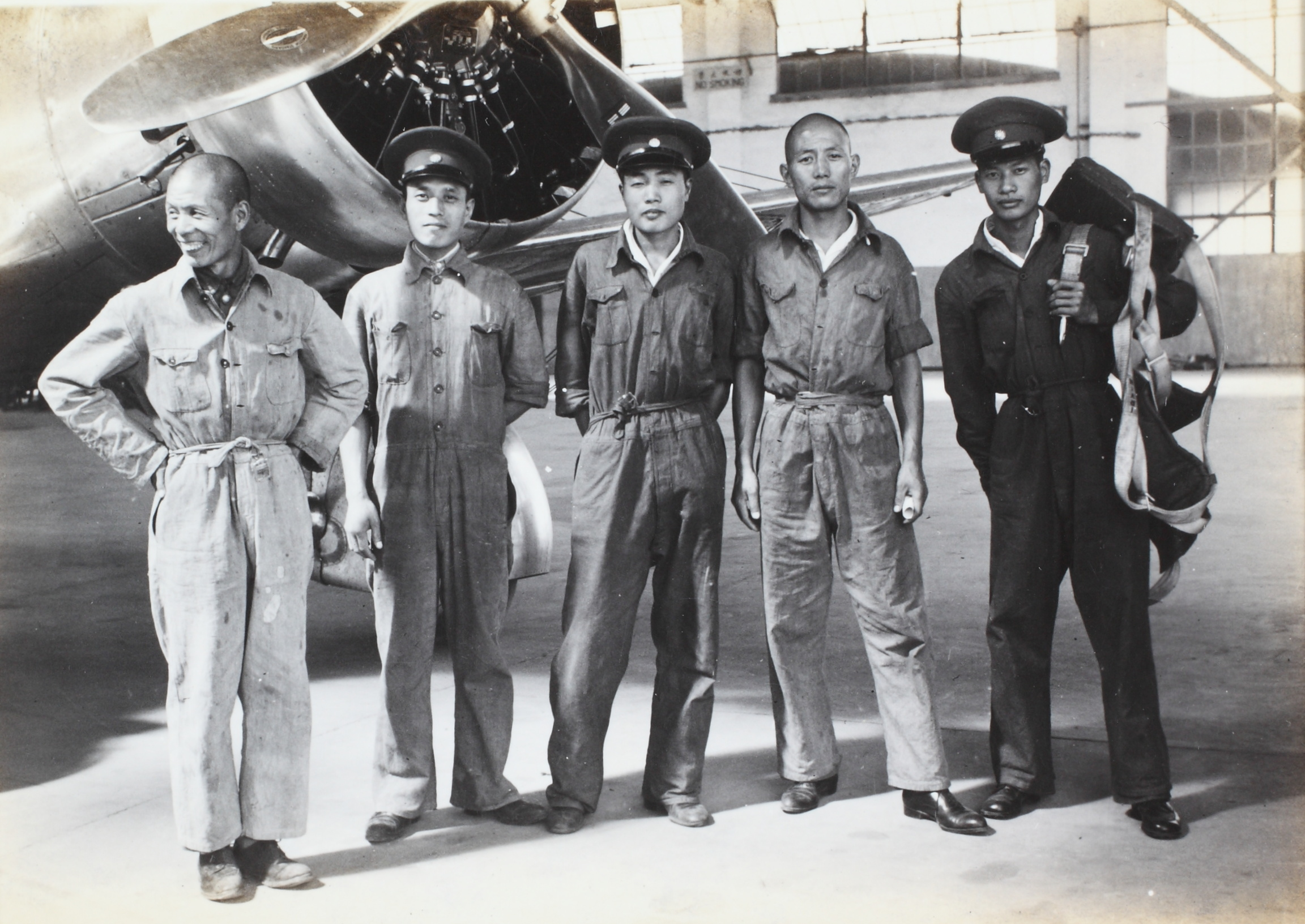
Staff of the Central Aircraft Manufacturing Company at Jianqiao

On 7 July 1937, Japan launched a full-scale invasion of China in the Marco Polo Bridge Incident, after years of encroachment and expansion in northern China. On 9 August, a Japanese naval officer, demanding Chinese troops to leave the area, opened fire on Chinese guards in Shanghai, and was killed by Chinese guards. The Battle of Shanghai began on 13 August 1937. On 14 August, the Chinese army attacked the Japanese settlement in Shanghai. In response to the heightened Japanese threats, the ROCAF deployed he 4th Air Group from Zhoujiakou to Hangzhou to defend its Jianqiao Air Base.

Since the Jianqiao Air Base housed the Central Aviation School, Japanese forces believed that by destroying this site, China would deplete its supply of trained pilots. The Mitsubishi G3M bombers were developed as part of Japan's Pacific War strategy, with a range exceeding 4,000 kilometres. The Japanese military planned to deploy these newly designed bombers in their first long-distance air raid to target and destroy the hangars, repair workshops, ammunition depots, and aircraft stationed on the tarmacs at the Jianqiao, Guangde, and Qiaosi airfields.

== First battle ==
At 12:55 p.m., a squadron of 9 Japanese Mitsubishi G3M bombers of the Kanoya Air Group took off from Taipei, Taiwan, which entered the Chinese airspace near Yongjia, before splitting up to attack near Yongkang. The Japanese aircraft had to break into smaller groups or fly individually, due to poor weather conditions and thick cloud cover, before approaching Jianqiao at an altitude of approximately 500 metres at around 4:00 p.m.

The Chinese air group was divided into three squadrons, each with nine planes, headed by Li Guidan, Huang Guanghan, Mao Yingchu, respectively. Starting to take off from Zhoujiakou at 1:00 p.m., two squadrons directly flew to Jianqiao, while one team made a stopover at Guangde. When the first two Chinese squadrons, namely the 21st and 23rd squadrons, arrived at Jianqiao, they received emergency signals, prompting them to make an emergency landing for refuelling. One of the Japanese bombers, advancing from the northeast, targeted the airport's maintenance centre before veering right. It was then pursued closely by Chinese planes until it crashed near Banshan. Another bomber was brought down by three Chinese aircraft and crashed at Qiaosi.

The Japanese squadron returned to Songshan Air Base at 7:05 p.m., after two planes crashed and one severely damaged due to Chinese attack.

== Second battle ==
At 1:05 p.m., another 9 Mitsubishi G3M bombers took off from Taipei and headed to Guangde via Yongjia. The 22nd Chinese squadron arrived at Guangde at 3:10 p.m. Due to poor weather conditions, the Japanese aircraft arrived late at 4:30 to 4:40 p.m. The Chinese and Japanese aircraft saw each other, but did not engaged in war. The Chinese squadron then continued flying to Jianqiao and arrived at around 6:00 p.m.

A Chinese pilot of 34th squadron began patrolling between Hangzhou and Guangde since 6:00 p.m. On seeing the Japanese squadron of 9 bombers at the northwest of Guangde, it began closely following the Japanese aircraft, with failed attempts to attack. The Japanese bombed only dropped a bomb over the edge of the Guangde Air Base, before it retreated to Hangzhou. The Chinese pilot had to give up chasing due to the nighttime and landed at Guangde at 7:10 p.m.

On arriving over Hangzhou, one of Japanese bombers, noticing the approaching Chinese aircraft, retreated towards the Qiantang River estuary. The Chinese fighters at Jianqiao spotted it when passing over Wengjiabu Airfield, where the lower sky was clear, and engaged it over the Cao'e River. With the oil tank damaged, the bomber landed off the Port of Keelung, which destroyed its hull, yet five crew members of this aircraft survived. Two Chinese aircraft crashed due to fuel depletion, resulting in one pilot's death and another being injured.

== Aftermath ==
With two planes missing, one crashed at the Port of Keelung, and one with damaged landing gears, the Japanese air force only managed to damage two tank trucks and a hangar in China. The Japanese military attributed the failure of this battle to adverse weather conditions and the dispersal of forces before the attack. The victory at Jianqiao boosted national morale among Chinese people. In September 1939, the Nationalist Government of China declared the date of this battle, 14 August, as the Air Force Day, which is still celebrated in Taiwan.

== Popular culture ==
- Heroes of the Eastern Skies (1977), a Taiwanese war drama

== See also ==
- Battle of Shanghai
- Aerial engagements of the Second Sino-Japanese War
