= Dingqiao, Hangzhou =

Dingqiao 丁桥镇
- Town
- Interactive map of Dingqiao
- Coordinates: 30°21′00″N 120°13′22″E
- Country: People's Republic of China
- Province: Zhejiang
- Sub-provincial city: Hangzhou
- District: Jianggan

Area
  - Total: 15.5 km^{2} (6.0 sq mi)
- Elevation: 13 m (43 ft)

Population
  - Total: 25,000
  - Density: 1,600/km^{2} (4,200/sq mi)
- Time zone: UTC+8 (China Standard)
- Postal code: 310021
- Area code: 0571

Dingqiao (simplified Chinese: 丁桥; traditional Chinese: 丁橋; pinyin: Dīngqiáo; Hangzhou dialect: Tinjiau) is a suburban town of Jianggan District, Hangzhou, People's Republic of China. As of 2011, it has 16 residential communities (社区) and 2 villages under its administration. It has a population of 25,000 residing in an area of 15.5 square kilometres (6.0 sq mi).

== See also ==
- List of township-level divisions of Zhejiang
