= Saint-Maurice-de-Satonnay =

- Commune
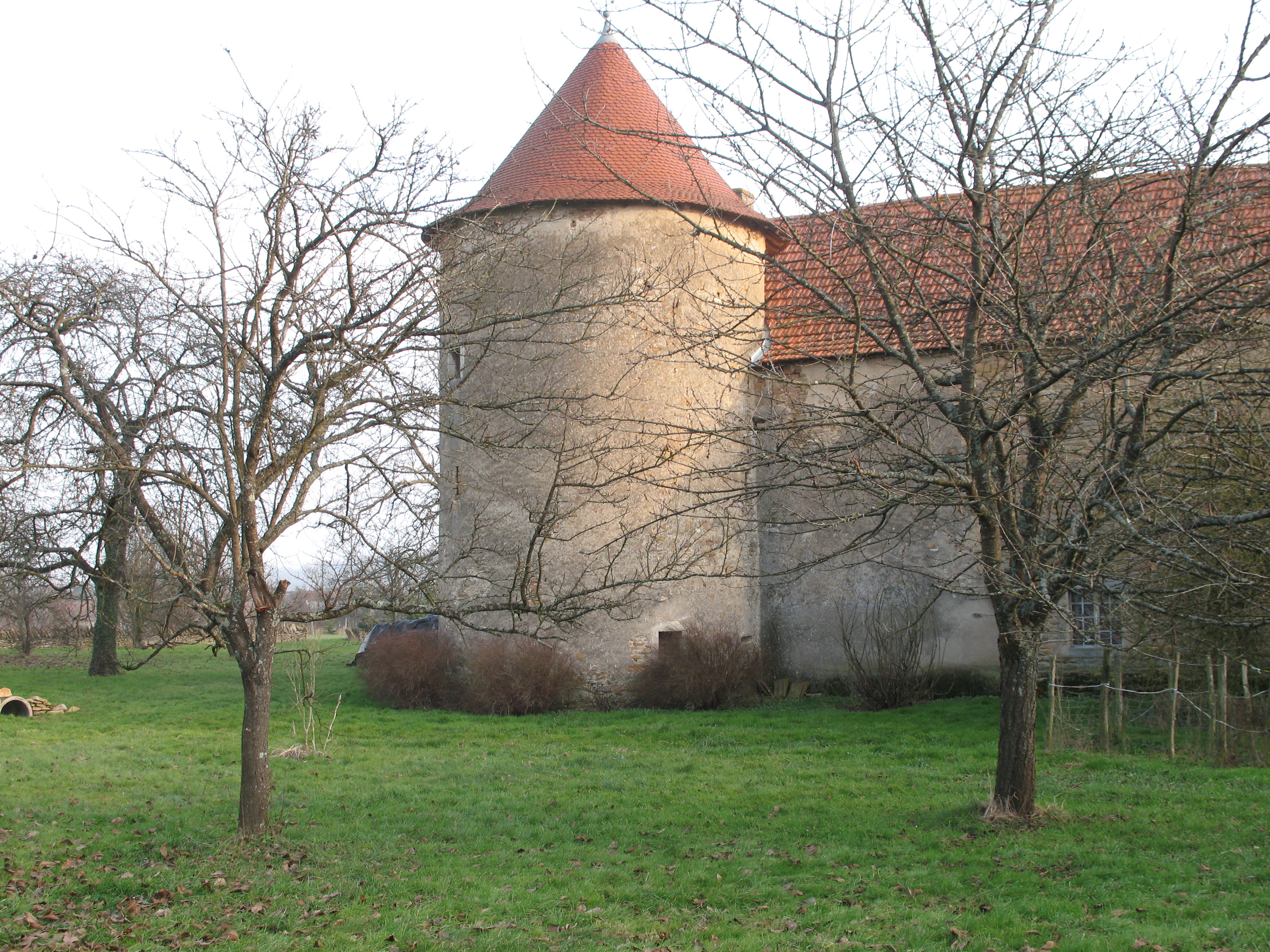
- Chateau of Saint Mauris

- Coat of arms
- Location of Saint-Maurice-de-Satonnay
- Location within France Location within Bourgogne-Franche-Comté
- Coordinates: 46°24′50″N 4°47′02″E
- Country: France
- Region: Bourgogne-Franche-Comté
- Department: Saône-et-Loire
- Arrondissement: Mâcon
- Canton: Hurigny
- Intercommunality: Mâconnais Beaujolais Agglomération
- Area^{1}: 10.33 km^{2} (3.99 sq mi)
- Elevation: 216 m (709 ft)
- Highest elevation: 343 m (1,125 ft)
- Lowest elevation: 201 m (659 ft)
- Population (2023): 505
  - Density: 48.9/km^{2} (127/sq mi)
- Time zone: UTC+01:00 (CET)
  - Summer (DST): UTC+02:00 (CEST)
- INSEE/Postal code: 71460 /71260
- ^{1} French Land Register data, which excludes lakes, ponds, glaciers > 1 km^{2} (0.386 sq mi or 247 acres) and river estuaries.

Saint-Maurice-de-Satonnay (French pronunciation: [sɛ̃ mɔʁis də satɔnɛ]) is a commune in the Saône-et-Loire department in the region of Bourgogne-Franche-Comté in eastern France.

== See also ==
- Communes of the Saône-et-Loire department
