= Heroes of the Eastern Skies =

- Film poster

Chinese name
- Traditional Chinese: 筧橋英烈傳
- Simplified Chinese: 笕桥英烈传
Transcriptions
Standard Mandarin
- Hanyu Pinyin: Jiǎnqiáo Yīngliè Chuán
- Directed by: Chang Tseng-tse
- Written by: Ho Hsiao-chung; Wu Tung-chuan
- Produced by: George F. H. Chang
- Starring: Liang Hsiu-shen; Lee Ching
- Cinematography: Lin Hung-tsung
- Edited by: Wang Chi-yang
- Music by: Huang Mao-shan; Lo Ming-tao
- Production company: Central Motion Pictures Corporation
- Release date: 7 July 1977
- Running time: 100 minutes
- Countries: Taiwan, R.O.C.
- Languages: Mandarin; Japanese

Heroes of the Eastern Skies (Chinese: 筧橋英烈傳; pinyin: jianqiao yinglie zhuan; lit. 'Heroic Martyrs of Jianqiao'), is a Chinese war drama film shot in Taiwan, R.O.C. and based on the true story of a small group of Chinese flying aces in 1937 at the beginning of the Second Sino-Japanese War, specifically depicting events in the Battle of Shanghai, Battle of Nanking and the Battle of Taierzhuang. The film was released on 7 July 1977 in commemoration of the 7/7 Incident which sparked World War II in Asia.

The movie recounts the combat actions between the Chinese Air Force and the invading air power of Imperial Japan with the flashpoint of the airwar set at Jianqiao Airbase. It won 6 awards at the 14th Golden Horse Awards, including Best Film and Best Director (Chang Tseng-tse).

== Cast ==
- Liang Hsiu-shen as Colonel Gao Zhihang (died 21 November 1937 in history). He was the commander of the 4th Air Force Group based in Jianqiao Airfield. He led his group of pilots and maintenance crew to receive new Polikarpov I-16 fighter aircraft at the Lanzhou Donggang Airbase, and while at a refueling stop en route back to frontline action in Nanjing, Colonel Gao and his group were suddenly attacked by a Japanese raid, and he was killed along with his crew chief Feng Qianqing by falling Japanese bombs while on the ground in Zhoujiakou airfield.
- Feng Hai as Lieutenant Shen Chonghui (Zh-Wiki - died 19 August 1937 in history). A man with few words, he was killed when he crashed his plane into a Japanese warship, causing significant damage to the ship; in actual history, he did not hit the enemy ship, and was MIA along with his backseat gunner 2Lt. Chen Xichun, and both later declared KIA)
- Yu Tien-lung as Lieutenant Yan Haiwen (Zh-Wiki - died 17 August 1937 in history). He parachuted from his plane and was surrounded by Japanese soldiers demanding his surrender, but while evading capture, he shot a few soldiers and saving the last bullet for himself, shouting "No captives from China's Air Force!", and shot himself in the head. He was buried with special honors by the Japanese army.
- Chiang Bin as Second Lieutenant Li Yougan (Zh-Wiki - died 18 September 1937 in history). He is shown in the movie being strafed by Japanese fighters in mid-air under his parachute after bailing-out from his burning Hawk III, but in the real-life events, 2Lt. Li Yougan was KIA during an attack against Japanese warships on the Huangpu in Shanghai that day, and shot-down by heavy anti-aircraft fire; Lt. Liu Lanqing (劉蘭清) of the 17th PS, 3rd PG equipped with P-26/281 Peashooters, led by Chinese-American volunteer fighter pilot Capt. John Huang Panyang (not shown in the movie) was in fact a victim of such a heinous mid-air strafing-attack during an air battle over Nanjing on 19 September 1937.
- Chin Han as Major Liu Cuigang (Zh-Wiki - died 26 October 1937 in history), China's top-scoring fighter-ace at that point in time. The movie depicted his death as he crashed his plane into a Japanese tank. In actual history, his death was due to an accident while flying to Taiyuan city to assume command of air operations at the Battle of Taiyuan from the wounded 28th Pursuit Squadron commander Captain Chan Kee-Wong (another Chinese-American volunteer air force combatant) of fighter operations on the northern front.
- Lee Ching as Ye Rongran, Gao's wife.
- Sally Chen as Xu Xilin, Liu's wife.
- Terry Hu as Zheng Qiuxia, Li's wife.
- Ming Hu (胡銘, actress Terry Hu's younger brother), as fighter pilot Liu Zhesheng
- Carter Wong as a Japanese pilot.

== Historical accuracy ==
In the movie, Col. Gao is accurately depicted recuperating in Lu Shan from serious injuries sustained from an aerial combat engagement, but is seen listening to a radio broadcast announcement of "heroic martyrs of our air force Yue Yiqin, Zheng Shaoyu, Tan Wen, Shen Chonghui giving their lives for our nation", to which the convalescing Col. Gao furiously reacts to by throwing a cup and lamenting how he must wait while his brothers are fighting and dying; while Tan Wen and Shen Chonghui were in fact KIA while Col. Gao was convalescing, Yue Yiqin died over a week after the death of Col. Gao himself, and Zheng Shaoyu died in April 1942.

The depiction of Hawk III pilot Li Yougan getting shot down by Imperial Japanese A5Ms and then being strafed to death while descending in his parachute, was a lionizing of 17th PS, 3rd PG P-26/281 fighter pilot Liu Lanqing (劉蘭清) who was in fact killed when strafed to death mid-air after bailing-out in his parachute in an air battle over Nanjing on 19 September 1937; Li Yougan himself was actually KIA while getting shot-down by anti-aircraft fire on 18 September 1937 during dive-bombing/strafing attacks on Imperial Japanese Navy warships in the Battle of Shanghai.

== Awards and nominations ==
1977 - 14th Golden Horse Awards

- Won - Best Feature Film
- Won - Chang Tseng-tse, Best Director
- Won - Ho Hsiao-chung, Best Screenplay
- Won - Lin Hung-tsung, Best Cinematography
- Won - Wang Chi-yang, Best Editing
- Won - Hsin Chiang-sheng, Best sound recording
- Nominated - Liang Hsiu-shen, Best Actor

== See also ==
- Air Warfare of WWII from the Sino-Japanese War perspective
  - Battle of Jianqiao
- Departed Heroes, a 2011 Chinese TV series about Gao and others
- Development of the Nationalist Air Force of China; the combined effort of overseas Chinese volunteer pilots and former warlord air force units joining the central authority of the Republic of China Air Force for the War of Resistance/World War II against the Imperial Japanese invasion from 1937 to 1945
