= Bernard Barny de Romanet =

Bernard Henri Barny de Romanet
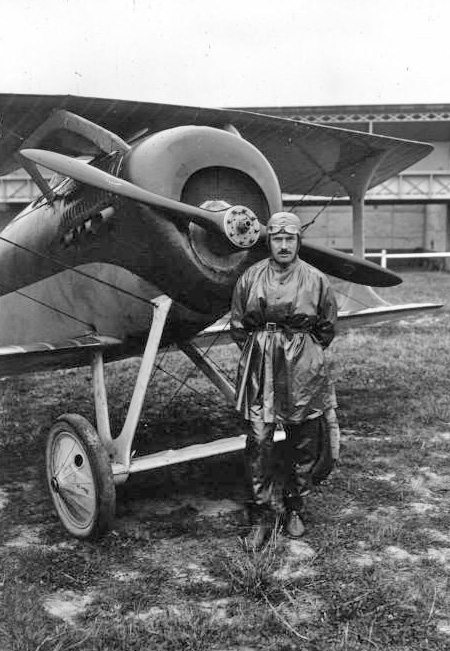
- de Romanet in 1920
- Born: 28 January 1894; Saint-Maurice-de-Satonnay, Saône-et-Loire, France
- Died: 23 September 1921 (aged 27); Étampes, France
- Burial place: Cimetière Saint Brice, Mâcon
- Military career
- Allegiance: France
- Branch: French Army
- Service years: 1913–1918
- Rank: Lieutenant
- Units: 16e Régiment de Chasseurs; 56e Régiment d'Infanterie; Escadrille 51; Escadrille 37
- Commands: Escadrille 167
- Awards: Légion d'honneur Médaille militaire Croix de guerre

Lieutenant Bernard Henri Barny de Romanet (28 January 1894 – 23 September 1921) was a French World War I flying ace credited with 18 aerial victories.

Barny de Romanet was born in Saint-Maurice-de-Satonnay, Saône-et-Loire, and was educated at the Collège des Minimes, Chalon-sur-Saône, and then at the Collège des Montgré in Villefranche-sur-Saône, gaining his baccalauréat before going on to study at the Lycée Lamartine at Mâcon.

He joined the French army in October 1913, serving in the 16e Régiment de Chasseurs, a cavalry unit, at the beginning of the war, later transferring to the 56e Régiment d'Infanterie. He transferred into the French air service in July 1915. Six months later, in January 1916, de Romanet received his brevet (permit) as a pilot. His first assignment to Escadrille 51 was as a Caudron reconnaissance pilot. He trained as a fighter pilot in February 1917 and made the transition to flying single-seater Nieuport fighters for Escadrille 37. His first victory was scored on 3 May 1917. He waited almost a year before continuing, with his second triumph coming on 31 March 1918. He became an ace on 30 June 1918, and a double ace on 22 August. That was his last victory and last day with Escadrille 37. He was then charged with forming Escadrille 167, a Spad squadron, assumed its command, and scored eight more victories while leading it.

After the war de Romanet became a successful sporting pilot, breaking the World Air Speed record on two occasions in 1920. Barny de Romanet died in a flying accident on 23 September 1921, testing the aircraft he was to fly in the 1921 Coupe Deutsch de la Meurthe race: the accident was ascribed to the fabric becoming detached from the aircraft's wing.

He is buried in the Cimetière Saint Brice in Mâcon.

== Honors and awards ==
- Médaille militaire citation, 23 May 1917:

A pilot as able in pursuit aviation as he was in reconnaissance. Has had numerous combats. On 3 May 1917 he attacked, over their lines, two enemy scouts and downed one of them. Already cited three times in orders.

- Chevalier de la Légion d'honneur citation:

"Elite officer, who received notice in the cavalry at the beginning of the war by bold reconnaissances, then in observation aviation, and finally in pursuit aviation where his brilliant qualities as a pilot, his coolness, and his daring in combat are always cited as examples. He inspires his patrols to attack enemy planes very superior in number putting them to flight and flaming one of them. Also, recently he downed successively two German planes, reporting therewith his 16th and 17th victories."
