= Georges Lienhart =

French flying ace

Georges Frederic Lienhart
- Born: 1 June 1886; Rougegoutte, France
- Died: 14 June 1952 (aged 66); Belfort, France
- Military career
- Allegiance: France
- Branch: Flying service
- Rank: Adjutant
- Units: Escadrille F.216; Escadrille SPA.37
- Awards: Médaille militaire Croix de Guerre; Italian Croce di Guerra

Adjutant Georges Frederic Lienhart was a World War I flying ace credited with five aerial victories.

== Biography ==
See also Aerial victory standards of World War I

Georges Frederic Lienhart was born in Rougegoutte, France on 1 June 1886. He began his mandatory military service on 9 October 1907 as an infantryman. He was mobilized from the reserves at the start of World War I, to serve as a foot soldier.

He was sent to pilot training on 4 March 1916. His Military Pilot's Brevet was issued to him on 29 July 1916. After advanced training, he was posted to Escadrille F.216 on 13 October 1916. After serving there, on 29 March 1917, he was sent for further instruction as a fighter pilot. On 25 April 1917, he was promoted to Adjutant. He then served with the X Armee in Italy.

On 30 May 1918, he was posted to Escadrille SPA.37. While with them, he would shoot down enemy airplanes and an observation balloon, with three of the victories coming on 26 September 1918. On 24 October 1918, he was commissioned as Sous lieutenant.

Georges Frederic Lienhart died in Belfort, France on 14 June 1952.

== Awards ==
Médaille Militaire
"Elite pilot who for 18 months distinguished himself in Army Corps aviation. Has continued to assert himself as a fighter of exceptional value, consistently affirming his superiority over the enemy. On 26 September 1918, he flamed a balloon and downed a two-seater, bringing to four the number of his victories. Four citations." Médaille Militaire citation, 20 October 1918

Lienhart was also awarded the Croix de Guerre with five palmes and an etoile de viermeil. The Italian government also granted him its Croce di Guerra.
