= Hangzhou Jianqiao Airport =

Military airport in Hangzhou, Zhejiang, China

Hangzhou Jianqiao Airport 杭州笕桥机场
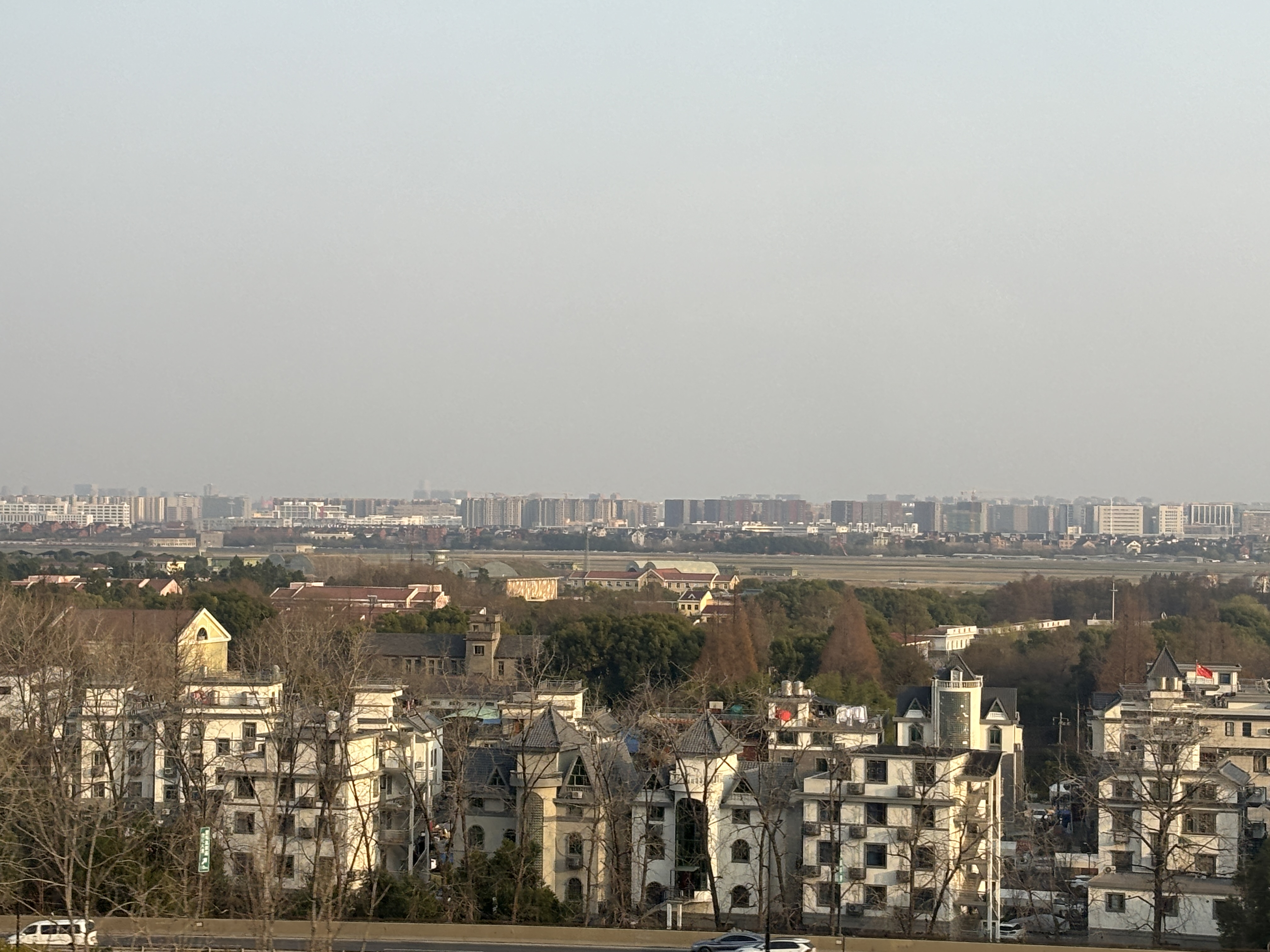
- IATA: none; ICAO: none

Summary
- Airport type: Military
- Owner: People's Liberation Army
- Operator: People's Liberation Army Air Force
- Serves: Hangzhou
- Location: Jianqiao, Jianggan, Hangzhou, Zhejiang, China
- Opened: 1 January 1957 (commercial)
- Passenger services ceased: 29 December 2000
- Built: 1931 (military)
- Elevation AMSL: 5 m / 16 ft
- Coordinates: 30°19′59″N 120°14′20″E

Map
- Location of airport in China

Runways
Direction	Length		Surface
Direction	m	ft	Surface
07/25	3,200	10,500	Asphalt

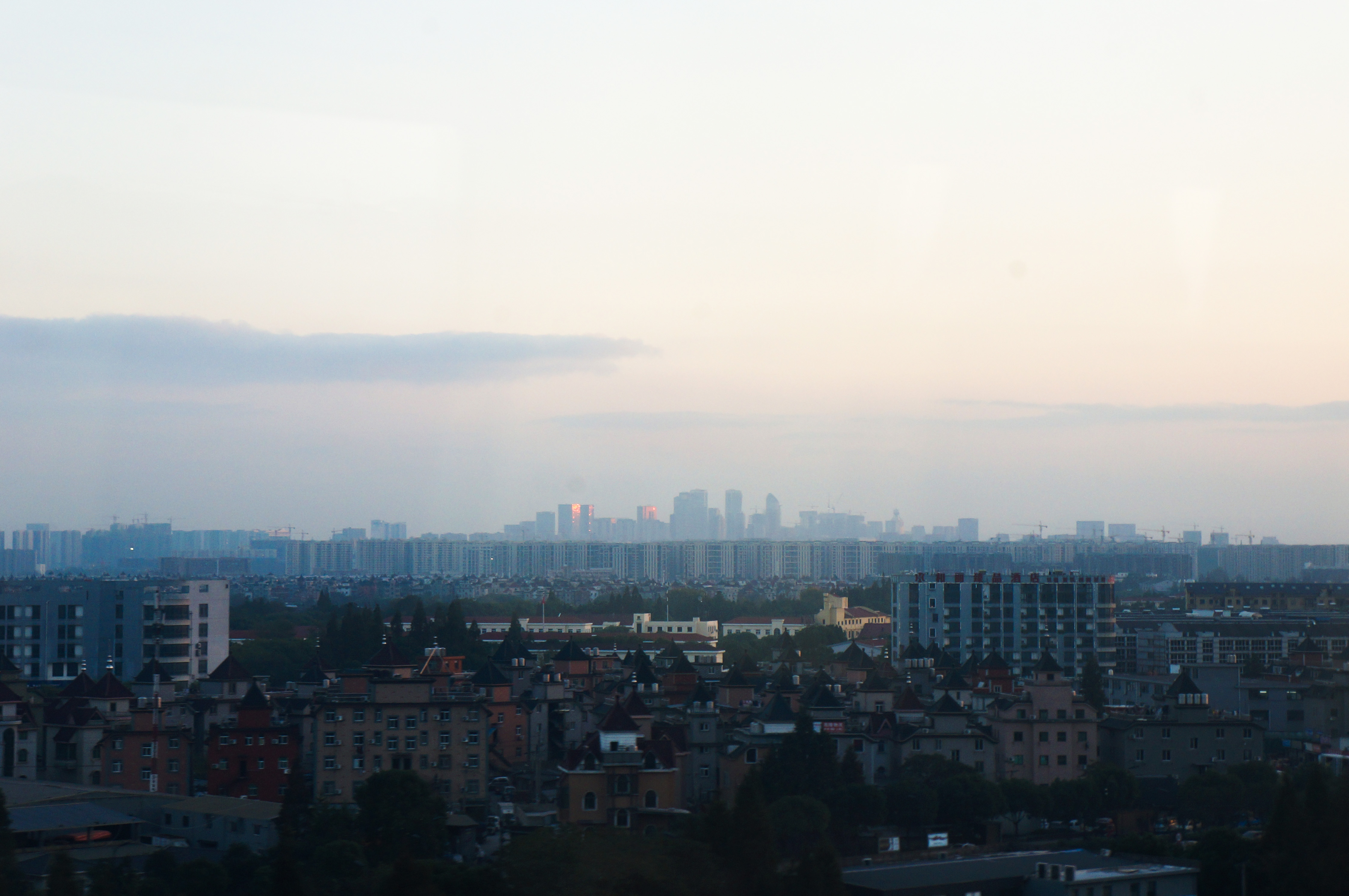
Cityscape of Jianggan District, taken near the airport. Heights of the buildings vary with the distance to the airport due to the height-restriction policy.

Hangzhou Jianqiao Airport (or Hangzhou Air Base), formerly romanized as Schien Chiao, is a People's Liberation Army Air Force Base in Hangzhou, the capital city of East China's Zhejiang province. It is located in the town of Jianqiao in Jianggan District, about 7 miles northeast of the city center. It served as the city's civilian airport from 1 January 1957 until 29 December 2000, when all commercial flights were transferred to the newly built Hangzhou Xiaoshan International Airport.

== History ==
Jianqiao was developed into an airfield and flight training institute in 1922 under support and directives of the Anhui clique warlord Lu Yongxiang and World War I veteran ace fighter pilot Zhu Binhou, with a squadron of aircraft that included Breguet 14s. Jianqiao air force base was then consolidated in 1931 in wake of the Mukden Incident by the Nationalist Government of the Republic of China, and was a location of major air battles between the Chinese air force and the Imperial Japanese air forces (such as the Jianqiao Battle) during the Second Sino-Japanese War (1937–45); battles scenes of Jianqiao which were re-enacted in a Taiwanese motion-picture patriotic war drama Heroes of the Eastern Skies (or Heroes of Jianqiao). In 1956 it was converted to a public airport and civil flights started on January 1, 1957. The airport was expanded in 1971 in preparation for the official visit of President Richard Nixon of the United States. In 1990 the runway was again lengthened and widened to 3,200 meters long and 50 meters wide. The airport handled 2,167,400 passengers in 1999, and served 46 routes in 2000 before all civil flights were transferred to the newly built Hangzhou Xiaoshan International Airport.

When Jianqiao Airport serviced commercial flights, it housed the headquarters of Zhejiang Airlines.

== Accidents and incidents ==
- On 8 January 2022, a Tupolev Tu-204 cargo aircraft operating as Aviastar-TU flight 6534 caught fire during pushback. All eight crew on board escaped, with three suffering burns. Investigators attributed the accident to an oxygen leak in the cockpit.

== See also ==
- List of airports in China
- List of People's Liberation Army Air Force airbases
- Republic of China Air Force Academy
- Heroes of the Eastern Skies
