= Zhejiang Airlines =

Chinese airline

CNAC Zhejiang Airlines
| IATA | ICAO | Call sign |
|---|---|---|
| — | CJG | ZHEJIANG |
- Founded: 1999 by the China National Aviation Holding
- Ceased operations: 2004 (absorbed by Air China)
- Destinations: Asia
- Headquarters: Jianqiao Airport, Hangzhou, China
- Website: zjair.com

Zhejiang Airlines (Chinese: 浙江航空; pinyin: Zhèjiāng Hángkōng) was an airline based in Jianqiao Airport in Hangzhou, Zhejiang, China. The airline was wholly owned by China National Aviation Holding. During 2004, as part of a consolidation of the Chinese aviation industry, Air China absorbed Zhejiang Airlines and became its Hangzhou base.

== Fleet Data ==
- 4 - Airbus A319
- 5 - Airbus A320
- 3 - Bombardier DHC-8-301
- 1 - Tupolev Tu-154M

== Accidents and incidents ==
On November 8, 1993, A Bombardier Dash 8 with 54 passengers and 5 crew members were hijacked to Taiwan, the hijacker sent a note to the flight attendants claiming he has a bomb and demanding to be flown to Taiwan, when it arrived in Taiwan, the hijacker surrender peacefully. The bomb the hijacker was talking about turned out to be two bars of soap wrapped around a newspaper with a wire.
