= Martin B-10 =

American bomber aircraft

B-10
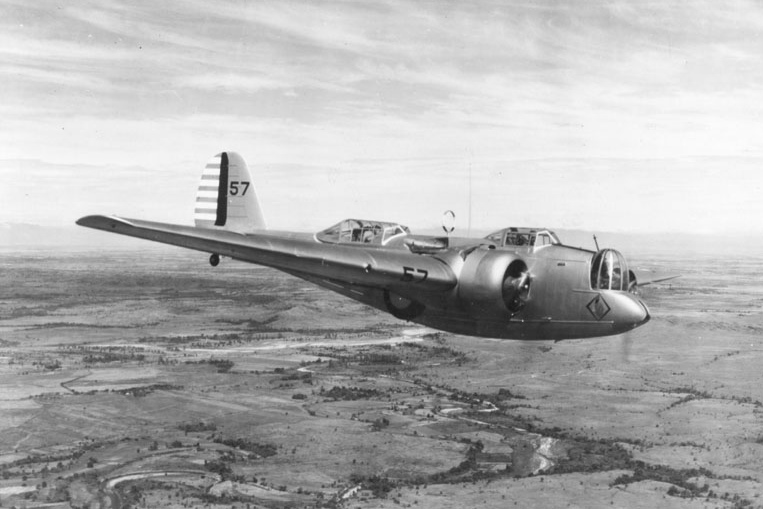
- B-10 being flown during a training session at Maxwell Field

General information
- Type: Bomber aircraft
- Manufacturer: Glenn L. Martin Company
- Designer: Peyton M. Magruder
- Primary users: United States Army Air Corps Netherlands East Indies Air Force; Turkish Air Force
- Number built: 121 B-10; 82 model 166; 32 B-12; 348 of all variants, incl. 182 export versions

History
- Manufactured: 1933–1940
- Introduction date: November 1934
- First flight: 16 February 1932
- Retired: 1949 (Royal Thai Air Force)
- Variant: Martin Model 146

The Martin B-10 is a bomber aircraft designed by the Glenn L. Martin Company. Entering service in June 1934, it was the first all-metal monoplane bomber to be regularly used by the United States Army Air Corps. It was also the first mass-produced bomber whose performance was superior to that of the Army's pursuit aircraft of the time.

The B-10 served as the airframe for the B-12, B-13, B-14, A-15, and O-45 designations – using Pratt & Whitney engines instead of Wright Cyclones. A total of 348 of all versions were built. The largest users were the US, with 166, and the Netherlands, with 121.

== Design and development ==
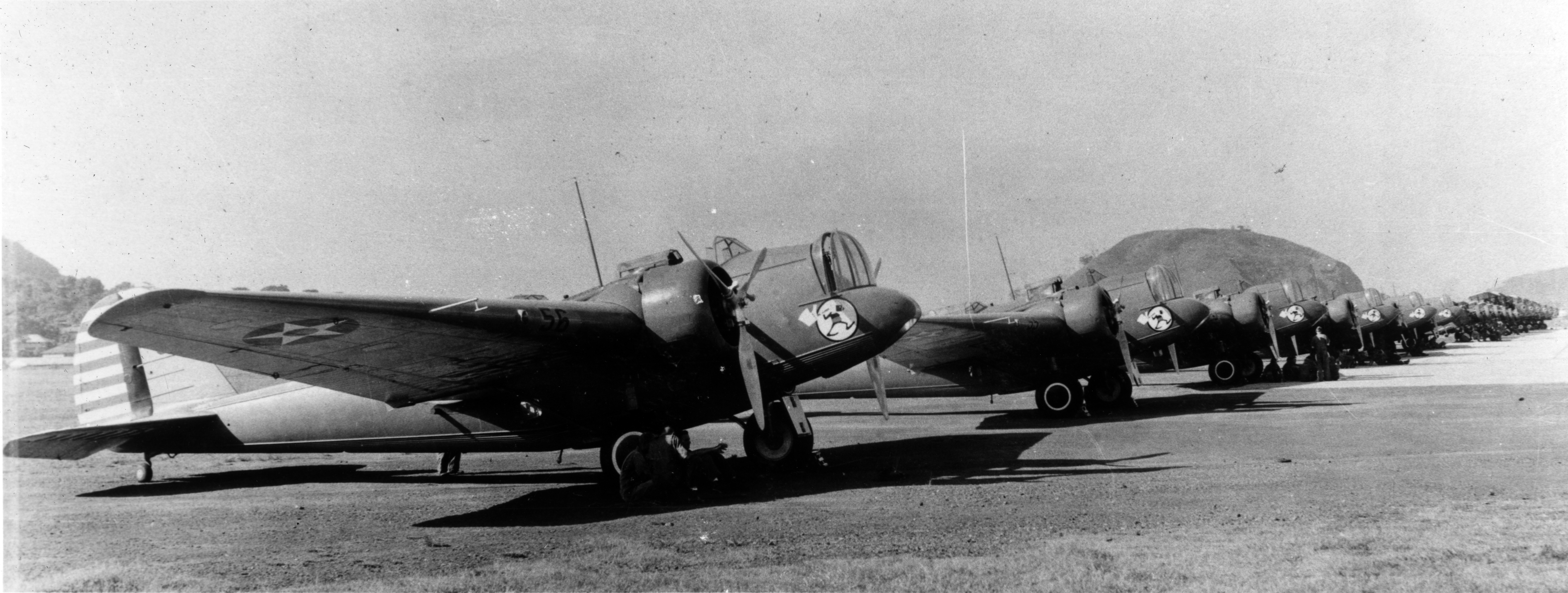
Martin B-10, 25th Bombardment Squadron, Panama Canal Zone

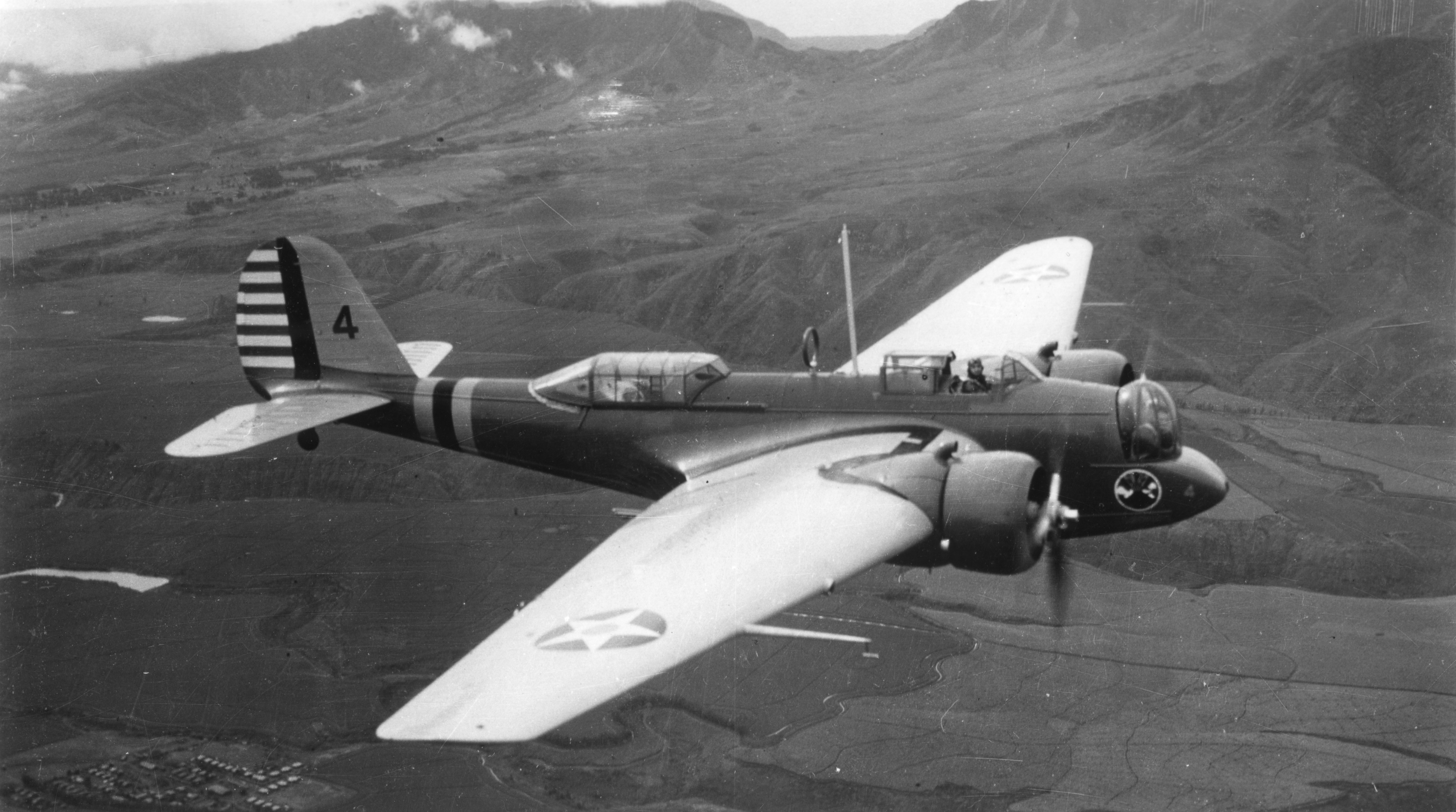
Martin B-10 during exercises over Oahu, Hawaii, 1941

The B-10 began a revolution in bomber design. Its all-metal monoplane airframe, along with its features of closed cockpits, rotating gun turrets (almost simultaneously with the 1933 British Boulton & Paul Overstrand biplane bomber's own enclosed nose-turret), retractable landing gear, internal bomb bay, and full engine cowlings, became the standard for bomber designs worldwide for decades. It made all existing bombers completely obsolete. Martin received the 1932 Collier Trophy for designing the XB-10.

The B-10 began as the Martin Model 123, a private venture by the Glenn L. Martin Company of Baltimore, Maryland. It had a crew of four: pilot, copilot, nose gunner and fuselage gunner. As in previous bombers, the four crew compartments were open, but it had a number of design innovations as well.

These innovations included a deep belly for an internal bomb bay and retractable main landing gear. Its 600 hp (447 kW) Wright SR-1820-E Cyclone engines provided sufficient power. The Model 123 first flew on 16 February 1932 and was delivered for testing to the U.S. Army on 20 March as the XB-907. After testing it was sent back to Martin for redesigning and was rebuilt as the XB-10.

The XB-10 delivered to the Army had major differences from the original aircraft. Where the Model 123 had Townend rings, the XB-10 had full NACA cowlings to decrease drag. It also sported a pair of 675 hp (503 kW) Wright R-1820-19 engines, and an 8-foot (2.4 m) increase in the wingspan, along with an enclosed nose turret. When the XB-10 flew during trials in June, it recorded a speed of 197 mph (317 km/h) at 6,000 ft (1,829 m). This was an impressive performance for 1932.

Following the success of the XB-10, a number of changes were made, including reduction to a three-man crew and addition of canopies for all crew positions. The Army ordered 48 of these on 17 January 1933. The first 14 aircraft were designated YB-10 and delivered to Wright Field, starting in November 1933, and used in the Army Air Corps Mail Operation. The production model of the XB-10, the YB-10, was very similar to its prototype.

== Operational history ==
=== United States ===
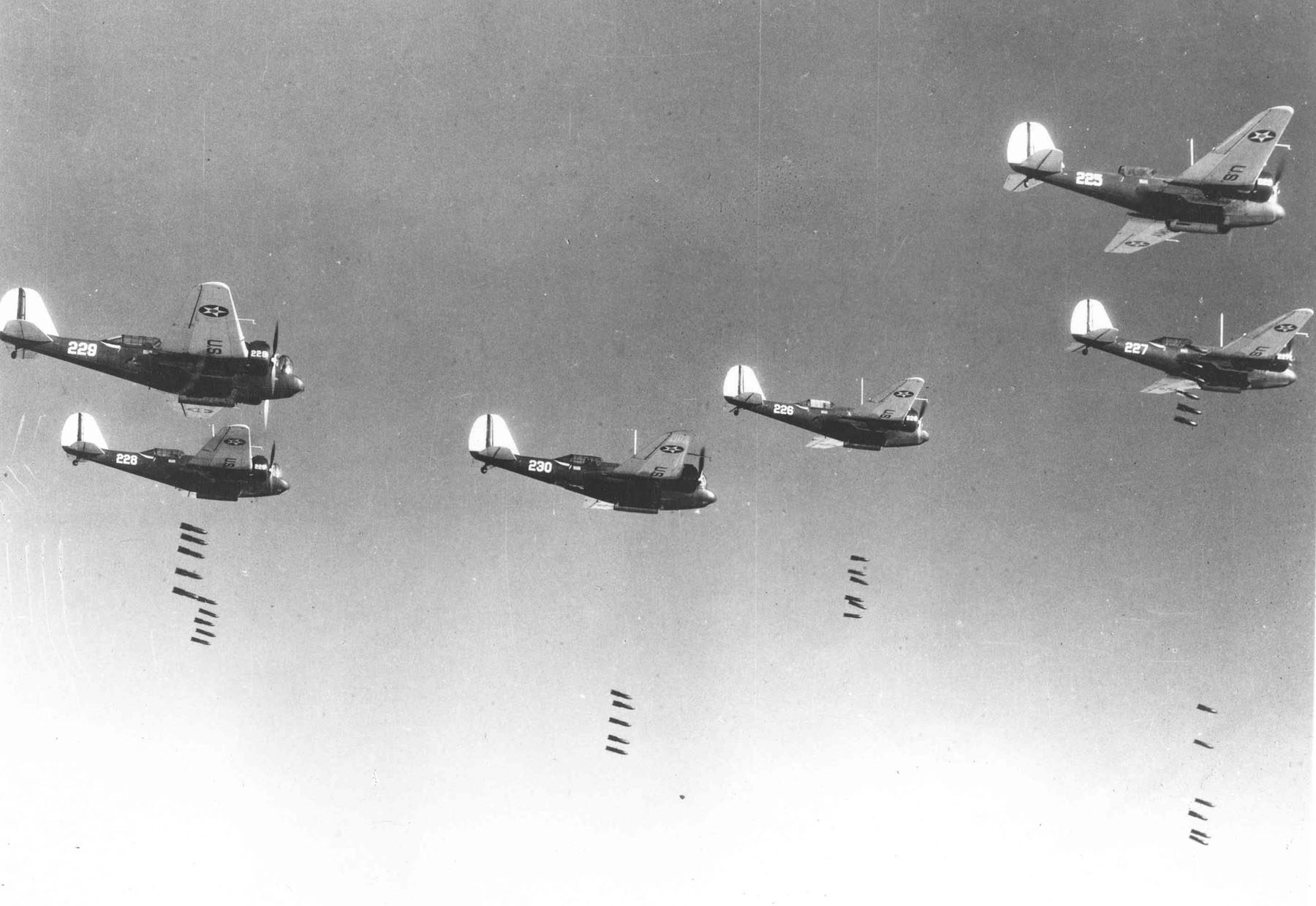
Martin B-10B during exercises

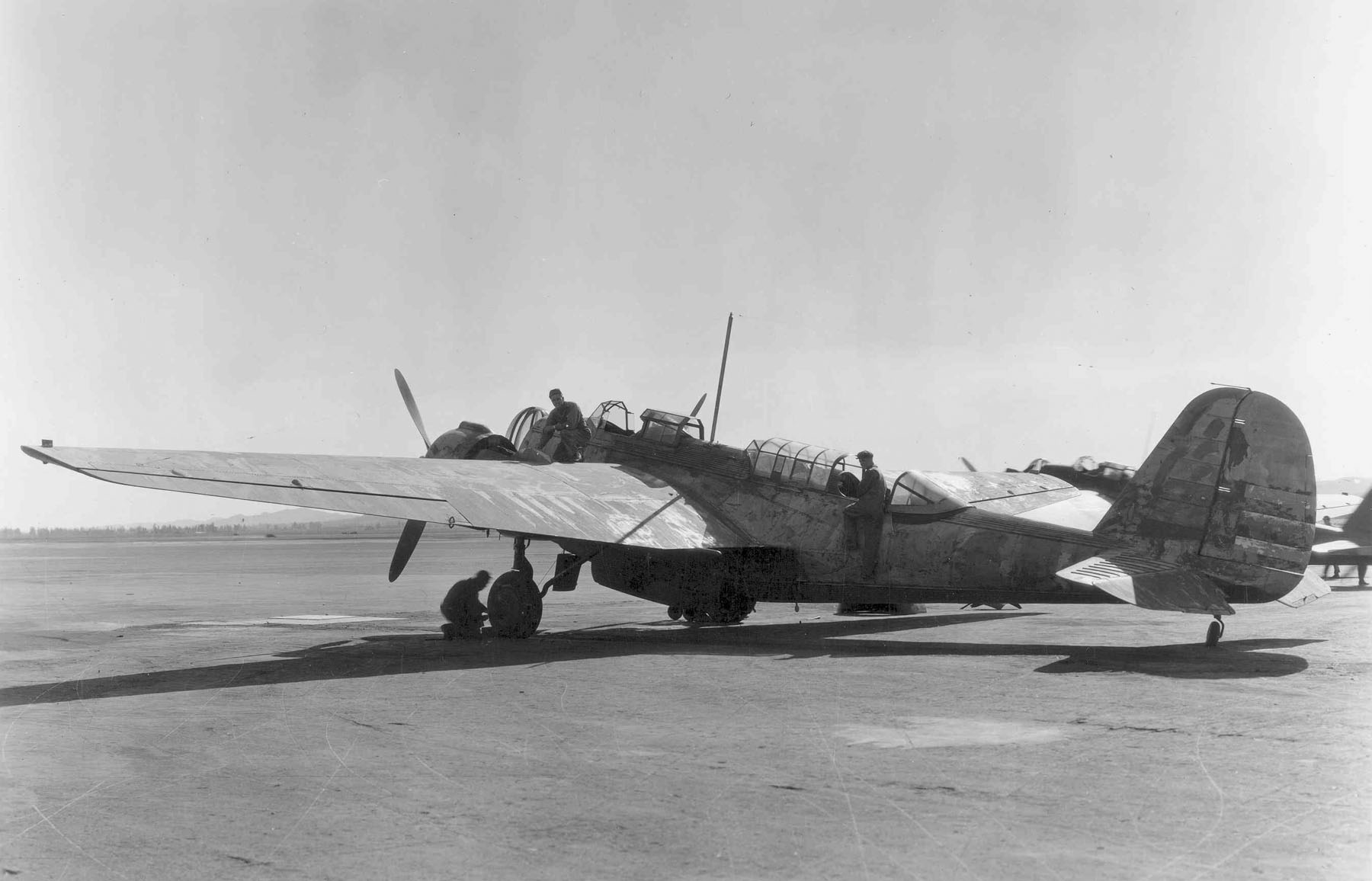
Martin B-12 at March Field, California, 1935

In 1935, the Army ordered an additional 103 aircraft designated B-10B. These had only minor changes from the YB-10. Shipments began in July 1935. B-10Bs served with the 2d Bomb Group at Langley Field, the 9th Bomb Group at Mitchel Field, the 19th Bomb Group at March Field, the 6th Composite Group in the Panama Canal Zone, and the 4th Composite Group in the Philippines. In addition to conventional duties in the bomber role, some modified YB-10s and B-12As were operated for a time on large twin floats for coastal patrol.

In February 1936, the US Army Air Corps used 13 B-10Bs of the 49th Bomb Squadron to drop supplies to the residents of Virginia's Tangier Island and Maryland's Smith Island; with ships unable to reach the islands due to heavy ice in the Chesapeake Bay, the islanders faced starvation after a severe winter storm. The B-10B supply flights followed earlier supply flights to the islands by the Goodyear Blimp Enterprise on 2 February 1936 and by the squadron's Keystone B-6A bombers on 9 and 10 February 1936.

With its advanced performance, the Martin company fully expected that export orders for the B-10 would flood in. The U.S. Army owned the rights to the Model 139 design. Once the Army's orders had been filled in 1936, Martin received permission to export Model 139s, and delivered versions to several air forces. These included six Model 139Ws sold to Siam in April 1937, powered by Wright R-1820-G3 Cyclone engines, and 20 Model 139Ws sold to Turkey in September 1937, powered by R-1820-G2 engines.

=== China ===
In July 1936, the Martin B-10 was put up for export, with the first sale being made to the Republic of China Air Force in the same year, purchasing six Model 139WC-1s and three Model 139WC-2s. When introduced, it was the fastest aircraft in China.

The 139WC was primarily used for night bombing and maritime reconnaissance.

On 25 August 1937, as the air battles intensified in the early part of the Second Sino-Japanese War, five Chinese Nationalist Air Force bombers of the 8th BG, 19th and 30th Squadrons consisting of three Heinkel He 111As and two Martin B-10s, flying from their base in Nanjing to Shanghai, successfully dropped their bombs on Japanese landing forces at Liuhe, Taicang, northwest of Shanghai. However, Japanese aircraft pursued the bombers and shot up two of the Heinkels, forcing them to crash land; two crew members were killed on the ground by Japanese aircraft strafing them.

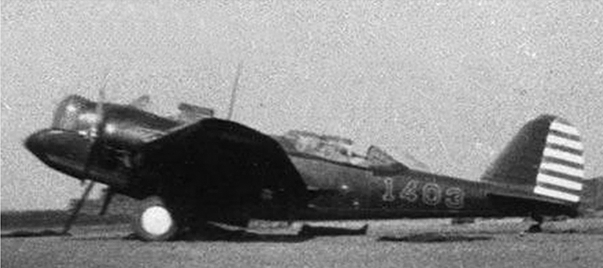
ROCAF Martin 139WC

As the National Revolutionary Army of China fought desperately to hold onto their remaining positions in the Battle of Shanghai, the Chinese Air Force launched a major strike with a motley mix of aircraft against Japanese positions in Shanghai on 14 October 1937, consisting of three B-10s, two Heinkel He 111As, five Douglas O-2MCs, five Northrop Gammas, and three Curtiss Hawk IIIs from Nanjing in the late afternoon; in the evening, one bomber was launched every hour from Nanjing to attack Japanese positions in Shanghai until 03:00 on 15 October.

On 19 May 1938, two B-10s of the 2nd BG, 14th Squadron, led by Capt. Hsu Huan-sheng and Lt. Teng Yen-bo, successfully flew the first air raid on mainland Japan; the unescorted nighttime raid over Japan saw the B-10s dropped 2 million leaflets in "alerting the conscience of the Japanese people against atrocities committed by the Japanese invasion and occupation of China", over the cities of Nagasaki, Fukuoka, Kurume, Saga, and others, while reconnoitering airbases, ports, warships and factories.

=== Dutch East Indies ===
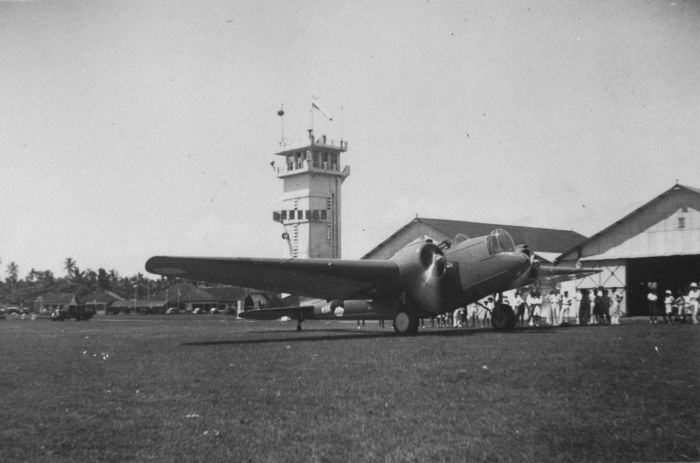
Dutch Martin 139 at Andir in 1937

In the mid-1930s, the Netherlands government adopted a doctrine for defense of the Netherlands East Indies, which relied on the use of land-based bombers against any attacking force, with orders for defensive fighters cancelled to pay for the bomber force. The Martin 139 was chosen in preference to the Dutch Fokker T.V, as its all metal construction was considered more robust than the steel tube and fabric Fokker, while the Martin bomber was also already in production and therefore would be available sooner. Twelve Martin 139 WH-1s were ordered for the Royal Netherlands East Indies Army Air Force (ML-KNIL) in 1936, followed by 26 improved WH-2s in March 1937, sufficient bombers to equip a Group of three squadrons. In December 1937, an order was placed for 39 Martin 139 WH-3s, followed by an order for 40 Martin 139 WH-3As in November 1938. Two more Martin 139 WH-3As were ordered in July 1939 to replace aircraft lost during delivery. The last of these attrition replacement aircraft was delivered in March 1940, including the last Martin B-10/139 built. On the outbreak of war with Japan in December 1941, about 58 Martins (WH-3 and WH-3As) were operational with six squadrons, with about 20 more of the older variants in reserve. B-10s of the ML-KNIL served in the defense of the Dutch East Indies.

During the start of Pacific War, Dutch Martin units were as follows:

- Ie Vliegtuiggroep (VLG-I) based on Andir Airfield, Bandoeng which consisted of 1e Afdeling (1-VLG-I) and 2e Afdeling (2-VLG-I), each has nine Martin 139WH-3/3A with additional two aircraft as reserve. Each afdeling has a detachment during the war, with the Patrouille Butner of 1-VLG-I stationed at Tarakan and Patrouille Cooke of 2-VLG-I stationed at Samarinda II Airfield, Melak.
- IIe Vliegtuiggroep (VLG-II) based on Singosari Airfield, Malang which consisted of 1e Afdeling (1-VLG-II) with nine WH-3/3A with three additional reserves and three WH-2. During the war, four patrouille consisted of three aircraft plus a reserve were created from 1-VLG-II, with the crews mobilized from Kalidjati flight school.
- IIIe Vliegtuiggroep (VLG-III) based on Tjililitan Airfield, Batavia which consisted of 1e Afdeling (1-VLG-III) and 3e Afdeling (3-VLG-III), each equipped with nine WH-3/3A with two additional reserves, and 2e Afdeling (2-VLG-III) with nine WH-2 with two additional reserves. 7e Afdeling Bommenwerpers, a reserve unit mobilized on 15 December 1941, were placed under VLG-III and consisted of one WH-2, two WH-3 and six WH-3A.

==== Malayan campaign ====
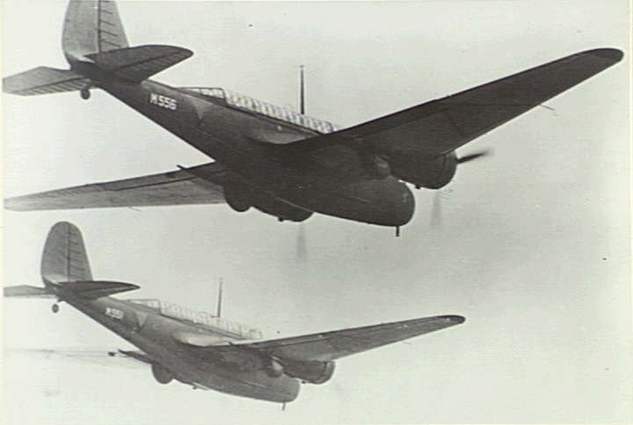
Dutch Martin Model 166 over Malaya in January 1942

In efforts to reinforce the British defense of the Malay Peninsula, the Dutch East Indies sent some ML-KNIL squadrons. Included were 22 Martin 139s from VLG-III that were organized into three squadrons, which arrived at Singapore on 9 December 1941. Due to a lack of coordination, British AA mistook the Dutch Martins for enemy aircraft and engaged them as they neared Singapore. The Martins were then stationed at Sembawang.

In early January 1942, Dutch Martins along with British Blenheim bombers sortied over the west coast of Malaya to halt the Japanese advance. On 8 January, nine Martin and four Australian Hudson attacked a suspected Japanese seaplane tender anchored offshore in South China Sea, but the results were inconclusive. In the next day, nine Martin "quite successfully" bombed several Japanese ships unloading cargo at Kuantan. Two Martins were shot down by the Japanese near Penang on 1 January, while a further four Martins were lost while attacking Japanese forces on the Muar River on 19 January. On the same day, Dutch fighter squadrons were withdrawn to Sumatra, while the Martins were also withdrawn to Java three days later. An additional two Martins were destroyed and another two were damaged during an air raid at Sembawang on 22 January.

==== Dutch East Indies campaign ====
From 16 to 20 December 1941, Dutch Martins based at Singkawang and Samarinda launched attacks against Japanese invasion fleet and shipping off Miri, British Borneo. One Martin bomber was shot down by F1M "Pete" floatplanes from Kamikawa Maru on 19 December, and a total of three Martins were destroyed by Japanese raids against Singkawang II airfield on 22 and 24 December. The Martins sank a transport ship and the minesweeper W-6 off Kuching on 26 December. Two days later, three Martins launched a raid against Japanese-held Miri airfield, two were shot down by A6M Zeroes and one was damaged.

=== Thailand ===
Six B-10s formed the medium bomber force of the Royal Thai Air Force at the start of the 1940–1941 Franco-Thai War. They flew several bombing missions during the war, with their first mission against Xieng Khuang, Laos and a nearby airfield on 15 December 1940, with the last mission, against Sisophon in what is now Cambodia on 28 January at the very end of the Franco-Thai War. Later on, B-10s had been assigned to the airfield in Phrae as a part of Phayap Army to invade Shan state.

=== Turkey ===
After being delivered in September 1937, the Martin 139WTs were assigned to the 55th and 56th Tayyare Bölüğü (Aviation Squadrons) of the 9th Tayyare Taburu (Aviation Battalion). During the Second World War, the aircraft were extensively deployed for surveillance over the Black Sea. After being replaced by British Blenheims and Beauforts in 1944, the Martin 139WTs served as backup aircraft until 1946, when twelve of the sixteen remaining aircraft were still operational.

== Legacy ==
At the time of its creation, the B-10B was so advanced that General Henry H. Arnold described it as the airpower wonder of its day. It was half again as fast as any biplane bomber, and faster than any contemporary fighter. The B-10 began a revolution in bomber design, making existing bombers completely obsolete.

Rapid advances in bomber design in the late 1930s meant that the B-10 was eclipsed by the time the United States entered World War II. The Model 139s in combat in China and South East Asia suffered the same disadvantages as the other early war medium bombers, i.e. not enough armor and guns, while it could not outrun the latest fighters.

An abortive effort to modernize the design, the Martin Model 146, was entered into a USAAC long-distance bomber design competition in 1934–5. The bomber came in a strong second place and was bested by only the Boeing B-17 in range and endurance. However, it had a higher ceiling of 28,500 ft (8,700 m), was only 2 mph (3 km/h) slower, and carried 313 lb (142 kg) less in bombs than the Boeing, at over half the cost. Nonetheless, the design was seen as a dead end, and the third-place contender, the Douglas B-18, was selected instead.

== Variants ==
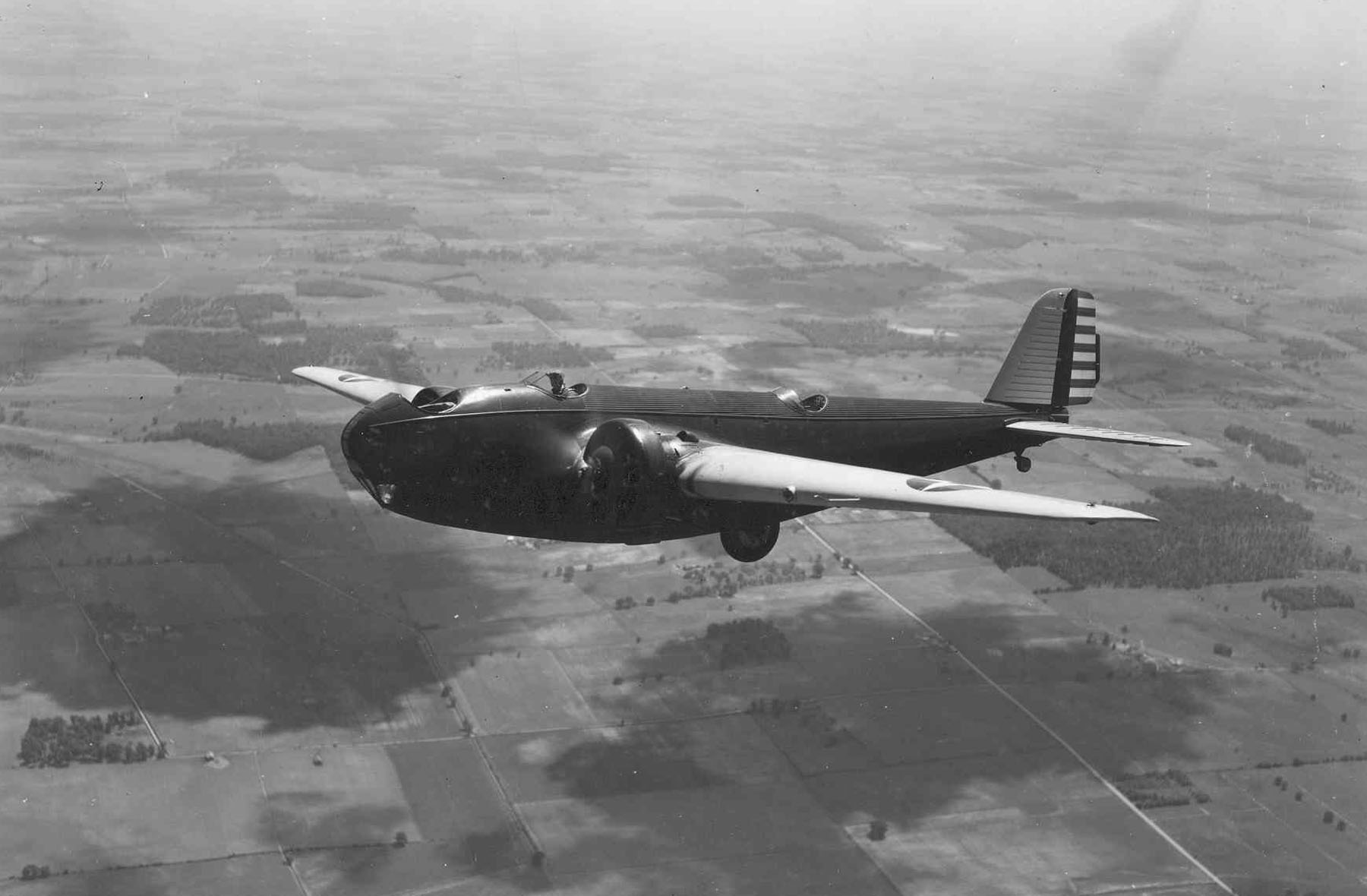
Martin XB-907

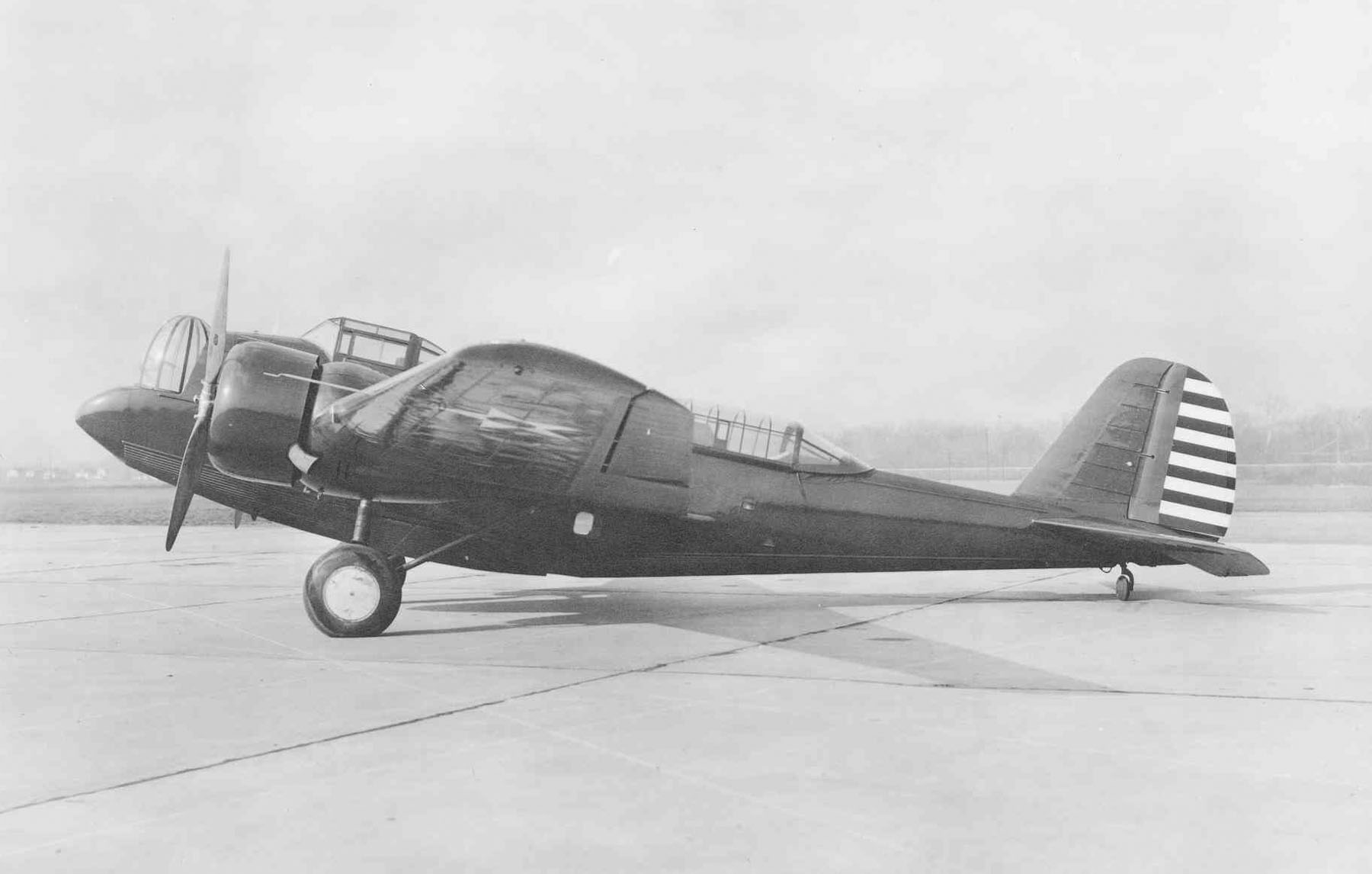
Martin YB-10

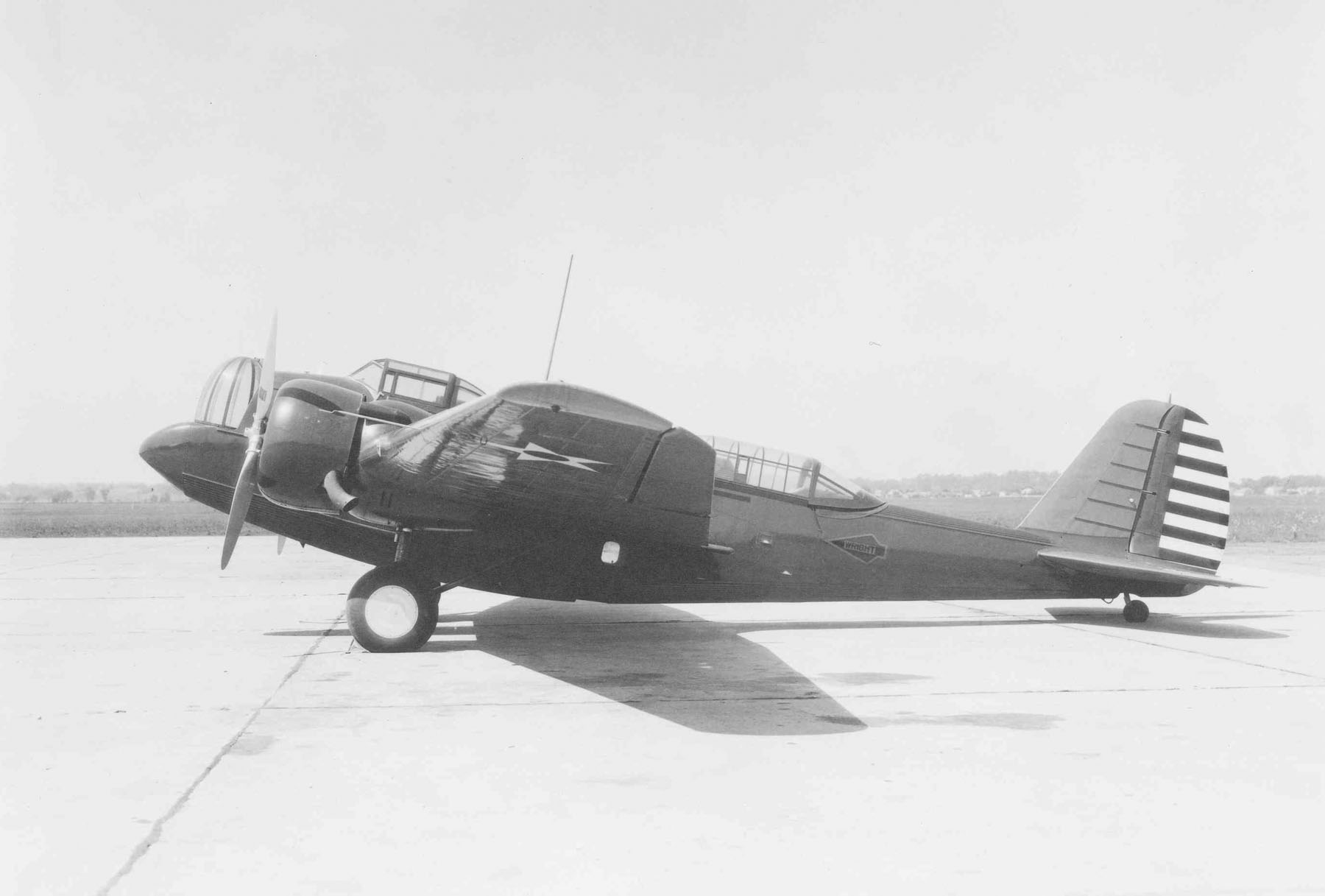
Martin B-12

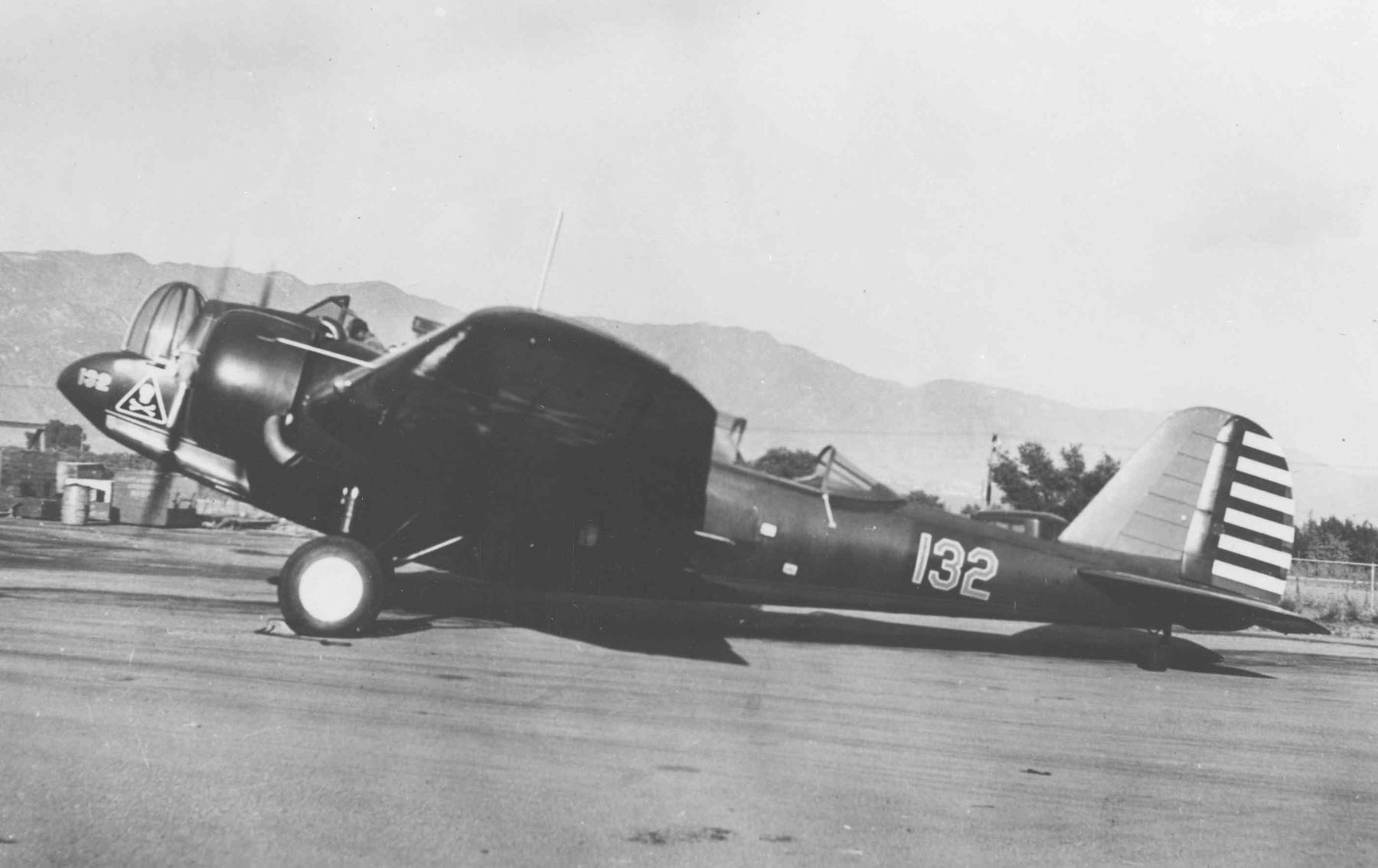
Martin B-12A

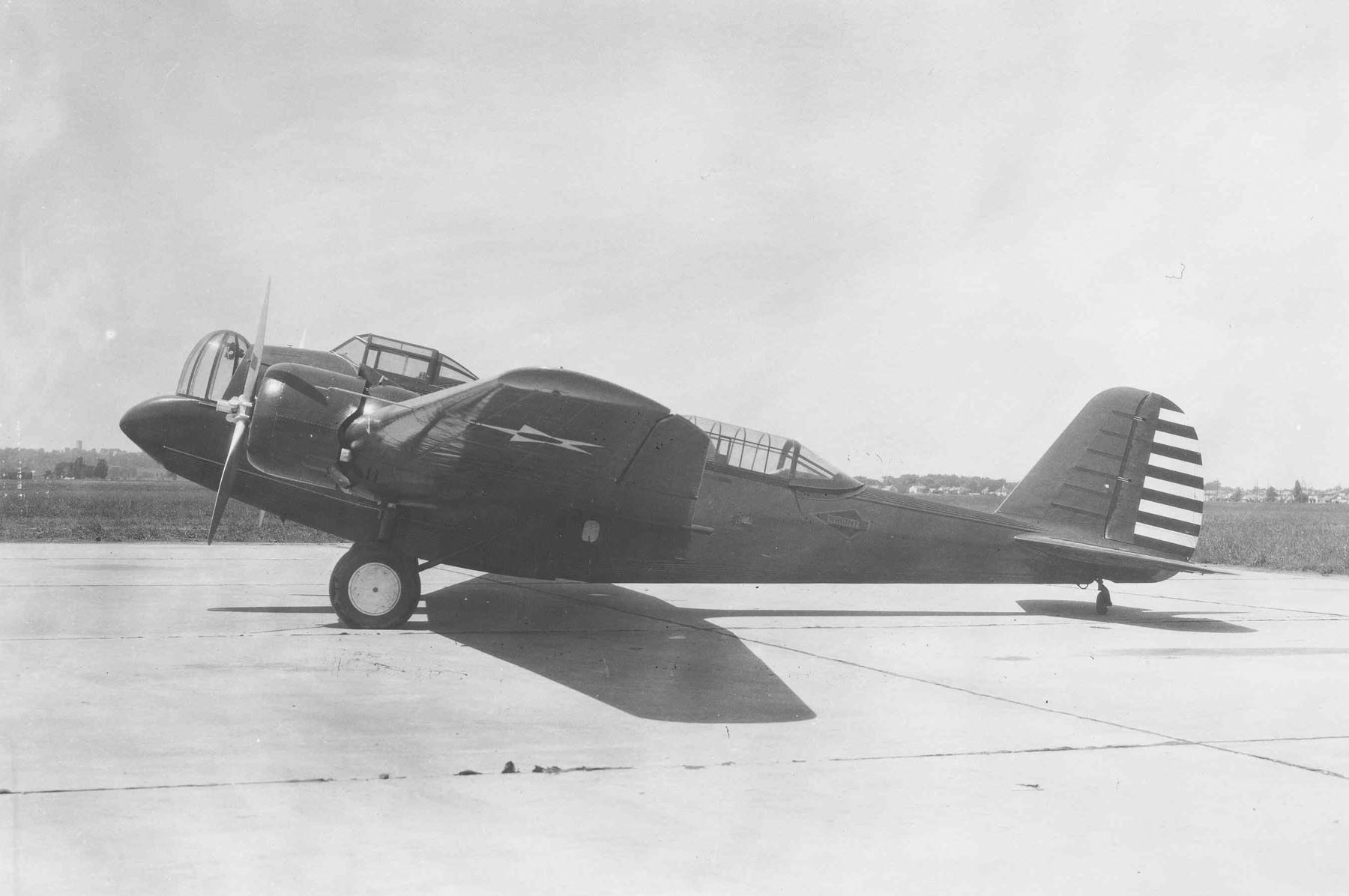
Martin XB-14

=== Martin Model 123 ===
Private venture of Martin company, predecessor of the XB-10, served as prototype for the series, one built.

XB-907
US Army designation for the Model 123 in evaluation, with open cockpits and two Wright SR-1820-E, delivered April 1932.
XB-907A
Modified XB-907 after Martin returned it to U.S. Army for further operational trials, with larger wingspan and two Wright R-1820-19.
XB-10
Designation of the prototype when purchased by the United States Army Air Corps; modified XB-907A with enclosed cockpits and turret and single strut landing gear.

=== Martin Model 139, 139A and 139B ===
Army Air Corps versions, 165 built.

YB-10
Model 139A, test and production version of the XB-10 with crew reduced to three members, and two 675 hp (503 kW) R-1820-25, 14 built, some flown temporarily as float planes.
YB-10A
The YB-10A was different from a YB-10 only in its engines. It used Wright R-1820-31 turbo-supercharged radials, allowing it to attain speeds of 236 mph (380 km/h). This made it the fastest aircraft of the B-10 series. Despite this advantage, only one was built, as a test aircraft.
B-10
According to one source, two additional aircraft ordered in 1936.
B-10B
Model 139, main production version with two 775 hp (578 kW) R-1820-33 engines, 105 built, delivered August 1936.
B-10M
According to one source this was, these were B-10Bs converted as target tugs. According to Martin's own archive, this was the designation of the YB-10 after testing, then used for airmail and Alaska missions, 13 of the 14 built were still in service in April 1940.
RB-10MA
One former NEIAF Model 139WH-3A model impressed in July 1942 and flown from Australia to the United States.
YB-12
Model 139B. With 250 or 500 US gallons (950 or 1,890 L) flotation chambers for safety on overwater flights, and two Pratt & Whitney R-1690-11 "Hornet" radial engines. These 775 hp (578 kW) engines gave similar performance to those on the B-10B (218 mph (351 km/h)), seven built, five still in service in April 1940.
(Y)B-12A
The production version of the YB-12 with provision for a 365 US gal (1,380 L) fuel tank in the bomb bay, giving the B-12A a combat range of 1,240 mi (2,000 km), 25 built, 23 still in service in April 1940.
YB-13
Re-engined version of the YB-10 powered by two 700 hp (520 kW) Pratt & Whitney R-1860-17 Hornet B radial engines. Ten were on order but cancelled before production started, not built.
XB-14
To test the new 900 hp (670 kW) Pratt & Whitney YR-1830-9 "Twin Wasp" radial engines, one built which was converted back to YB-12 after testing.
A-15
Proposed attack variant of the YB-10 with two 750 hp (560 kW) R-1820-25 engines, was never built. The contract fell to the A-14 Shrike.
YO-45
With two 750 hp (560 kW) Wright R-1820-17, proposed high-speed observation role, one B-10 was beginning to be converted in 1934 and another in 1935 but both were stopped before being completed and were converted back into B-10s.

=== Model 139W and 166 ===
The export versions, 100 built (182 including the Model 166, see below).

Model 139WA
Martin demonstrator for Argentina, later sold to Argentine Navy.
Model 139WAA
Export version for Argentine Army, 22 built, delivered April 1938.
Model 139WAN
Export version for the Argentine Navy, 12 built, delivered November 1937.
Model 139WC and WC-2
Export version for China, six and three built, delivered in February and August 1937.
Model 139WH
Export version for the Netherlands, used in the Netherlands East Indies. Thirteen WH-1s, powered by 770 hp (570 kW) Cyclone GR-1820-F53 engines delivered from December 1936, followed by 26 WH-2s, with 875 hp (652 kW) GR-1820-G3 engines, delivered 1938.
Model 139WR
Single demonstrator to the Soviet Union.
Model 139WSM and WSM-2
Export version for Siam, three and three built, delivered in March and April 1937. Locally designated B.Th.3 (Thai: บ.ท.๓).
Model 139WSP
Proposed license built version to be built by CASA of Spain, production blocked by U.S. State Department.
Model 139WT
Export version for Turkey, 20 built, delivered September 1937.

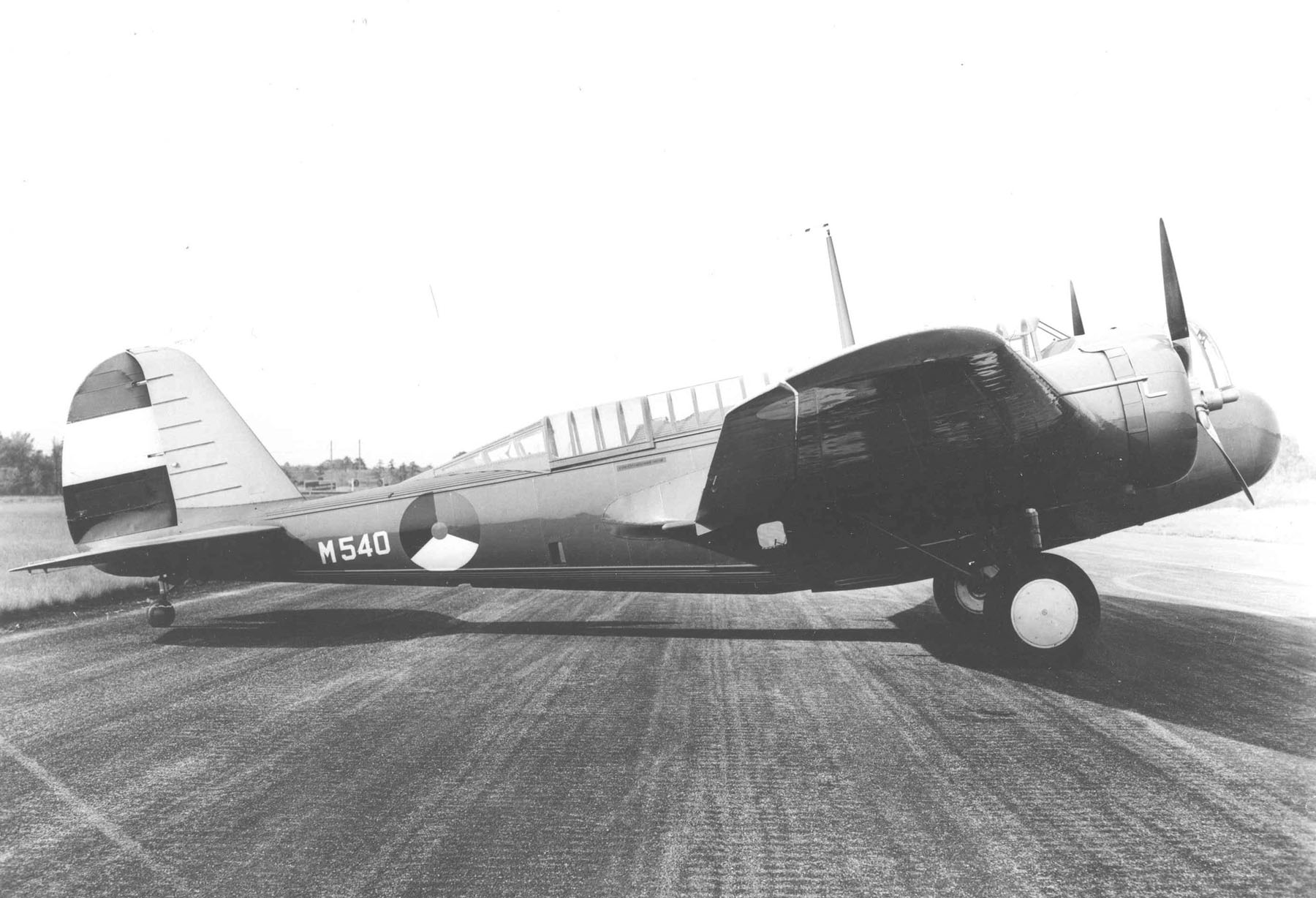
Side view of Dutch Martin Model 166

Model 166

Final version, a.k.a. 139WH-3 and 139WH-3A, 82 built.

Export version for the Netherlands, used in the Netherlands East Indies. Redesigned wings, nose and single 'glass house' canopy, bomb shackles between engines and fuselage, and better engines. The WH-3 had two 900 hp (670 kW) R-1820-G5 (40 built, delivered September 1938), the WH-3A had two 1,000 hp (750 kW) R-1820-G-105A (42 built, delivered March 1940). With the bomb shackles, the bomb load could be doubled for a shorter range. A total of 121 of all types were built for the Dutch.

== Operators ==
Argentina

- Army Aviation Service received 22 Model 139WAA aircraft, plus 1 fuselage for training.
- Argentine Navy – The Argentine Naval Aviation received 12 Model 139WAN and 1 Model 139WA aircraft.

China

- Chinese Nationalist Air Force ordered nine Martin 139s (six Model 139WC-1 and three Model 139WC-2), which were delivered in 1936 and 1937.

The Netherlands

- Royal Netherlands East Indies Army Air Force

Philippine Commonwealth

- Philippine Army Air Corps

Thailand

- Royal Thai Air Force received six Model 139W aircraft in April 1937 and used them during the French-Thai War of 1940–41, and during the 1942 invasion of Burma. It was given a further nine ex-Dutch aircraft by the Japanese in 1942. They remained in service until 1949.

Turkey

- Turkish Air Force received 20 Model 139W aircraft in September 1937.

Soviet Union

- Soviet Air Force bought one aircraft for evaluation.

United States

- United States Army Air Corps

== Surviving aircraft ==
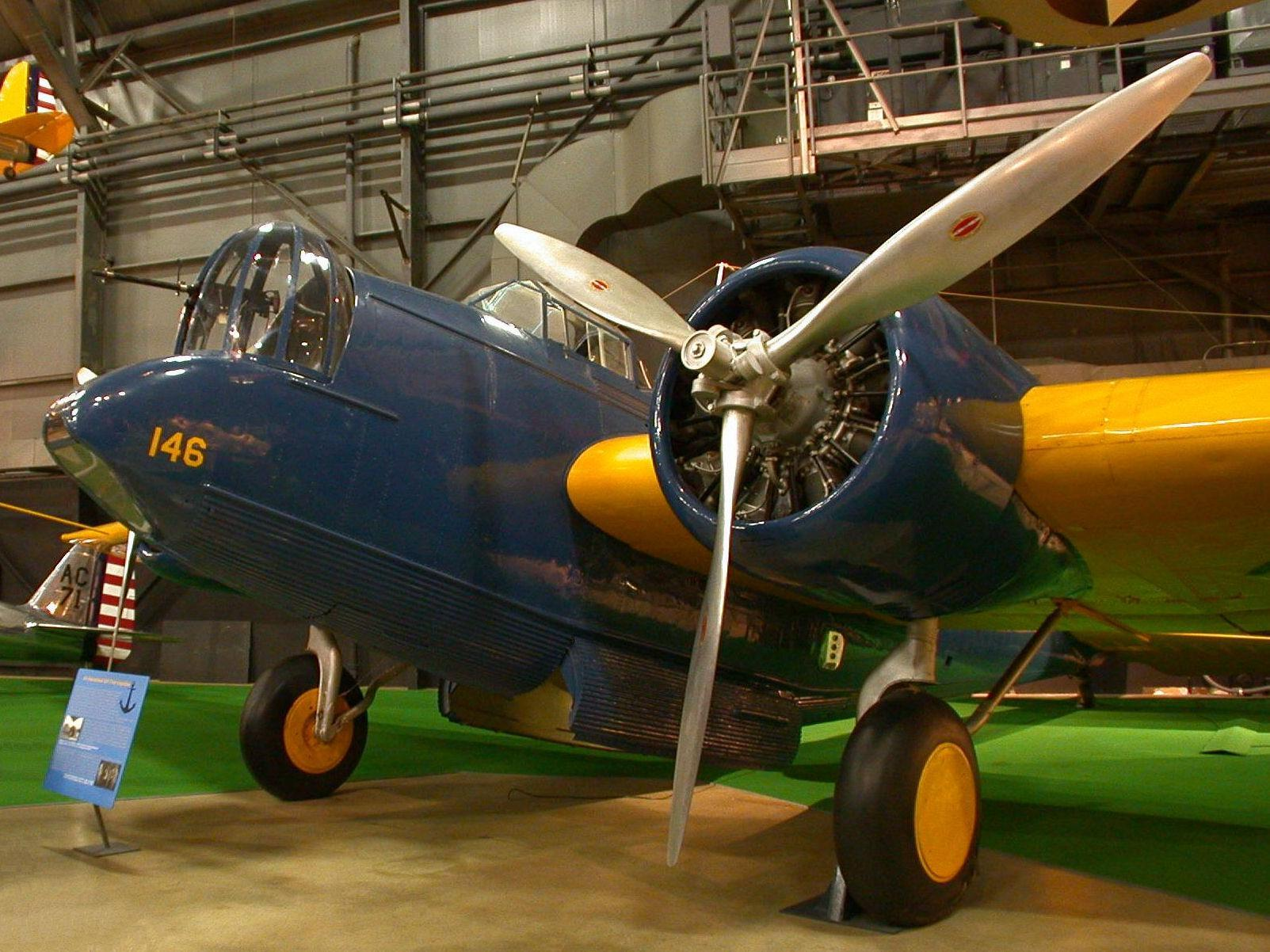
Ex-Argentine model 139WAA at the National Museum of the United States Air Force painted as a USAAC B-10

- The only surviving complete example is on display at the National Museum of the United States Air Force at Wright-Patterson Air Force Base near Dayton, Ohio. The aircraft is painted as a B-10 used in the 1934 Alaskan Flight but was a Martin 139WAA export version sold to Argentina in 1938. The aircraft was restored by the 96th Maintenance Squadron (Mobile), Air Force Reserve, at Kelly Air Force Base, Texas, in 1973–1976, and placed on display in 1976.
- The wreck of a crashed Dutch Martin 166WH-3 in East Kalimantan, Indonesia was rediscovered during an expedition by local newspaper Berau Post in early August 2018, based on local villagers' story of a crashed aircraft on top of a mountain. The wreck is located on Gunung Besar, Long Keluh Village, Kelay District, Berau Regency. Large parts of the wreck, such as the two engines, mid and rear fuselage, tail and elevators, and the right wing are still extant at the time of the expedition. According to a local villager, parts of the wreck have been looted by locals for decades. The aircraft's number, "M-574", was still visible amidst the moss in the wreck. The "M-574" was reported missing during a mission over southeast Dutch Borneo on 5 January 1941.
- Various parts of crashed B-10s, such as turrets and wings, were retrieved from the jungle of Borneo and were on display in the Militaire Luchtvaart Museum (Military Aviation Museum) at Soesterberg, the Netherlands. Since the closure of the MLM, they are stored with the Nationaal Militair Museum, located on the former Soesterberg Air Base.

== Specifications (B-10B) ==
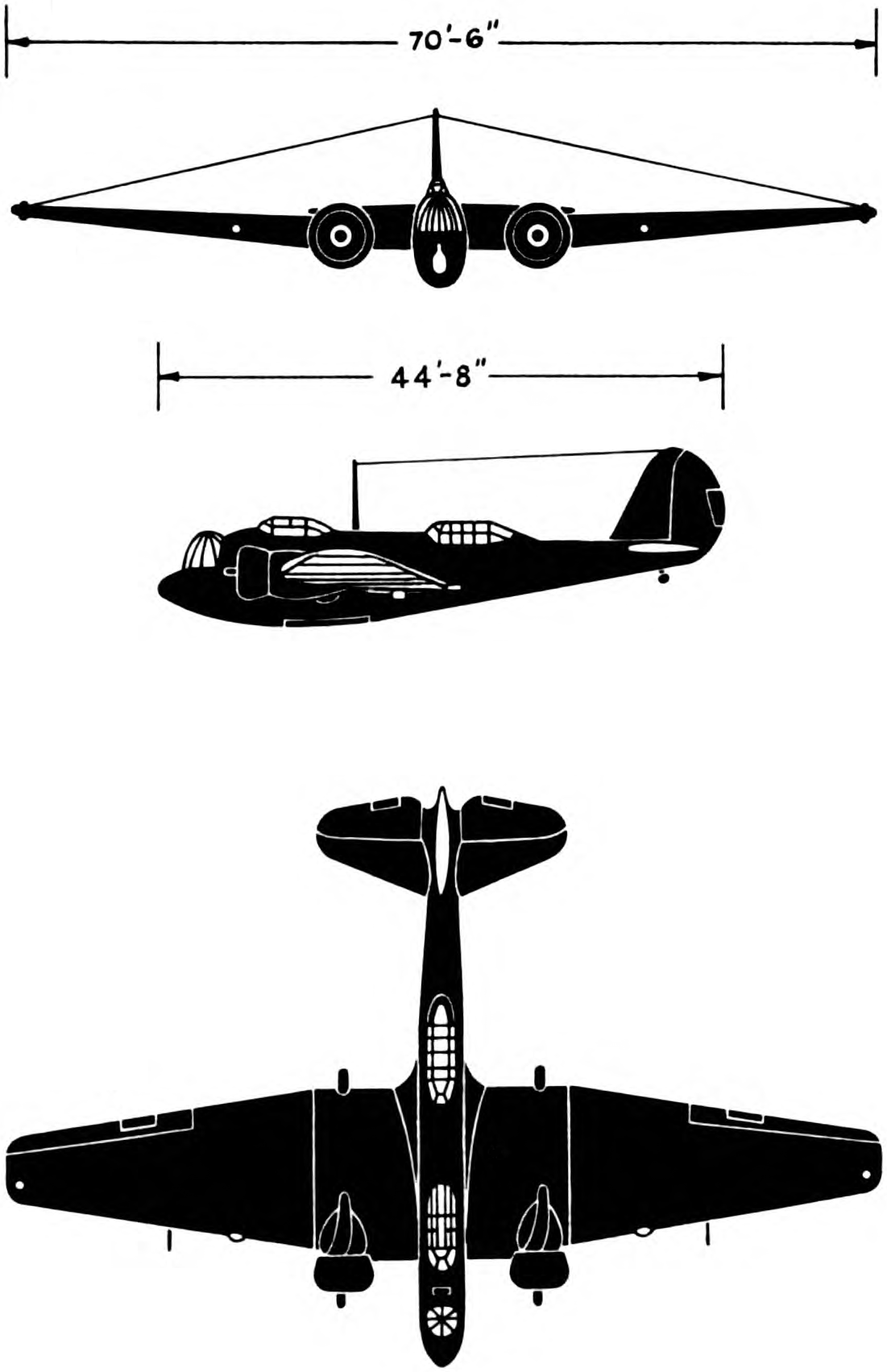
3-view silhouette of the Martin B-10

Data from United States Military Aircraft Since 1909.

General characteristics

- Crew: 4
- Length: 44 ft 9 in (13.64 m)
- Wingspan: 70 ft 6 in (21.49 m)
- Height: 15 ft 5 in (4.70 m)
- Wing area: 678 sq ft (63.0 m^{2})
- Empty weight: 9,681 lb (4,391 kg)
- Gross weight: 14,700 lb (6,668 kg)
- Max takeoff weight: 16,400 lb (7,439 kg)
- Powerplant: 2 × Wright R-1820-33 Cyclone (F-3) 9-cylinder air-cooled radial piston engines, 775 hp (578 kW) each
- Propellers: 3-bladed variable-pitch propellers

Performance

- Maximum speed: 213 mph (343 km/h, 185 kn)
- Cruise speed: 193 mph (311 km/h, 168 kn)
- Range: 1,240 mi (2,000 km, 1,080 nmi)
- Service ceiling: 24,200 ft (7,400 m)
- Wing loading: 21.7 lb/sq ft (106 kg/m^{2})
- Power/mass: 0.105 hp/lb (0.173 kW/kg)

Armament

- Guns: 3 × 0.300 in (7.62 mm) Browning machine guns
- Bombs: 2,260 lb (1,025 kg)

== See also ==
Aircraft of comparable role, configuration, and era

- Boeing Y1B-9
- Tupolev SB

Related lists

- List of bomber aircraft
- List of military aircraft of the United States
- List of aircraft of World War II

== Sources ==
- Andersson, Lennart (2008). Encyclopedia of Aircraft and Aviation in China until 1949. Taipei, ROC: AHS of ROC. ISBN 978-957-28533-3-7.
- Bridgwater, H.C. and Peter Scott. Combat Colours Number 4: Pearl Harbor and Beyond, December 1941 to May 1942. Luton, Bedfordshire, UK: Guideline Publications, 2001. ISBN 0-9539040-6-7.
- Casius, Gerald. "Batavia's Big Sticks." Air Enthusiast, Issue Twenty-two, August–November 1983, pp. 1–20. Bromley, Kent, UK: Pilot Press Ltd, 1983. ISSN 0143-5450.
- "Collier Trophy Is Presented to Martin By Roosevelt for New Airplane Design." New York Times, 1 June 1933.
- Eden, Paul and Soph Moeng, eds. The Complete Encyclopedia of World Aircraft. London: Amber Books Ltd., 2002. ISBN 0-7607-3432-1.
- Fenby, Jonathan (2009). Chiang Kai Shek: China's Generalissimo and the Nation He Lost. Da Capo Press. ISBN 978-0786739844.
- Fitzsimons, Bernard, ed. The Illustrated Encyclopedia of the 20th Century Weapons and Warfare. New York: Purnell & Sons Ltd., 1969, First edition 1967. ISBN 0-8393-6175-0.
- Glenn L. Martin Aviation Museum. Martin Aircraft Specifications.
- Gravermoen, David D. B-10 - The Martin Bomber. Spartanburg: Dakar Publishing ISBN 978-0996993203.
- Jackson, Robert. The Encyclopedia of Military Aircraft. London: Parragon Publishing, 2003. ISBN 1-4054-2465-6.
- Ledet, Michel (April 2002). "Des avions alliés aux couleurs japonais" [Allied Aircraft in Japanese Colors]. Avions: Toute l'Aéronautique et son histoire (in French) (109): 17–21. ISSN 1243-8650.
- Ledet, Michel (May 2002). "Des avions alliés aux couleurs japonais". Avions: Toute l'Aéronautique et son histoire (in French) (110): 16–23. ISSN 1243-8650.
- Li, Xiaobing; Li, Hongshan, eds. (1998). China and the United States: A New Cold War History. University Press of America. ISBN 9780761809784.
- Oktorino, Nino (2019). Duel Para Elang - Pertempuran Udara di Atas Hindia Belanda (in Indonesian). Jakarta: PT Elex Media Komputindo. ISBN 9786230000997.
- Shores, Christopher; Cull, Brian and Yasuho Izawa. Bloody Shambles: Volume One: The Drift to War to the Fall of Singapore. London: Grub Street, 1992. ISBN 0-948817-50-X
- Stille, Mark (2020). Malaya & Dutch East Indies 1941–42: Japan's air power shocks the world (Air Campaign, 19). Osprey Publishing. ISBN 978-1472840592.
- Swanborough, F. Gordon and Peter M. Bowers. United States Military Aircraft Since 1909. New York: Putnam, 1964. ISBN 0-85177-816-X.
- Taylor, John W. R. "Martin B-10". Combat Aircraft of the World from 1909 to the Present. New York: G.P. Putnam's Sons, 1969. ISBN 0-425-03633-2.
- Xu, Guangqiu (2001). War Wings: The United States and Chinese Military Aviation, 1929–1949. Greenwood Press. ISBN 9780313320040.
- Underwood, J. Barton (November 1941). "America Plays Its Part in the Chinese Air Force". Flying and Popular Aviation. Vol. 29, no. 5. ISSN 0015-4806.
- Young, Edward M. "France's Forgotten Air War". Air Enthusiast Issue Twenty Five, August–November 1984, pp. 22–33. Bromley, Kent: Pilot Press. ISSN 0143-5450.
