= General Magruder =

General Magruder may refer to:

- Bruce Magruder (1882–1953), U.S. Army major general
- Carter B. Magruder (1900–1988), U.S. Army general
- John Magruder (general, born 1887) (1887–1958), U.S. Army brigadier general
- John B. Magruder (1807–1871), Confederate States Army major general
- Marshall Magruder (1885–1956), U.S. Army brigadier general
