= Martin 146 =

Model 146
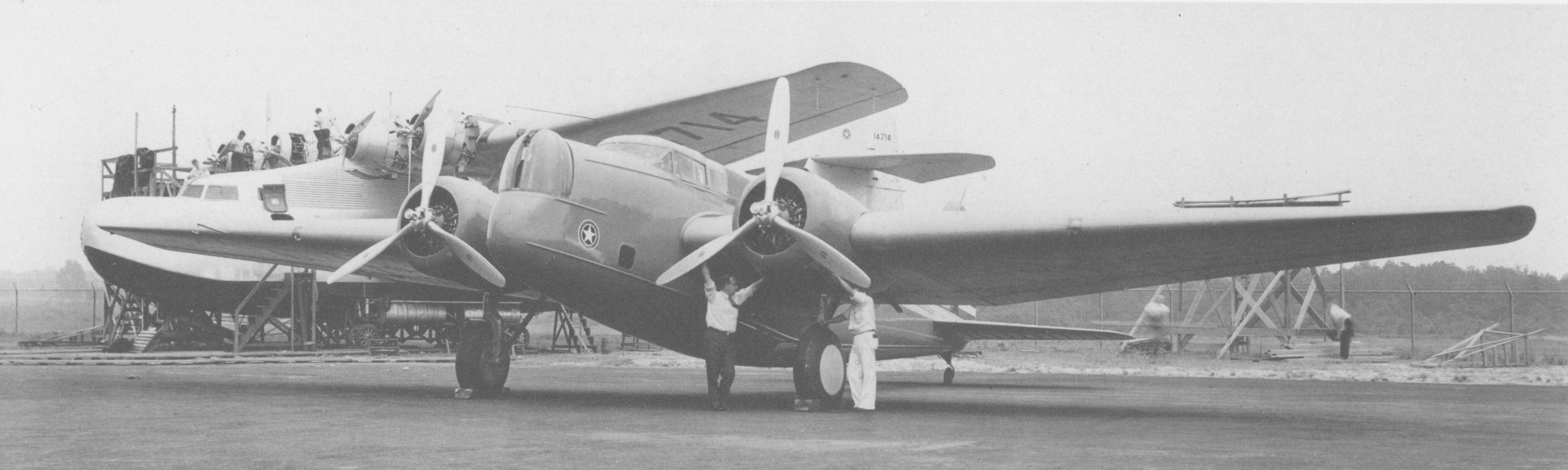
- Martin Model 146 during competition c. 1935, USAF photo

General information
- Type: Heavy bomber
- Manufacturer: Glenn L. Martin Company
- Status: Experimental prototype
- Primary user: United States Army Air Corps (intended)
- Number built: 1

History
- Manufactured: 1935
- First flight: 1935
- Developed from: Martin B-10

The Martin Model 146 was an unsuccessful American bomber design that lost a 1934–1935 bomber design competition to the prototype for the Douglas B-18 Bolo (which was itself soon thereafter supplanted by the B-17 Flying Fortress).

== Design and development ==
Although generally satisfied with the speed and bombload of the Martin B-10, the United States Army Air Corps expressed a requirement for a bomber with long range. Two competitions were held in 1934–35: one for fast bombers capable of flying 2,200 miles (3,500 km), and a second for the experimental prototype of a 5,000-mile (8,000 km) bomber.

The Martin 146 was built for the first competition, competing with the Boeing Model 299 (later the B-17) and Douglas DB-1 (later the B-18). Two versions were submitted for the competition, the Model 146 (actual aircraft) and the Model 146A (design only). The only significant difference between the two was the planform, the 146 center section was rectangular with the outer wing being tapered while the 146A had a constant taper.

The Model 146 bore a striking resemblance to the earlier Martin B-10, with the same configurations of turret and cockpits and even the same two Wright R-1820 Cyclone engines – albeit with 33% more power than the 600 hp Cyclones of the original B-10. The biggest differences between this aircraft and the Martin 139 (B-10) was that it was wider, allowing the pilot and co-pilot to sit side by side and was equipped with Fowler flaps, the first large aircraft equipped with them.

The Model 146 was not successful but it led the Martin company to begin research into contemporary aviation technology. Some offshoots included the innovative Martin 145 proposed for the long-range bomber competition as well as the early studies that would lead to the Model 179 (later to emerge as the wartime Martin B-26). The aircraft was eventually returned to the factory and scrapped.

== Specifications (Model 146) ==
Data from Martin 146 Specifications

General characteristics

- Crew: 4
- Length: 52 ft 0 in (15.85 m)
- Wingspan: 75 ft 1 in (22.89 m)
- Height: 15 ft 5 in (4.70 m)
- Wing area: 729 sq ft (67.7 m^{2})
- Gross weight: 16,000 lb (7,257 kg)
- Max takeoff weight: 17,100 lb (7,756 kg)
- Powerplant: 2 × Wright R-1820-G5 Cyclone 9-cylinder air-cooled radial piston engines, 800 hp (600 kW) each
- Propellers: 3-bladed constant-speed propellers

Performance

- Maximum speed: 234 mph (377 km/h, 203 kn)
- Cruise speed: 204 mph (328 km/h, 177 kn)
- Range: 1,237 mi (1,991 km, 1,075 nmi)
- Service ceiling: 28,500 ft (8,700 m)
- Wing loading: 21.95 lb/sq ft (107.2 kg/m^{2})
- Power/mass: 0.100 hp/lb (0.164 kW/kg)

Armament

- Guns: 3 × .30 in (7.62 mm) Browning machine guns
- Bombs: 2,260 lb (1,030 kg)

== See also ==
Related development

- Martin B-10

Aircraft of comparable role, configuration, and era

- Boeing B-17 Flying Fortress
- Douglas B-18 Bolo

Related lists

- List of bomber aircraft
- List of military aircraft of the United States
