= Peyton M. Magruder =

American aircraft designer

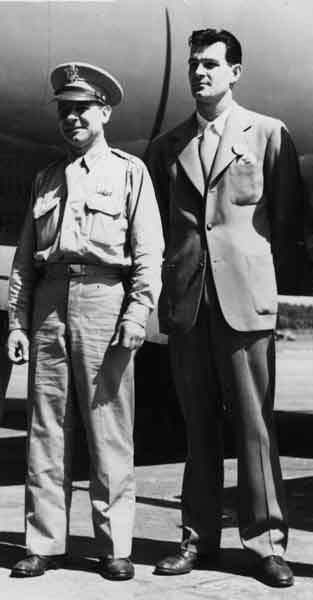
Jimmy Doolittle (left) and Peyton M. Magruder in front of a B-26 Marauder

Peyton M. Magruder (October 19, 1911, Fort Riley, Kansas – January 19, 1982, Marathon, Florida) was an aircraft designer best known for his design of the Glenn L. Martin Company's B-26 Marauder.

== Early life ==
Magruder was born into a military family; his father was Brigadier General Marshall Magruder. His early life was a succession of moves from one post to another due to his father's career. This would take him to Manila, Yokohama, Hawaii, and several other posts. Because of his father's career he had to attend four different high schools. However he still won appointments to both Annapolis and West Point.

Magruder chose to attend the Naval Academy in Annapolis which he entered in 1930. He studied less — and partied more — than most, but still remained in the upper part of his class. He pole-vaulted for the track team, was a member of the swim team, and once won $350 in bets by running five miles (8 km) in 29 minutes and 37 seconds. He resigned during his senior year of 1934 partially due to a scandal which has now become a part of Naval Academy lore, and partially in order to apply for enlistment in the Army's aviation school. At that time the Army would not give up slots for Navy officers and cadets because the Navy had its own air school.

In order to improve his chances of acceptance Magruder signed up with one of the National Guard's air units, and enrolled in the Aeronautical Engineering curriculum at the University of Alabama. However, before completion of his one year at Alabama he was engaged to be married and looking for work.

== Early career ==
Magruder soon obtained a position at the Naval Aircraft Factory in Philadelphia, through an encounter with Adm. Ernest J. King, who was then chief of the Navy Bureau of Aeronautics. Magruder's family had been neighbors with King in Newport, Rhode Island while Adm. King and his father studied at the Naval War College. Magruder stayed at the NAF for two years, before moving in 1937 to a job at Glenn L. Martin Company, now Lockheed-Martin.

== Design of the B-26 ==
Glenn L. Martin assigned the then 27-year-old aeronautical engineer the title of Project Engineer, and the task of designing Model 179 according to Army Air Corps specifications issued in January 1939. This model would later become known as the B-26 Marauder. Design of the Model 179 was completed in June 1939. On July 5, 1939, the Model 179 was submitted to a review board and was rated the highest of those submitted. On August 10, 1939, the Army issued a contract for 201 Model 179s under the designation B-26.

== Later life ==
Peyton M. Magruder would later in life be president for International Chemical Corporation.
