= Marshall Magruder =

United States Army general

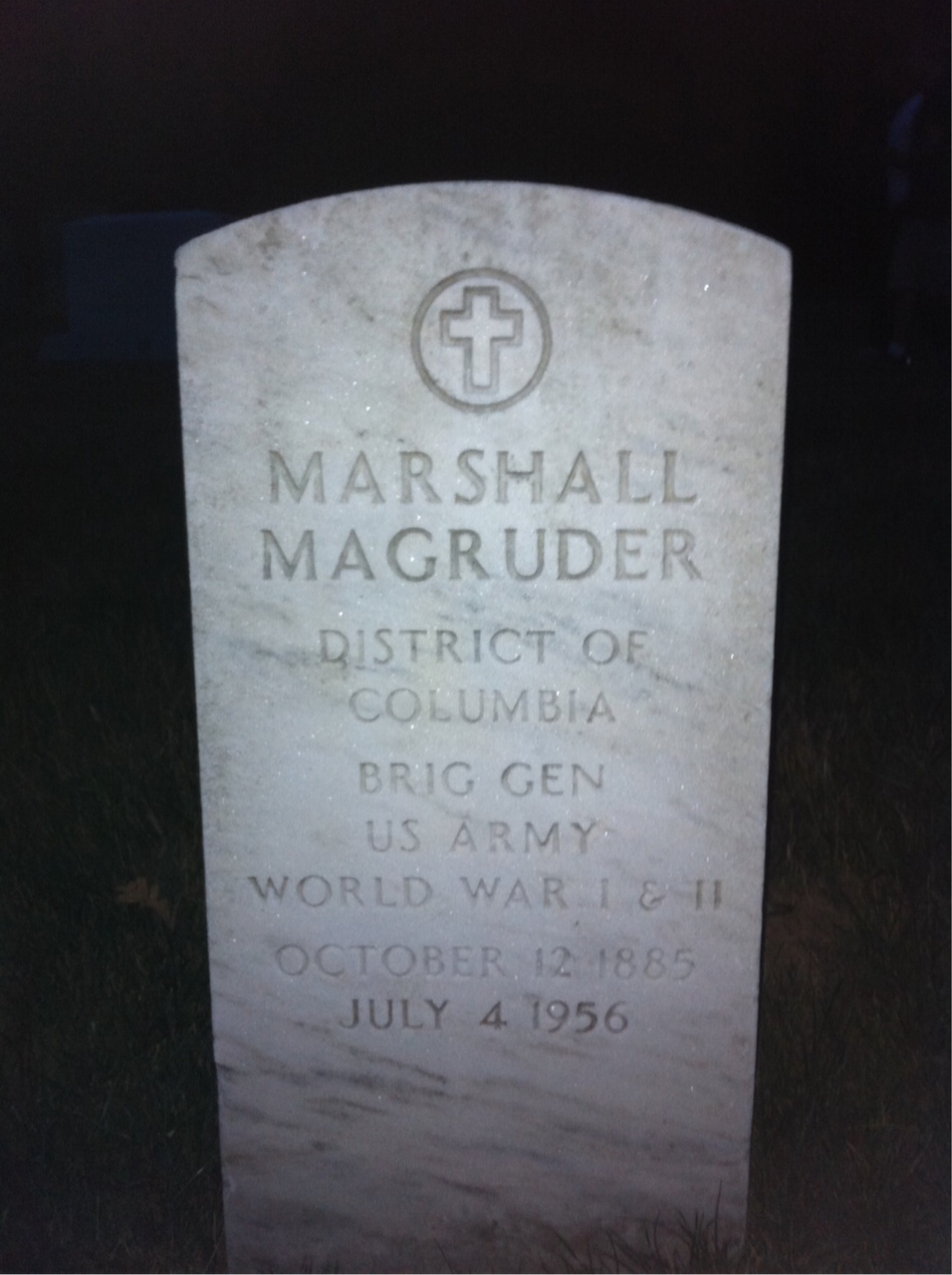
Grave at Arlington National Cemetery

Brigadier General Marshall Magruder (12 October 1885 – 4 July 1956) was born in Washington, D.C. He served in both World War I and World War II. His son was noted aircraft designer Peyton M. Magruder. BG Magruder retired from the US Army in 1946. He was buried at Arlington National Cemetery in Section 30, Site 1092.

== Career ==
- 11 June 1935- 28 August 1935 Commanding Officer 13th Field Artillery Regiment
- 1939–1940 Commanding Officer Armored Cavalry Regiment
- 1942–1943 Commanding Officer 14th Field Artillery Brigade
- 1943–1946 Member of War Department Manpower Board
