= List of Flying Tigers pilots =

Following is a complete list of American Volunteer Group (Flying Tigers) pilots. The AVG was operational from December 20, 1941, to July 14, 1942. The press continued to apply the Flying Tigers name to later units, but pilots of those organizations are not included.

The victories of enemy aircraft in air-to-air combat shown below are "confirmed" claims as recorded in AVG records, unearthed by aviation historian Frank Olynyk. The Chinese government paid the pilots a bonus of $500 for each enemy aircraft destroyed, whether in the air or on the ground.

Aces while Flying Tigers are in bold.

Name	Air-to-air victories	Bonuses	Notes
Adkins, Frank W.	1	1	After the unit was disbanded, Adkins and other Tigers pilots joined the China National Aviation Corporation, flying supplies over the Hump from India to China.
Armstrong, John Dean			Killed on September 8, 1941 during a practice dogfight when he collided with J. Gilpin Bright.
Atkinson, Peter W.			Killed in a crash when the "propeller governor failed on his P-40".
Bacon, Noel	3	3.5	
Bartelt, Percy	5	7	
Bartling, William	5	7.27	
Baugh, Marion F.			
Bernsdorf, Donald R.			
Bishop, Lewis Sherman	2.2 or 5.2	5.2	On May 17, 1942, vice squadron leader Bishop had to bail out during a bombing run when a bomb he dropped exploded prematurely and disabled his airplane. The wind took him into French Indochina, where he was captured by the Vichy French. They turned over to the Japanese, who tortured him for several months. In May 1945, he escaped from a moving train after his POW camp was evacuated.
Blackburn, John Ed III	2	2	
Bohman, Morris P.			
Bolster, Harry R.	1	2	After the unit was disbanded, Bolster and other Tigers pilots joined the China National Aviation Corporation, flying supplies over the Hump from India to China.
Bond, Charles	7	8.77	He was the first Flying Tiger to paint a shark's mouth on the nose of his airplane.
Boyington, Gregory "Pappy"	2	3.5	Boyington always claimed that he shot down six in the air, a claim accepted by the Marine Corps. In any case, he was awarded the Medal of Honor for his post-Tigers achievements.
Bright, John Gilpin	3	6	
Brouk, Robert R.	3.5	3.5	
Brown, Carl K.	0	0.27	The last surviving pilot of the Flying Tigers, Brown died in 2017, three months short of his 100th birthday.
Burgard, George T.	10	10.79	
Cavanah, Herbert R.			
Christman, Allen Bert			A cartoonist before the war, he personalized the noses of the P-40s of the "Panda Bear" squadron with cartoons and caricatures. His airplane was hit and he was killed while parachuting in 1942.
Cole, Thomas J.	1	1	Previously a Consolidated PBY Catalina pilot, Cole was killed by anti-aircraft fire on January 30, 1942, while mistakenly strafing friendly forces; his plane exploded and his body was never recovered.
Conant, Edwin S.			
Cook, Elmer J.			
Criz, Albert			
Croft, John S.			
Cross, James	0	0.27	
Dean, John J.	3	3.27	After the unit was disbanded, Dean and other Tigers pilots joined the China National Aviation Corporation, flying supplies over the Hump from India to China.
Donovan, John Tyler	1	4	
Dupouy, Parker S.	3.5	3.5	
Farrell, John W.	1	1	
Fish, William H., Jr.			
Foshee, Ben Crum			Died on May 4, 1942, from injuries suffered in a raid on Paoshan in Yunnan Province, in China.
Geselbracht, Henry M., Jr.	0	1.5	
Gilbert, Henry G.			Gilbert, the youngest AVG pilot (age 22), was killed on December 23, 1941, the first Flying Tiger to die in combat. While 15 RAF pilots attacked the escort, he and 11 other Flying Tigers went after Japanese bombers on a nighttime raid on Rangoon. He hit two bombers, but was hit by cannon fire and crashed into the jungle below.
Goyette, Edgar T.			
Greene, Paul J.	2	2	
Groh, Clifford G.	2	2	After the unit was disbanded, Groh and other Tigers pilots joined the China National Aviation Corporation, flying supplies over the Hump from India to China.
Gunvordahl, Ralph N.	1	1	
Hall, Lester J.			
Hammer, Maax C.			Killed in a training accident, circumstances unknown.
Hastey, Raymond L.	1	1	
Haywood, Thomas C., Jr.	4 or 4.5	5.08	
Hedman, Robert P.	6	4.83	He became an "ace in a day" around Christmas Day, 1941. After the unit was disbanded, Hedman and other Tigers pilots joined the China National Aviation Corporation, flying supplies over the Hump from India to China. He later became one of the original partners in fellow Flying Tiger Robert Prescott's Flying Tiger Line.
Hennessy, John J.			
Hill, David Lee "Tex"	10.25, 12.25 or 12.75	11.25	A squadron leader, he was one of five Flying Tigers to join its successor, the United States Army Air Forces 23rd Fighter Group, where he downed an additional six Japanese airplanes.
Hodges, Fred S.	1	1	After the unit was disbanded, Hodges and other Tigers pilots joined the China National Aviation Corporation, flying supplies over the Hump from India to China.
Hoffman, Louis	0	0.27	
Houle, Leo J.			
Howard, James H.	2.33 or 6	6.33	Howard was one of six squadron leaders. He later became the only pilot in the European Theater to be awarded the Medal of Honor.
Hurst, Lynn A.			
Jernstedt, Kenneth A.	3	10.5	He and William Reed shared credit for 15 airplanes destroyed on the ground on one mission.
Jones, Thomas A.	1	4	He died on May 16, 1942, when he did not pull up in time from a practice dive.
Keeton, Robert B.	2	2.5	
Kelleher, John P.			
Knapp, Donald R.			
Kuykendall, Mathew or Matthew W.	1	1	
Laughlin, C. H.	2 or 5+	5.2	After the unit was disbanded, Laughlin and other Tigers pilots joined the China National Aviation Corporation, flying supplies over the Hump from India to China.
Lawlor, Frank L.	7	8.5	
Layher, Robert F.	0.33 or 2 shared	0.83	
Leibolt or Liebolt, Edward J.	0	0.27	
Little, Robert L.	10	10.55	Shot down and killed on May 22, 1942, during a bombing mission.
Loane, Ernest W.			After the unit was disbanded, Loane and other Tigers pilots joined the China National Aviation Corporation, flying supplies over the Hump from India to China. He later went to work for Robert Prescott (see below) and what eventually became the Flying Tiger Line.
McGarry, William D.	8	10.29	He was shot down in Thailand by Japanese anti-aircraft fire on March 24, 1942, and taken prisoner. He escaped after nearly three years and lived to be 74.
McGuire, Maurice G.			
McMillan, George B.	4.5	4.08	Vice Commander of the 3d Squadron ("Hells Angels"). He was recommissioned in the United States Army Air Forces as a major in 1943 and served as a test pilot at Eglin Army Airfield, Florida. He returned to China that same year serving as a P-38 pilot and commander of the 449th Fighter Squadron/51st Fighter Group, scoring four additional kills to become an ace. He was shot down and killed near Pingxiang, China on June 24, 1944, on his 53rd combat mission.
Mangleburg, Lacy F.			
Martin, Neil G.			
Merritt, Kenneth T.	1	1	Died when a landing aircraft crashed into a parked car in which he was sleeping on the night of January 7-8, 1942. Peter Wright was splashed with hydraulic fluid and landed awkwardly, resulting in the landing gear collapsing. His plane then skidded into a parked Chevrolet sedan; Wright survived, but Merritt was killed instantly.
Mickelson, Einar I.	1	0.27	After the unit was disbanded, Mickelson and other Tigers pilots joined the China National Aviation Corporation, flying supplies over the Hump from India to China.
Moss, Robert C.	2	4	After the unit was disbanded, Moss and other Tigers pilots joined the China National Aviation Corporation, flying supplies over the Hump from India to China.
Mott, Charles D.	0 or 2	2	
Neale, Robert H.	13	15.55	Top Flying Tigers ace and a squadron leader.
Newkirk, John	7	10.5	A squadron leader.
Older, Charles H.	10	10.08	After the war, he was eventually appointed a Los Angeles Superior Court judge and presided over the Charles Manson murder trial.
Olson, Arvid E., Jr.	1	1	A squadron leader.
Overend, Edmund F.	5	5.83	
Paxton, George L.			
Petach, John E., Jr.	3.98	3.98	On the ocean voyage to China, Petach became acquainted with Emma Jane Foster, one of the two nurses who sailed with and were members of the Flying Tigers; they married in China. With the Tigers were being absorbed by the US military, Petach was set to return home when he learned that volunteers were needed to help out for two weeks. He stayed. Though Tex Hill tried to give him safe missions, he was shot down and killed. Petach was the last of the AVG Flying Tigers to be killed in China, on July 10, 1942, 6 days after the group officially disbanded.
Power, Robert H.			
Prescott, Robert William	5.5 or 6	5.29	He founded the Flying Tiger Line, the first scheduled cargo airline in the United States.
Probst, Albert E.			
Raine, Robert James	3+ or 3.2	3.2	After the unit was disbanded, Raine and other Tigers pilots joined the China National Aviation Corporation, flying supplies over the Hump from India to China.
Rector, Edward F.	4.75	6.52	He was responsible for the first and the last Flying Tigers victory.
Reed, William Norman	3	10.5	He and Kenneth Jernstedt shared credit for 15 airplanes destroyed on the ground on one mission. He subsequently became an ace with six victories with the US Army Air Forces.
Ricketts, Freeman I.	1.2	1.2	
Rosbert, Camile Joseph	6	4.55	After the unit was disbanded, Rosbert and other Tigers pilots joined the China National Aviation Corporation, flying supplies over the Hump from India to China. Like several other Flying Tigers, he was one of the original partners in Robert Prescott's Flying Tiger Line.
Rossi, John Richard	6 or 6.25	6.29	
Rushton, Edwin H.			
Sandell, Robert J.	5	5.27	A squadron leader.
Sawyer, Charles W.	2	2.27	
Schiel, Frank, Jr.	4	7	
Shamblin, Arnold W.			
Shapard, Van Jr.	1	1	After the unit was disbanded, Shapard and other Tigers pilots joined the China National Aviation Corporation, flying supplies over the Hump from India to China.
Shilling, Eriksen E.	0	0.75	After the unit was disbanded, Shilling and other Tigers pilots joined the China National Aviation Corporation, flying supplies over the Hump from India to China.
Smith, Robert H.	5 or 5.25	5.5	
Smith, Robert T.	8.7, 8.9 or 9	8.73	
Smith, William C.			
Swindle, Estes T., Jr.			
Wallace, Stanley H.			
Walroth, Robert H.			
Watson, Eugene A.			
White, Richard			
Wolf, Fritz E.	4	2.27	
Wright, Allen M.			After the unit was disbanded, Wright and other Tigers pilots joined the China National Aviation Corporation, flying supplies over the Hump from India to China.
Wright, Peter	2.65	3.65	
Chik,Li Y.	3	4	

== See also ==
- Robert Lee Scott, Jr., who was allowed by Claire Chennault to fly some missions with the Tigers
