= Robert Little (Flying Tiger) =

American fighter ace

- Died: May 22, 1942; Salween River, China
- Military career
- Allegiance: United States
- Branch: United States Army Air Corps
- Units: 8th Pursuit Group; Flying Tigers
- Conflicts: World War II
- Awards: Distinguished Flying Cross; Distinguished Flying Cross (United Kingdom)

Robert Laing "Bob" Little (died May 22, 1942) was an American fighter pilot and double ace with the Flying Tigers, credited with 10, 10.5 or 10.55 victories.

He was a native of Spokane, Washington, and attended North Central High School in 1935 and 1936.

Little resigned from the United States Army Air Corps 8th Pursuit Group to join the Flying Tigers in the days before the United States entered World War II. He was one of the few Flying Tigers with prior experience with the Curtiss P-40 fighter, having logged 375 hours. In 1942, he was credited with downing Nakajima Ki-27 fighters on January 29 and February 6, 25 and 26, as well as a Nakajima Ki-43 fighter on April 8.

He was killed while on a ground attack mission at the Salween River Gorge south of Baoshan. Wingman R. H. Smith reported that Little was diving at the target when, at 1,000 feet (300 m) Smith heard an explosion, then saw flames and smoke coming from Little's left wing. With half the wing gone, the airplane went into a tight spin and struck the ground. Smith noted that he had seen no flak; Little may have been the unlucky victim of small arms fire from the ground triggering the premature detonation of one of his own bombs. Squadron leader Robert Neale stated, "Bob flew more missions over enemy territory than anybody else in the outfit. He never turned down a chance to fight. Bob was one of the most aggressive pilots in the AVG and a helluva good guy."

Little was awarded a British Distinguished Flying Cross and an American Distinguished Flying Cross.

== See also ==
- List of Flying Tigers pilots
- List of World War II flying aces
