= Robert T. Smith =

American World War II flying ace (1918–1995)

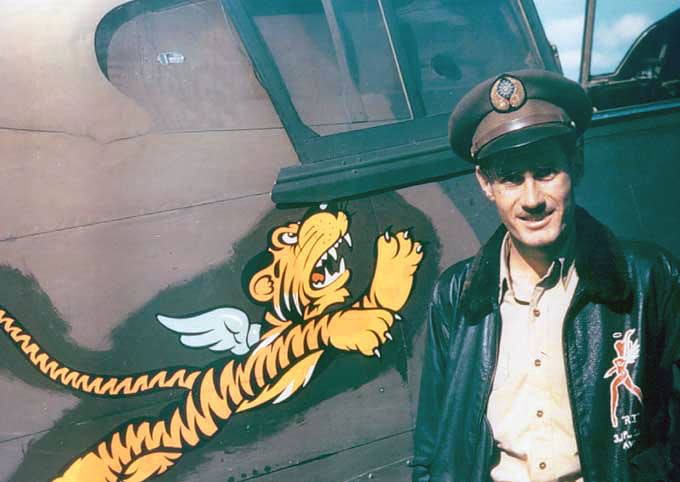
- Born: February 23, 1918; York, Nebraska, US
- Died: August 21, 1995 (aged 77); Van Nuys, California, US
- Military career
- Allegiance: United States
- Branch: United States Army Air Forces; United States Air Force Reserve
- Service years: 1939–1945; 1949–1966
- Rank: Lieutenant Colonel
- Nicknames: "R.T.", "Tadpole", "Bob"
- Service number: 0-395294
- Units: American Volunteer Group; 1st Air Commando Group
- Commands: 337th Fighter Squadron
- Conflicts: World War II: Burma campaign; China-Burma-India Theater
- Awards: Silver Star; Distinguished Flying Cross; Air Medal; Order of the Cloud and Banner with Special Cravat (China); Star Wing Medal (China); Distinguished Flying Cross (United Kingdom)
- Other work: TWA pilot Executive

Robert Tharp (R.T.) Smith (February 23, 1918 – August 21, 1995) was an American World War II fighter pilot and ace, credited with 8.7, 8.9 or 9 Japanese aircraft while fighting with the American Volunteer Group (Flying Tigers).

== Early life ==
He was born in York, Nebraska. His family moved to Red Cloud from Hooper, Nebraska in 1927 when his father, Earl W. Smith, was hired as Superintendent of Schools. He graduated Red Cloud High School in 1935. Smith attended the University of Nebraska before joining the United States Army Air Corps in 1939, midway through his senior year. Prior to the time he enrolled in the Air Corps, he worked for the Nebraska State Journal as a proof reader.

== Flight training ==
He received his primary flight training at the Allan Hancock College of Aeronautics at Santa Maria, California. During his training, he was given a couple of check rides with Robert L. Scott, author of God Is My Co-Pilot, who on May 17, 1942 flew as Smith's wingman on Scott's first combat mission in China. Smith completed basic training with Class 40-C at Randolph Field, Texas and advanced training at Brooks Field, Texas. He was commissioned a second lieutenant in June 1940, and returned to Randolph Field where his first assignment was as a basic flight instructor.

== American Volunteer Group ==
Smith resigned his commission in July 1941 in order to join Colonel Claire Lee Chennault's American Volunteer Group (AVG) as a "soldier of fortune" with the Nationalist Chinese Air Force. The Flying Tigers, as they were soon to be called, were in Burma training in Curtiss P-40s (actually Hawk Model 81-A-2s, or, as the British called them, Tomahawks) when Pearl Harbor was attacked on December 8, 1941 (December 7 in the United States).

R.T. Smith (sometimes called "Tadpole" after David Lee "Tex" Hill supplied the answer to a question someone posed to Smith, "What's the 'T' stand for?") saw his first combat action over Rangoon on December 23, 1941, when he was credited with shooting down 1.5 Mitsubishi Ki-21 "Sally" bombers, followed on Christmas Day with credit for two more Sallys and a fighter. Promoted to flight leader in the Third Pursuit Squadron, the "Hell's Angels", Smith was credited with shooting down a total of 8.7, 8.9 or 9 Japanese planes, and was twice decorated by the Chinese government. The AVG continued to fight throughout Burma and southwest China until it was officially disbanded on July 4, 1942.

== 1st Air Commando Group ==
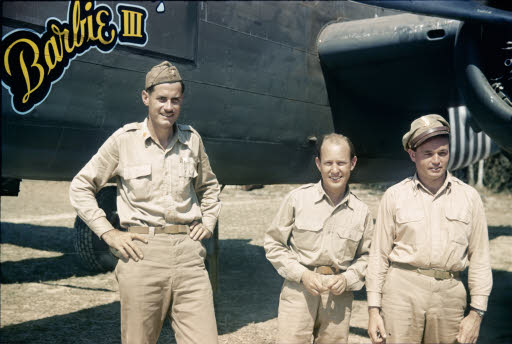
1st Air Commando Group Bomber Section Commander R.T. Smith and Co-commanders John Alison and Phil Cochran in front of R.T. Smith's B-25H "Barbie III" at Hailkandi, India, in March 1944

Smith returned to the United States on the USAT Mariposa along with 82 other AVG pilots and ground personnel. Prior to being drafted as a private in December 1942, Smith served as the technical advisor on The Sky's the Limit directed by E.H. Griffith and starring Fred Astaire and Joan Leslie. The side of the P-40 Astaire is flying at the beginning of the movie has a sitting Hell's Angel of the AVG's Third Squadron that was on the side of Smith's P-40 #77.

Smith was quickly recommissioned as a U.S. Air Corps second lieutenant and promoted to major the next month. For the next few months, as commanding officer of the 337 Fighter Squadron, 329 Fighter Group at Glendale, California and Paine Field, Everett, Washington, he trained replacement pilots using Lockheed P-38 Lightning fighter aircraft. Smith married Barbara Bradford in June 1943, adopting her son Brad from a previous marriage to vaudeville performer George Mann.

Shortly after being appointed commanding officer of the 329th Fighter Group in September 1943, he volunteered to return to the China-India-Burma Theater with the 1st Air Commando Group, flying occasional P-51 Mustang missions and commanding that group's B-25 Mitchell squadron in support of British General Orde Wingate's troops working out of India and moving behind Japanese lines in Burma (now Myanmar). One story is told of when Smith was flying alone in his P-51 (named "Barbie" after his wife) and saw a crowd gathered around a jeep on the flying field. Someone was making a speech and Smith assumed it was Phil Cochran, co-commander (with John Alison) of the 1st Air Commando Group. He put his P-51 into a dive and buzzed the speaker, nearly taking his hat off, at over 450 miles an hour. It was only after Smith landed that he learned the speaker was Lord Louis Mountbatten, Supreme Allied Commander, South-East Asia. Lord Mountbatten was not angry at Smith, but was angry at his aide for having him make a speech on an active flying field. Smith ("R.T." according to Chuck Baisden, for "Round Trip" while in the 1st Air Commando Group) was promoted to lieutenant colonel in March 1944, flew 55 combat missions over Burma, and was awarded the Air Medal, Distinguished Flying Cross and Silver Star.

== After discharge ==
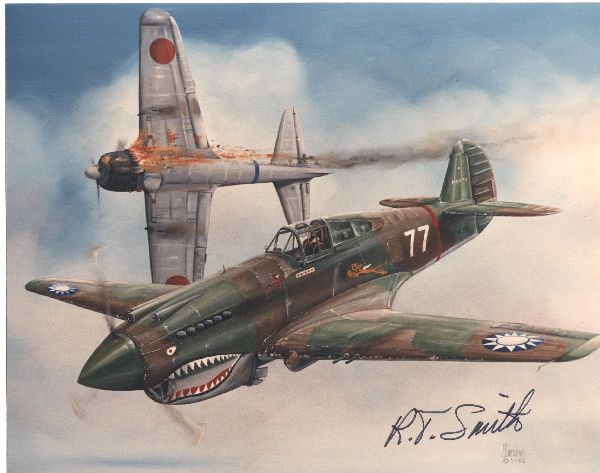
Painting of Curtiss P-40 Warhawk in the Republic of China Air Force, autographed by R.T. Smith

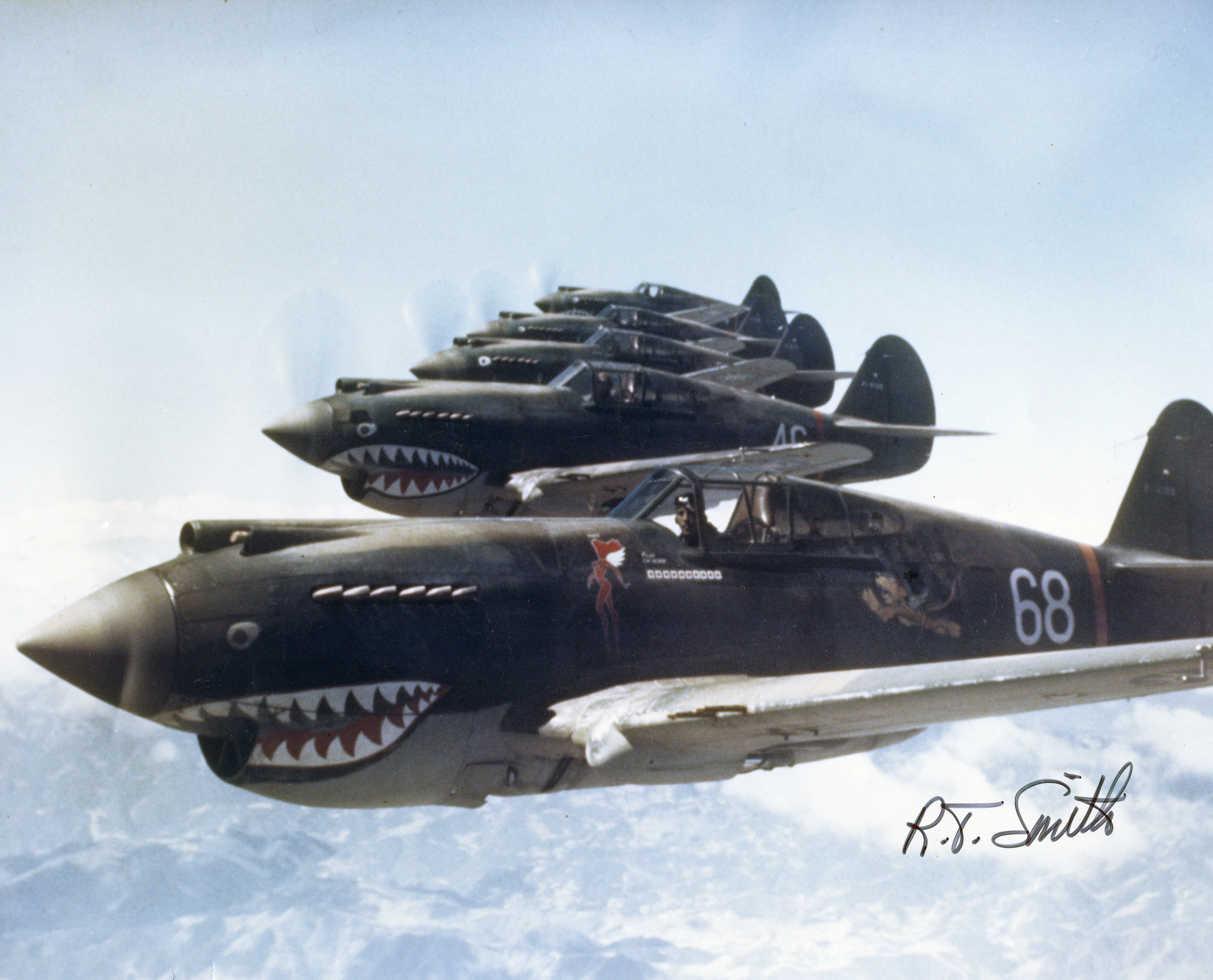
Hells Angels, Flying Tigers, in formation over China, 1942. Photo and autograph by R.T. Smith.

Smith returned to the United States in the late spring of 1944 and was assigned as Director of Flying Training with the 441st Army Air Force Base Unit at Van Nuys, California, a P-38 training base. The Base Operations Officer at the time was Major Barry Goldwater. He resigned from the Air Corps at the conclusion of World War II and bought a home in the San Fernando Valley in Southern California across from the Los Angeles River when it was actually a river instead of the concrete channel it is today.

After flying DC3s and Constellations between Los Angeles and Kansas City for a year and a half with Trans-World Airlines (TWA), he wrote radio scripts for the Hopalong Cassidy Western Adventure Show, Lum and Abner, The Phil Harris-Alice Faye Show, and the Clyde Beatty Show. He also wrote the screenplay (with Frank Taussig) for the 1953 movie Perils of the Jungle starring Clyde Beatty. Smith was co-owner of a toy manufacturing company (Smith-Miller); developed and sold a product for conditioning automobile convertible tops (Top Secret); and worked for Roy Weatherby as a sales manager for Weatherby's Inc.

R. T. and Barbara Smith were divorced in 1955. About this time, Smith joined Lockheed Aircraft Corporation as a technical writer, working his way up through the organization, first as a military sales representative for the F-104 Starfighter, and later to open and manage a new corporate office for Lockheed in Newport News, Virginia. (Gerhard Neumann, who joined the American Volunteer Group in China, designed the J79 jet engine used in the F-104.) Smith served at the rank of lieutenant colonel in the Air Force Reserve from 1949 to 1966.

Smith married Ronni Burkett in July 1965. During the late 1960s, he joined the Flying Tiger Line, founded by Robert Prescott, a fellow pilot with the American Volunteer Group, first as Vice President for Industrial Affairs in Washington, D.C. and later as Vice President for the Far East, headquartered in Tokyo. He left the Flying Tiger Line and Tokyo in the early 1970s to live and work in Palm Springs, California.

R. T. and Ronni Smith were divorced in the mid-1970s. He returned to the San Fernando Valley, where he wrote and published Tale of a Tiger, based on his original diary entries and several articles for Air Classics. He also established a mail-order business, selling his book and color photographs he shot while he was in the AVG and 1st Air Commando Group, including this often reproduced formation shot of the 3rd Squadron Hell's Angels taken on May 28, 1942 near the Salween River along the China-Burma border.

He died at age 77 (the number he had selected for his first P-40 in the AVG) of lung cancer on August 21, 1995.

Smith was survived by his sister, June, who died in 2001; three sons, Bradford, Robert, who died in 2021, and William, who died in 2023; and three grandchildren.
