= John R. Alison =

United States Air Force general

John Richardson Alison
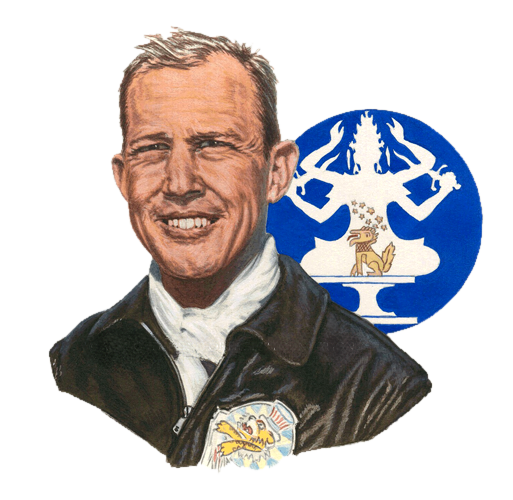
- John R. Alison; Gathering of Eagles 2004 Lithograph
- Born: November 21, 1912; Micanopy, Florida, U.S.
- Died: June 6, 2011 (aged 98); Washington, D.C., U.S.
- Burial place: Arlington National Cemetery
- Military career
- Allegiance: United States
- Branch: United States Army Air Forces; United States Air Force Reserve
- Service years: 1936–1972
- Rank: Major general
- Nickname: Johnny
- Units: 51st Fighter Group; 23rd Fighter Group
- Commands: 75th Fighter Squadron; 1st Air Commando Group
- Conflicts: World War II
- Awards: Distinguished Service Cross; Army Distinguished Service Medal; Silver Star; Legion of Merit (2); Distinguished Flying Cross; Purple Heart; Air Medal (2)
- Other work: Assistant Secretary of Commerce; Senior Vice President, Northrop

John Richardson Alison (November 21, 1912 – June 6, 2011) was a highly decorated American combat ace of World War II and is often cited as the father of Air Force Special Operations.

== Early years ==
Born in Micanopy, Florida, near Gainesville in 1912, Alison graduated from the University of Florida School of Engineering and joined the United States Army Air Corps in 1936. He earned his wings and was commissioned at Kelly Field in 1937. Prior to America's entry into World War II, he served as Assistant Military Attache in England and helped British pilots transition into the P-40. In October 1941, Alison traveled to Moscow to administer the sensitive U.S.-Soviet P-40 Lend-Lease program. He trained Soviet pilots in the P-40, A-20, and B-25 Mitchell aircraft. In his autobiography, Jimmy Doolittle wrote:

I might have gone to Russia, but Lieutenants Hubert Zemke and Johnny Alison, who had also been sent to England as observers, went instead. Good men, they both became aces later in the war. Johnny became a major general.

== Combat ==
After ten months and repeated requests for reassignment to combat, Alison got his wish. In June 1942, he reported to the China-Burma-India Theater (CBI) to serve as Deputy Squadron Commander under major David Lee "Tex" Hill in the 75th Fighter Squadron, part of Colonel Robert Lee Scott Jr.'s 23rd Fighter Group, the USAAF successor of the AVG's famed Flying Tigers in the China-Burma-India Theater.

Alison was called into theater by the previous commander of the AVG, Brigadier General Claire Lee Chennault, who was serving as commander of the Fourteenth Air Force. On July 30, 1942, Alison was credited with the first night kills in the theater. For his experimental night interception, he was awarded the Distinguished Service Cross. Alison again demonstrated his aggressiveness in early 1943, when he took off during an attack on his own airfield, engaged three Mitsubishi A6M Zeros, and scored one probable kill. He then vectored arriving reinforcements to the battle, after which he made a stern attack on another enemy fighter at close range, shooting it down. His gallantry and fighting spirit earned him the Silver Star. Ending his tour as commander of the 75th Fighter Squadron, Alison left as an ace with seven confirmed victories and several probable kills. His former commanding officer, David Lee "Tex" Hill, had high praise for Alison:

John Alison had the greatest pure flying skill of any pilot in the theater — a touch on the controls that knew no equal. His talents were matched only by his eagerness for combat.

== Air Commando ==
After returning home in May 1943, Alison was recalled to the CBI theater by Gen. Henry "Hap" Arnold to co-command (along with Lt. Col. Philip G. Cochran) the newly formed 1st Air Commando Group, also known as Project 9. As leader of this secret and highly innovative flying unit, Alison led a composite wing of fighters, bombers, transports and gliders in the dramatic "aerial invasion of Burma," dubbed Operation THURSDAY. The 1st Air Commandos supported the British "Chindit" Special Forces' infiltration of Japanese rear supply areas. In March 1944, Alison's men flew more than 200 miles behind enemy lines, transporting, re-supplying, and providing fire support for over 9,000 Allied forces. Alison's innovative leadership and combat daring as co-commander of the 1st Air Commandos helped to turn the tide of the Allied war effort in the CBI theater.

— John Alison's Gathering of Eagles Biography

Alison later commanded the 3rd Air Commando group in the Pacific serving in the Philippines and Okinawa.

== Later years ==
After the war, he served as an Assistant Secretary of Commerce, President of the Air Force Association, and as a major general in the Air Force Reserve. He retired as vice president of the Northrop Corporation in 1984 and is a 1994 inductee into the Air Commando Hall of Fame. In 2005, Alison was inducted into the National Aviation Hall of Fame. In 2006, he was made an honorary member of the U.S. Army Ranger Hall of Fame.

Alison died on June 6, 2011, and was buried at Arlington National Cemetery on October 3, 2011. Air Force Chief of Staff General Norton A. Schwartz provided the eulogy at the Old Post Chapel at Joint Base Myer–Henderson Hall. Following the chapel service, Secretary of the Air Force Michael Donley presented the American flag to Alison's wife, Penni, at the graveside service. Alison was survived by Penni, and their two sons, John and David. Shortly before his passing, he authorized the Washington DC Chapter of the Air Commando Association to use his name and they are known as the John R. Alison Chapter of the Air Commando Association.

== Awards and decorations ==
His awards and decorations include:

USAF Command Pilot Badge
Distinguished Service Cross	Army Distinguished Service Medal	Silver Star
Legion of Merit w/ 1 bronze oak leaf cluster	Distinguished Flying Cross	Purple Heart
Air Medal w/ 1 bronze oak leaf cluster	Air Force Presidential Unit Citation	American Defense Service Medal
American Campaign Medal	European-African-Middle Eastern Campaign Medal	Asiatic-Pacific Campaign Medal w/ 1 silver and 1 bronze campaign stars
World War II Victory Medal	Army of Occupation Medal w/ 'Japan' clasp	National Defense Service Medal
Air Force Longevity Service Award w/ 1 silver and 3 bronze oak leaf clusters	Armed Forces Reserve Medal w/ silver hourglass device	Distinguished Service Order (United Kingdom)

=== Distinguished Service Cross citation ===
Citation:

The President of the United States of America, authorized by Act of Congress, July 9, 1918, takes pleasure in presenting the Distinguished Service Cross to Major (Air Corps) John Richardson Alison, United States Army Air Forces, for extraordinary heroism in connection with military operations against an armed enemy while serving as Pilot of a P-40 Fighter Airplane in the 16th Fighter Squadron, 51st Fighter Group, Tenth Air Force, in aerial combat against enemy forces on 30 July 1942, over Hengyang, China. On that date, Major John Alison took off in a P-40 fighting plane at 1:00 a.m. to intercept an enemy formation of three heavy bombers flying at 15,000 feet over Hengyang. Without hesitation, he closed for attack upon this superior force, and although receiving fire from the hostile wing ships in engine and cockpit, he delivered fire in succession to each of the three bombers, two of which burst into flames and crashed. The other turned from the attack with smoke pouring from both engines and probably did not reach its home base. With his damaged plane failing and pursuit impossible, Major John Alison would have been justified under the circumstances, in leaving his ship by parachute, but he chose to attempt a night crash landing in order to save his vitally needed equipment. Being unable to reach the field, he landed in a nearby river, from which his plane was salvaged. In attacking this superior force at night, destroying two bombers and possibly the entire hostile formation after his ship had been damaged by enemy cross fire, and then attempting to save his stricken plane, Major John Alison displayed extraordinary heroism and outstanding skill. His unquestionable valor in aerial combat is in keeping with the highest traditions of the military service and reflects great credit upon himself, the 10th Air Force, and the United States Army Air Forces.
