= Jack Newkirk =

United States Navy officer

John V. Newkirk
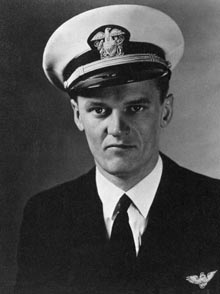
- Born: John Van Kuren Newkirk; 15 October 1913; New York City
- Died: 24 March 1942 (age 28); Chiang Mai, Thailand
- Burial place: St. James the Less Church; Scarsdale, NY
- Spouse: Virginia Jane Dunham
- Military career
- Allegiance: United States
- Branch: United States Navy
- Service years: 1938–1942
- Rank: Lieutenant
- Nickname: Scarsdale Jack
- Unit: USS Yorktown (CV-5)
- Conflicts: World War II; China Burma India Theater
- Awards: Distinguished Flying Cross (USA) (posthumous); Distinguished Flying Cross (UK) (posthumous)

John Van Kuren "Scarsdale Jack" Newkirk (15 October 1913 – 24 March 1942) was a United States naval aviator and squadron leader with the 1st American Volunteer Group (AVG), also known as the Flying Tigers, who may have led the first American offensive mission of World War II. Most of his combat experience was during the defense of Rangoon, Burma, from Japanese air attacks. After the fall of Rangoon, his unit was operating from within China when he set off on his final mission, as part of an attack on Japanese airfields in Thailand.

== Early life and education ==
Newkirk was born in New York City on 15 October 1913. One year later his family moved to Scarsdale, New York, where his father, Louis Hasbrouck Newkirk, worked as an attorney. Newkirk was known within the extended family as "Scarsdale Jack," to distinguish him from a younger cousin with the same name. At age ten, Newkirk was awarded a vocal scholarship to the Cathedral of St. John the Divine where he sang in the boys choir and attended the Cathedral School until age 14. Thereafter, Newkirk attended Scarsdale High School from which he graduated in 1932. During this time he was also active in the Boy Scouts of America and received his Eagle Scout medal from Admiral Richard E. Byrd at a ceremony in White Plains, New York. In the fall of 1932, Newkirk entered Rensselaer Polytechnic Institute in Troy, New York, to study aeronautical engineering. However, he was unable to afford tuition during the height of the Great Depression and dropped out after only one year. Newkirk subsequently worked odd jobs in New York City and served a brief stint in the New York National Guard until the fall of 1937, when he returned to Rensselaer to continue his studies.

== U.S. Navy service ==
Newkirk learned to fly while a student at Rennselaer, eventually accumulating two years of study which gave him the qualifications to become a cadet aviator in the US Navy. He joined the Navy in 1938 and after initial screening at Floyd Bennett Field in Brooklyn, he was transferred to Naval Air Station Pensacola in Florida where his classmates included David Lee "Tex" Hill and Bert Christman. Newkirk earned his wings in 1939 and was assigned to the USS Yorktown at Naval Station Pearl Harbor in Hawaii, where he remained on active duty until the summer of 1941.

While on leave, Newkirk visited his brother in Houston, Texas. Newkirk took a trip to the beach at Galveston where he met his wife to be, Virginia Jane Dunham. Born in Lansing, Michigan, she was known as Jane or Janie.

The Yorktown left Pearl Harbor on 20 April 1941 and docked in Norfolk, Virginia. While on shore leave there, Newkirk was "approached by a man who introduced himself as Commander Rutledge Irvine - retired". His mission would be to fly American P-40 aircraft against Japanese forces occupying China. Already incensed by reports of Japanese atrocities against the Chinese people, Newkirk accepted the offer.

On 15 June 1941 Newkirk told his sister that he had accepted an offer from the Central Aircraft Manufacturing Company (CAMCO), for a year, at $600 a month plus bonuses. After the contract was over he would be reinstated in the navy without any loss of rank or pay. The following day he carried out his final assignment for the U.S. Navy. He delivered a new Wildcat from the factory at Long Island to Norfolk, Virginia, where he signed his navy discharge papers.

== American Volunteer Group ==
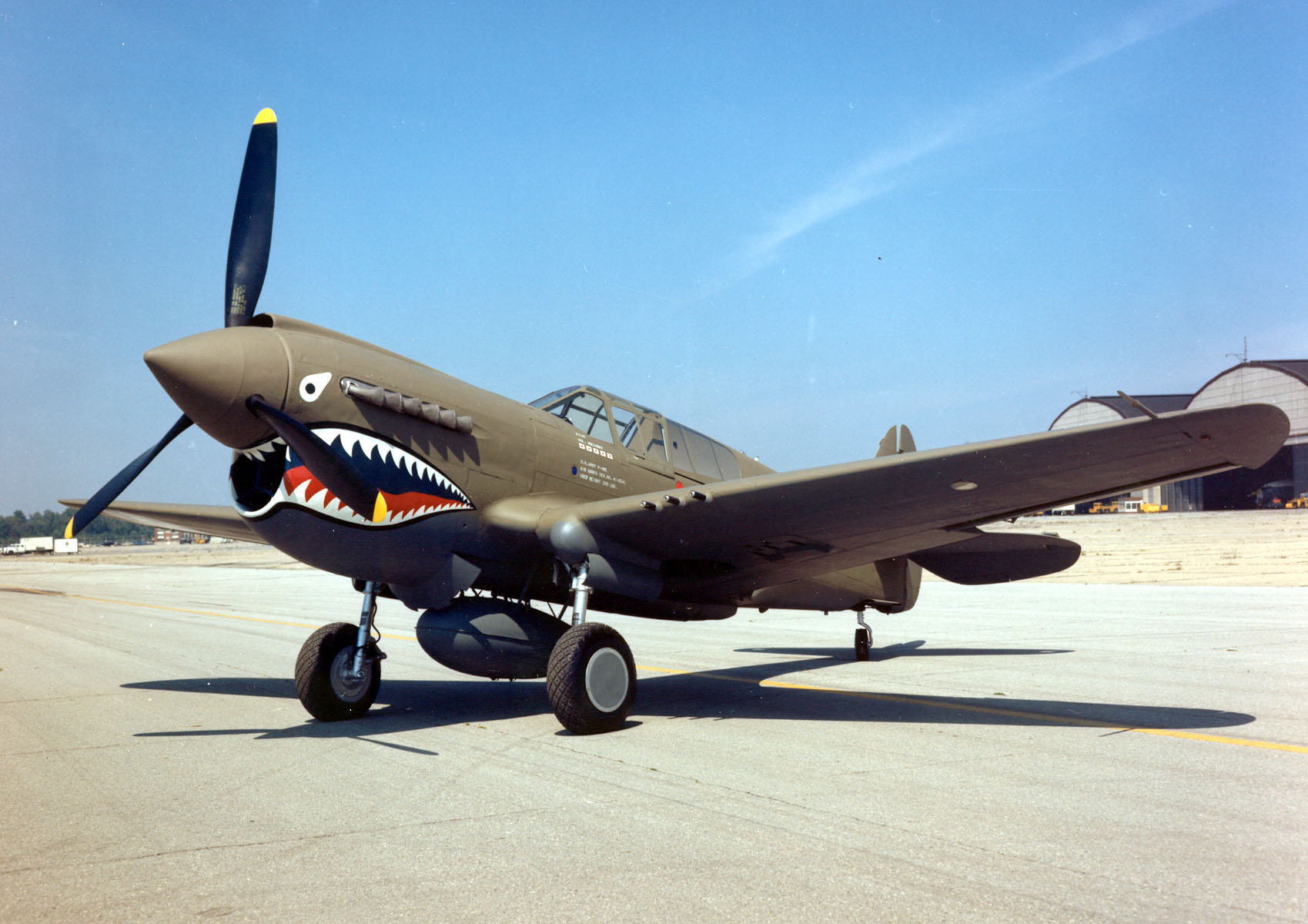
A Hawk 87A-3 (Kittyhawk Mk IA) serial number AK987, in a USAAF 23d Fighter Group (the former "Flying Tigers") paint scheme, at the National Museum of the United States Air Force.

CAMCO had been selected in April 1941 to be the front for the AVG, as a way to get round the neutrality laws. CAMCO then formed an agreement with the Chinese government to recruit and pay the pilots and ground crew for "three advanced training and instruction units". Chennault, whose idea it had been to use a civilian company, was appointed the "American supervisor". The 1st AVG, also known as The Flying Tigers, was manned on a one-year contract basis by volunteers recruited from serving U.S. military personnel.

Although naval aviators were, at that time, prohibited from marriage within two years of getting their wings, having left the navy, the marriage could go ahead. John and Jane were married on 5 July 1941 at the First Presbyterian Church of Houston, Texas. After a two-day honeymoon in a Houston hotel, they flew to San Francisco to meet up with other AVG recruits and their wives. They parted company on 10 July 1941 at the docks, where Newkirk boarded the M.V. Jagersfontein, with some of the AVG recruits on their way to Singapore, whilst Janie stayed in Los Angeles.

The AVG recruits were transported to Rangoon, Burma. In the latter half of 1941, AVG recruits were based at a British airfield in Toungoo undergoing training. Meanwhile, their aircraft were assembled and test flown by CAMCO staff at Mingaladon Airport outside Rangoon.

Newkirk was the squadron leader of the 2nd "Panda Bears" Squadron by September 1941. He led his squadron on the AVG's first combat mission, on 20 December 1941, southeast of Kunming, but ordered his flight to break off before contact. Chennault described this action as "buck fever" (nervousness felt by novice hunters when they first sight game).

On 30 December 1941, 2nd Squadron moved south from Toungou to Mingaladon with 18 fresh aircraft, relieving the 3rd Squadron, who had been there since 12 December. They shared the air defense of Rangoon with two British squadrons: 17 Squadron with Hawker Hurricanes and 67 Squadron with Brewster Buffaloes.

== First offensive mission ==
On the morning of 3 January 1942, Newkirk led Christman, Hill, and Jim Howard across Burma's Dawna Mountain Range in an attack against the Japanese-held Tak airfield near Raheng, Thailand. Christman's aircraft developed engine trouble, forcing him to return to base and leave Newkirk without a wingman. Upon arrival at the Raheng Aerodrome, the three pilots observed numerous Japanese aircraft parked by the runway but did not immediately notice the Japanese Ki-27 "Nate" fighters already in the air. Howard began to strafe the airfield, apparently unaware that an enemy aircraft was on his tail. Hill shot down the Nate pursuing Howard, then took on an additional one. Newkirk, who had engaged and destroyed one airborne Nate by then, was also credited with the third that Hill had also been engaging. Howard destroyed four Nates on the ground. With multiple enemy aircraft destroyed and the Raheng airfield in flames, Newkirk, Howard, and Hill all returned safely to base.

Military historian C. Douglas Sterner suggests this may have been the first planned American offensive mission of World War II, although the matter is open to debate. While Newkirk, Christman, Howard, and Hill had been U.S. Forces pilots, each had been required to resign his commission in order to join the Flying Tigers and thus were not U.S. military officers at the time. In 1991, a Pentagon special service review board ruled the Flying Tigers had indeed been on "active duty" during these battles and awarded them full veterans' status.

The USS Enterprise's 1 February attack on the Marshall Islands, traditionally considered America's first World War II offensive, came several weeks after the Flying Tigers' Raheng mission.

== Loss of Rangoon and retreat to China ==
Newkirk was credited with a Nate on 8 January 1942. The following day, Newkirk led another raid against the Tak airfield. Four 2nd Squadron and six RAF pilots took part and, between them, destroyed 24 Japanese aircraft.

On 12 January 1942, the Japanese invasion of Burma began and Mingaladon was reinforced with a further eight aircraft. Another Ki-27 Nate was credited to him on 20 January, and three days later he achieved another victory but his aircraft was badly shot up and he had to crash land. The remainder of the 2nd Squadron were sent to Rangoon on 25 January. On 28 January 1942, Newkirk told Chennault that the "airplanes we have here are now are beginning to look like patchwork quilts for the holes in them. The engines are also getting tired" Newkirk left Rangoon on 10 February but, to get to the AVG base in Kunming, he had to go via India. By 7 March 1942, Rangoon had fallen and the defense of the Burma Road became the priority of the Flying Tigers.

The AVG continued some of its operations from Magwe, which was heavily bombed by the Japanese. Chennault ordered retaliatory raids against Chiang Mai and Lampang on 23 March 1942. Because these bases were out of range of the P-40s, from their main base at Kunming, it was decided to go via Loi Wing (Leiyun), in China, then launch the raid from the RAF airstrip at Nam Sang, Burma.

== Death and controversy ==
On 24 March 1942, the aircraft took off in darkness from Nam Sang and by 06:30 all were en route to Chiang Mai. Newkirk's part of the mission was to lead his flight past Chiang Mai to Lampang and, if no targets could be found there, return to help with the main raid on Chiang Mai. Arriving ahead of the main force over Chiain Mai, Newkirk's flight of four aircraft strafed the main railway depot in passing and then continued towards Lampang, approximately 45 miles (72 km) to the southeast.

Newkirk's aircraft crashed in a ball of flame and he was killed instantly close to Lamphun. It was believed at the time that Newkirk's aircraft was hit by ground fire. Later investigations, including discussions with eyewitnesses, raised the possibility that Newkirk may have inadvertently hit a tree. His body was thrown clear of the wreckage and landed in a paddy field. He was buried locally by the Japanese.

== Aftermath ==
Newkirk was credited with seven air-to-air victories, during his time with the Flying Tigers, and 10.5 kills overall by CAMCO. In 1942, the "Scarsdale Jack Unit" was named in his memory at the U.S. Navy pre-training camp in Chapel Hill, North Carolina. He was awarded the British Distinguished Flying Cross, posthumously, in August 1943.

Newkirk's widow, Virginia Jane remarried after his death, marrying U.S. diplomat Charles Dudley Withers, who later became the U.S. Ambassador to Rwanda, serving in that role from April 1963 until September 1966. She died on 16 July 1982 in Naples, Florida; leaving no children.

After the war, Newkirk's body was disinterred by a joint Thai-American military team and reburied in Saint James the Less Cemetery, Scarsdale, Westchester County, New York on 11 May 1949. Newkirk was awarded the Distinguished Flying Cross, posthumously, in 2007, following the 1991 official recognition of the Flying Tigers as veterans of World War II.

== Popular culture ==
The American press, eager for positive stories about U.S. involvement in the war effort, quickly turned "Scarsdale Jack" into one of the nation's most written-about fighter pilots during the first few months of the war. Broadcaster Lowell Thomas mentioned him by name on several occasions, as did Life Magazine, Time Magazine, the Associated Press, the United Press, and the Chicago Daily News and New York Times. The Walt Disney organisation created an official Flying Tigers insignia – a winged Bengal tiger with extended claws flying through a large blue V for victory – which Newkirk and other AVG members sewed on their flight jackets and painted on their aircraft. Zip Comics and Wings Comics each devoted full-color spreads to Newkirk and his aerial exploits.
