= Charles Older =

American flying ace (1917–2006)

- Older onboard his P-51 Mustang during World War II

Judge of the Los Angeles County Superior Court
- In office 1967–1987
- Appointed by: Ronald Reagan

Personal details
- Born: September 29, 1917 Hanford, California, U.S.
- Died: June 17, 2006 (aged 88) West Los Angeles, California, U.S.
- Education: University of California, Los Angeles; University of Southern California
- Occupation: Judge, lawyer and fighter pilot

Military service
- Allegiance: United States
- Branch/service: United States Marine Corps Reserve; United States Army Air Forces; United States Air Force Reserve
- Years of service: 1940–1945; 1950–1952
- Rank: Lieutenant colonel
- Battles/wars: World War II; Korean War
- Awards: Distinguished Flying Cross (2); Bronze Star Medal; Air Medal (2); Distinguished Flying Cross (United Kingdom); Order of the Cloud and Banner (China)

Charles Herman Older (September 29, 1917 – June 17, 2006) was an American judge and flying ace. He was the third highest scoring ace of the American Volunteer Group (the "Flying Tigers") and later the judge in the Charles Manson murder trial.

== Early life ==
Older was born in Hanford, California, on September 29, 1917. He earned a degree in political science from the University of California, Los Angeles in 1952.

== Military service ==
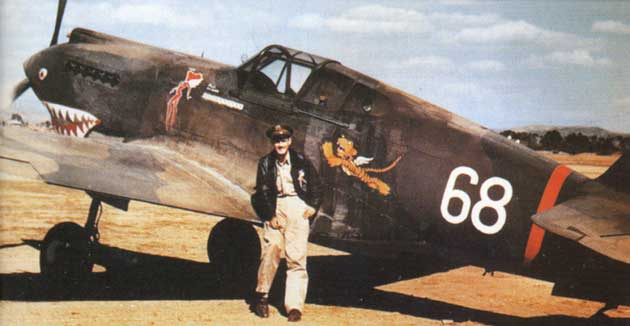
R. T. Smith in front of Older's P-40B in Kunming, China

Older became a pilot in the Marine Corps Reserve, but resigned to join the American Volunteer Group, better known as the Flying Tigers, to fight the Japanese prior to the United States entry into World War II. A member of the 3rd Pursuit Squadron (the "Hell's Angels"), he is credited with 10 victories, making him a double ace. By the end of the war, he had been promoted to lieutenant colonel.

In 1950, he was called back to active duty, flying the Douglas B-26 Invader in the Korean War.

== Law career ==
He graduated from University of Southern California School of Law in 1952. After a distinguished legal career, he was appointed to the bench of the Los Angeles Superior Court by Governor Ronald Reagan in 1967. Older served for 20 years before retiring.

His most famous case was the Charles Manson trial. The trial lasted 10 months, the longest in American history at the time. Prosecutor Vincent Bugliosi praised Older for his firm, but fair, handling of the difficult case. At one point, Manson tried to attack the judge with a pencil and had to be restrained by bailiffs. Older subsequently began carrying a .38 revolver around with him as a result.

== Death ==
On June 17, 2006, he died at the age of 88 of complications from a fall in his home in West Los Angeles. He was survived by his wife, Catherine Day Older, and three daughters.
