= Charles Bond (pilot) =

United States Air Force general

Charles Rankin Bond, Jr.
- Charles Bond (photo from Museum of Flight)
- Born: April 22, 1915; Dallas, Texas, U.S.
- Died: August 18, 2009 (aged 94); Dallas, Texas, U.S.
- Military career
- Allegiance: United States; China
- Branch: United States Army Air Corps; Republic of China Air Force; United States Army Air Forces; United States Air Force
- Service years: 1932–1968
- Rank: Major general
- Commands: Twelfth Air Force; 28th Air Division; 25th Air Division
- Conflicts: World War II: Burma Campaign; China-Burma-India Theater; Vietnam War
- Awards: Air Force Distinguished Service Medal; Legion of Merit (2); Purple Heart; Army Commendation Medal; Order of the Cloud and Banner with Cravat (China); Distinguished Flying Cross (United Kingdom)

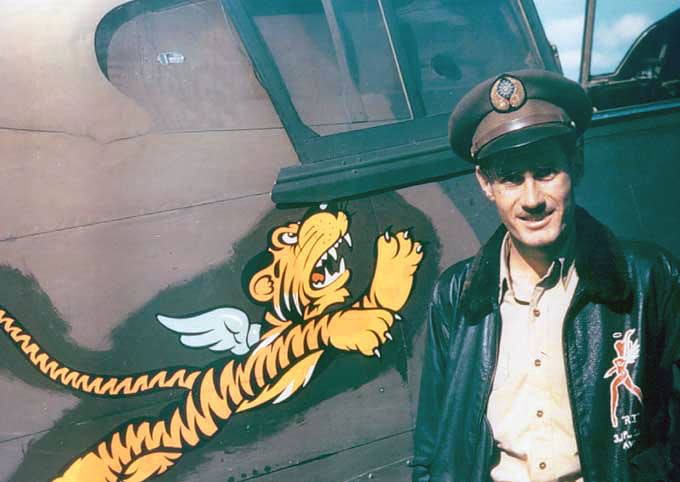
The Flying Tigers insignia painted on the side of their planes was designed by The Walt Disney Company.

Charles Rankin Bond, Jr. (April 22, 1915 – August 18, 2009) was an American pilot and United States Air Force officer. He served with the Flying Tigers in Burma and China during World War II. He was shot down twice and was credited with shooting down 9.5 Japanese airplanes. He later served in the Soviet Union as an aide and personal pilot to W. Averell Harriman. He rose to the rank of Major General and, during the Vietnam War, he was the deputy commanding officer of the 2d Air Division in Vietnam and the 13th Air Force in the Philippines. He retired from the United States Air Force in 1968 as commander of the Twelfth Air Force. In 1984, Bond's diary of his service with the Flying Tigers was published and became a bestseller.

== Early years ==
Bond was born in Dallas, Texas, on April 22, 1915, the son of Charles R. Bond, Sr., and Magnolia Turner Bond. His father operated a small business painting and hanging wallpaper. Bond was an honor student in high school and a participant in the Reserve Officers' Training Corps. He joined the Texas National Guard while in high school. His family could not afford to send him to college. In 1935, he enlisted in the United States Army and enrolled in a West Point preparatory program hoping to be selected to attend the United States Military Academy. After failing to secure an appointment to the Military Academy, he returned home and worked for his father in the painting business.

In 1938, Bond learned of a program through which high school graduates could take an examination in lieu of college for acceptance as a pilot in the United States Army Air Corps. He passed the exam and reported to Randolph Field for pilot training. He received his commission as a pilot in January 1939. In February 1939, he was assigned to the Second Bomb Group at Langley, Virginia, where he served under Curtis LeMay. In March 1941, he was assigned to the newly formed U.S. Army Air Corps Ferrying Command in Long Beach, California.

== World War II ==
Upon learning in June 1941 about the formation of the American Volunteer Group under the command of Claire Chennault, Bond immediately volunteered and departed in September 1941 to serve in the Pacific. After stops in Hawaii, Java, and Singapore, he arrived in Burma on November 12, 1941. The unit, based in Burma and China, was tasked with protecting supply routes between China and Burma and with supplying Chinese forces fighting the Japanese. The group was credited with shooting down 299 Japanese aircraft. It became known as the "Flying Tigers". After seeing a picture of a Royal Air Force plane in North Africa, the group painted a shark mouth on the nose of their planes. Bond was the first to paint his Curtiss P-40 Warhawk. Bond was credited with shooting down nine and a half Japanese aircraft, including three during a single 1942 mission. Bond was also shot down twice during his Flying Tigers service: in May 1942, he was shot down over Baoshan, China, and he parachuted into a cemetery after his plane and clothing caught fire. He was hospitalized, but returned to combat and was shot down again in June 1942; he suffered head injuries but returned to combat within a week.

The Flying Tigers received $500 for each Japanese plane they shot down, and Bond used the money to help his parents buy a house. He was awarded China's Order of the Cloud and Banner, fifth grade, and Seven Star Wing Medal for his service in the Flying Tigers.

Bond returned to the United States in 1942 and was honored by the Dallas Junior Chamber of Commerce as one of the most outstanding young men in Texas. In October 1942, he rejoined the Army Air Corps. During the latter part of the war, Bond served as an aide and the personal pilot for W. Averell Harriman, the American ambassador to the Soviet Union during the war. In that position, Bond met Soviet Premier Joseph Stalin and many Russian officials. Bond was forced to make an emergency landing at Stalingrad after the famous battle for that city.

== Post-war military service ==
In 1949, Bond received a Bachelor of Science degree in management engineering from Texas A&M University. He worked briefly worked as a commercial pilot, but rejoined the Army Air Forces after a few months of civilian work. In the post-war years, Bond had assignments with the Army Air Force School of Applied Tactics and as chief of the Air Division of the U.S. Military Mission in Moscow.

In 1957, Brigadier General Bond assumed command of the 25th Air Division (Defense) with headquarters at McChord Air Force Base. In 1959, Brigadier General Bond assumed command of the 28th Air Division (Defense) with headquarters at Hamilton Air Force Base.

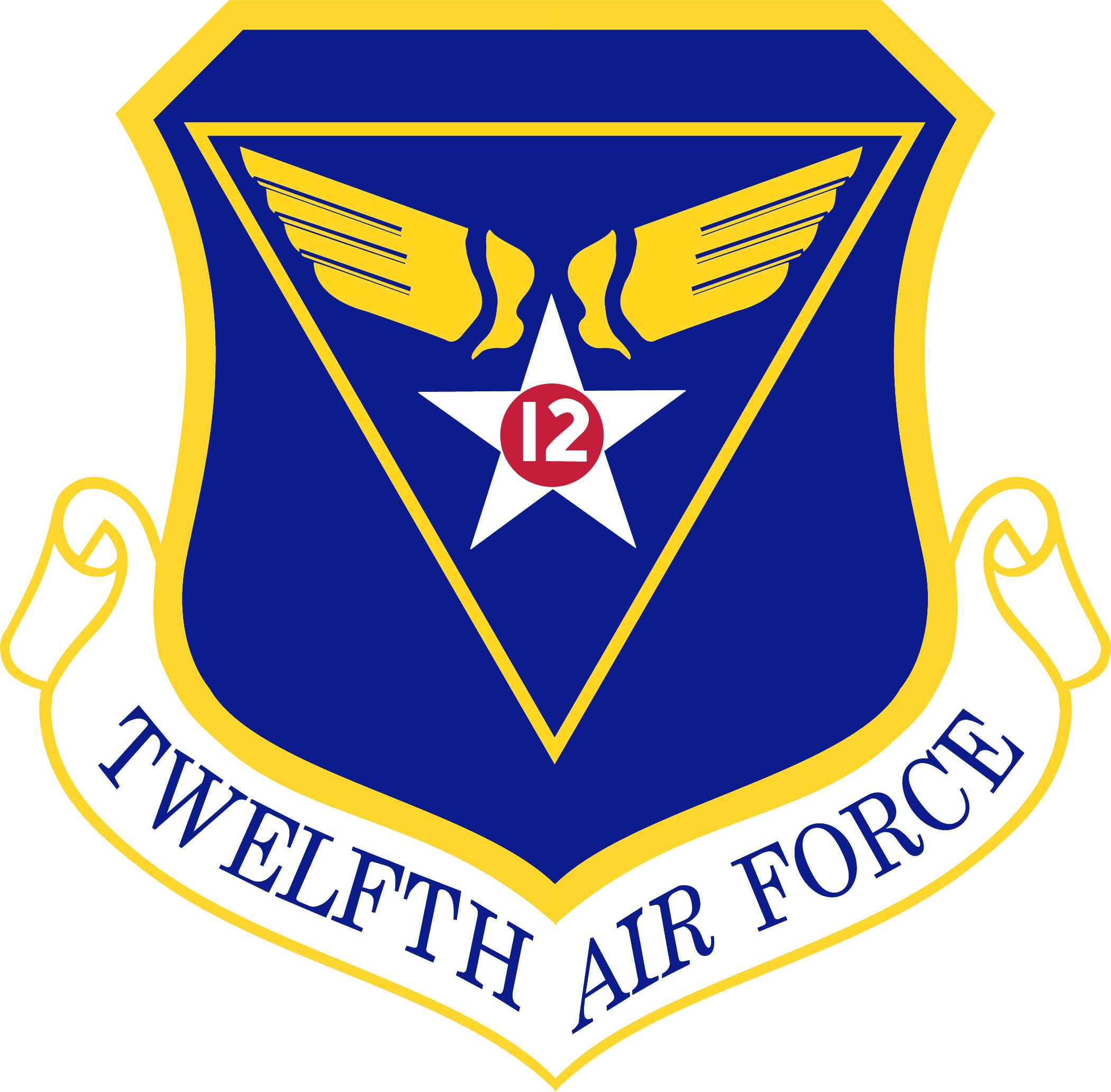
At the time of his retirement, Bond was commander of the Twelfth Air Force (insignia pictured).

During the Vietnam War, he served as deputy commanding officer of the 2nd Air Division in Vietnam and the 13th Air Force in the Philippines. In 1967 and 1968 he was commander of the Twelfth Air Force in Waco, Texas. In January 1968, President Lyndon Johnson presented a Minuteman flag to Bond in ceremonies at Bergstrom Air Force Base in Texas. Bond accepted the flag on behalf of the entire Twelfth Air Force.

In addition to the Chinese decorations, Bond was awarded the Air Force Distinguished Service Medal, the Legion of Merit with one oak leaf cluster, the Army Commendation Medal, the Purple Heart, the British Distinguished Flying Cross, and several other service and campaign medals during his military career.

== Later years ==
After retiring from the military in 1968, Bond worked as a consultant for Texas Instruments for ten years. He also worked for a skylight manufacturing company before retiring in 1983.

In 1984, Bond co-authored A Flying Tiger's Diary with Terry H. Anderson, a historian at Texas A&M University. The bestselling book was based on a diary in which Bond made entries at the end of each day in 1941 and 1942 while serving with the Flying Tigers.

Bond died at an assisted-living facility in Dallas from the effects of dementia.
