= Robert Neale (pilot) =

- Born: May 3, 1914; Vancouver, Canada
- Died: November 29, 1994
- Military career
- Allegiance: United States
- Branch: United States Navy; Republic of China Air Force
- Units: USS Saratoga; American Volunteer Group
- Commands: 1st Squadron, American Volunteer Group
- Conflicts: World War II
- Awards: Distinguished Service Order (United Kingdom)

Robert Hawthorne Neale (May 3, 1914 – 1994) was the top flying ace with the American Volunteer Group (AVG), amassing 13 victories.

Neale left his studies at the University of Washington to enlist in the United States Navy in 1938. He became an aviator, receiving his wings in 1939, and was a dive-bomber pilot on the aircraft carrier USS Saratoga (CV-3), flying the Curtiss SBC Helldiver and Douglas SBD Dauntless. Ensign Neale resigned his commission to join the AVG of the Chinese Air Force in June 1941.

Neale took over the AVG's 1st Squadron (the "Adam & Eves") after its commander, Robert Sandy Sandell, was killed, and was decorated by the British government with the Distinguished Service Order for his exploits in the defense of Burma. Neale was one of the AVG pilots who volunteered two weeks' additional service in China after the group was disbanded; during that interim, he commanded the U.S. Army's 23rd Fighter Group—as a civilian—pending the arrival of the designated commander, Colonel Robert Scott. He declined a commission as a major in the United States Army Air Forces. The AVG records credit him with 13 air-to-air victories, making him its top-scoring ace.

After returning to the United States, Neale served as a civilian transport or ferry pilot for Pan American World Airways. He was running a Camano Island fishing resort at the time of his death in 1994.
