= Flying Tigers =

Group of American pilots who flew for the Republic of China Air Force in 1941–42

1st American Volunteer Group
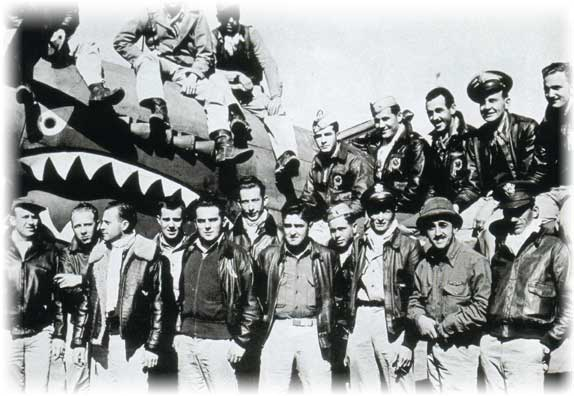
- Flying Tigers personnel
- Active: April 1941 – 4 July 1942; Became China Air Task Force in July 1942
- Country: Republic of China; United States
- Allegiance: Republic of China; United States
- Branch: Air Force
- Type: Fighter pilot group
- Size: 3 squadrons; 60 aircraft average
- Nickname: The Flying Tigers

Commanders
- Notable commanders: Claire Chennault

Flying Tigers
- Traditional Chinese: 飛虎隊
- Simplified Chinese: 飞虎队
Transcriptions
Standard Mandarin
- Hanyu Pinyin: Fēi hǔ duì

Alternative Chinese name
- Traditional Chinese: 中華民國空軍美籍志願大隊
- Simplified Chinese: 中华民国空军美籍志愿大队
Transcriptions
Standard Mandarin
- Hanyu Pinyin: Zhōnghuá mínguó kōngjūn měi jí zhìyuàn dàduì

US Air Forces video: Flying Tigers Bite Back

The First American Volunteer Group (AVG; Chinese: 中華民國空軍美籍志願大隊) of the Republic of China Air Force, nicknamed the Flying Tigers (飛虎隊), was formed to help oppose the Japanese invasion of China. Operating in 1941–1942, it was composed of pilots from the United States Army Air Corps (USAAC), Navy (USN), and Marine Corps (USMC), and was commanded by then-Brigadier General Claire Lee Chennault. Their Curtiss P-40B Warhawk aircraft, marked with Chinese Nationalist colors, flew under American control. Recruited under President Franklin Roosevelt's authority before Pearl Harbor, their mission was to bomb Japan and defend the Republic of China, but many delays meant the AVG first flew in combat after the United States and Japan declared war.

The group consisted of three fighter squadrons of around 30 aircraft each that trained in Burma before the American entry into World War II to defend the Republic of China against Japanese forces. The AVG were officially members of the Republic of China Air Force. The group had contracts with salaries ranging from $250 a month for a mechanic to $750 for a squadron commander, roughly three times what they had been making in the U.S. forces. While it accepted some civilian volunteers for its headquarters and ground crew, the AVG recruited most of its staff from the U.S. military.

The Flying Tigers began to arrive in China in April 1941. The group first saw combat on 20 December 1941, 12 days after Pearl Harbor. It demonstrated innovative tactical victories when the news in the U.S. was filled with little more than stories of defeat at the hands of the Japanese forces, and achieved such notable success during the lowest period of the war for both the U.S. and the Allied Forces as to give hope to America that it might eventually defeat Japan. AVG pilots earned official credit and received combat bonuses for destroying 296 enemy aircraft, while losing only 14 pilots in combat. The combat records of the AVG still exist and researchers have found them credible. On 4 July 1942 the AVG was disbanded and replaced by the 23rd Fighter Group of the United States Army Air Forces, which was later absorbed into the U.S. Fourteenth Air Force with General Chennault as commander. The 23rd FG went on to achieve similar combat success, while retaining the nose art on the left-over P-40s.

== Origin ==
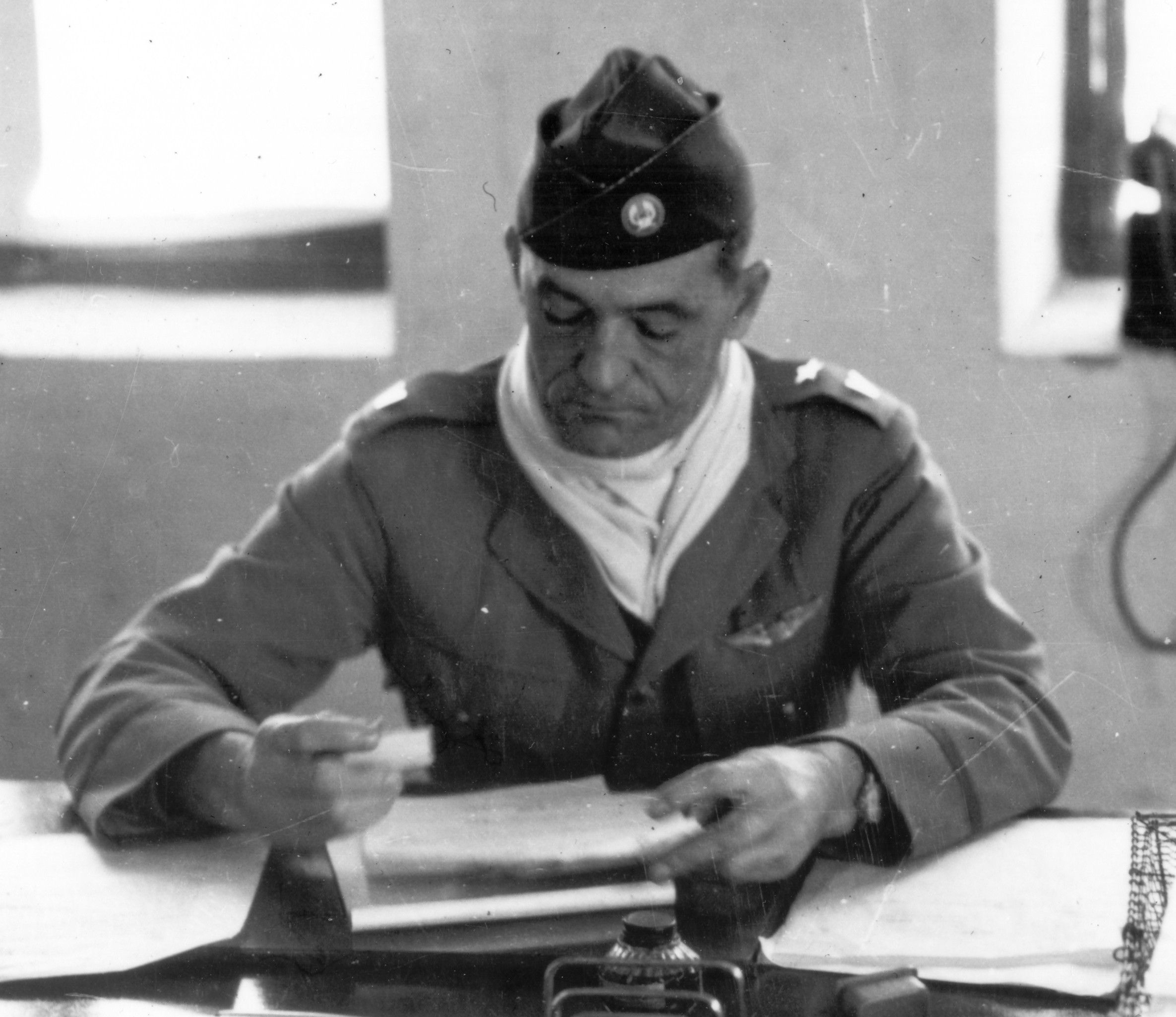
Chennault in his Kunming office, May 1942. He wears a US Army brigadier general's star on his left shoulder but Chinese insignia otherwise.

The American Volunteer Group was largely the creation of Claire L. Chennault, a retired U.S. Army Air Corps officer who had worked in China since August 1937, first as military aviation advisor to Generalissimo Chiang Kai-shek in the early months of the Sino-Japanese War, then as director of a Chinese Air Force flight school centered in Kunming. Meanwhile, the Soviet Union supplied fighter and bomber squadrons to China, but these units were mostly withdrawn by the summer of 1940. Chiang then asked for American combat aircraft and pilots, sending Chennault to Washington as an adviser to China's ambassador and Chiang's brother-in-law, T. V. Soong.

Chennault spent the winter of 1940–1941 in Washington, supervising the purchase of 100 Curtiss P-40 fighters and the recruiting of 100 pilots and some 200 ground crew and administrative personnel that would constitute the 1st AVG. He also laid the groundwork for a follow-on bomber group and a second fighter group, though these would be aborted after the Pearl Harbor attack.

=== Original American volunteer group ===
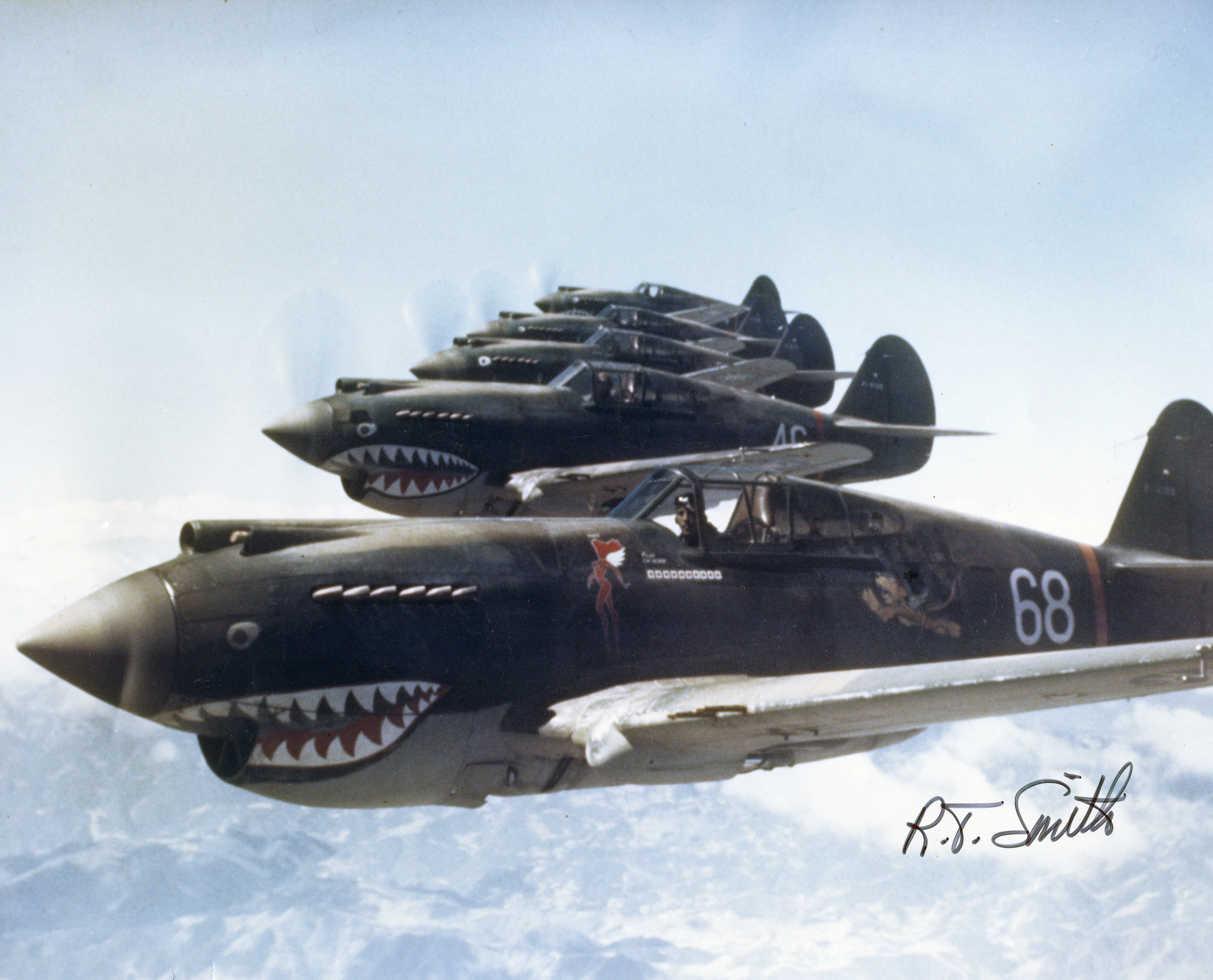
3rd Squadron Hell's Angels, Flying Tigers, over China, photographed in 1942 by AVG pilot Robert T. Smith

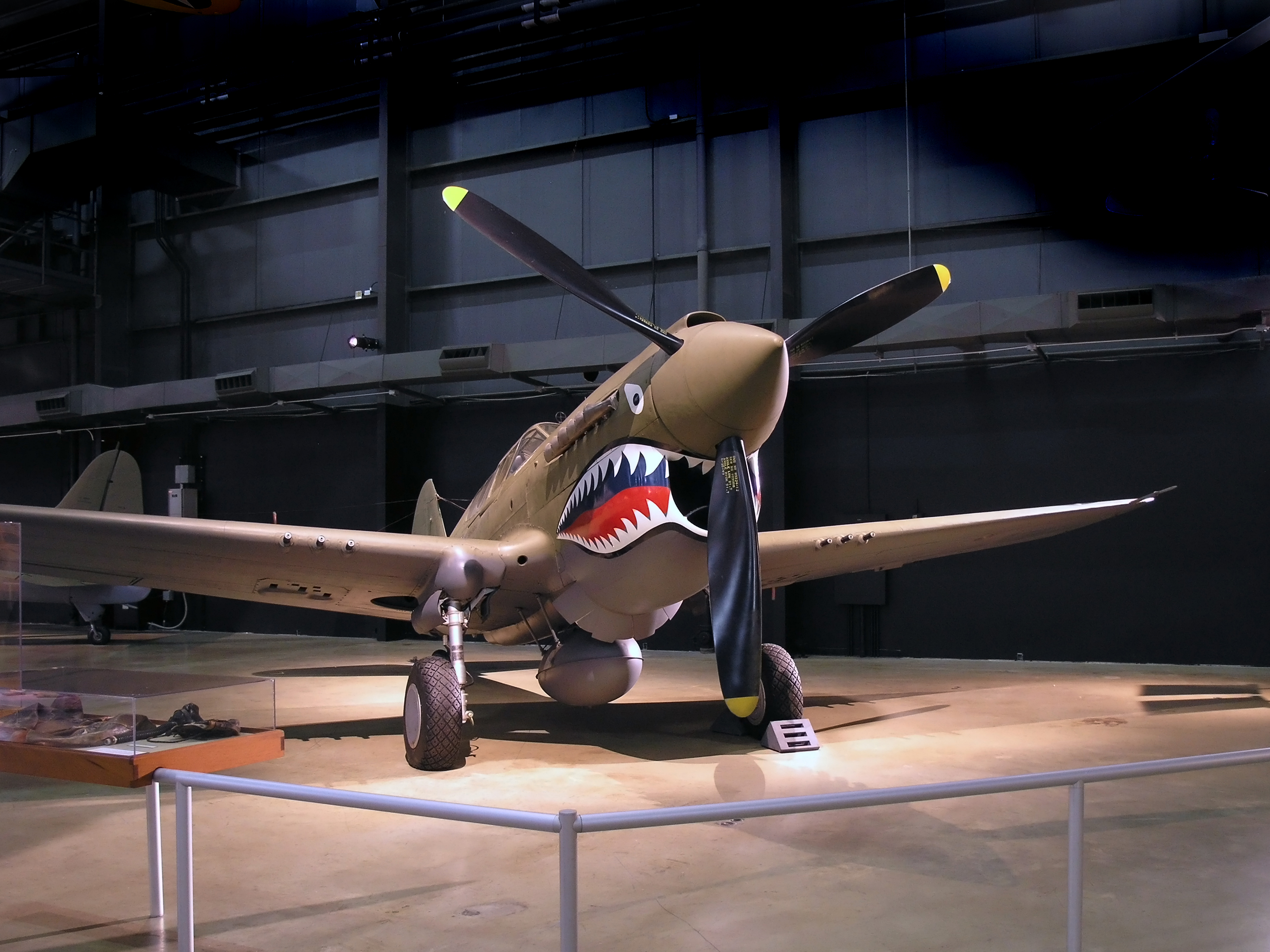
P-40 Warhawk painted with Flying Tigers shark face at the National Museum of the United States Air Force

Of the pilots, 60 came from the Navy and Marine Corps and 40 from the Army Air Corps. (One army pilot, Albert Baumler was refused a passport because he had earlier flown as a mercenary in Spain, so only 99 actually sailed for Asia. Ten more army flight instructors were hired as check pilots for Chinese cadets, and several of these would ultimately join the AVG's combat squadrons.) The volunteers were discharged from the armed services, to be employed for "training and instruction" by a private military contractor, the Central Aircraft Manufacturing Company (CAMCO), which paid them $600 a month for pilot officers, $675 a month for flight leaders, $750 for squadron leaders (no pilot was recruited at this level), and about $250 for skilled ground crewmen. Some pilots were also orally promised a bounty of $500 for each enemy aircraft shot down, and this was later confirmed by Madame Chiang Kai-shek.

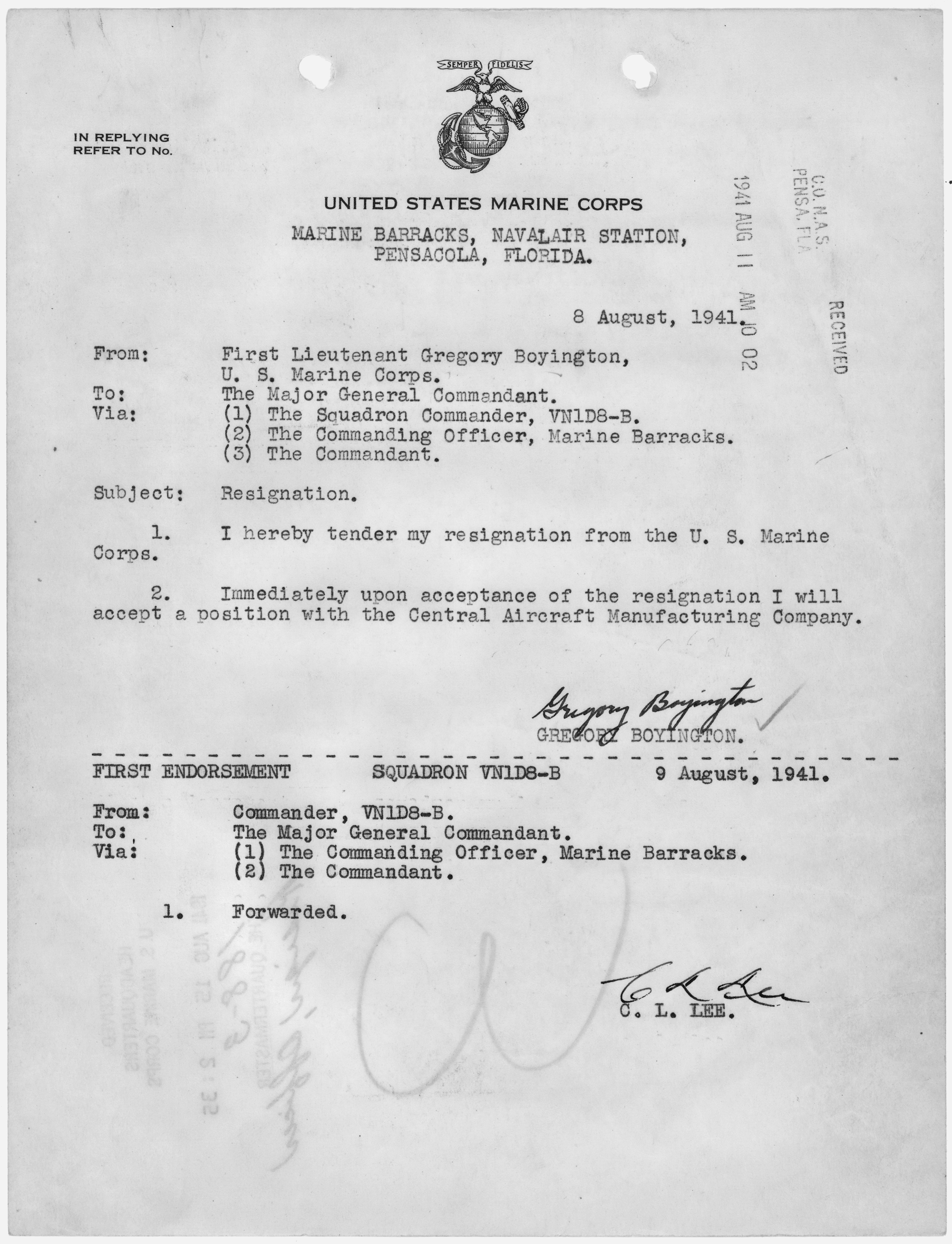
Resignation letter from the U.S. Marine Corps, used to accept a position with the Central Aircraft Manufacturing Co.

The first batch, some 300 men, departed San Francisco on 10 July 1941 and arrived in Rangoon, Burma, on 28 July, on the Dutch ship Jaegersfontaine, operated by Java-Pacific Lijn. The second batch, some 30 pilots, departed on 24 September 1941 and arrived on 12 November on the Dutch ship Boschfontein. These volunteers used civilian passports on these trips. After arriving in Rangoon, they were initially based at a British airfield in Toungoo for training while their aircraft were assembled and test flown by CAMCO personnel at Mingaladon Airport outside Rangoon. Chennault set up a schoolhouse that was made necessary because many pilots had "lied about their flying experience, claiming pursuit experience when they had flown only bombers and sometimes much less powerful aeroplanes." They called Chennault "the Old Man" due to his much older age and leathery exterior obtained from years flying open cockpit pursuit aircraft in the Army Air Corps. Most believed that he had flown as a fighter pilot in China, although stories that he was a combat ace are probably apocryphal.

Of the 300 original members of the CAMCO personnel, nine were Chinese-Americans recruited from America's Chinatowns. All nine were trained at Allison Engineworks in Indianapolis, Indiana: all were P-40 mechanics. Upon arrival in Kunming, two other Chinese-Americans were hired, a Ford Motor truck specialist and a doctor, raising the total to 11. Prior to 4 July 1942, three of the P-40 mechanics resigned. The official AVG roster lists the original eight.

The AVG was created by an executive order of Generalissimo Chiang Kai-shek. He did not speak English, however, and Chennault never learned to speak Chinese. As a result, all communications between the two men were routed through Soong Mei-ling, "Madame Chiang" as she was known to Americans, and she was designated the group's "honorary commander."

=== Chennault fighter doctrine ===
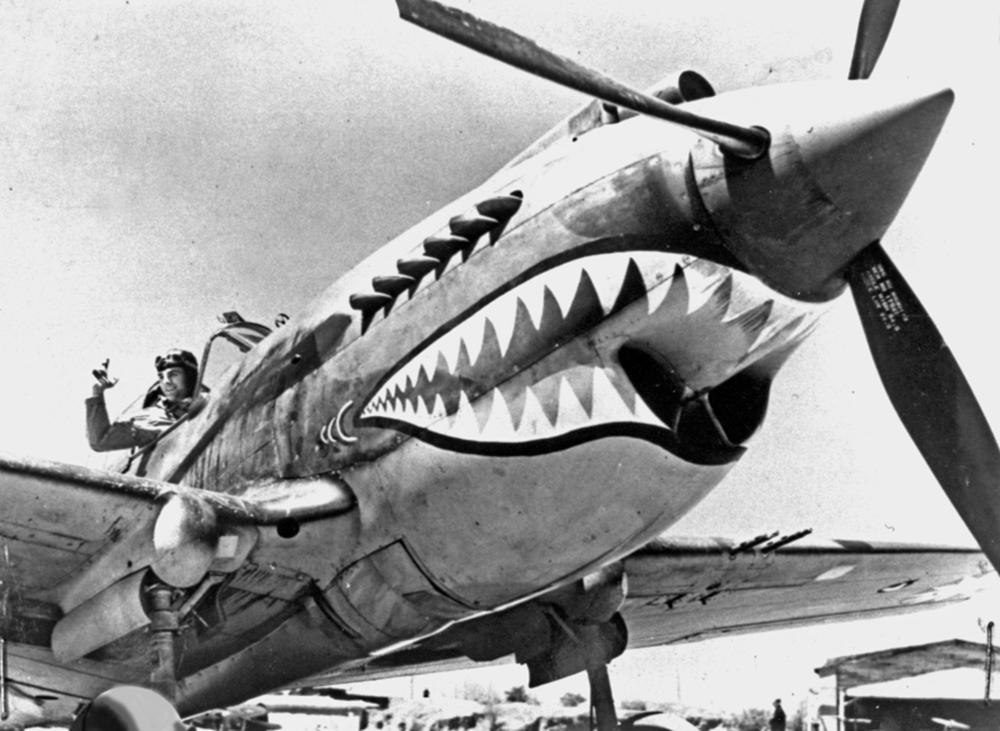
Flying Tiger on the apron

Chennault preached a radically different approach to air combat based on his study of Japanese tactics and equipment, his observation of the tactics used by Soviet pilots in China during the undeclared Soviet–Japanese border conflicts in 1939, and his judgment of the strengths and weaknesses of his own aircraft and pilots. When Japanese aircraft attacked, Chennault's doctrine called for pilots to take on enemy aircraft in teams from an altitude advantage, since their aircraft were not as maneuverable or as numerous as the Japanese fighters they would encounter. He prohibited his pilots from entering into a turning fight with the nimble Japanese fighters, telling them to execute a diving or slashing attack and to dive away to set up for another attack. This "dive-and-zoom" technique was used successfully by Soviet units serving with the Chinese Air Force, although it was contrary to what the AVG pilots had learned in U.S. service as well as what the Royal Air Force (RAF) pilots in Burma had been taught.

To take full advantage of "dive-and-zoom" tactics, Chennault created an early warning network of spotters that would give his P-40 fighters time to take off and climb to a superior altitude before engaging the Japanese. Chennault and the Flying Tigers benefited from the country's warning network, called "the best air-raid warning system in existence":

Starting from areas in Free China, in hundreds of small villages, in lonely outposts, in hills and caves, stretching from near Canton through all Free China to the capital in Chungking and to Lanchow, far northwest, are a maze of alarm stations equipped with radios and telephones that give instant warning of the approach of Japanese planes.

The actual average strength of the AVG was never more than 62 combat-ready pilots and fighters. Chennault faced serious obstacles since many AVG pilots were inexperienced and a few quit at the first opportunity. However, he made a virtue out of these disadvantages, shifting unsuitable pilots to staff jobs and always ensuring that he had a squadron or two in reserve. (The AVG had no ranks, so no division between officers and enlisted soldiers existed.)

=== Curtiss P-40 ===
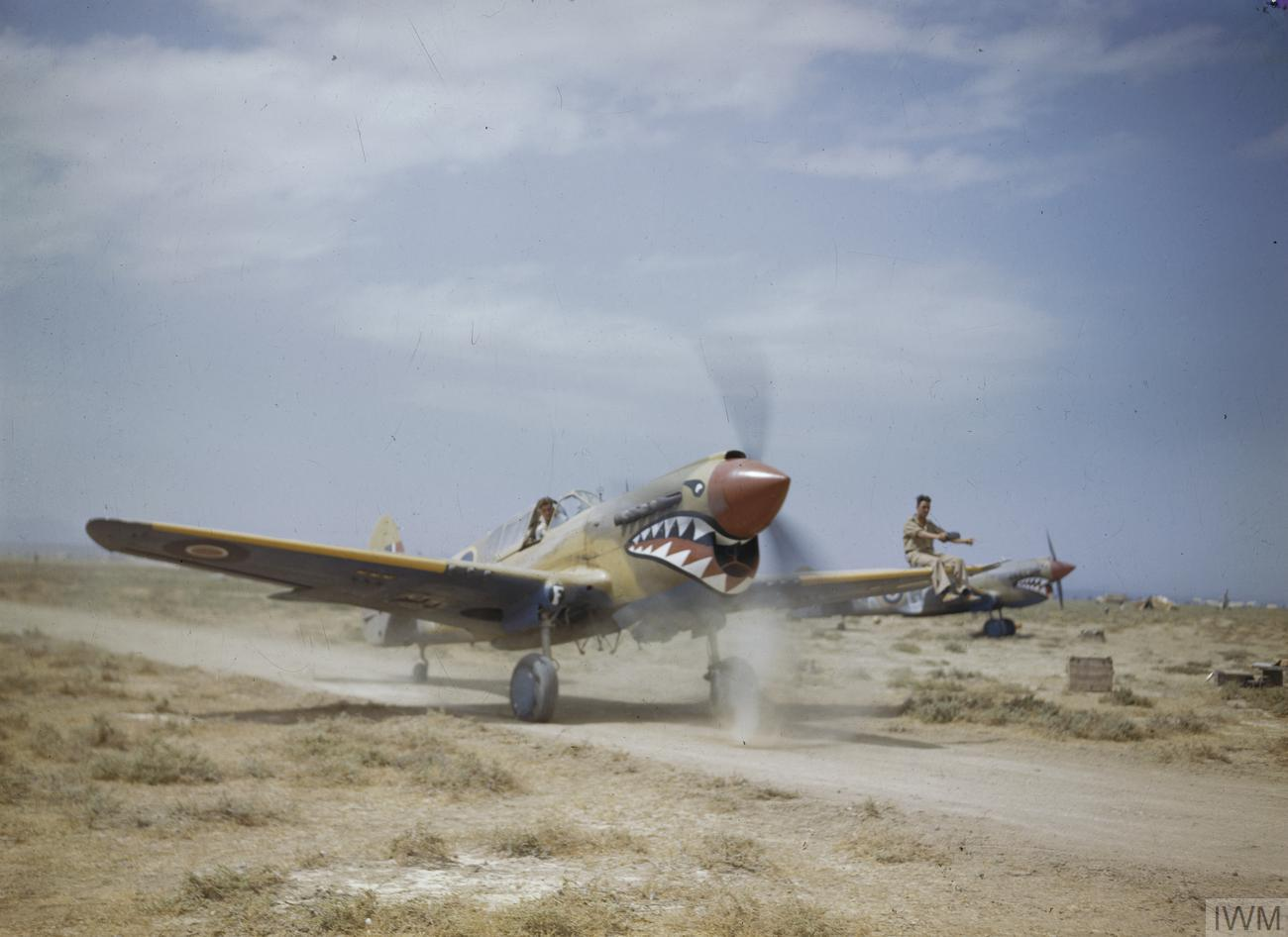
1943: A Kittyhawk Mark III of 112 Squadron, taxiing through scrub at Medenine, Tunisia. The ground crewman on the wing is directing the pilot, whose view ahead is hindered by the aircraft's nose.

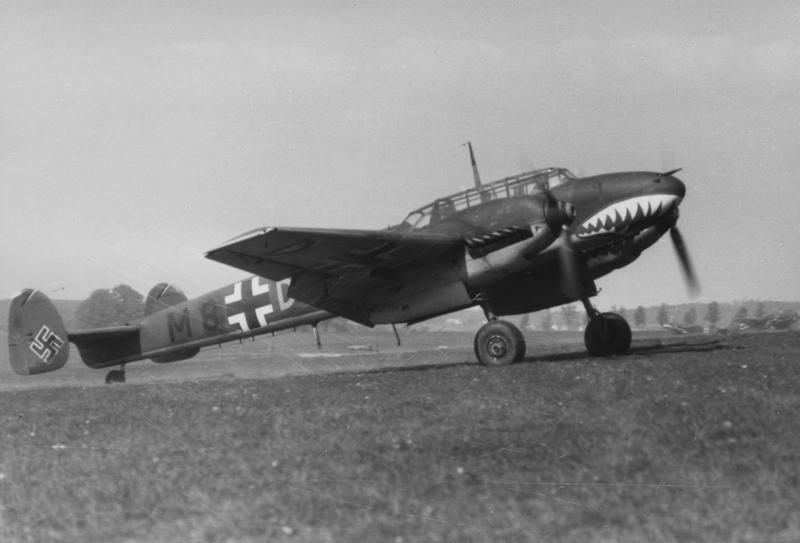
A ZG 76 Bf 110C with "sharks mouth" nose paint

AVG fighter aircraft came from a Curtiss assembly line which had just started producing Tomahawk IIB models for the Royal Air Force in North Africa. The Tomahawk IIB was similar to the U.S. Army's P-40C, but there is some evidence that Curtiss actually used leftover components when building the fighters intended for China, making them closer to the older P-40B/Tomahawk IIA specification - for instance the AVG aircraft had fuel tanks with external self-sealing coatings, rather than the more effective internal membranes as fitted to the P-40C/Tomahawk IIB, and the aircraft built for China lacked the later Tomahawk's fittings to carry a drop tank and the addition of an armor plate in front of the pilot. The fighters were purchased without "government-furnished equipment" such as reflector gunsights, radios and wing guns; the lack of these items caused continual difficulties for the AVG in Burma and China.

The 100 P-40 aircraft were crated and sent to Burma on third country freighters during spring 1941. At Rangoon, they were unloaded, assembled and test flown by personnel of Central Aircraft Manufacturing Company (CAMCO) before being delivered to the AVG training unit at Toungoo. One crate was dropped into the water and a wing assembly was ruined by salt water immersion, so CAMCO was able to deliver only 99 Tomahawks before war broke out. (Many of those were destroyed in training accidents.) The 100th fuselage was trucked to a CAMCO plant in Loiwing, China, and later made whole with parts from damaged aircraft. Shortages in equipment, with spare parts almost impossible to obtain in Burma (along with the slow introduction of replacement fighter aircraft), were continual impediments, although the AVG did receive 50 replacement P-40E fighters from USAAF stocks toward the end of its combat tour.

AVG fighter aircraft were painted with a large shark face on the front of the aircraft. This was done after pilots saw a photograph of a P-40 of No. 112 Squadron RAF in North Africa, which in turn had adopted the shark face from German pilots of the Luftwaffe's ZG 76 heavy fighter wing, flying Messerschmitt Bf 110 fighters in Crete. (The AVG nose-art is variously credited to Charles Bond and Erik Shilling.) About the same time, the AVG was dubbed "The Flying Tigers" by its Washington support group, called China Defense Supplies. The P-40's good qualities included pilot armor, self-sealing fuel tanks, sturdy construction, heavy armament, and a higher diving speed than most Japanese aircraft – qualities that Chennault's combat tactics were devised to exploit. To gain full advantage, Chennault created an early warning network of spotters that would give his fighters time to take off and climb to a superior altitude before engaging the Japanese.

== Combat history ==
The port of Rangoon in Burma and the Burma Road leading from there to China were of crucial importance. Eastern China was under Japanese occupation, so all military supplies for China arrived via the Burma route. By November 1941, when the pilots were trained and most of the P-40s had arrived in Asia, the Flying Tigers were divided into three squadrons: 1st Squadron ("Adam & Eves"); 2nd Squadron ("Panda Bears") and 3rd Squadron ("Hell's Angels"). They were assigned to opposite ends of the Burma Road to protect this vital line of communications. Two squadrons were based at Kunming in China, and a third at Mingaladon Airport near Rangoon. When the United States officially entered the war, the AVG had 82 pilots and 79 aircraft, although not all were combat-ready. Tiger Erik Shilling, part of the third squadron commented: "This was the beginning of the greatest adventure I would ever hope to experience. It wasn't until years later that I fully realized the magnitude and significance of this first step, to be a lifelong adventure in the mystic Far East."

The AVG's first combat mission was on 20 December 1941, when aircraft of the 1st and 2nd squadrons intercepted 10 unescorted Kawasaki Ki-48 "Lily" bombers of the 21st Hikōtai attacking Kunming. The bombers jettisoned their loads before reaching Kunming. Three of the Japanese bombers were shot down near Kunming and a fourth was damaged so severely that it crashed before returning to its airfield at Hanoi. Later, Chinese intelligence intercepted Japanese communications indicating that only 1 out of the 10 bombers ultimately returned to base. Furthermore, the Japanese discontinued their raids on Kunming while the AVG was based there. One P-40 crash-landed; it was salvaged for parts. This mission was one of the earliest American aerial victories in the Pacific War.

=== Defense of Rangoon ===
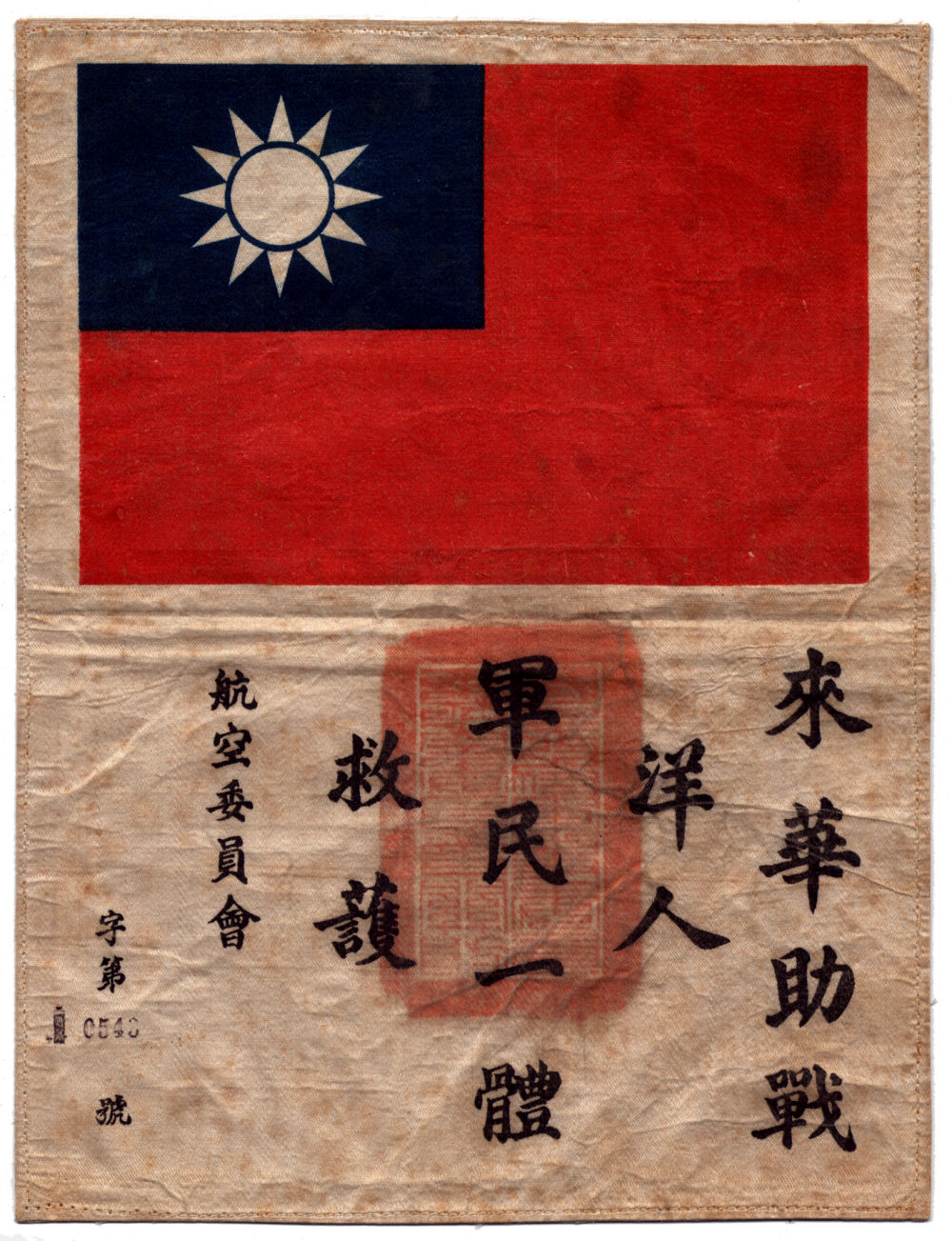
A "blood chit" issued to the American Volunteer Group Flying Tigers. The Chinese characters read, "This foreign person has come to China to help in the war effort. Soldiers and civilians, one and all, should rescue and protect him." (R. E. Baldwin Collection)

The first squadron had flown up to Kunming to defend the terminus of the Burma Road and saw some combat action on 20 December 1941 while defending Rangoon from Japanese bombers, taking down four of them and disrupting their attack on the Burma Road.

At this time, the focus of Japan's offensive efforts in the AVG's coverage area was southern Burma. The 3rd Squadron – 18 aircraft strong – defended Rangoon from 23 to 25 December. On 23 December, Mitsubishi Ki-21 "Sally" heavy bombers of the 60th, 62nd and 98th Sentai, along with single-engined Mitsubishi Ki-30 "Ann" attack bombers of the 31st Sentai, sortied against Rangoon. They were escorted by Nakajima Ki-27 "Nate" fighters of 77th Sentai. The Imperial Japanese Army Air Force (JAAF) formation was intercepted by the AVG and RAF Brewster Buffalos of 67 Squadron. Eight Ki-21s were shot down for the loss of three AVG P-40s. The 60th Sentai was particularly hard hit – it lost five out of the 15 bombers it had dispatched. Nevertheless, Rangoon and Mingaladon airfield were successfully bombed, with the city suffering more than 1,000 dead. Two Buffalos and two P-40s were destroyed on the ground, and one P-40 crashed when it attempted to land on a bomb-damaged runway.

On 25 December, the JAAF returned, reinforced by Ki-21s of 12th Sentai and Nakajima Ki-43 Hayabusas (Oscars) of the 64th Sentai (Colonel Tateo Katō's Flying Squadron). A total of 63 bombers escorted by 25 fighters were committed. These were intercepted by 14 P-40s of the AVG's 3rd Squadron and 15 Buffalos of 67 Squadron. In the two encounters, 35 Japanese bombers and fighters were shot down. The Allies lost two pilots and five P-40s. Mingaladon airfield was once again damaged, and eight Buffalos were destroyed on the ground.

After its losses in the 23–25 December battles, the 3rd Squadron was relieved by the 2nd Squadron "Panda Bears", which carried out a series of raids on JAAF airbases in Thailand. The Japanese had moved aircraft to Malaya to finish off Singapore, and its remaining aircraft in the area (the 77th, 31st and 62nd Sentai) launched fighter sweeps and counter raids on the Allied airfield at Mingaladon.

On 12 January, the Japanese launched their Burma Campaign. Significantly outnumbered, the AVG was gradually reduced through attrition, but often exacted a disproportionate toll of their attackers. On 24 January, six Ki-21s of the 14th Sentai escorted by Ki-27s attacked Mingaladon. All the Ki-21s were shot down by the AVG and RAF defenders. On 28 January, a fighter sweep of 37 Ki-27s was engaged by 16 AVG P-40s and two RAF fighters. Three "Nates" were shot down for the loss of two P-40s. The next day, another sweep of 20 Ki-27s of the 70th Sentai was met by 10 Allied fighters (eight P-40s and two Hawker Hurricanes). Four were shot down for the loss of no Allied aircraft.

Despite these minor victories and Chennault's reinforcement of the "Panda Bears" with pilots from the "Adam and Eves", by mid-February, only 10 P-40s were still operational at Mingaladon. Commonwealth troops retreated before the Japanese onslaught, and the AVG was pressed into the ground attack role to support them. One unfortunate result of these missions was a prolonged air attack on a suspected Japanese column on 21 February that turned out to consist of Commonwealth troops. More than 100 Allied people died in this friendly fire incident. On 27 February, after hearing that the RAF was retreating and pulling out its radar equipment, the AVG withdrew to bases in northern Burma.

By 24 January, the Flying Tigers had destroyed 73 Japanese aircraft while losing only five themselves – a notable performance, considering the AVG was outnumbered and faced experienced and fully trained Japanese pilots. The main disadvantage of JAAF fighter pilots of this period was the near-obsolescence of the Japanese' predominant fighter type in the theater, the Ki-27. Though more maneuverable than the P-40, its armament and performance was inferior. Lightly constructed and armed, it could not withstand frontal attacks nor could it out-dive Allied fighters such as the P-40; if it attempted to, it often came apart in the air. In fact, its cruising speed was less than that of the Ki-21 bombers it was intended to escort.

=== Retreat into China ===
After Rangoon was lost to the Japanese at the end of February, the AVG relocated to Magwe, a small British airfield more than 300 miles north of Rangoon. Chennault started moving elements of the now reconstituted 3rd Squadron to Magwe as reinforcement to his worn down 1st and 2nd squadrons. Aircraft attrition became so high that at this point, individual squadron distinctions became meaningless, and all three squadrons had elements based there, along with a number of RAF aircraft. In total, the Allies had 38 aircraft, including eight P-40s and 15 Hawker Hurricanes. Opposing them were 271 Japanese aircraft, including 115 fighters. Although the AVG and the RAF scored some successes against the JAAF, Magwe was continuously bombed, including a very heavy raid on 21 March by 151 bombers and fighters. On 23 March with only four aircraft left, the AVG was forced to relocate to Loiwing, just across the Chinese border. The Tigers crossed into China on a rickety suspension bridge over a deep gorge. A few months later, they came back to destroy the bridge so no Japanese soldiers could come across that way into China.

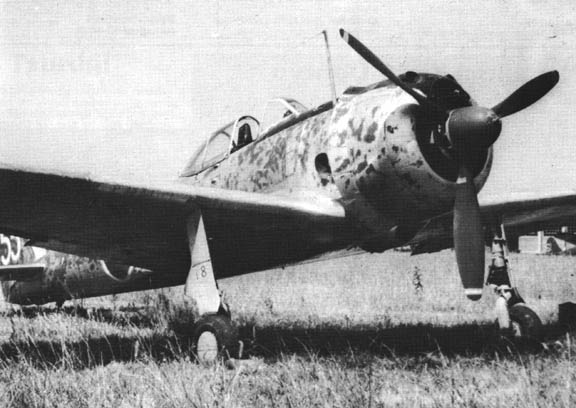
The Nakajima Ki-43 Hayabusa was a single-engined land-based fighter used by the Imperial Japanese Army Air Force in World War II

Reinforced by new P-40E "Kittyhawks" and by repaired aircraft from the AVG's excellent maintenance group, 12 P-40s were based at Loiwing on 8 April. Despite the long retreats, their losses and incessant air combat, the AVG still retained their abilities. That day, 12 Oscars from the 64th Sentai raided the base. In the ensuing series of dogfights, four Ki-43s were downed in exchange for one P-40E destroyed on the ground. During this period, Chinese and American commanders pressured Chennault to order his pilots to undertake so-called "morale missions". These were overflights and ground attacks intended to raise the morale of hard-pressed Chinese soldiers by showing they were getting air support. The AVG's pilots seethed with resentment at these dangerous missions (which some considered useless), a feeling which culminated in the so-called "Pilot's Revolt" of mid-April. Chennault suppressed the "revolt" and ordered the ground attack missions to continue. But despite their efforts, the Allied situation in Burma continued to deteriorate. On 29 April the AVG was ordered to evacuate Loiwing and relocate to Baoshan in China.

Like the AVG's other bases, Baoshan was repeatedly bombed by the Japanese Army Air Force. Still, the AVG scored against their JAAF tormentors, bringing down four "Nates" of the 11th Sentai on 5 May and two "Anns". By 4 May, the successful Japanese Burma offensive was winding down, except for mopping up actions. One of these was an attempt by a regiment of the Japanese 56th Division to drive for Kunming, an effort that was stopped by the Chinese army operating with strong air support from the AVG. On 7 May the Japanese Army began building a pontoon bridge across the upper Salween River, which would allow them to move troops and supplies into China and drive towards Kunming. To stem this tide, 2nd Squadron Leader David Lee "Tex" Hill led a flight of four new P-40Es bombing and strafing into the mile deep Salween River Gorge. During the next four days, the AVG pilots flew continuous missions into the gorge, effectively neutralizing the Japanese forces. This prevented a Japanese advance on Kunming and Chongqing; the Japanese never advanced farther than the west bank of the upper Salween. Claire Chennault later wrote of these critical missions, "The American Volunteer Group had staved off China's collapse on the Salween." Despite being on the defensive thereafter, the AVG continued to harass the JAAF with raids on their Vietnamese bases.

With the Burma campaign over, Chennault redeployed his squadrons to provide air protection for China. The Doolittle Raid had prompted the Japanese to launch an offensive to seize AVG air bases that could be used for attacks on the Japanese homeland. By 1 June, personnel that would form the nucleus of the new USAAF 23rd Fighter Group (the AVG's replacement) were beginning to trickle into the theater. Some of the last missions the AVG flew were defending Guilin against raids by JAAF Nates, Lilys, and new Kawasaki Ki-45 Toryu ("Nick") heavy fighters. The AVG's last combat was over Hengyang on the day it was disbanded, 4 July 1942. In this final action, the AVG shot down four Ki-27s with no AVG losses.

== Assessment of the AVG ==
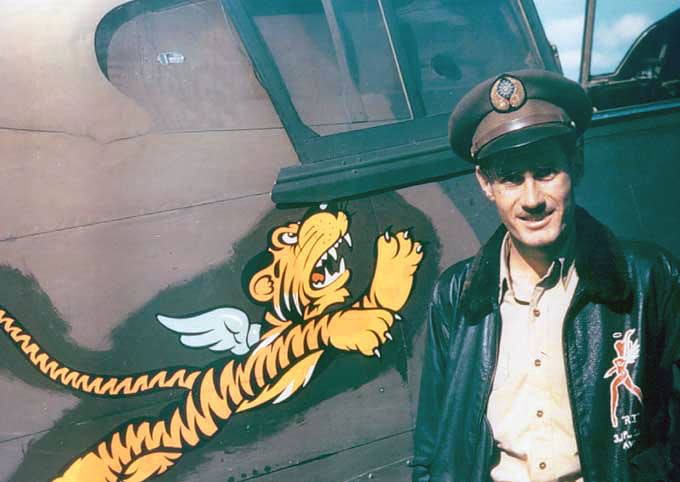
Flight leader and fighter ace Robert "R.T." Smith stands next to his P-40 fighter at Kunming, China. The "Flying Tiger" insignia was created by the Walt Disney Company.

The AVG was officially credited with 297 enemy aircraft destroyed, including 229 in the air. Fourteen AVG pilots were killed in action, captured, or disappeared on combat missions. Two died of wounds sustained in bombing raids, and six were killed in accidents during the Flying Tigers' existence as a combat force. The AVG's kill ratio was superior to that of contemporary Allied air groups in Malaya, the Philippines, and elsewhere in the Pacific theater. The AVG's success is all the more remarkable since they were outnumbered by Japanese fighters in almost all their engagements. The AVG's P-40s were superior to the JAAF's Ki-27s, but the group's kill ratio against modern Ki-43s was still in its favor. In Flying Tigers: Claire Chennault and His American Volunteers, 1941–1942, Daniel Ford attributes the AVG's success to morale and group esprit de corps. He notes that its pilots were "triple volunteers" who had volunteered for service with the U.S. military, the AVG, and brutal fighting in Burma. The result was a corps of experienced and skilled volunteer pilots who wanted to fight.

During their service with the Nationalist Chinese air force, 33 AVG pilots and three ground crew received the Order of the Cloud and Banner, and many AVG pilots received the Chinese Air Force Medal. Each AVG ace and double ace was awarded the Five Star or Ten Star Wing Medal.

The AVG's accomplishments were astounding considering their lack of resources and amenities. They were afforded only "four doctors, three nurses and a bottle of iodine", while serving in areas with widespread malaria and cholera. Pilots found the food disgusting, and the slow mail from home and lack of women hurt morale. A squadron had 45 maintenance personnel compared to the normal more than 100, and only one base could perform major repairs.

== Members of the AVG ==
The military chaplain of the AVG described the background of the volunteers in his memoir, "Most men were escaping from frustrations or disappointments, as perhaps I was. They hoped an unknown future in unknown places would somehow give them a second chance. One of the oldest was a tough former sergeant major about forty-three, irreconcilably divorced. One of the youngest was a boy of nineteen who had enlisted in the army, then got right out again for this junket; he was longing for adventures with lots of shooting, perhaps because he was small for his age. A majority came from the South and West, and Texans were the largest group from any state."

- Gregory "Pappy" Boyington broke his contract with the AVG in the spring of 1942 and returned to active duty with the U.S. Marine Corps. He went on to command the "Black Sheep" Squadron and was one of two AVG veterans (the other being James H. Howard of the USAAF) to be awarded the Medal of Honor.
- David Lee "Tex" Hill later commanded the USAAF 23rd Fighter Group.
- Charles Older earned a law degree postwar, became a California Superior Court judge, and presided at the murder trial of Charles Manson.
- Kenneth Jernstedt was a long-time Oregon legislator and mayor of his home town of Hood River.
- Robert William Prescott founded the first scheduled cargo airline in America, named the Flying Tiger Line.
- Allen Bert Christman, who bailed out at Rangoon, was strafed and killed while parachuting to the ground in January 1942, had earlier scripted and drawn the Scorchy Smith and Sandman comic strips.
- Harry R. Bolster had one air-to-air victory with the 2nd Squadron AVG. He returned to the US Army Air Force and was killed flying an experimental Fisher XP-75 at Eglin Field, Florida, October 10, 1944.
- Journalist Joseph Alsop served as Chennault's "staff secretary" while the AVG trained at Rangoon; he was interned at Hong Kong on Christmas Day, 1941.
- Nurse Rebecca Chan Chung served under Lieutenant Colonel Dr. Fred P. Manget in Kunming, China. She was recruited by Colonel Dr. Thomas Gentry.

=== Aces ===
Nineteen pilots were credited by the AVG with five or more air-to-air victories:

- Robert Neale: 13 victories
- David Lee "Tex" Hill: 12.25 victories (plus another 6 post-Tigers)
- Ed Rector: 10.5 victories
- George Burgard: 10 victories
- Robert Little: 10 victories
- Charles Older: 10 victories
- Robert T. Smith: 8.9 victories
- William McGarry: 8 victories
- Roger Pryor: 8 victories
- Charles Bond: 7 victories
- Frank Lawlor: 7 victories
- John V. "Scarsdale Jack" Newkirk: 7 victories
- Gregory "Pappy" Boyington: 6 victories
- Robert Hedman: 6 victories
- James H. Howard: 6 victories (6 more in the European Theater)
- C. Joseph Rosbert: 6 victories
- J. Richard Rossi: 6.25 victories
- Robert Prescott: 5.5 victories
- Percy Bartelt: 5 victories
- William Bartling: 5 victories
- John Garrity: 5 victories
- Edmund Overend: 5 victories
- Robert Sandell: 5 victories
- Robert H. Smith: 5 victories

== Legacy ==
=== Transition to the USAAF ===
The success of the AVG led to negotiations in spring 1942 to induct it into the USAAF. Chennault was reinstated as a colonel and immediately promoted to brigadier general commanding U.S. Army air units in China (initially designated China Air Task Force and later the 14th Air Force), while continuing to command the AVG by virtue of his position in the Chinese Air Force. On 4 July 1942, the AVG was replaced by the 23rd Fighter Group. Most AVG pilots refused to remain with the unit as a result of the strong arm tactics by the USAAF general sent to negotiate with them. However, five pilots accepted commissions in China including "Tex" Hill, one of Chennault's most loyal devotees, with others remaining for a two-week transition period. (U.S. airmen and the press continued to use the "Flying Tiger" name to refer to USAAF units in China to the end of the war, and the name continues to be applied to certain air force and army aviation squadrons.) Most AVG pilots became transport pilots in China, went back to America into civilian jobs, or rejoined the military services and fought elsewhere in the war.

One of the pilots drawn to the success of the AVG was Robert Lee Scott, Jr. who was flying supplies into Kunming over the Hump from India. He convinced Chennault to loan him a P-40 which he flew to protect the supply route; his aggressiveness led to Chennault's recruiting him as commander of the 23rd Fighter Group. Scott brought recognition to his exploits and those of the Flying Tigers with his 1943 bestselling autobiography God is My Co-Pilot that was then made by Warner Bros. into a popular film in 1945.

=== Tributes and memorials ===
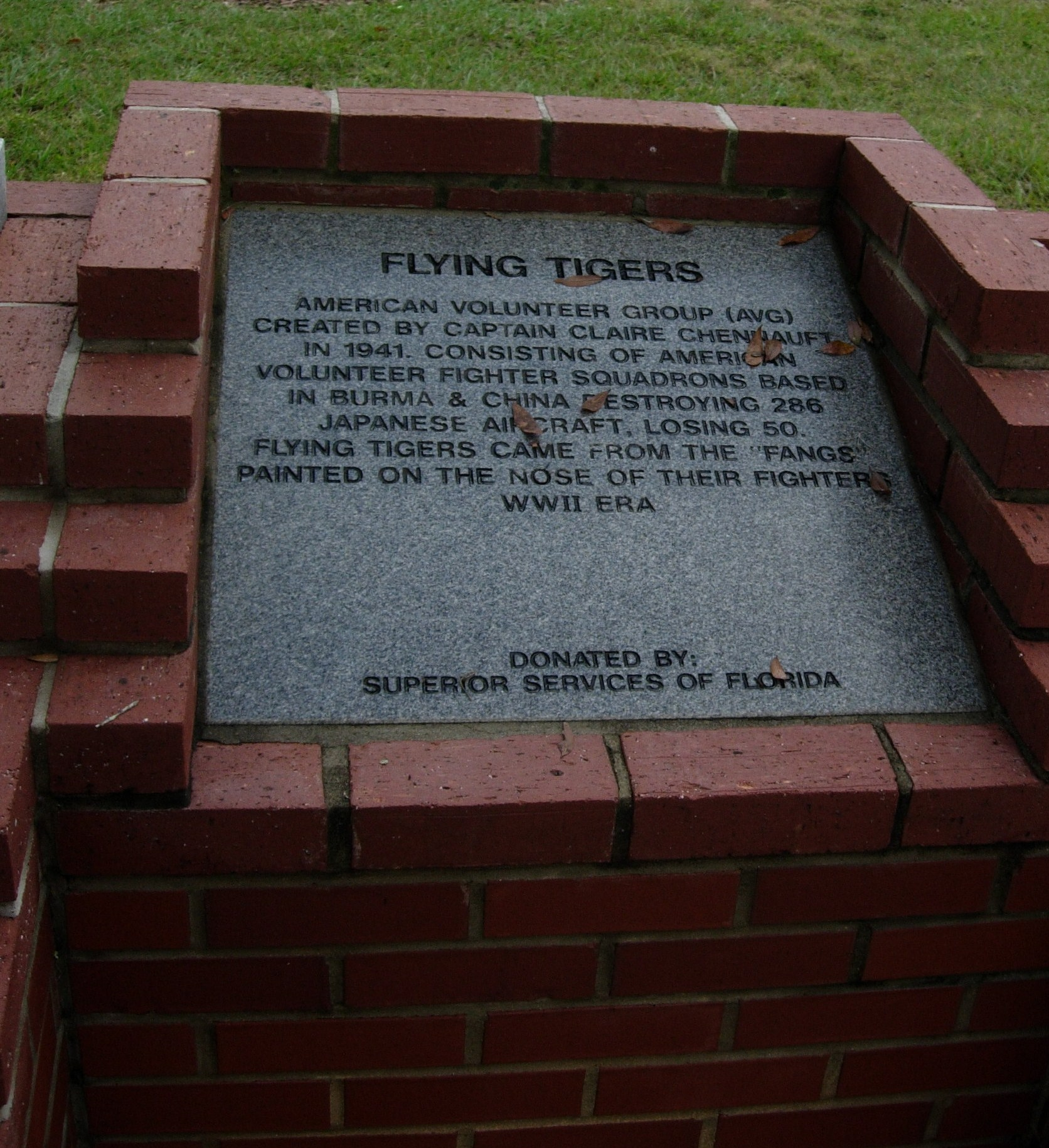
Flying Tigers Monument Ocala, Florida Memorial Park

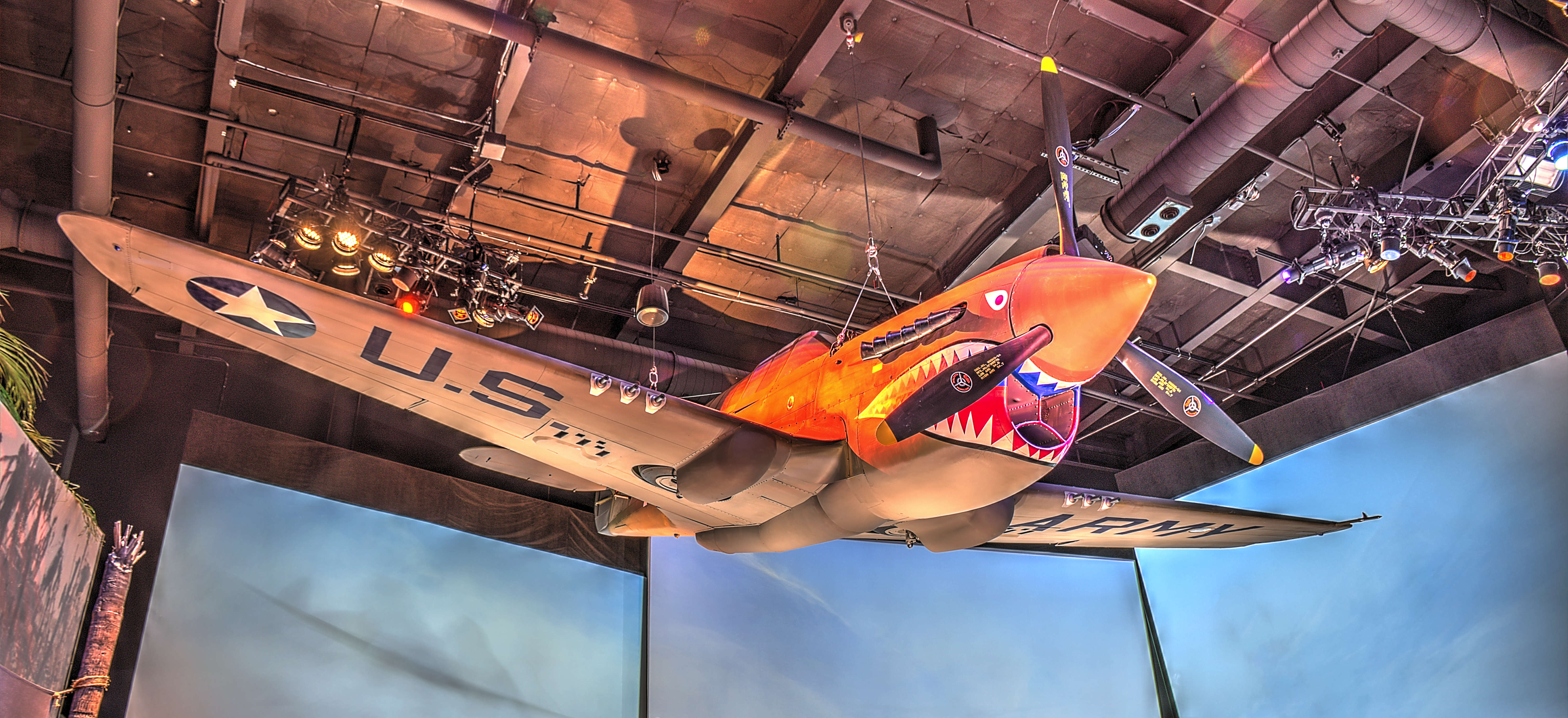
Restored P-40 on display at the National World War II Museum

There are several museum displays in the United States honoring the Flying Tigers. The National Museum of the United States Air Force in Dayton, Ohio, has an extensive display dedicated to the AVG, including an A-2 jacket worn by an AVG pilot in China, a banner presented to the AAF by the Chinese government, and a P-40E. The National Museum of Naval Aviation in Pensacola, Florida also has a Flying Tiger display. The Chennault Aviation Museum in Monroe, Louisiana, has an extensive collection of Flying Tigers and AVG memorabilia. The AVG monument in the National Museum of the United States Air Force Memorial Garden features a marble sculpture of a pagoda crowned with a brass model of a P-40; the monument stands nearly 14 feet tall. The Palm Springs Air Museum has a display of memorabilia inside a mockup of AVG ground facilities, with a P-40N painted in AVG markings. Finally, a memorial to the AVG and 14th AF is located at Vandenberg Air Force Base in California, depicting a P-40 in AVG markings with a bronze plaque describing the unit's history and Vandenberg's role as headquarters for the 14th AF.

There are also several memorials to the AVG in Asia. In Chiang Mai, Thailand, a marble obelisk was dedicated on 11 November 2003, inscribed to Chennault; to Jack Newkirk, who was killed in North Thailand on 24 March 1942; and to Charles Mott and William McGarry, who were shot down and captured in Thailand. In Taiwan, Madame Chiang Kai-Shek requested a statue of Chennault in the New Park of Taipei to commemorate this wartime friend after his death (the statue has since been relocated to Hualian AFB). A Flying Tigers Memorial is located in the village of Zhijiang, Hunan Province, China and there is a museum dedicated exclusively to the Flying Tigers. The building is a steel and marble structure, with wide sweeping steps leading up to a platform with columns holding up the memorial's sweeping roof; on its back wall, etched in black marble, are the names of all members of the AVG, 75th Fighter Squadron, and 14th Air Force who died in China. In 2005, the city of Kunming held a ceremony memorializing the history of the Flying Tigers in China, and on 20 December 2012, the Flying Tigers Museum opened in Kunming. The date is the 71st anniversary of the first combat from Kunming of the Flying Tigers. The Memorial Cemetery to Anti-Japanese Aviator Martyrs in Nanjing, China features a wall listing the names of Flying Tiger pilots and other pilots who defended China in World War II, and has several unmarked graves for such American pilots.

The largest private museum in China, Jianchuan Museum Cluster, devotes a wing in its military section to the history of the Flying Tigers, including a tribute wall featuring a thousand porcelain photos of members of the Flying Tigers as well as many historical artifacts from the era.

In March 2015, the Flying Tiger Heritage Park was opened in Guilin in collaboration with the Flying Tiger Historical Organization. The park is built on the site of Yangtang Airfield and includes a museum, aircraft shelters, and relics of a command post located in a cave.

=== Monroe legacy ===
General Chennault retired to Monroe, Louisiana. The University of Louisiana at Monroe changed its mascots to the "Warhawks" in his honor, and a micro-brewery named Flying Tiger Brewery opened in downtown Monroe in November 2016.

=== Flying Tigers wrecks ===
The wreckage of a P-40 with CAF serial number P-8115 is on display in Chiang Mai, Thailand. The aircraft is believed to be that flown by William "Mac" McGarry when he was hit by anti-aircraft fire while flying top cover over Chiang Mai on 24 March 1942. The aircraft crashed into the rain forest in northern Thailand. McGarry was captured and interrogated, and spent most of the war in a Thai prison. Toward the end of the war the Office of Strategic Services (OSS) arranged for the Free Thai Movement to spirit him out of the prison to a PBY Catalina in the Gulf of Thailand. The wreck of his P-40 was discovered in 1991, and consists of the P-40's Allison engine, Hamilton Standard propeller and parts of the airframe. Today the wreckage is displayed at the Tango Squadron Wing 41 Museum in Chiang Mai, Thailand.

The wreck of another AVG P-40 is believed to be in Lake Dianchi (Lake Kunming). The fighter is believed to be a P-40E piloted by John Blackburn when it crashed into the lake on a gunnery training flight on 28 April 1942, killing the pilot. His body was recovered from the aircraft, which was submerged in 20 feet of water. In 1997 a U.S.-Chinese group called the Sino-American Aviation Heritage Foundation was formed to locate the aircraft and possibly raise and restore it. In March 1998, they contacted the China Expedition Association about conducting the recovery operation. Over 300 aircraft are believed to have crashed into Lake Dianchi (including a second AVG P-40) so locating the aircraft proved difficult. In 2003, an aircraft believed to be Blackburn's was found embedded in nine feet of bottom silt. An effort was made in September 2005 to raise the aircraft, but the recovery was plagued with difficulties and it remains deep under the lake bottom. Since the aircraft was complete and relatively undamaged when John Blackburn's body was removed from it in 1942, it is hoped that the aircraft will be in good condition and capable of being restored, possibly to flying condition.

On 6 October 1944, the Flying Tigers engaged a Japanese squadron over southern Hunan and a P-40N was shot down. The local authorities assembled a rescue team to rush to the spot; upon arrival, the team found that the plane had been torn to pieces and the pilot was dead. A group of locals covered the pilot's body with a red cloth and carried it to the county township. After a mourning ceremony, he was buried and a gravestone erected for the locals to pay respect on Tomb-Sweeping Day. On 25 May 2005, an American organization seeking to document airmen lost in China during the war was warmly welcomed and helped by the local people. After three days work, the remains of the pilot and his aircraft were recovered and transported to Hawaii. DNA testing later confirmed the pilot as Second Lt. Robert Hoyle Upchurch of North Carolina, USA.

On 20 August 1943 A P-40N flown by Lt Morton Sher [killed] was shot down Xin Bai Village Hunan Providence. 82 years after his death he was reburied in South Carolina December 14, 2025.

=== Recognition by the United States ===
Just before their 50th reunion in 1992, the AVG veterans were retroactively recognized as members of the U.S. military services during the seven months the group was in combat against the Japanese. The AVG was then awarded a Presidential Unit Citation for "professionalism, dedication to duty, and extraordinary heroism." In 1996, the U.S. Air Force awarded the pilots the Distinguished Flying Cross and the ground crew were all awarded the Bronze Star Medal.

=== Censorship in mainland China ===
Discussion of the Flying Tigers has been censored in Chinese state media. During the 2026 state visit by Xi Jinping to the United States, U.S. president Donald Trump praised the Flying Tigers, which was removed from the Chinese government's transcript of the exchange.

=== Popular culture ===
A number of feature films have referenced the AVG directly or indirectly, the most famous being Flying Tigers, a 1942 black-and-white film from Republic, starring John Wayne and John Carroll as fighter pilots. Other wartime films with an AVG angle included The Sky's the Limit (1943, starring Fred Astaire as a Flying Tiger ace on leave); Hers to Hold (1943, with Joseph Cotten); God is My Co-Pilot, (1945, with Dennis Morgan as Robert Lee Scott, Raymond Massey as Chennault, and John Ridgely as Tex Hill); and China's Little Devils (1945).

The recent scholar Li Rong argues that during and after the war Americans perceived the Flying Tigers as "proof of U.S. benevolence and superiority" and "helped many Americans regain confidence and assure their identities as racially and technologically superior people", a process that took attention away from AVG flyers' misconduct and minimized Chinese contributions.

The two lead characters of the television series Tales of the Gold Monkey, Jake Cutter and Corky, were formerly members of the Flying Tigers, the former a pilot and the latter a mechanic. Several episodes featured flashbacks or characters from their time with the AVG.

Similarly, the Flying Tigers have been the focus of several novels, including Tonya, by Pappy Boyington; Remains, by Daniel Ford; Spies in the Garden, by Bob Bergin, Tiger Ten by William D. Blankenship, Wings of a Flying Tiger and Will of a Tiger, both written by Dr. Iris Yang. Tiger, Lion, Hawk, a novel for younger readers, was written by Earle Rice Jr. The Star Wars reference book The Essential Guide to Warfare features an X-wing starfighter squadron named the "Lightspeed Panthers". Co-author Paul R. Urquhart confirmed in the book's endnotes that the squadron was intended to be a direct reference to the Flying Tigers. Flying Tigers: Shadows Over China, a 2017 video game developed and published by Ace Maddox, is based on the Flying Tigers.

The Air Force Falcons football team saluted the Chinese military and the United States Navy and Marine Corps by wearing special Flying Tigers uniforms, including sharktooth designs on the helmets, for two games during the 2016 college football season. The team first wore the uniform for its 10 September game against Georgia State, and again for the Arizona Bowl against South Alabama.

In the Corps of Cadets at Texas A&M University (a senior military college), Squadron 6, an Air Force outfit, is nicknamed the "Flying Tigers". A campusology (or fun fact to be memorized), which is unique to Squadron 6 alone, tells of the military history of the unit and how members of Squadron 6 carry on the unit's legacy.

== See also ==
=== About China in World War II ===
- Air warfare in the Second Sino-Japanese War
- Arthur Chin, America's first ace in World War II
- Development of Chinese Nationalist air force (1937–45)
- Soviet Volunteer Group
- Chinese Expeditionary Force (Burma)
- China Burma India Theater
- India China Division, who flew supplies to China over the eastern Himalayas ("The Hump")

=== Similar or related American units ===
- 23rd Fighter Group, a USAF group descended from Flying Tigers
- 229th Aviation Regiment, a US Army Regiment designated the Flying Tigers in 1988
- Eagle Squadrons, American volunteers in the RAF during World War II
- Lafayette Escadrille, American volunteers in the French Air Service during World War I
- Kościuszko Squadron, American volunteers fighting for Poland in the Polish-Soviet War (1919–1921).
- Yankee Squadron, American volunteers fighting in the Spanish Civil War (1936–1939) on the Republican side.
