= Tex Hill =

United States Air Force general

David Lee Hill
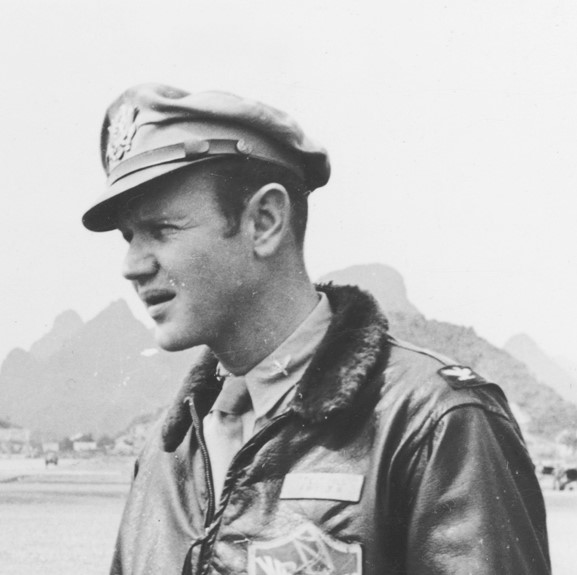
- Colonel "Tex" Hill in 1944
- Born: July 13, 1915; Gwangju, Korea under Japanese rule (now South Korea)
- Died: October 11, 2007 (aged 92); Terrell Hills, Texas, United States
- Military career
- Allegiance: United States
- Branch: United States Navy; Republic of China Air Force; United States Army Air Forces; United States Air Force Reserve
- Service years: 1939–1968
- Rank: Brigadier General
- Nickname: "Tex"
- Unit: Flying Tigers
- Commands: 58th Fighter Wing; 412th Fighter Group; 23rd Fighter Group; 1st Proving Ground Group; 75th Fighter Squadron
- Conflicts: World War II; Korean War
- Awards: Distinguished Service Cross; Legion of Merit; Distinguished Flying Cross (3); Air Medal (2); Order of the Cloud and Banner (China); Distinguished Flying Cross (United Kingdom)

David Lee "Tex" Hill (July 13, 1915 – October 11, 2007) was an American fighter pilot and triple flying ace. He is credited with 12 1/4 victories as a squadron leader with the Flying Tigers and another six as an officer in the United States Army Air Corps in World War II. He retired as a brigadier general.

== Early life ==
He was born in Gwangju, Korea (then under Japanese rule), the youngest of four children of Presbyterian missionaries. The family returned to the United States when he was 15 months old. They eventually settled in San Antonio, Texas, where his father was the minister of the First Presbyterian Church.

"Tex" graduated from Texas Military Institute, San Antonio, Texas, in 1928 and from McCallie School in Chattanooga, Tennessee, in 1934. While attending McCallie, he won the Tennessee Middleweight Championship in boxing in 1934. Tex then attended Texas A&M for two years before transferring to Austin College, from which he graduated in 1938. He was also a founding member of the Phi Sigma Alpha fraternity in 1932.

Hill's first flight occurred at Winburn Field, when Marion P. Hair took Tex and a friend up in his Travel Air 4000. The boys had snuck out of church one Sunday, and paid for the flight with their collection money.

== Military career ==
After graduating from Austin College in 1938, Hill enlisted in the United States Navy. Ensign Hill earned his wings as a Naval Aviator in November 1939 and joined the fleet as a TBD Devastator torpedo bomber pilot aboard the USS Saratoga, before joining a Vought SB2U Vindicator dive bomber squadron aboard USS Ranger.

=== World War II ===
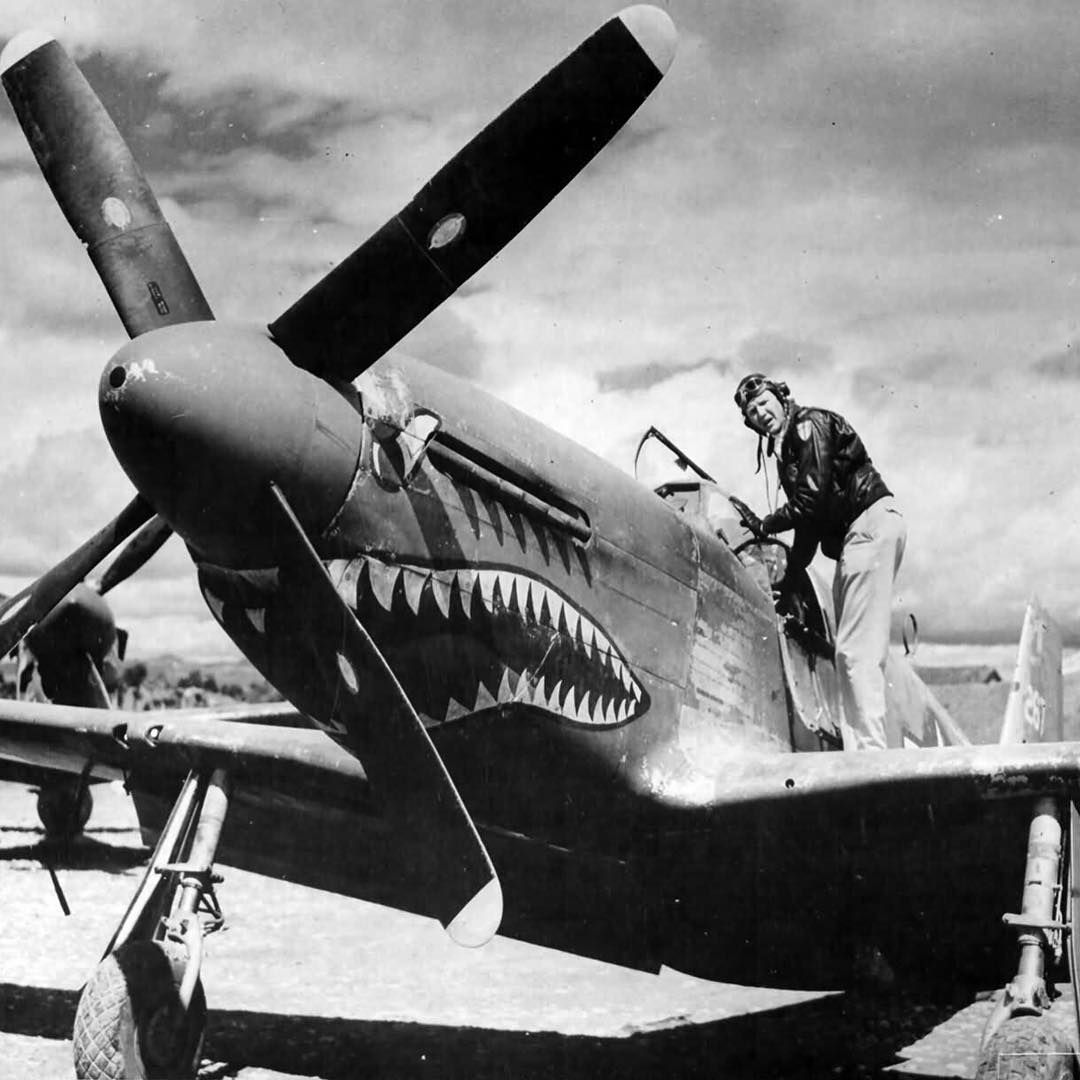
Hill climbs aboard his P-51 Mustang

In 1941, he was recruited with other Navy, Army and Marine Corps pilots to join the 1st American Volunteer Group (AVG), better known by its later nickname of the Flying Tigers. He sailed from San Francisco under a fake passport and arrived at Rangoon, Burma, on September 15, 1941. He learned to fly the P-40 in the AVG training program in Burma, and did well as a fighter pilot in the 2nd Pursuit Squadron (the "Panda Bears") as a flight leader and then squadron commander, becoming one of the top aces under the tutelage of Claire Chennault.

Hill made his first kills on January 3, 1942, when he downed two Nates over the Japanese airfield at Tak, Thailand. He shot down two more on January 23, and became an ace the next day when he shot down a fighter and a bomber over Rangoon. In March, he succeeded Jack Newkirk as squadron leader of the Second Squadron. By the time the AVG was disbanded in the summer of 1942, Hill was a double ace, credited with 12 1/4 victories.

On May 7, 1942, the Japanese Army began building a pontoon bridge across the Salween River, which would allow them to move troops and supplies into China. To stem this tide, squadron leader Hill led a flight of four new P-40Es bombing and strafing into the mile-deep gorge. During the next four days, the AVG pilots flew continuous missions into the gorge, effectively neutralizing the Japanese forces. From that day on, the Japanese never advanced further than the west bank of the Salween. Claire Chennault would later write of these critical missions, "The American Volunteer Group had staved off China's collapse on the Salween."

On Thanksgiving Day 1943, he led a force of 12 B-25s, 10 P-38s, and 8 new P-51s from Saichwan, China, on the first strike against Formosa. The Japanese had 100 bombers and 100 fighters at Shinchiku Airfield, and the bombers were landing as Hill's force arrived. The enemy managed to get seven fighters airborne, but they were promptly shot down. Forty-two Japanese airplanes were destroyed, and twelve more were probably destroyed in the attack. The American force returned home with no casualties.

After the deactivation of the Flying Tigers in July 1942, Hill was one of only five Flying Tigers to join its United States Army Air Forces (USAAF) successor, the 23rd Fighter Group, with the rank of major. He activated the 75th Fighter Squadron and later commanded the 23rd Fighter Group as a colonel. Before returning to the states in late 1944, Hill and his P-51 downed another six Japanese aircraft.

It is believed that he was the first to down a Zero with a P-51. Altogether, Hill was credited with destroying 18.25 enemy aircraft. The .25 kills comes from an assist; he and 3 other pilots worked together to shoot down a Japanese Nate fighter.

=== Post war ===
In 1944, Hill returned to the U.S. and took command of the 412th Fighter Group, America's first operational jet fighter group flying the P-59 Airacomet and the P-80 Shooting Star. He separated from active service in the USAAF in 1945.

Postwar, in July 1946, Hill was asked by Texas Governor Coke Stevenson to activate and accept command of the 136th Fighter Group of the Texas Air National Guard. Hill activated Guard units throughout the Gulf Coast and became the youngest brigadier general in the history of the Air National Guard. During the Korean War, he served with the Texas Air National Guard.

He ended his military career in the Air Force Reserve, retiring as a brigadier general.

== Later life ==
In 1999, Hill was inducted into the Texas Aviation Hall of Fame located at the Lone Star Flight Museum in Houston, Texas. He was inducted into the National Aviation Hall of Fame in 2006.

In 2002, he was conveyed an honorary lifetime membership in the U.S. Air Force Auxiliary (Civil Air Patrol) with a squadron of the CAP named in his honor—the Tex Hill Composite Squadron, of San Marcos, TX (SWR-TX-435). This squadron went on to become the third largest CAP squadron in the nation and in 2003 became the most decorated CAP squadron in the nation receiving the Texas Squadron of Merit, Texas Emergency Services Squadron of the Year, Regional (SW Region of the USA) Squadron of Distinction, and National Squadron of Distinction.

Hill died at the age of ninety-two on October 11, 2007, in Terrell Hills, Texas, of congestive heart failure. More than 2,000 people attended his funeral. He was buried at nearby Fort Sam Houston National Cemetery.

On November 2, 2007, the National Museum of the Pacific War in Fredericksburg observed "Tex" Hill Day with speeches, patriotic music, and friends' memories of the fallen hero.

On November 2, 2008, the Air Force Heritage Flight at the Lackland AFB Air Show in San Antonio was dedicated to Hill. It consisted of an F-22, an F-15E, an F-16C, and a P-40 like the one Hill flew with the AVG.

Middle School 14 in San Antonio was named "Hill Middle School" after him in June 2013.

== Awards and decorations ==
During his career he was awarded the Distinguished Service Cross, Distinguished Flying Cross with two Oak Leaf Clusters, Presidential Unit Citation with Oak Leaf Cluster, Chinese Order of the Cloud and Banner 4th, 5th and 6th grades, 2-Star Wing Decorations, Chinese Victory Medal, Legion of Merit, and British Distinguished Flying Cross.

U.S. Air Force Command Pilot Badge
Distinguished Service Cross	Legion of Merit	Distinguished Flying Cross w/ 2 bronze oak leaf clusters
Air Medal w/ 1 bronze oak leaf cluster	Air Force Presidential Unit Citation w/ 1 bronze oak leaf cluster	American Defense Service Medal w/ 1 bronze campaign star
American Campaign Medal	Asiatic-Pacific Campaign Medal w/ 1 silver and bronze campaign stars	World War II Victory Medal
National Defense Service Medal	Air Force Longevity Service Award	Armed Forces Reserve Medal w/ silver hourglass device
Distinguished Flying Cross (United Kingdom)	Order of the Cloud and Banner (1st class) (Republic of China)	Order of the Cloud and Banner (4th class) (Republic of China)
Order of the Cloud and Banner (6th class) (Republic of China)	Army, Navy & Air Force Medal (Republic of China)	China War Memorial Medal (Republic of China)

=== Distinguished Service Cross ===

Hill, David Lee "Tex"
Major, U.S Army Air Forces
75th Fighter Squadron, 23d Fighter Group, Tenth Air Force
Date of Action: October 25, 1942
Department of the Army, General Orders No. 9 (November 18, 2005)

Citation:

The President of the United States of America takes pleasure in presenting the Distinguished Service Cross to Major (Air Corps) David Lee "Tex" Hill, United States Army Air Forces, for extraordinary heroism in connection with military operations against an armed enemy. Major Hill forced enemy aircraft to turn from the attack and dive away. He destroyed one aircraft and severely damaged three others.

== Personal life ==
Hill married Mazie Sale on March 27, 1943, two weeks after noticing her at the First Presbyterian Church in Victoria, Texas while on leave, recovering from malaria. They were together until his death.
