= Stephen J. Bonner Jr. =

American flying ace (1918–2021)

Stephen Jacob Bonner Jr.
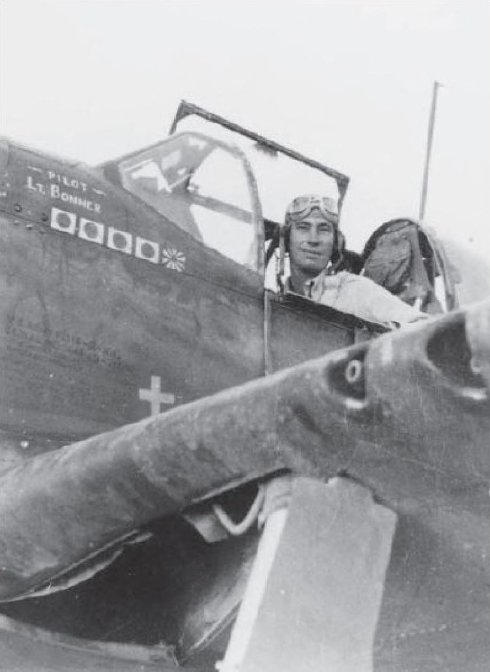
- Bonner onboard his P-51B Mustang
- Born: January 16, 1918; Guymon, Oklahoma, U.S.
- Died: September 15, 2021 (aged 103); Carlinville, Illinois, U.S.
- Military career
- Allegiance: United States of America
- Branch: United States Army Air Forces; United States Air Force
- Service years: 1942–early 1950s
- Rank: Major
- Nickname: Steve
- Units: 76th Fighter Squadron; 23rd Fighter Group
- Conflicts: World War II
- Awards: Distinguished Flying Cross (2)

Stephen Jacob Bonner Jr. (January 16, 1918 – September 15, 2021) was an American flying ace in the 23rd Fighter Group during World War II.

== Early life ==
Bonner was born on 1918 in Guymon, Oklahoma, to Stephen Jacob, Sr. and Nellie Belle Bonner. He graduated from Panhandle College in Goodwell, Oklahoma, before attending the University of Illinois. He developed an interest in flying after a pilot at a local airport would often take him up for an aerial flight.

== Military career ==
After joining the U.S. Army Reserve and later the Aviation Cadet Program, Bonner was commissioned as a second lieutenant and awarded his pilot wings at Eagle Pass Army Airfield in Texas on February 16, 1943.

=== World War II ===
In June 1943, he was assigned to the 76th Fighter Squadron of the 23rd Fighter Group in China, where he flew missions in the China Burma India Theater. Flying the P-40 Warhawks, Bonner scored his first aerial victories on July 23, 1943. On that day, the Imperial Japanese Army Air Service sent a mixed formation of bombers and fighters from Hankou to attack the cities of Hengyang and Lingling in Hunan Province. The P-40s intercepted the formation and in the aerial battle, they shot down five fighters and two bombers, with Bonner credited with one aerial victory.

He scored his second and third aerial victories on September 10, 1943, and December 12, 1943. He scored his fourth aerial victory on January 11, 1944, and on early 1944, the 76th FS converted to P-51B Mustang. On May 12, 1944, during an interception of the IJAAF bombing raid over Suichwan Airfield in Jiangxi Province, Bonner shot down a Nakajima Ki-43 "Oscar" that was strafing the airfield, crediting him with his fifth aerial victory and earning the title of flying ace.

During the war, he was credited in the destruction of five enemy aircraft in aerial combat (four in P-40 and one in P-51) and was twice awarded the Distinguished Flying Cross.

== Later life ==
Bonner and his wife Joy had three children; two sons and one daughter, and numerous grand and great-grandchildren.

After the end of World War II, Bonner continued to serve in the newly created United States Air Force until his retirement in the early 1950s, at the rank of major. After leaving military service, he worked as president of Flex-N-Gate Manufacturing Company in Urbana, Illinois, until his full retirement.

Bonner became an advocate for the commemoration of the legacy of Flying Tigers and China-United States dialogue, founding the Sino-American Aviation Heritage Foundation (SAAHF). In September 2005, Bonner was among the American WWII veterans invited to participate in the celebrations of the 60th anniversary of the Chinese victory during the Second Sino-Japanese War. He and 48 other American veterans were given the title 'Honorary Citizen' of the Chinese city of Kunming.

In 2015, he along with other flying aces received the Congressional Gold Medal, in recognition of "their heroic military service and defense of the country's freedom throughout the history of aviation warfare."

Bonner died on September 15, 2021, at the age of 103. He was buried at a family plot in Elmhurst Cemetery in Guymon, Oklahoma.
