= 75th Fighter Squadron =

Active US Air Force unit

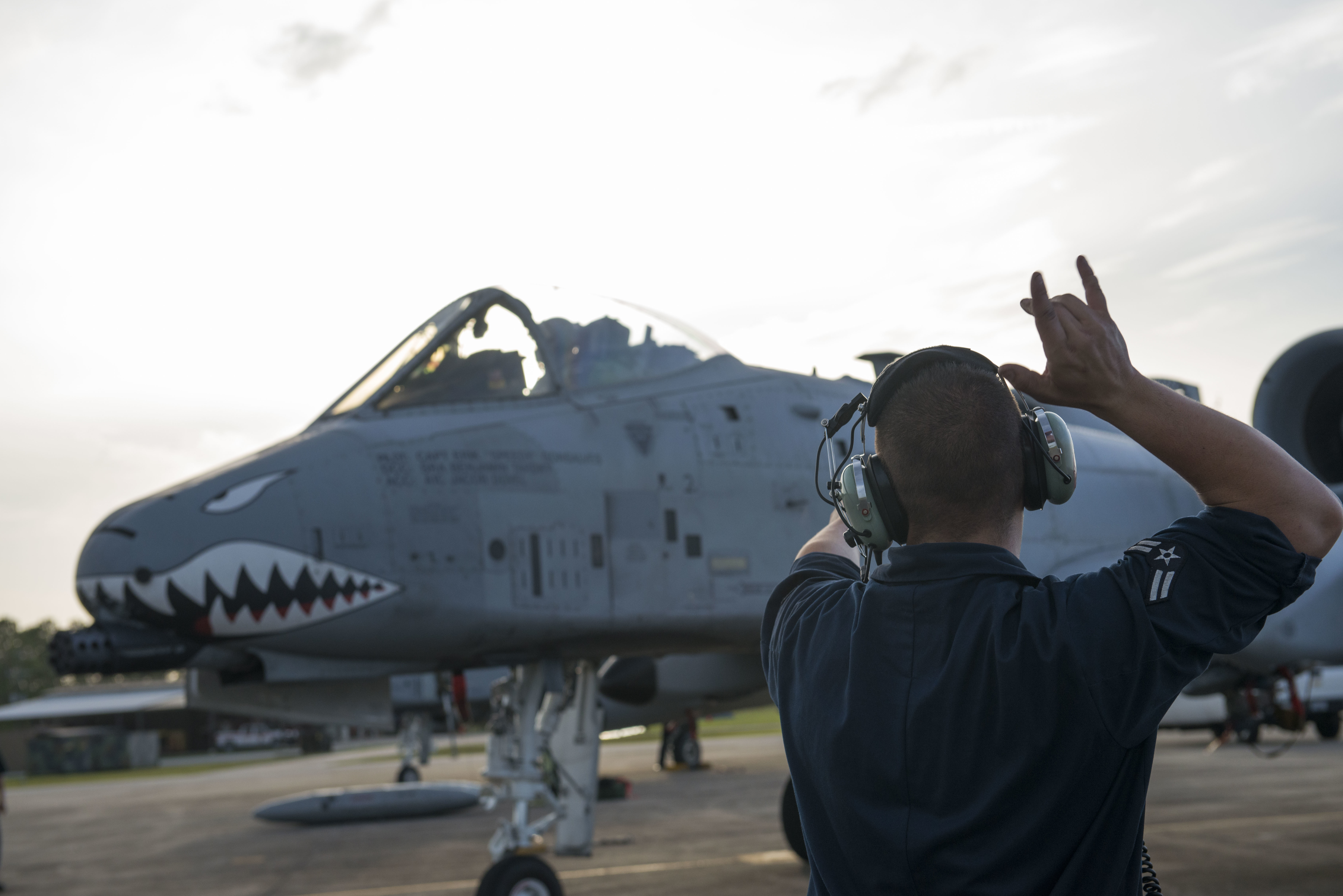
- A-10 Thunderbolt II of the 75th Fighter Squadron
- Active: 1942–1946; 1946-1949; 1951-1968; 1968–1969; 1972–1991; 1992-present
- Country: United States
- Branch: United States Air Force
- Role: Attack
- Part of: Air Combat Command; 15th Air Force; 23d Wing; 23d Fighter Group
- Garrison/HQ: Moody Air Force Base, Georgia
- Nickname: Tiger Sharks
- Motto: ATTACK!
- Engagements: Asia-Pacific Theater World War II 1991 Gulf War

- Decorations: Distinguished Unit Citation Air Force Meritorious Unit Award Air Force Outstanding Unit Award with Combat "V" Device Air Force Outstanding Unit Award

Commanders
- Current commander: Lt. Col Brooklynn "DART" Knight
- Notable commanders: Brigadier General David "Tex" Hill Major General John R. Allison Major Don L. Quigley Col Raymond "Donk" Strasburger

Insignia
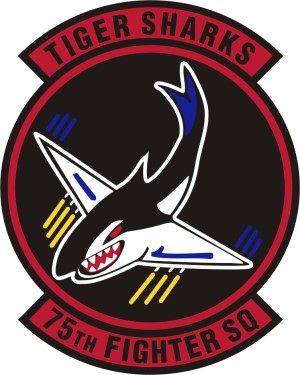
- 75th Fighter Squadron emblem (approved 9 August 2007)

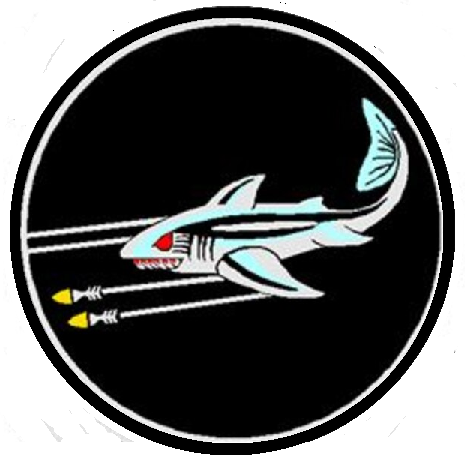
- 75th Fighter-Interceptor Squadron emblem (approved 27 February 1953

Aircraft flown
- Attack: A-10C

The 75th Fighter Squadron (75 FS) is a United States Air Force unit. It is assigned to the 23d Fighter Group, Air Combat Command and stationed at Moody Air Force Base, Georgia. The squadron is equipped with the Fairchild Republic A-10C Thunderbolt II attack aircraft.

During World War II, the 75th Fighter Squadron was one of the three original squadrons (74th, 75th, 76th) of the 23rd Fighter Group.

On 17 December 1941, the American Volunteer Group (AVG) 2nd Fighter Squadron was redesignated as the 23rd Pursuit Group 75th Pursuit Squadron and subsequently the 75th Fighter Squadron.

== History ==
=== World War II ===
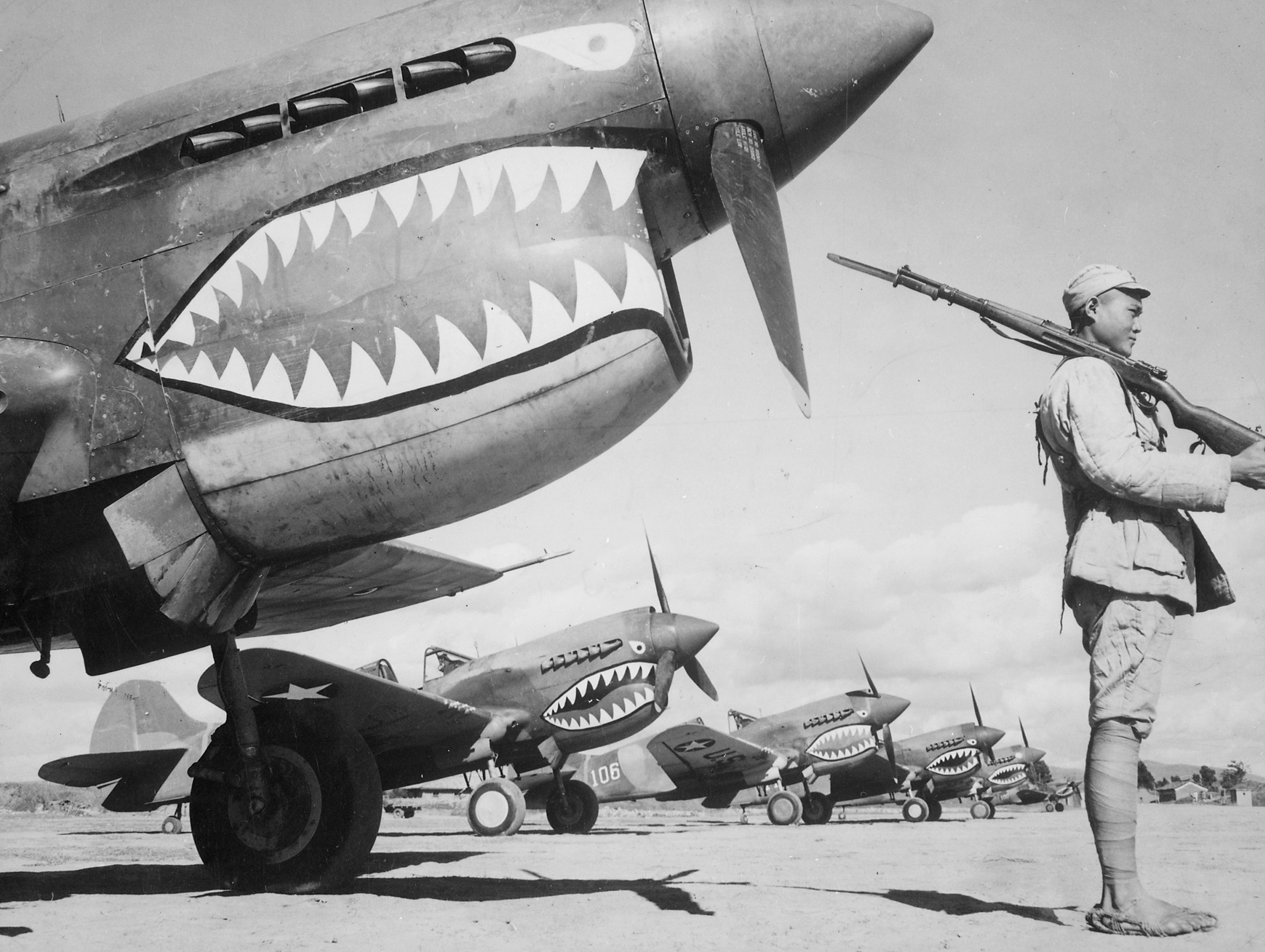
P-40 fighters of the Flying Tigers

The 75th Fighter Squadron's first assignment as an active unit was in the China-Burma-India theatre. Some members of the famous American Volunteer Group known as the "Flying Tigers" joined the 75th Fighter Squadron after the AVG was disbanded. This group of men, under the leadership of General Claire Lee Chennault, engaged in aerial combat against the Japanese very soon after 7 December 1941.

On the same day as its activation, the 75th scored its first major victory during a night interception flight against Japanese bombers. This was the first night interception ever attempted over the China theatre and gave the Japanese quite a shock. The intercepting pilots were credited with the destruction of two enemy bombers and two probables.

During the early days of its history, the 75th's mission was to attack and destroy the enemy by strafing airfields, troops, and supply depots, while maintaining air superiority so that the Japanese could not locate and bomb targets in China. Operating from numerous airfields within China, the 75th Fighter Squadron compiled an impressive record during World War II and received the Presidential Unit Citation. After World War II, the squadron returned to the United States and was stationed at Fort Lewis, Washington. There the squadron was inactivated on 5 January 1946.

=== Air Defense Command ===
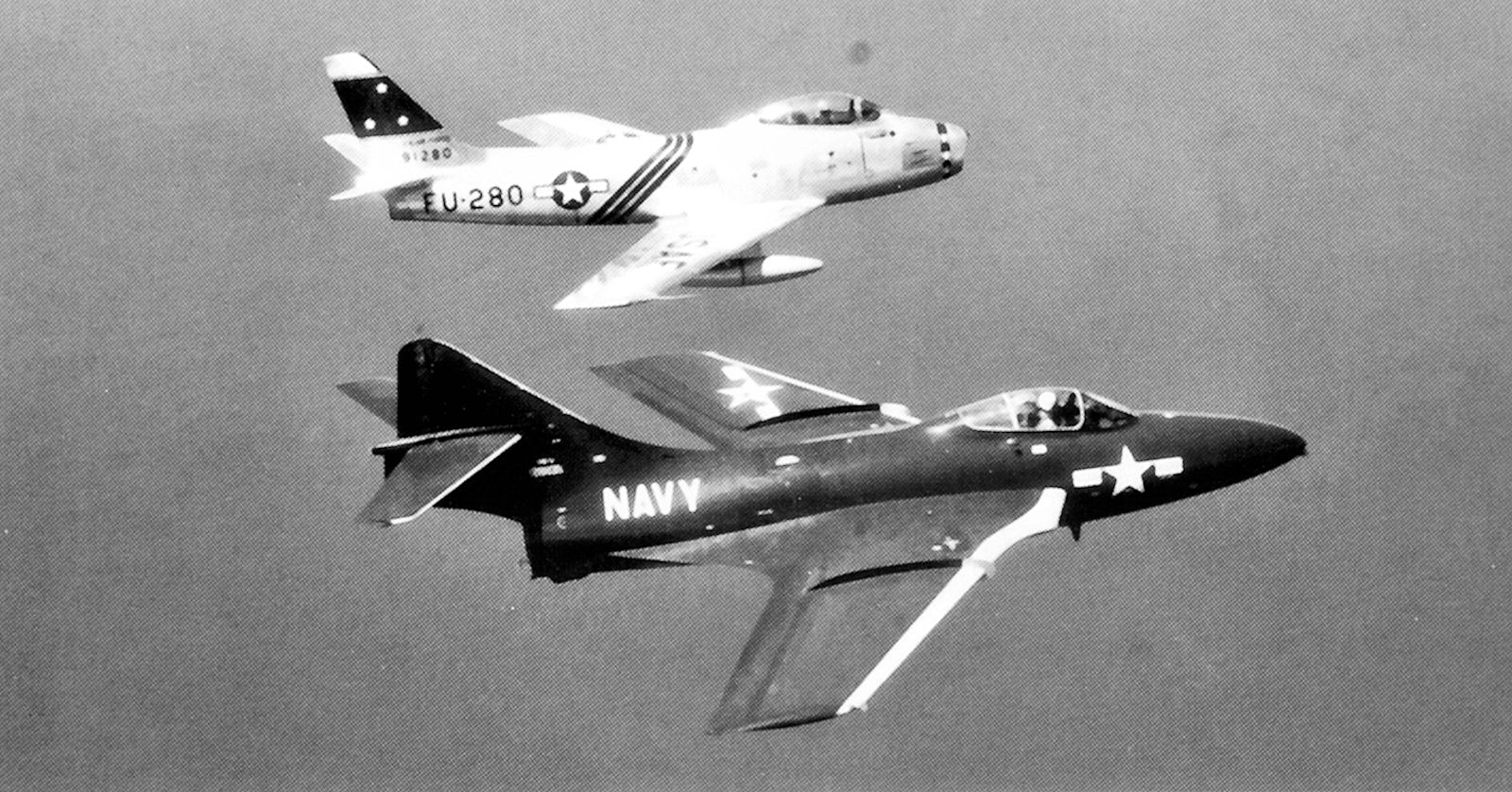
75th Fighter-Interceptor Squadron North American F-86A Sabre 49-1280 with a Navy Grumman F9F-6 Cougar over Long Island, 1952

Following a period of activations and inactivations, during which the squadron was assigned to such bases as Northwest Field, Guam, and Howard Air Force Base, Panama Canal Zone, the squadron returned to active duty on 12 January 1951 as the 75th Fighter-Interceptor Squadron stationed at Presque Isle Air Force Base, Maine. During this period, the 75th served under the Air Defense Command and flew the F-86 Sabre day interceptors with a mission to maintain a high degree of operational proficiency so that it might repel any possible enemy air attack. In December 1951, Virgil Ivan "Gus" Grissom was assigned to the 75th Fighter-Intercept Squadron. The squadron upgraded to the F-86D Sabre interceptor in 1953 at Suffolk County Air Force Base, New York, where the squadron remained for three years before moving to Dow Air Force Base, Maine.

Upon return to Maine in 1959 the squadron converted to the McDonnell F-101B Voodoo supersonic interceptor and the F-101F operational and conversion trainer. The two-seat trainer version was equipped with dual controls, but carried the same armament as the F-101B and were fully combat-capable. On 22 October 1962, before President John F. Kennedy told Americans that missiles were in place in Cuba, the squadron dispersed one third of its force, equipped with nuclear tipped missiles to Niagara Falls International Airport at the start of the Cuban Missile Crisis. These planes returned to Dow after the crisis.

The squadron remained at Dow Air Force Base until 1968 when it was transferred to Wurtsmith Air Force Base, Michigan. The squadron inactivated there on 30 November 1969 as part of the drawdown of ADC interceptor bases, the aircraft being passed along to the Air National Guard.

=== Tactical Air Command ===
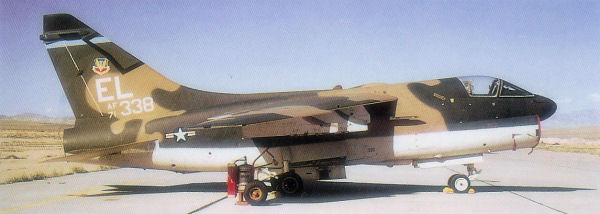
Ling-Temco-Vought A-7D Corsair II 71-0338 of the 75th Tactical Fighter Squadron in May 1973

On 18 May 1972, the squadron was redesignated the 75th Tactical Fighter Squadron, and on 1 July 1972 was activated at England Air Force Base, Louisiana. There the squadron began flying the A-7D Corsair II ground attack aircraft. It took part in a variety of operational exercises both in the United States and overseas, including tactical bombing competitions against the Royal Air Force at RAF Lossiemouth, Scotland, during October 1977 and July 1978.

It flew the A-7D until 1981 when conversion to the A-10 Thunderbolt II was completed. It became an A-10A training unit and remained at England AFB supporting the deployments of the 74th and 76th TFS including Operation DESERT SHIELD and DESERT STORM. On 2 December 1991, the 75th Fighter Squadron was inactivated as part of the conversion to the Objective Wing and drawdown of the Air Force after the end of the Cold War.

=== Modern era ===
On 3 April 1992, the squadron was again activated, as the 75th Fighter Squadron located at Pope Air Force Base, North Carolina. Received A/OA-10 Thunderbolt II aircraft transferred from the 353d Tactical Fighter Squadron at Myrtle Beach Air Force Base, South Carolina prior to the 353d's inactivation and the base's closure in January 1993.

The first operational deployment of a composite wing happened in October 1994, when Iraqi troops began massing near the Kuwaiti Border. Within 72 hours, the 75th Fighter Squadron redeployed to Ahmad al-Jaber Air Base, Kuwait, becoming the first U.S. fixed-wing aircraft to be stationed in that country since the end of the 1991 Gulf War.

The squadron moved to Moody AFB, Georgia in 2007 due to the Base Realignment and Closure (BRAC) panel recommendations. At the same time the unit received their newly upgraded A-10C fighters, which allow for greater employment guided munitions. On 19 December 2007, the last three of the A-10 Thunderbolt II aircraft left for Moody AFB and assumed its current mission.

==== 2013 Sequestration ====
Air Combat Command officials announced a stand down and reallocation of flying hours for the rest of the fiscal year 2013 due to mandatory budget cuts. The across-the board spending cuts, called sequestration, took effect 1 March when Congress failed to agree on a deficit-reduction plan.

Squadrons either stood down on a rotating basis or kept combat ready or at a reduced readiness level called "basic mission capable" for part or all of the remaining months in fiscal 2013. This affected the 75th Fighter Squadron with a reduction of its flying hours, placing it into a basic mission capable status from 5 April-30 July 2013.

=== War on Terror ===
The 75th Fighter Squadron has deployed several times in the battle against global terrorism. On 25 January 2019, the squadron returned from a six-month deployment in support of Operation Spartan Shield and Operation Freedom’s Sentinel. First to an undisclosed location in Southwest Asia for a series of exercises with friendly Middle Eastern air forces, then onto Kandahar Airfield in Afghanistan to fly close-air support missions in support of U.S. and Afghan forces.

== Lineage ==
- Constituted as the 75th Pursuit Squadron (Interceptor) on 17 December 1941

Redesignated 75th Fighter Squadron on 15 May 1942

- Activated on 4 July 1942

Redesignated 75th Fighter Squadron, Single Engine on 28 February 1944

- Inactivated on 5 January 1946
- Activated on 10 October 1946

Redesignated 75th Fighter Squadron, Jet on 3 May 1949

- Inactivated on 24 September 1949

Redesignated 75th Fighter-Interceptor Squadron on 19 December 1950

- Activated on 12 January 1951
- Discontinued and inactivated, on 30 June 1968
- Activated on 30 September 1968
- Inactivated on 30 November 1969

Redesignated 75th Tactical Fighter Squadron on 18 May 1972

- Activated on 1 July 1972

Redesignated 75th Fighter Squadron on 1 November 1991
Inactivated on 2 December 1991

- Activated on 1 April 1992

=== Assignments ===
- 23d Fighter Group, 4 July 1942 – 5 January 1946
- 23d Fighter Group, 10 October 1946 – 24 September 1949

Attached to 46th Fighter Wing, December 1947-16 Aug 1948

- 23d Fighter-Interceptor Group, 12 January 1951
- 4711th Defense Wing, 6 February 1952
- 4709th Defense Wing, 14 October 1952
- 519th Air Defense Group, 16 February 1953
- 23d Fighter Group, 18 August 1955
- Bangor Air Defense Sector, 1 July 1959
- 36th Air Division, 1 April 1966 – 30 June 1968
- 34th Air Division, 30 September 1968 – 30 November 1969
- 23d Tactical Fighter (later, 23d Fighter) Wing, 1 July 1972 – 2 December 1991
- 23d Fighter Wing, 1 April 1992
- 23d Operations (later, 23 Fighter) Group, 1 June 1992 – present

=== Stations ===
- Hengyang Airport, China, 4 July 1942
- Chanyi Airfield, China, 17 August 1942
- Yunani Airfield, China, 20 January 1943
- Lingling Airport, China, 31 March 1943
- Kunming Airport, China, 26 April 1943
- Kweilin Airfield, China, 11 October 1943
- Hengyang Airport, China, c. November 1943
- Luliang Airfield, China, 10 June 1944
- Kweilin Airfield, China, 25 June 1944
- Luliang Airfield, China, 12 September 1944
- Luichow Airfield, China, August 1945
- Hangchow Airfield, China, 10 October 1945 – 10 December 1945
- Fort Lewis, Washington, 3 January 1946 – 5 January 1946
- North Guam Air Force Base, Guam, 10 October 1946 – 3 April 1949
- Howard Air Force Base, Panama Canal Zone, 25 April 1949 – 24 September 1949
- Presque Isle Air Force Base, Maine, 12 January 1951
- Suffolk County Air Force Base, New York, 16 October 1952
- Presque Isle Air Force Base, Maine, 18 August 1955
- Dow Air Force Base, Maine, 25 June 1959 – 30 June 1968
- Wurtsmith Air Force Base, Michigan, 30 September 1968 – 30 November 1969
- England Air Force Base, Louisiana, 1 July 1972 – 2 December 1991
- Pope Air Force Base, North Carolina, 1 April 1992
- Moody Air Force Base, Georgia, 30 July 2007 – present

=== Aircraft ===
- P-40 Warhawk (1942–1944)
- P-51 Mustang (1944–1945)
- P-47 Thunderbolt (1946–1949)
- RF-80 Shooting Star (1949)
- F-86E Sabre (1951)
- F-86A Sabre (1951-1953)
- F-86D Sabre Interceptor (1953–1955)
- F-89D Scorpion (1955–1959)
- F-101B Voodoo (1958–1968, 1968–1969)
- A-7D Corsair II (1972–1981)
- A-10 Thunderbolt II (1980–1991, 1992–present)
- Lockheed Martin F-35A Lighting II, 2029–
