= CATF =

CATF may refer to:

- China Air Task Force
- Contemporary American Theater Festival
