= 476th Fighter Group =

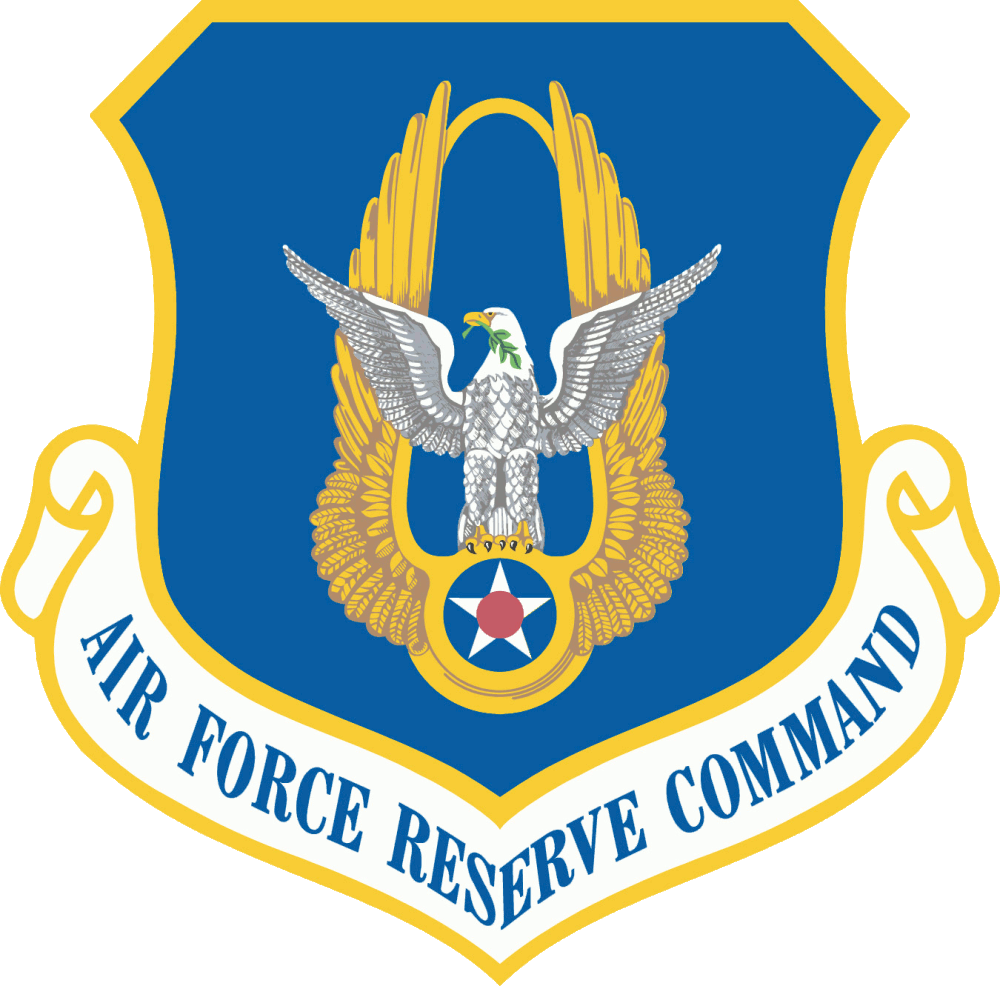
476th Fighter Group

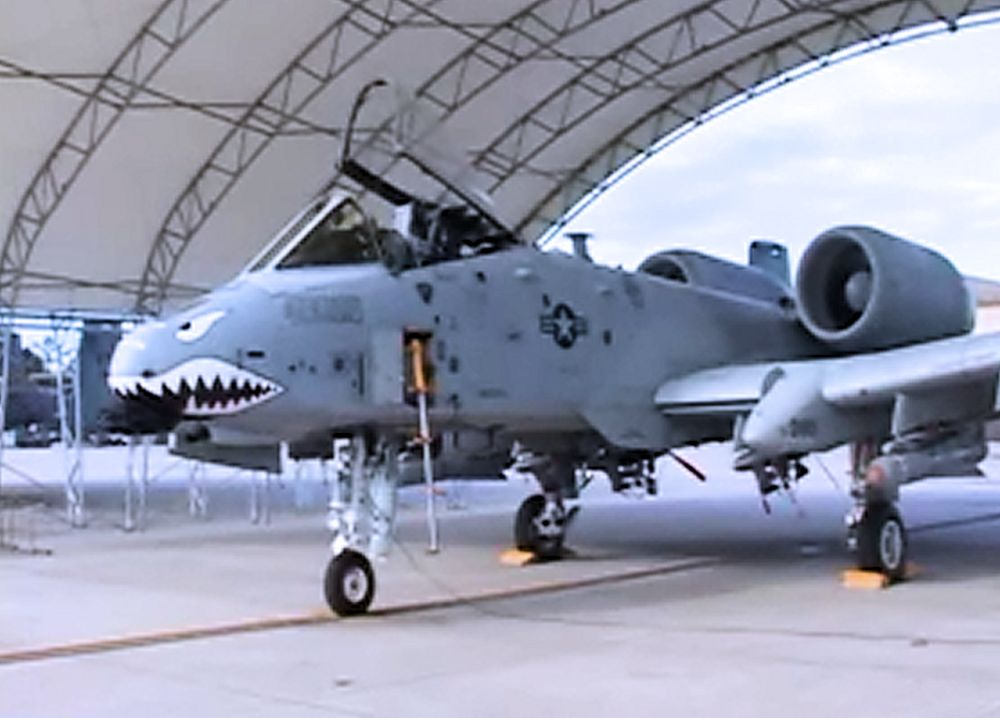
- 476th Fighter Group – A-10 Thunderbolt II
- Active: 1943–1943; 1943–1944; 1957–1960; 2009–present
- Country: United States
- Branch: United States Air Force
- Type: Group
- Role: Fighter/Attack
- Part of: Air Force Reserve Command
- Garrison/HQ: Moody Air Force Base, Georgia

Commanders
- Current commander: Colonel Brett Waring

Insignia
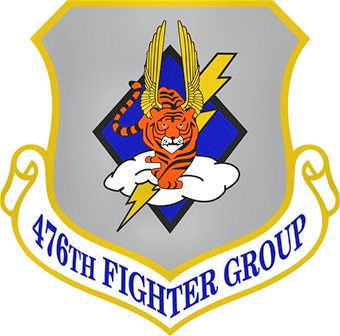
- 476th Fighter Group emblem (Note: Approved 18 May 2010.)
- Tail code: FT

Aircraft flown
- Attack: A-10 Thunderbolt II

The 476th Fighter Group is an Air Reserve Componentunit of the United States Air Force. It is part of the Tenth Air Force (10 AF) of Air Force Reserve Command, stationed at Moody Air Force Base, Georgia. If mobilized to active duty, the group is gained by the Air Combat Command (ACC).

The group was active twice during World War II for brief periods, the first time in China as part of Fourteenth Air Force and the second time in the United States as a training unit.

In the late 1950s the group was activated to open Glasgow Air Force Base, Montana, but the role of Glasgow shifted to the support of Strategic Air Command (SAC)'s nuclear strike force and the group was inactivated in April 1960 and its assets transferred to SAC.

The group was most recently activated as a reserve associate unit in 2009.

== Overview ==
The group is assigned to the 442d Fighter Wing, at Whiteman Air Force Base, Missouri. The 476th Fighter Group is an Air Force Reserve associate unit linked to the active duty 23d Fighter Group at Moody Air Force Base, Georgia. The 442 oversees the 476th's administrative and mission-support needs not provided by Moody's host active duty wing, the 23rd Wing.

The group works under its own command structure but integrates its operations with the 23d Wing's 74th and 75th Fighter Squadrons and 23d Maintenance Group. The group has approximately 115 airmen consisting of traditional reservists (TR), air reserve technicians (ART) and civilians. Eventually, the 476th will grow to about 230 traditional reservists and full-time ART personnel, including 20 in the 76th Fighter Squadron, 160 in the 476th Maintenance Squadron and 23 in the medical flight. The remaining airmen will serve on the group staff.

The 476 Fighter Group consists of the following units:

- 76th Fighter Squadron (A-10C, Tail code: FT)
- 476th Maintenance Squadron
- 476th Aerospace Medical Flight

== History ==
=== World War II ===
The 476th Fighter Group was activated in China on 19 May 1943 and assigned to Fourteenth Air Force, but the group was never made operational and was disbanded two months later.

The group was reconstituted and activated at Richmond Army Air Base, Virginia on 1 December 1943 as a First Air Force Replacement Training Unit (RTU). It was assigned the 453d Fighter Squadron, which had been activated ten days earlier, and the newly activated 541st, 542d, and 543d Fighter Squadrons. RTUs were oversized units which trained aircrews prior to their deployment to combat theaters.

However, as the 476th was being organized at Richmond, the Army Air Forces was finding found that standard military units, based on relatively inflexible tables of organization, were proving less well adapted to the training mission. Accordingly, a more functional system was adopted in which each base was organized into a separate numbered unit, while the groups and squadrons acting as RTUs were disbanded or inactivated. As a result, the 476th and its squadrons apparently never became operational at Richmond. Instead, the 476th was moved to Pocatello Army Air Field in late March 1944, where it was disbanded and its personnel and equipment was used to form the 265th AAF Base Unit (Replacement Training Unit Fighter).

=== Air Defense ===
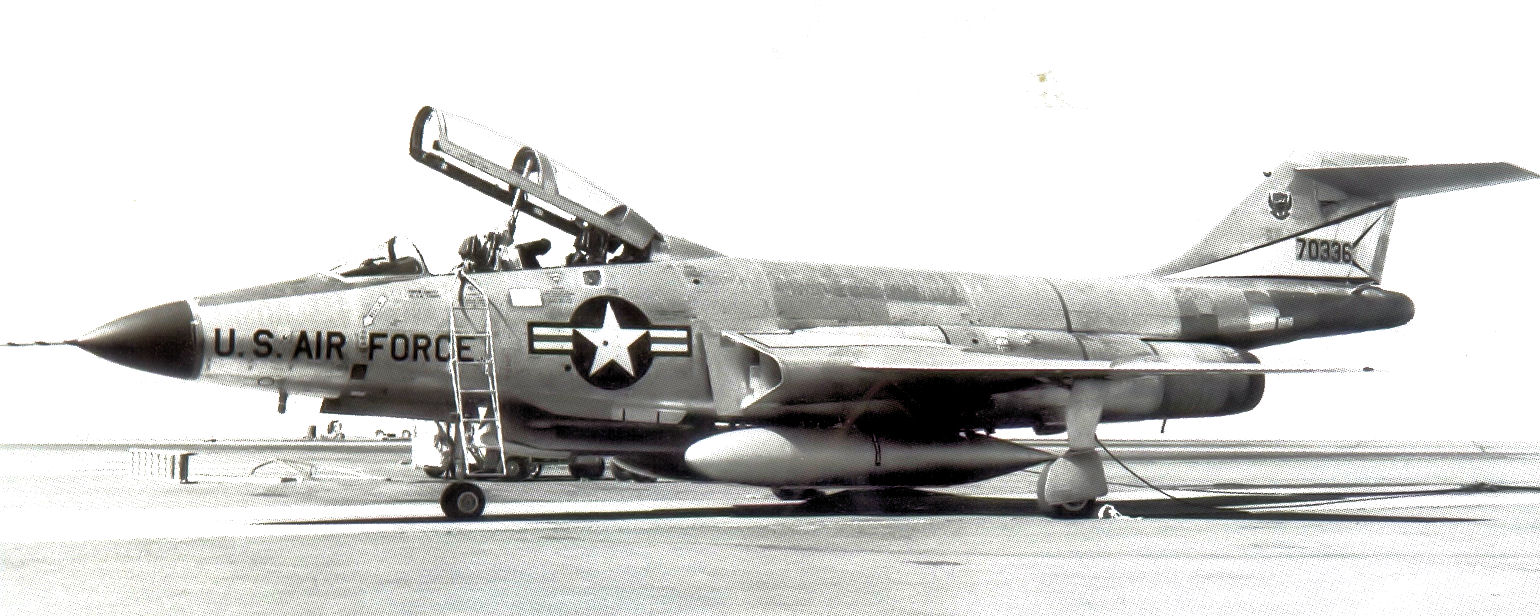
13th Fighter-Interceptor Squadron McDonnell F-101B 57-0336 at Glasgow AFB

The group was reconstituted again as the 476th Fighter Group (Air Defense) and activated on 8 February 1957 as part of Air Defense Command. The group was involved in activation of Glasgow AFB, Montana, but did not operate as a separate unit until 9 March 1959. On 2 July the 13th Fighter-Interceptor Squadron moved to Glasgow from Sioux City Municipal Airport and began to work up with McDonnell F-101 Voodoo interceptors. The group remained involved with training air defense crews until it was inactivated on 1 April 1960. On that day Strategic Air Command assumed control of Glasgow and the personnel and equipment of the 476th Group and its support units were transferred to SAC to organize the 4141st Combat Support Group and the 476th units were inactivated. The 13th FIS was reassigned directly to the 29th Air Division.

SAC had organized the 4141st Strategic Wing at Glasgow in the fall of 1958 as a tenant unit. As it became apparent that the SAC mission would be the predominant one at Glasgow, the base was transferred to SAC and the ADC units there became tenants.

=== Air Force Reserve ===
The group stood up as an Air Force Reserve Command associate unit equipped with A-10 Thunderbolt IIs and linked to the 23d Fighter Group in July 2009.

== Lineage ==
- Constituted as the 476th Fighter Group on 20 April 1943

Activated on 19 May 1943
Disbanded on 31 July 1943

- Reconstituted on 11 October 1943

Activated on 1 December 1943
Disbanded on 1 April 1944.

- Reconstituted and redesignated 476th Fighter Group (Air Defense) on 11 December 1956

Activated on 8 February 1957
Discontinued on 1 April 1960.

- Redesignated 476th Tactical Fighter Group on 31 July 1985 (Remained inactive)
- Redesignated 476th Fighter Group on 6 January 2009

Activated on 1 February 2009

=== Assignments ===
- Fourteenth Air Force, 19 May 1943 – 31 July 1943
- First Air Force, 1 December 1943
- 72d Fighter Wing, 26 March 1944 – 1 April 1944
- Air Defense Command, 8 February 1957
- Central Air Defense Force, 2 July 1959
- 29th Air Division, 1 April 1960
- 442d Fighter Wing, 1 February 2009 – present

=== Units assigned ===
==== Operational Units ====
- 13th Fighter-Interceptor Squadron: 2 July 1959 – 1 April 1960
- 76th Fighter Squadron: 1 February 2009 – present
- 453d Fighter Squadron: 1 December 1943 – 1 April 1944
- 541st Fighter Squadron: 1 December 1943 – 1 April 1944
- 542d Fighter Squadron: 1 December 1943 – 1 April 1944
- 543d Fighter Squadron: 1 December 1943 – 1 April 1944

==== Support Units ====
- 476th USAF Dispensary, 8 February 1957 – 1 April 1960
- 476th Air Base Squadron, 8 February 1957 – 1 April 1960
- 476th Maintenance Squadron, 1 February 2009 – present
- 476th Materiel Squadron, 8 February 1957 – 1 April 1960
- 476th Aerospace Medical Flight, 1 February 2009 – present

=== Stations ===
- Kunming Airport, China, 19 May 1943 – 31 July 1943
- Richmond Army Air Base, Virginia, 1 December 1943
- Pocatello Army Air Field, Idaho, 26 March 1944 – 1 April 1944
- Glasgow Air Force Base, Montana, 8 February 1957 – 1 April 1960
- Moody Air Force Base, Georgia, 1 February 2009 – present

=== Aircraft ===
- McDonnell F-101B Voodoo, 1959–1960
- Fairchild Republic A-10 Thunderbolt II, 2009–present

== See also ==
- List of United States Air Force Groups
- List of United States Air Force Aerospace Defense Command Interceptor Squadrons
