= China Air Task Force =

Combat organization of the US Army Air Forces

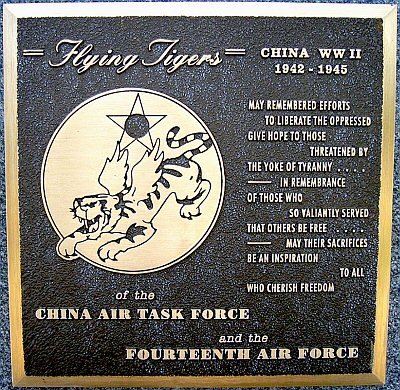
- Plaque located at U.S. Air Force Academy Cemetery
- Active: 4 July 1942 – 10 March 1943; Preceded by 1st American Volunteer Group; Succeeded by 14th Air Force
- Country: United States
- Allegiance: United States
- Branch: Air Force
- Type: Fighter pilot group
- Nickname: The Flying Tigers

Commanders
- Notable commanders: Claire Chennault

The China Air Task Force (CATF) was a combat organization of the United States Army Air Forces created on 4 July 1942 under the command of Brig. Gen. Claire Chennault, after the Flying Tigers of the 1st American Volunteer Group of the Republic of China Air Force were disbanded on 4 July of that year. It consisted of the 23rd Fighter Group with four squadrons, the assigned 74th, 75th, 76th, and attached 16th Fighter Squadrons, plus the 11th Bombardment Squadron. It was a subordinate unit of the Tenth Air Force in India, commanded by Brig. Gen. Earl Naiden and (from 18 August 1942) by Maj. Gen. Clayton Bissell. "Chennault had no respect for Bissell as a combat airman," wrote his biographer Martha Byrd, and "Bissell had no respect for Chennault as an administrator." Their relationship, she wrote, was ugly.

On 10 March 1943, the CATF was disbanded and replaced by the Fourteenth Air Force, with Chennault, now a major general, in command. In the nine months of its existence, the China Air Task Force had been credited with shooting down 149 Japanese planes, plus 85 probables, with a loss of only 16 P-40s. It had flown 65 bombing missions against Japanese targets in China, Burma and Indochina, dropping 311 tons of bombs and losing only one B-25 bomber.

== See also ==
- Development of Chinese Nationalist air force (1937–1945)
- Eagle Squadrons, American volunteers in the RAF during World War II
