= Edward F. Rector =

American World War II flying ace

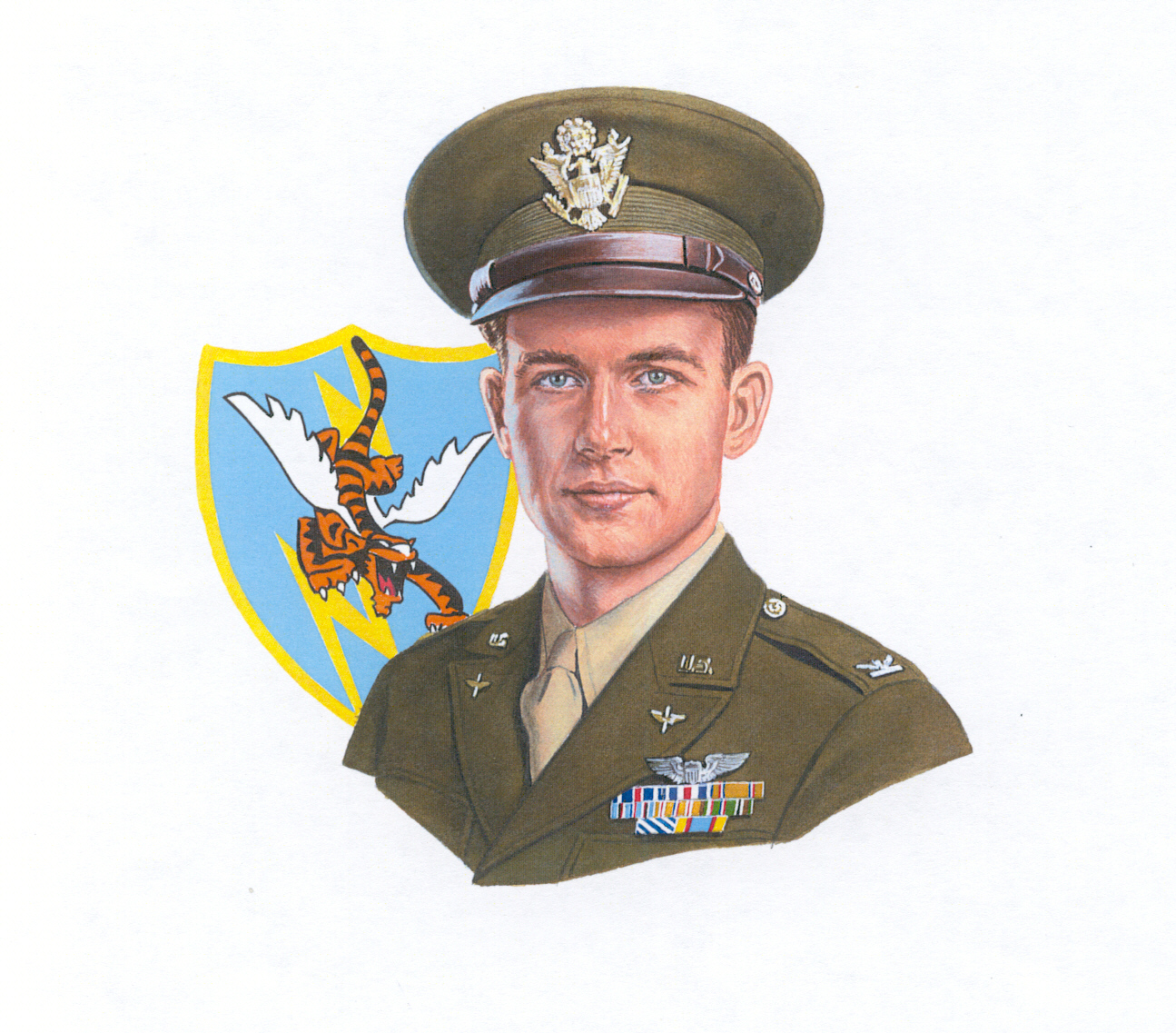
- Edward F. Rector; Gathering of Eagles 2000 Lithograph
- Born: September 28, 1916; Marshall, North Carolina, U.S.
- Died: April 26, 2001 (aged 84); Walter Reed Army Medical Center, Washington, D.C., U.S.
- Burial place: Arlington National Cemetery
- Military career
- Allegiance: United States
- Branch: United States Navy; United States Army Air Forces; United States Air Force
- Service years: 1939–1962
- Rank: Colonel
- Nickname: "Ed"
- Commands: 23rd Fighter Group; 76th Fighter Squadron
- Conflicts: World War II
- Awards: Silver Star; Legion of Merit; Distinguished Flying Cross (2); Air Medal; Order of the Cloud and Banner (China); Distinguished Flying Cross (United Kingdom)
- Other work: Consultant

Edward Franklin Rector (September 28, 1916 – April 26, 2001) was a colonel in the United States Air Force, a fighter ace of World War II, and a member of the Flying Tigers.

== Early years ==
Rector, a native of Marshall, North Carolina, graduated from Catawba College in 1938 and began his military career as a naval aviator. He was a carrier pilot on the USS Ranger, based in Norfolk, when he was recruited for the American Volunteer Group, the official name of the Flying Tigers. The unit was formed with the financial backing of the Chinese government to help defend the Burma Road and Chinese cities from Japanese attack before the United States entered World War II.

== At war ==
On December 10, 1941, Rector was part of a three-plane photo reconnaissance mission from Rangoon to Bangkok. On December 20 when the Flying Tigers engaged in combat for the first time during a raid by Hanoi-based Japanese aircraft on the Chinese city of Kunming, Rector provided the American Volunteer Group with its first aerial victory and would later record the last in a long list of 23rd Fighter Group air-to-air kills. In May 1942, he played a critical role in locating and attacking Japanese military columns attempting a push into China at the Salween River Gorge. This allowed the Chinese time to blow up a key bridge across the river, and the Japanese subsequently retreated into Burma. Rector was credited with having destroyed 10.5 Japanese aircraft in aerial combat during the war.

== Later years ==
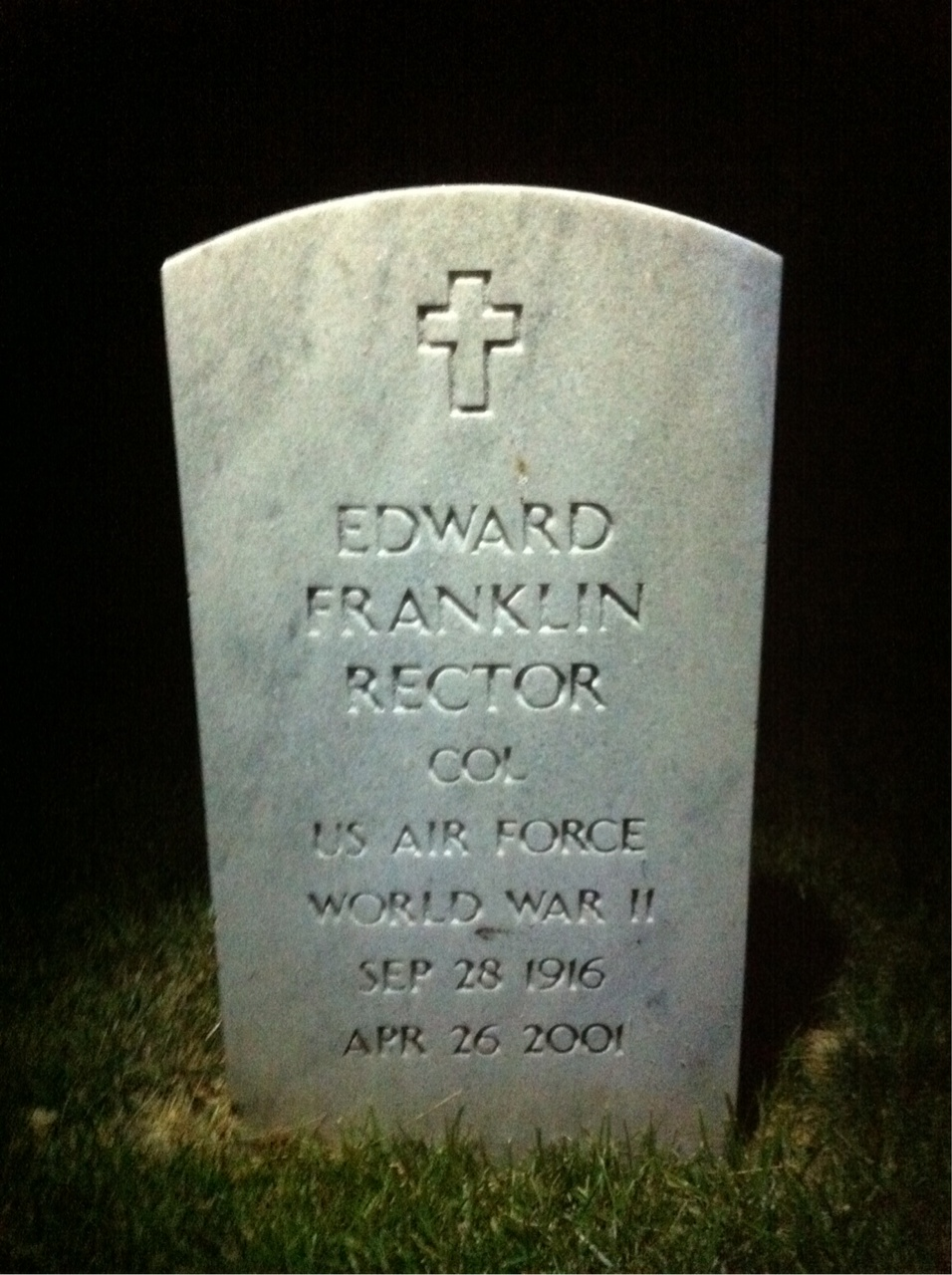
Grave at Arlington National Cemetery

Rector retired from the United States Air Force in 1962 as a colonel and had a second career in the aviation industry as a consultant in India, North Africa, and Europe. He died April 26, 2001, at Walter Reed Army Medical Center after suffering a heart attack and was buried at Arlington National Cemetery.

== Awards and decorations ==

U.S. Air Force Command Pilot Badge
Silver Star	Legion of Merit	Distinguished Flying Cross with bronze oak leaf cluster
Purple Heart	Air Medal with bronze oak leaf cluster	Air Force Commendation Medal
Air Force Presidential Unit Citation	American Defense Service Medal	American Campaign Medal
Asiatic-Pacific Campaign Medal with two bronze campaign stars	World War II Victory Medal	National Defense Service Medal with service star
Air Force Longevity Service Award with four bronze oak leaf clusters	Distinguished Flying Cross (United Kingdom)	Order of Yung Hui (5th class) (Republic of China)
Order of the Cloud and Banner (1st class) (Republic of China)	Army, Navy & Air Force Medal (Republic of China)	China War Memorial Medal (Republic of China)
