= 68th Composite Wing =

- Active: 1943–1945
- Country: United States
- Branch: United States Air Force
- Role: Fighter
- Engagements: China Burma India Theater of World War II

Commanders
- Notable commanders: Clinton D. Vincent

The 68th Composite Wing was a United States Army Air Forces organization. It was a command and control organization of Fourteenth Air Force that fought in the China Burma India Theater of World War II.

The wing was formed as an expansion of the Fourteenth Air Force Forward Echelon in 1943, becoming the command and control organization for the 23d Fighter Group and 308th Bombardment Group. It served in combat from December 1943 until August 1945. The mixed unit was composed of fighters, fighter bombers and heavy bombers, flown by both American and Chinese airmen.

== Lineage ==
- Constituted as the 68th Fighter Wing on 9 August 1943

Activated on 3 September 1943
Redesignated 68th Composite Wing in December 1943
Inactivated on 10 October 1945
Disbanded 15 June 1983
Reconstituted 31 July 1985 and redesignated 518th Air Refueling Wing

=== Assignments ===
- Fourteenth Air Force, 3 September 1943 – 10 October 1945

=== Stations ===
- Kunming Airport, China, 3 September 1943
- Kweilin Airfield, China, c. 23 December 1943
- Liuchow Airfield, China c. 15 September 1944
- Luliang Airfield, China, c. 7 November 1944
- Peishiyi Airfield, China, c. 19 September-10 October 1945

=== Components ===
- 23d Fighter Group August 1943 – October 1945 (P-40, P-51)
- 308th Bombardment Group March 1943 – February 1945 (B-24)
