= Luliang Air Base =

Military air base in Yunnan, China

Luliang Air Base
- IATA: none; ICAO: ZL11

Summary
- Airport type: Military
- Location: Luliang County, Yunnan, China
- Coordinates: 24°59′17″N 103°38′33″E

Map
- Location of airport in Yunnan

Runways
Direction	Length		Surface
Direction	m	ft	Surface
02/20	2,651	8,698	Concrete

Luliang Air Base is a People's Liberation Army Air Force Base, located about 5 kilometers southwest of Luliang in Yunnan Province, China.

== History ==
During World War II, the base was used by the United States Army Air Forces Fourteenth Air Force as part of the China Defensive Campaign (1942–1945). The airfield was the primary home of the 23d Fighter Group (Flying Tigers), and its command and control organization, the 68th Composite Wing beginning in September 1944 until the end of the war in 1945. Secondary USAAF units assigned to the base were P-38 Lightning reconnaissance aircraft that flew photo-recon missions over Japanese-held territory; and C-47 Skytrain transports which moved personnel and materiel in and out of the base, along with evacuating casualties to rear areas. The Americans closed their facilities at Luliang after the war ended in October 1945.

== See also ==
- List of People's Liberation Army Air Force airbases
