= Fourteenth Air Force =

Numbered air force of the United States Air Force responsible for space forces

Fourteenth Air Force (Air Forces Strategic)
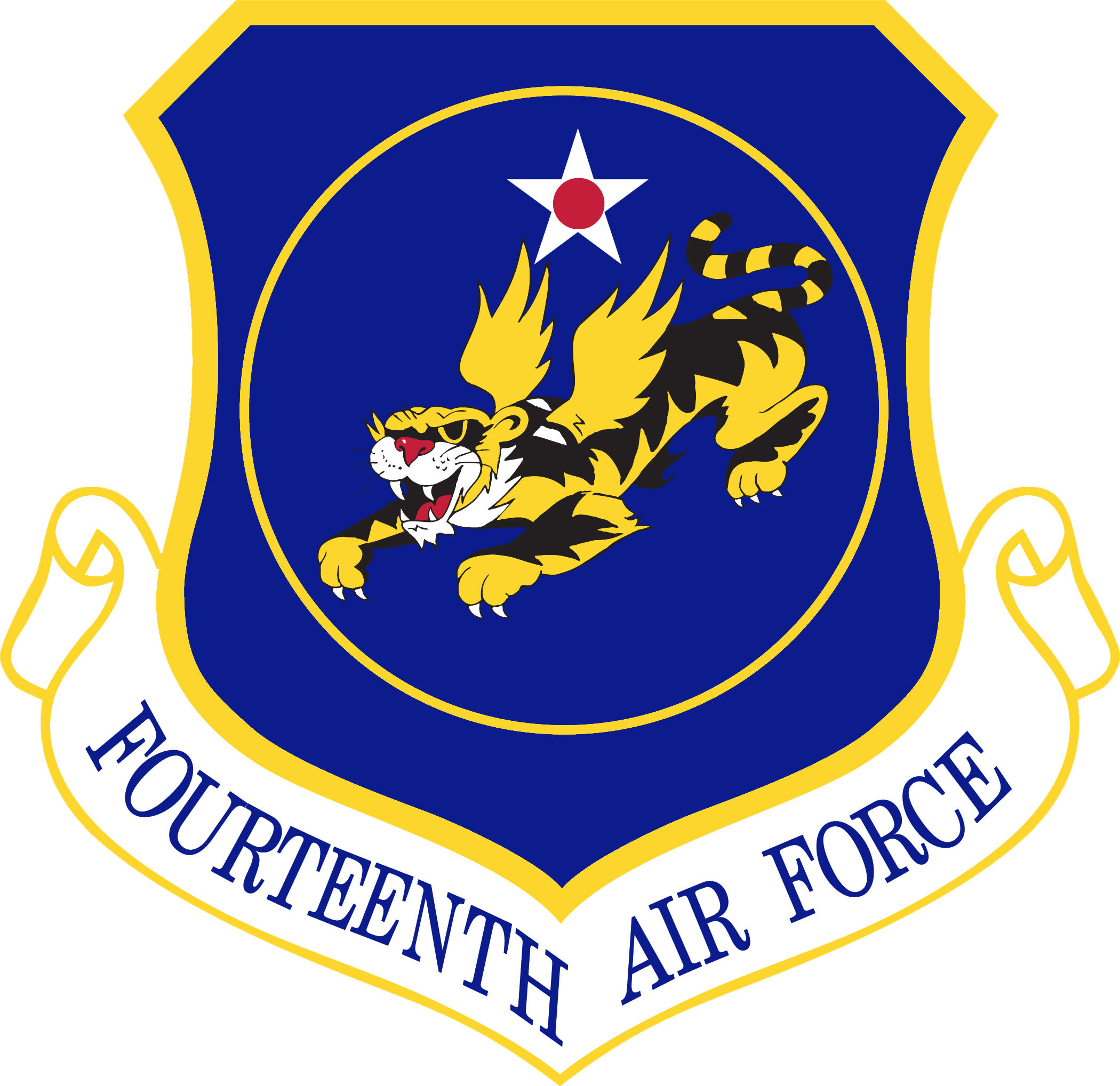
- Shield of the Fourteenth Air Force
- Active: 4 April 2008 – 20 December 2019 (as Fourteenth Air Force (Air Forces Strategic)); 24 May 2007 – 4 April 2008 (as Fourteenth Air Force (Air Forces Strategic – Space)); 1 July 1993 – 24 May 2007; 1 December 1985 – 1 July 1993 (as Fourteenth Air Force); 8 October 1976 – 1 December 1985 (as Fourteenth Air Force (Reserve)); 1 July 1968 – 1 October 1976 (as Fourteenth Aerospace Force); 20 January 1966 – 1 July 1968; 24 May 1946 – 1 September 1960; 5 March 1943 – 6 January 1946 (as Fourteenth Air Force) (83 years, 4 months)
- Country: United States of America
- Branch: United States Air Force (18 September 1947 – 20 December 2019); United States Army ( Army Air Forces, 5 March 1943 – 18 September 1947)
- Type: Numbered Air Force
- Role: Provides space forces and serves as the space component for U.S. Strategic Command
- Part of: Air Force Space Command; U.S. Strategic Command
- Headquarters: Vandenberg Air Force Base, California, U.S.
- Engagements: World War II - Asiatic-Pacific Theater: China Defensive; China Offensive

- Decorations: Air Force Outstanding Unit Award Air Force Organizational Excellence Award

Commanders
- Notable commanders: LTG Claire Chennault

The Fourteenth Air Force (14 AF; Air Forces Strategic) was a numbered air force of the United States Air Force Space Command (AFSPC). It was headquartered at Vandenberg Air Force Base, California.

The command was responsible for the organization, training, equipping, command and control, and employment of Air Force space forces to support operational plans and missions for U.S. combatant commanders and their subordinate components and was the Air Force Component to U.S. Strategic Command for space operations.

Established on 5 March 1943 at Kunming, China, 14 AF was a United States Army Air Forces combat air force activated in the Asiatic-Pacific Theater of World War II. It primarily fought in China. After World War II Fourteenth Air Force subsequently served Air Defense Command, Continental Air Command, and the Air Force Reserve (AFR).

14 AF was commanded by Major General Stephen N. Whiting. Its Command Chief Master Sergeant was Chief Master Sergeant Patrick F. McMahon. ^{&}

On 20 December 2019, the USAF's Fourteenth Air Force was redesignated as the United States Space Force's Space Operations Command (SPOC). On 21 October 2020, Space Operations Command headquarters was redesignated as the Fourteenth Air Force and inactivated.

== History ==
=== World War II ===
==== 1st American Volunteer Group ====
With the United States entry into World War II against the Empire of Japan in December 1941, Claire Chennault, the commander of the American Volunteer Group (AVG) (known as the Flying Tigers) of the Chinese Air Force was called to Chongqing, China, on 29 March 1942, for a conference to decide the fate of the AVG. Present at the conference were Chiang Kai-shek; his wife, Soong Mei-ling; Lt. Gen. Joseph W. Stilwell, commander of all U.S. forces in the China Burma India Theater; and Colonel Clayton L. Bissell, who had arrived in early March. Bissell was General Henry H. 'Hap' Arnold's choice to command the USAAF's proposed combat organization in China.

As early as 30 December 1941, the U.S. War Department in Washington, D.C., had authorized the induction of the Flying Tigers into the U.S. Army Air Forces (USAAF). Chennault was opposed to inducting the Flying Tigers into the Army. Stilwell and Bissell made it clear to both Chennault and Chiang that unless the AVG became part of the U.S. Army Air Force, its supplies would be cut off. Chennault agreed to return to active duty but he made it clear to Stilwell that his men would have to speak for themselves.

Chiang Kai-shek finally agreed to induction of the AVG into the USAAF, after Stilwell promised that the fighter group absorbing the induction would remain in China with Chennault in command. With the situation in Burma rapidly deteriorating, Stilwell and Bissell wanted the AVG dissolved by 30 April 1942. Chennault, wanting to keep the Flying Tigers going as long as possible, proposed the group disband on 4 July, when the AVG's contracts with the Nationalist Chinese government expired. Stilwell and Bissell accepted.

==== China Air Task Force ====
Chennault was recalled to active duty in the USAAF on 15 April 1942 in the grade of Brigadier General. Chennault was told that he would have to be satisfied with command of a China Air Task Force of fighters and bombers as part of the Tenth Air Force. Its mission was to defend the aerial supply operation over the Himalayan mountains between India and China – nicknamed the Hump – and to provide air support for Chinese ground forces. Bissell had been promoted to brigadier general with one day's seniority to Chennault in order to command all American air units in China as Stillwell's Air Commander (in August 1942 he became commanding general of the Tenth Air Force). Friction developed when Chennault and the Chinese government were disturbed by the possibility that Chennault would no longer control combat operations in China. However, when Tenth Air Force commanding general Lewis Brereton was transferred to Egypt on 26 June, Stillwell used the occasion to issue an announcement that Chennault would continue to command all air operations in China.

The CATF had 51 fighters in July 1942: 31 Curtiss 81A-1 (export Tomahawks) and P-40B Tomahawks, and 20 P-40E Warhawks. Only 29 were flyable. The 81A-1s and P-40Bs were from the original 100 fighters China had purchased for use by the Flying Tigers; the P-40E Warhawks had been flown from India to China in May 1942 as part of the 23rd Fighter Group, attached to the AVG to gain experience and provide continuity to the takeover of operations of the AVG. Both fighters were good medium-altitude day fighters, with their best performance between 15,000 and 18,000 feet, and they were excellent ground-strafing aircraft.

The 11th Bombardment Squadron (Medium), consisting of the seven B-25s flown in from India, made up the bomber section of Chennault's command. These seven B-25C Mitchells were the remnants of an original 12 sent from India. Four were lost on a bombing mission en route and a fifth developed mechanical problems such that it was grounded and used for spare parts.

The AVG was disbanded on 4 July 1942, simultaneous with the activation of the 23rd FG. Its personnel were offered USAAF commissions but only five of the AVG pilots accepted them. The remainder of the AVG pilots, many disgruntled with Bissell, became civilian transport pilots in China, went back to America into other jobs, or joined or rejoined the other military services and fought elsewhere in the war. An example was Fritz Wolf who returned to the Navy with the rank of Lieutenant, senior grade and assigned as fighter pilot instructor at the Jacksonville Naval Air Station in Florida.

The 23rd Fighter Group with the 74th, 75th and 76th Fighter squadrons, its table of organization rounded out by the transfer of men and P-40s from two squadrons of the 51st Fighter Group in India. A fourth fighter squadron for the 23rd Group was obtained by subterfuge. In June and July 1942, Chennault got the Tenth Air Force to relocate the 51st FG's 16th Fighter Squadron, commanded by Major John Alison, to his main base in Kunming, China, to gain combat experience. Chennault took them into the CATF – and never returned them.

On 19 March 1943, the CATF was disbanded and its units made part of the newly activated Fourteenth Air Force, with Chennault, now a major general, still in command. In the nine months of its existence, the China Air Task Force shot down 149 Japanese planes, plus 85 probables, with a loss of only 16 P-40s. It had flown 65 bombing missions against Japanese targets in China, Burma and Indochina, dropping 311 tons of bombs and losing only one B-25 bomber.

The members of Fourteenth Air Force and the US press adopted the name Flying Tigers for themselves after the AVG's dissolution. Especially the 23d Fighter Group was often called by the same nickname.

==== Fourteenth Air Force ====
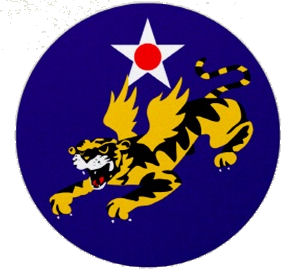

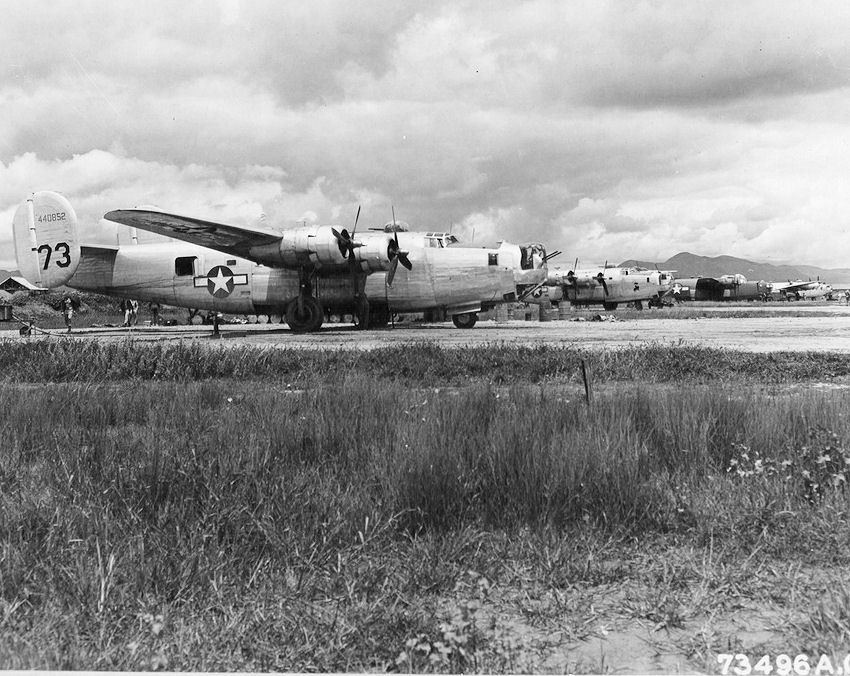
Newly arrived Fourteenth Air Force B-24 Liberators on the line at Kunming Wujiaba Airport, China on 6 September 1944.

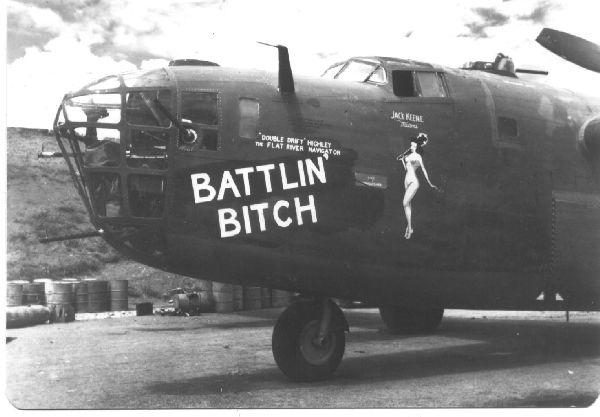
14th Air Force B-24, China, c. 1944.

The Fourteenth Air Force official web site says:

After the China Air Task Force was discontinued, the Fourteenth Air Force (14 AF) was established by the special order of President Roosevelt on 10 March 1943. Chennault was appointed the commander and promoted to Major General. The "Flying Tigers" of 14 AF (who adopted the "Flying Tigers" designation from the AVG) conducted highly effective fighter and bomber operations along a wide front that stretched from the bend of the Yellow River and Jinan in the north to Indochina in the south, from Chengdu and the Salween River in the west to both East and South China Seas and the island of Formosa in the east. They were also instrumental in supplying Chinese forces through the airlift of cargo across "The Hump" in the China-Burma-India theater. By the end of World War II, 14 AF had achieved air superiority over the skies of China and established a ratio of 7.7 enemy planes destroyed for every American plane lost in combat. Over all, military officials estimated that over 4,000 Japanese planes were destroyed or damaged in the China-Burma-India theater during World War II. In addition, they estimated that air units in China destroyed 1,100,000 tons of shipping, 1,079 locomotives, 4,836 trucks and 580 bridges. The United States Army Air Forces credits 14 AF with the destruction of 2,315 Japanese aircraft, 356 bridges, 1,225 locomotives and 712 railroad cars.

==== Chinese-American Composite Wing ====
In addition to the core Fourteenth Air Force (14AF) structure, a second group, the Chinese-American Composite Wing (CACW), existed as a combined 1st Bomber, 3rd Fighter, and 5th Fighter Group with pilots from both the United States and the Republic of China. U.S. service personnel destined for the CACW entered the China theater in mid-July 1943. Aircraft assigned to the CACW included later series P-40 Warhawks (with the Nationalist Chinese Air Force blue sky and 12-pointed white sun national insignia, rudder markings, and squadron/aircraft numbering) and B-25 Mitchell medium bombers. In late 1944, USAAF-marked P-51 Mustangs began to be assigned to CACW pilots—first P-51B and C series followed by, in early 1945, D and K series. The latter were a reduced-weight versions sharing many of the external characteristics of the D series aircraft including the bubble canopy. All U.S. pilots assigned to the CACW were listed as rated pilots in Chinese Air Force and were authorized to wear the pilot's wings of both nations. One of the known Chinese pilots is Captain Ho Weng Toh of Singapore, the last known surviving Flying Tigers' member in Asia. Captain Ho flew the B-25 bomber, as part of the 1st Bomber Group.

Members of the 3rd FG were honored with a Distinguished Unit Citation (now Presidential Unit Citation) for a sustained campaign: Mission "A" in the late summer of 1944. Mission "A" halted a major Japanese ground offensive and resulted in the award of individual decorations for several of the group's pilots for the planning and execution of the mission.

Most CACW bases existed near the boundary of Japanese-Occupied China and one "Valley Field" existed in an area within Japanese-held territory. Specific field locations included Hanzhong, Ankang, Xi'an, Laohekou, Enshi, Liangshan, Baishiyi, Zhijiang, Hengyang, Guilin, Liuzhou, Zhanyi, Suichwan, and Lingling. Today, the 1st, 3rd and 5th Groups of CACW are still operating in Taiwan, reorganized as 443rd, 427th and 401st Tactical Fighter Wings of the Republic of China Air Force.

==== World War II Units ====
- 68th Composite Wing
  Constituted as 68th Fighter Wing, 9 August 1943.
  Redesignated 68th Composite Wing, December 1943.
  Inactivated 10 October 1945.

23rd Fighter Group (Flying Tigers) (P-40, P-51). (Note: Transferred from the Tenth Air Force)
July 1942 – December 1945
308th Bombardment Group:(B-24)
March 1943 – February 1945

- 69th Composite Wing
  Constituted as 69th Bombardment Wing, 9 August 1943.
  Redesignated 69th Composite Wing, December 1943.
  Reassigned to Tenth Air Force, August 1945.

51st Fighter Group (P-40, P-38, P-51)
October 1943 – August 1945
341st Bombardment Group (Medium) (B-25)
January 1944 – August 1945,

- 312th Fighter Wing
  Constituted as 312th Fighter Wing, 7 March 1944.
  Reassigned to United States, December 1945.

81st Fighter Group: 1944–1945 (P-40, P-47)
May 1944 – December 1945
33rd Fighter Group: 1944 Xfer from 10th AF (P-38, P-47)
April 1944 – September 1944
311th Fighter Group: 1944–1945 Xfer from 10th AF (A-36, P-51)
August 1944 – December 1945

- Chinese-American Composite Wing (1943-1945)

3rd Fighter Group (P-40, P-51)

7th Fighter Squadron
8th Fighter Squadron
28th Fighter Squadron
32d Fighter Squadron

5th Fighter Group (P-40, P-51)

17th Fighter Squadron
26th Fighter Squadron
27th Fighter Squadron
29th Fighter Squadron

1st Bombardment Group (Medium) (B-25)

1st Bombardment Squadron
2d Bombardment Squadron
3d Bombardment Squadron

- Other assigned units:

402d Fighter Group:
May–July 1943. Assigned but never equipped.
476th Fighter Group:
May–July 1943. Assigned but never equipped.
341st Bombardment Group: Xfer from Tenth AF (B-25)
January 1944 – November 1945
443d Troop Carrier Group: Xfer from Tenth AF (C-47/C-54)
August–November 1945
426th Night Fighter Squadron: Xfer from 10th AF (P-61)
427th Night Fighter Squadron: Xfer from 10th AF (P-61)

==== John Birch ====
American missionary John Birch was recommended to Chennault for intelligence work by Jimmy Doolittle, whom he had assisted when Doolittle's crew landed in China after the raid on Tokyo. Inducted into the Fourteenth on its formation, and later seconded to the OSS, he built a formidable network of Chinese informants to provide the Flying Tigers with intelligence on Japanese land and sea military positions and the disposition of shipping and railways. He was killed by Chinese communists when he attempted to see a downed plane they had been assigned to guard ten days after the war ended, which led to him being chosen as the namesake of the John Birch Society. The incident is recounted in the memoir of Paul Frillmann, China: The Remembered Life, who had started the war as the chaplain for the Flying Tigers.

=== Air Defense Command ===
In March 1946, USAAF Chief General Carl Spaatz had undertaken a major re-organization of the postwar USAAF that had included the establishment of Major Commands (MAJCOM), who would report directly to HQ United States Army Air Forces. Continental Air Forces was inactivated, and Tenth Air Force was assigned to the postwar Air Defense Command in March 1946 and subsequently to Continental Air Command (ConAC) in December 1948 being primarily concerned with air defense.

The command was re-activated on 24 May 1946 at Orlando Army Air Base (later, AFB), Florida. It was originally assigned to provide air defense over a wide region of the Southeast United States along the border of North Carolina, Tennessee, Arkansas and Oklahoma, including Texas south to the Rio Grande. In addition to the command and control of the active Air Force interceptor and radar units in its region, it also became the command organization for the Air Force Reserve and state Air National Guard units.

By 1949 with the establishment of the Western Air Defense Force (WADF) and Eastern Air Defense Force (EADF), the air defense mission of the command was transferred to primary to the EADF, leaving Fourteenth AF free to focus on its reserve training tasks. It was then reassigned to Continental Air Command and moved to Robins AFB, Georgia, in October 1949.

During the Korean War, 14 AF participated in the mobilization of Air National Guard and Air Force Reserve units and individuals from its headquarters at Robins Air Force Base (AFB), Georgia. After the Korean War, the reserve wings of 14 AF participated in various airlift operations, such as Operation SIXTEEN TONS, Operation SWIFT LIFT and Operation READY SWAP. 14 AF was inactivated on 1 September 1960.

Fourteenth Air Force was activated on 20 January 1966, at Gunter AFB, Alabama as part of Air Defense Command with the inactivation of its organization of Air Defense Sectors. Its area of responsibility was essentially the same as its 1948 region, with its region shifted slightly west to include New Mexico. Eastern North and South Carolina were under the activated First Air Force.

On 16 January 1968 Air Defense Command was re-designated Aerospace Defense Command (ADCOM) as part of a restructuring of USAF air defense forces. The command was re designated as Fourteenth Aerospace Force on 1 July 1968 and moved to Ent AFB, Colorado, absorbing the resources of the 9th Aerospace Defense Division. As part of ADCOM's new emphasis on defenses against Intercontinental Ballistic Missiles (ICBMs) and Submarine-launched ballistic missile (SLBMs), the mission of the 14th Aerospace Force was to detect foreign missile launches, track missiles and satellites in space, launch space vehicles, maintain a satellite data base of all man-made objects in space, and performing anti-satellite actions. Its former region of the southeast was reassigned to the 31st and 32d Air Divisions.

As the 14th Aerospace Force, the command supervised the Ballistic Missile Early Warning System (BMEWS) network of Radars along the Arctic Circle. Additional radars came under the command's control for the sole purpose of detecting, identifying, tracking and sending back to NORAD data on any SLBM. All man-made objects became numbers in the USAF SPACETRACK network operated by the 14th Aerospace Force.

=== Air Force Reserve ===
Budget reductions and reorganizations within ADCOM brought many changes and reductions in aerospace resources along with almost continual turmoil in the command structure of 14 AF during the 1970s. In 1976 the headquarters of the 14th Aerospace Force was inactivated, being moved to Dobbins AFB, Georgia and activated as the Fourteenth Air Force (Reserve).

The mission of the command at Dobbins was changed to the supervision, management and support of Air Force Reserve airlift forces for Military Airlift Command and participated in such missions as Operation Just Cause. It was again re-designated Fourteenth Air Force on 1 December 1985, and inactivated on 1 July 1993.

=== Air Force Space Command ===
On 1 July 1993, 14 AF returned to its former space role and became a Numbered Air Force for Air Force Space Command, responsible for performing space operations. In 1997, 14 AF established the Space Operations Center at Vandenberg AFB in California for the 24-hour command and control of all space operations resources. In 2002, 14 AF became the Air Force space operational component of United States Strategic Command.

As the Air Force's sole Numbered Air Force for space and its concurrent United States Strategic Command mission of Joint Space Operations, the operational mission of 14 AF included space launch from the east and west coasts, satellite command and control, missile warning, space surveillance and command and control of assigned and attached joint space forces. The overall mission was to control and exploit space for global and theater operations, thereby ensuring U.S. warfighters were supported by the best space capabilities available.

In 2005, 14 AF officially opened up its newly renovated operations center. The new command and control capabilities of the Joint Space Operations Center ensured unity of effort for all space capabilities supporting joint military operations around the globe.

On 20 December 2019, Air Force Secretary Barbara Barrett redesignated the 14 AF as Space Operations Command (SPOC), part of the newly established U.S. Space Force. On 21 Oct 2020, Space Operations Command, HQ was redesignated back to Fourteenth Air Force and inactivated.

14th Air Force's component wings and groups in 2019 were:

- 614th Air and Space Operations Center, operates Joint Space Operations Center
- 21st Space Wing, Peterson Air Force Base, Colorado
- 30th Space Wing, Vandenberg Air Force Base, California
- 45th Space Wing, Patrick Air Force Base, Florida
- 50th Space Wing, Schriever Air Force Base, Colorado
- 460th Space Wing, Buckley Air Force Base, Colorado

== Lineage ==
- Established as China Air Task Force (CATF) **, 14 July 1942

Activated on 14 July 1942 absorbing equipment and personnel of the 1st American Volunteer Group
Inactivated on 19 March 1943

- Established as Fourteenth Air Force on 5 March 1943

Activated on 19 March 1943 absorbing equipment and personnel of the China Air Task Force (CATF)
Inactivated on 6 January 1946

- Activated on 24 May 1946

Inactivated on 1 September 1960.

- Activated on 20 January 1966
- Redesignated Fourteenth Aerospace Force on 1 July 1968.

Inactivated on 1 October 1976.

- Redesignated Fourteenth Air Force (Reserve), and activated on 8 October 1976
- Redesignated Fourteenth Air Force on 1 December 1985.

Inactivated on 1 July 1993.

- Activated 1 July 1993

* Authorized as a "Special Air Unit" by President Roosevelt in 1941 and equipped with United States equipment, however not officially affiliated with the United States military. The 1st American Volunteer Group was formally disbanded on 4 July 1942. Each member was offered a commission in the United States Army Air Forces. Some accepted the offer, once again put on their American uniforms, and remained in China. Others later returned to the ranks of the Army, Navy, or Marine Corps but fought in other areas of the world. Eighteen accepted offers to fly for the China National Aviation Corporation. The equipment and those members of the 1st AVG choosing to join the USAAF were absorbed into United States Army Air Forces China Air Task Force on 14 July 1942 as the 23rd Fighter Group.
** Assigned to Tenth Air Force.

== Assignments ==
- Assigned to U.S. Army Forces, China-Burma-India Theater, 10 March 1943
- Assigned to U.S. Forces, China Theater, about 24 October 1944
- Air Defense Command, 20 January 1946
- Continental Air Command, 1 December 1948
- Air (later, Aerospace) Defense Command, 1 July 1968

Absorbed Resources of 9th Aerospace Defense Division

- Air Force Reserve, 8 October 1976
- Air Force Space Command 1 July 1993 - 2019

== Components ==
=== Air Divisions ===
- 8th Air Division, 1 May 1949 – 1 August 1950
- 9th Air Division, 1 May 1949 – 1 August 1950
- 31st Air Division, 1 April 1966 – 1 July 1968
- 32d Air Division, 1 April 1966 – 1 July 1968

=== Wings ===
- 71st Missile Warning Wing

Reassigned from 9th Aerospace Defense Division, 1 July 1968
Stationed at Ent AFB, Colorado
Moved to McGuire AFB, New Jersey, 21 July 1969
Inactivated, 30 April 1971

- 73d Aerospace Surveillance Wing

Reassigned from 9th Aerospace Defense Division, 1 July 1968
Stationed at Ent AFB, Colorado
Moved to Tyndall AFB, Florida and inactivated 30 April 1971

- 4756th Air Defense Wing (Training)

Reassigned from 73d Air Division, 1 April 1966
Stationed at Tyndall AFB, Florida
Discontinued, 1 January 1968

- 4780th Air Defense Wing (Training)

Reassigned from 73d Air Division, 1 April 1966
Stationed at Perrin AFB, Texas
Reassigned to Tenth Air Force, 1 July 1968

=== Groups ===
- 10th Aerospace Defense Group

Reassigned from 9th Aerospace Defense Division, 1 July 1968
Stationed at Vandenberg AFB, California
Inactivated on 1 November 1979

- 12th Missile Warning Group

Reassigned from 71st Missile Warning Wing, 30 April 1971
Stationed at Thule Air Base, Greenland
Reassigned to 21st Air Division, 1 October 1976

=== Squadrons ===
- 4751st Air Defense Squadron (Missile)

Reassigned from 4756th Air Defense Wing, 15 June 1966
Stationed at Tyndall AFB, Florida
Reassigned to Air Defense Weapons Center (ADC), 1 January 1968

- 14th Missile Warning Squadron

Activated at Laredo AFB, Texas, 8 July 1972
Moved to MacDill AFB, Florida, 30 June 1975
Reassigned to ADCOM, 1 October 1976

- 16th Surveillance Squadron

Reassigned from 73d Aerospace Surveillance Wing, 30 April 1971
Stationed at Shemya AFS, Alaska
Reassigned Alaskan ADCOM Region, 1 October 1976

- 18th Surveillance Squadron

Reassigned from 73d Aerospace Surveillance Wing, 30 April 1971
Stationed at Edwards AFB, California
Inactivated 1 October 1975

- 19th Surveillance Squadron

Reassigned from 73d Aerospace Surveillance Wing, 30 April 1971
Stationed at Diyarbakir, Turkey
Reassigned to 21st Air Division, 1 October 1976

- 20th Surveillance Squadron

Reassigned from 73d Aerospace Surveillance Wing, 30 April 1971
Stationed at Eglin AFB, Florida
Inactivated 1 October 1975
Reassigned to 20th Air Division, 1 October 1976

- 17th Radar Squadron

Activated 1 September 1972 at Ko Kha ASN, Thailand
Inactivated 31 May 1976

== Stations ==
- Kunming, China, 10 March 1943
- Peishiyi, China, 7 August – 15 December 1945
- Fort Lawton, Washington, 5–6 January 1946
- Orlando AB, Florida, 24 May 1946
- Robins AFB, Georgia, October 1949
- Gunter AFB, Alabama, 1 April 1966
- Colorado Springs, Colorado, 1 July 1968
- Dobbins AFB (later, ARB), Georgia, 8 October 1976
- Vandenberg AFB, California, 1 July 1993

== List of commanders ==
No.	Commander		Term		
No.	Portrait	Name	Took office	Left office	Duration
n	William L. Shelton	Lieutenant General; William L. Shelton	4 April 2008	9 December 2008	249 days
n	Larry D. James	Lieutenant General; Larry D. James	9 December 2008	21 January 2011	2 years, 43 days
n	Susan Helms	Lieutenant General; Susan Helms	21 January 2011	31 January 2014	3 years, 10 days
n	John W. Raymond	Lieutenant General; John W. Raymond	31 January 2014	14 August 2015	1 year, 195 days
n	David J. Buck	Lieutenant General; David J. Buck	14 August 2015	1 December 2017	2 years, 109 days
n	Stephen N. Whiting	Major General; Stephen N. Whiting	1 December 2017	20 November 2019	1 year, 354 days
n	John E. Shaw	Major General; John E. Shaw	20 November 2019	20 December 2019	30 days

== See also ==
- Combined Force Space Component Command
- South-East Asian Theatre of World War II
- Burma Campaign
- Operation Ichi-Go
- RAF Third Tactical Air Force
