= 76th Fighter Squadron =

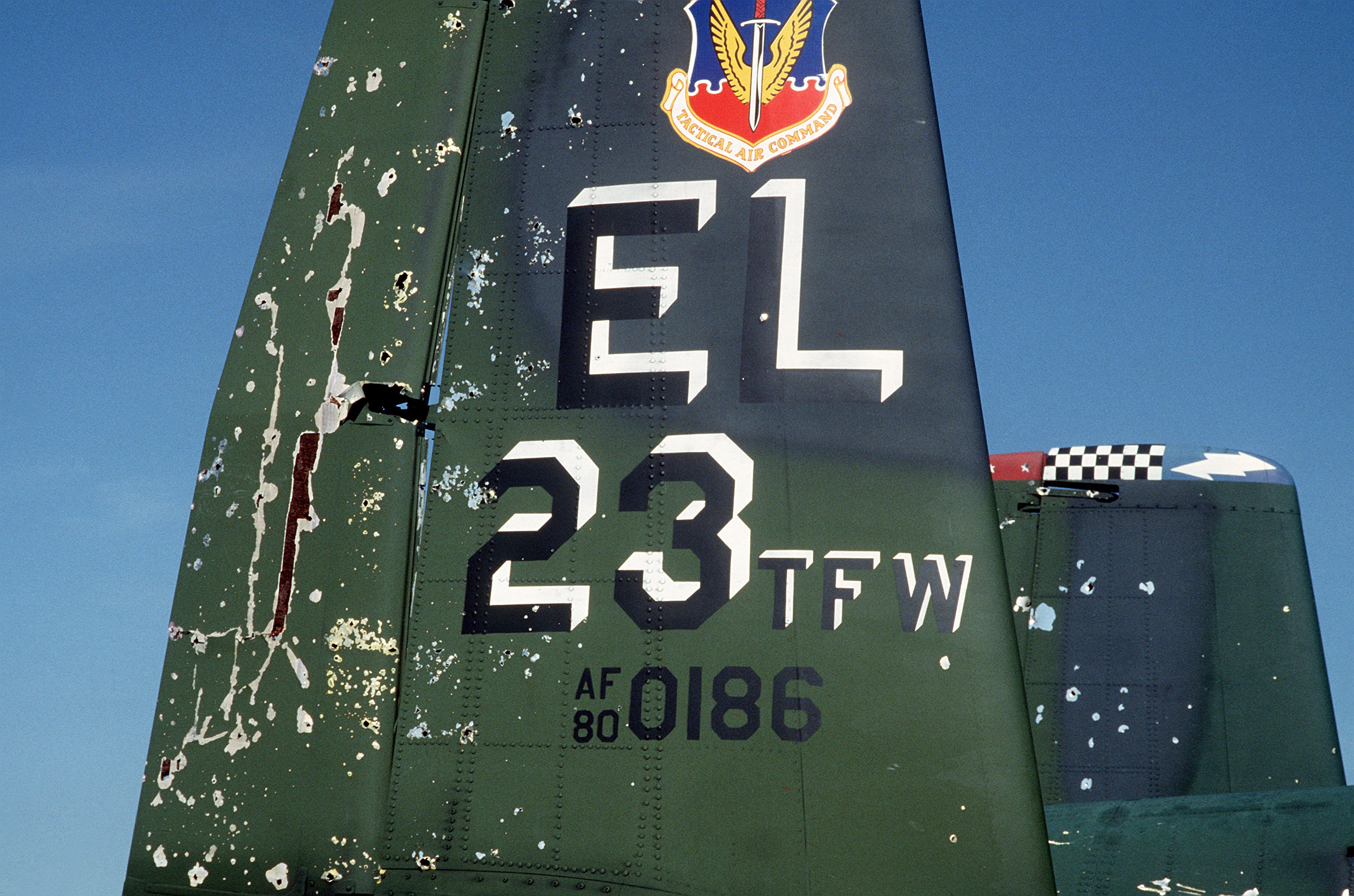
- The 76th is represented by the red marking on the rudder of this 23d Tac Fighter Wing A-10 damaged in battle by a SA-16 missile during Desert Storm.
- Active: 17 December 1941–present
- Country: United States
- Branch: United States Air Force
- Type: Fighter
- Part of: Air Force Reserve Command
- Garrison/HQ: Moody Air Force Base, Georgia
- Engagements: World War II; Gulf War; Operation Joint Endeavor; Operation Deny Flight; Operation Desert Fox; Operation Allied Force

Insignia
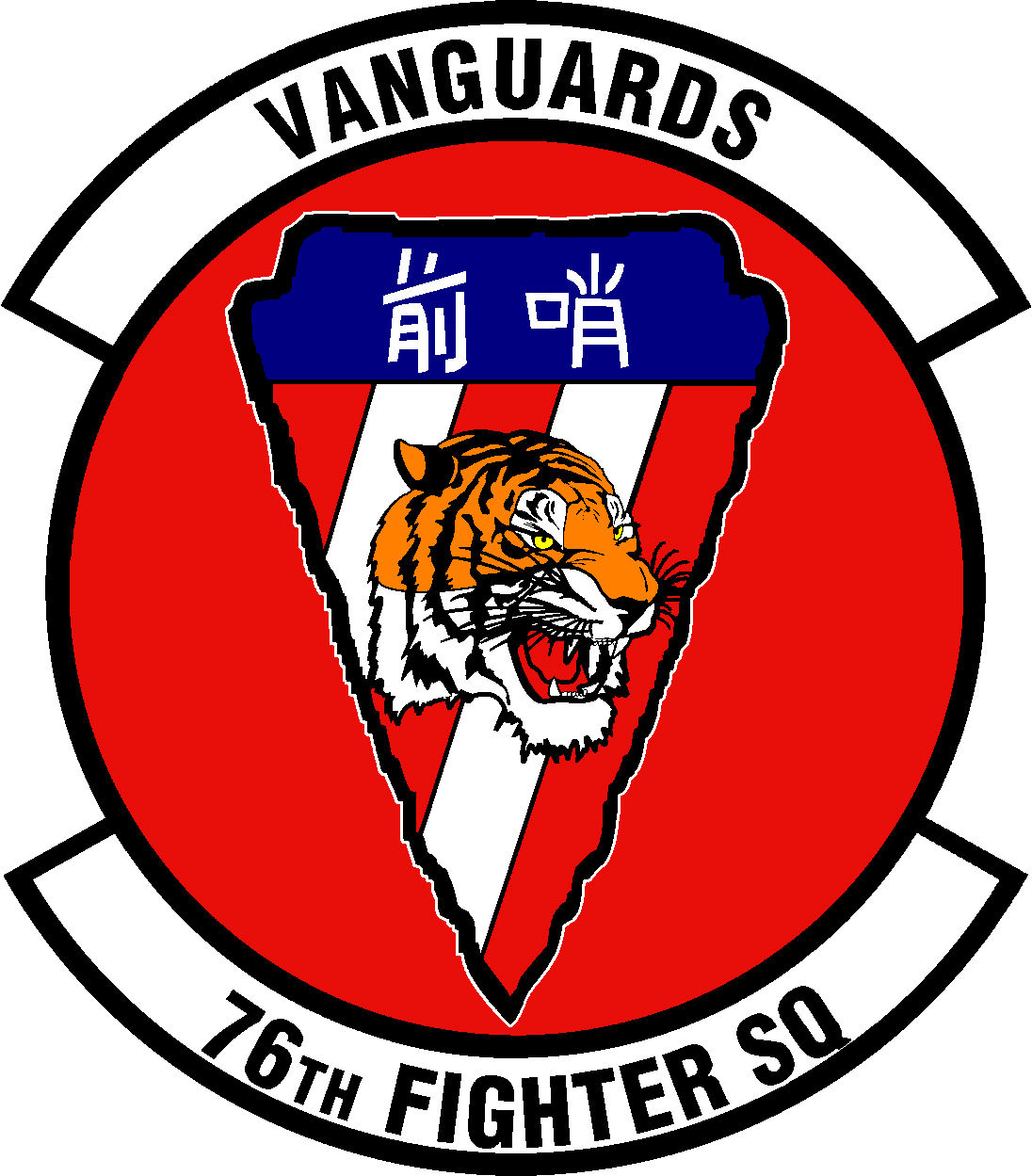
- 76th Fighter Squadron emblem (approved 1 August 2000)

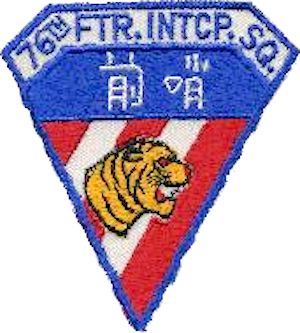
- Patch with 76th Fighter Squadron emblem (approved 24 July 1944)

The 76th Fighter Squadron is a United States Air Force Reserve unit. It is assigned to the 476th Fighter Group and stationed at Moody Air Force Base, Georgia. The squadron is equipped with the Fairchild Republic A-10C Thunderbolt II attack fighter.

During World War II, the 76th Fighter Squadron was one of the three original squadrons (74th, 75th, 76th) of the 23d Fighter Group.

== History ==
=== World War II ===
The history of the 76th dates to the earliest days of World War II. During the summer of 1941, Claire Lee Chennault formed a small group of American pilots into three fighter squadrons, the American Volunteer Group, of the Chinese Air Force. The unit immediately garnered international attention for their combat successes while defending China and Burma, and they became known as the "Flying Tigers." Some members of the AVG joined or rejoined the United States Air Force after the AVG was disbanded.

The 76th squadron remained in combat in the China-Burma-India (CBI) Theater from 18 July 1942 to 11 August 1945, earning a Distinguished Unit Citation for missions in China in June 1944.

=== Cold War ===
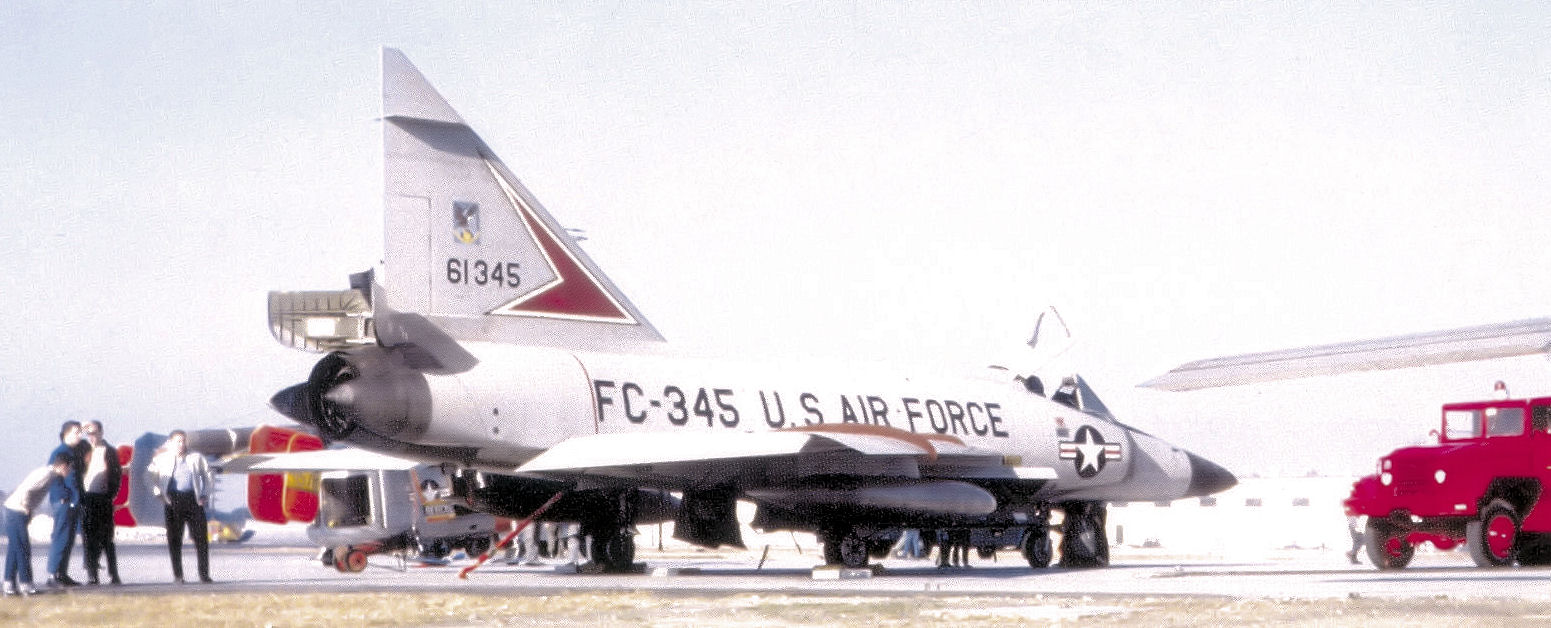
76th Fighter-Interceptor Squadron Convair F-102A 56–1345 at Westover AFB in October 1962

After World War II, the squadron performed air defense intercept operations in Guam, 1946–1949, in Panama, 1949, and at various bases in the eastern United States, 1955–1963.

By 1960 the squadron was stationed at McCoy Air Force Base, Florida. In 1960, "in order to position its diminishing interceptor force as nearly astride enemy approaches as possible", Air Defense Command received approval to move the squadron from McCoy to Westover Air Force Base in Massachusetts. It disposed of its Northrop F-89 Scorpions by the end of 1960. Between February and April 1961, the squadron had re-equipped with Convair F-102 Delta Daggers. Following the Cuban Missile Crisis, the Air Force decided to station a full squadron of interceptors at Homestead Air Force Base, Florida. This squadron was to be equipped with F-104A Starfighters, but the Air Force had transferred all its F-104 interceptors to the Air National Guard. F-104s were withdrawn from the 159th Fighter-Interceptor Squadron of the South Carolina Air National Guard and sent to Homestead. In turn, the F-102s at Westover were used to re-equip the 159th and the 76th was inactivated.

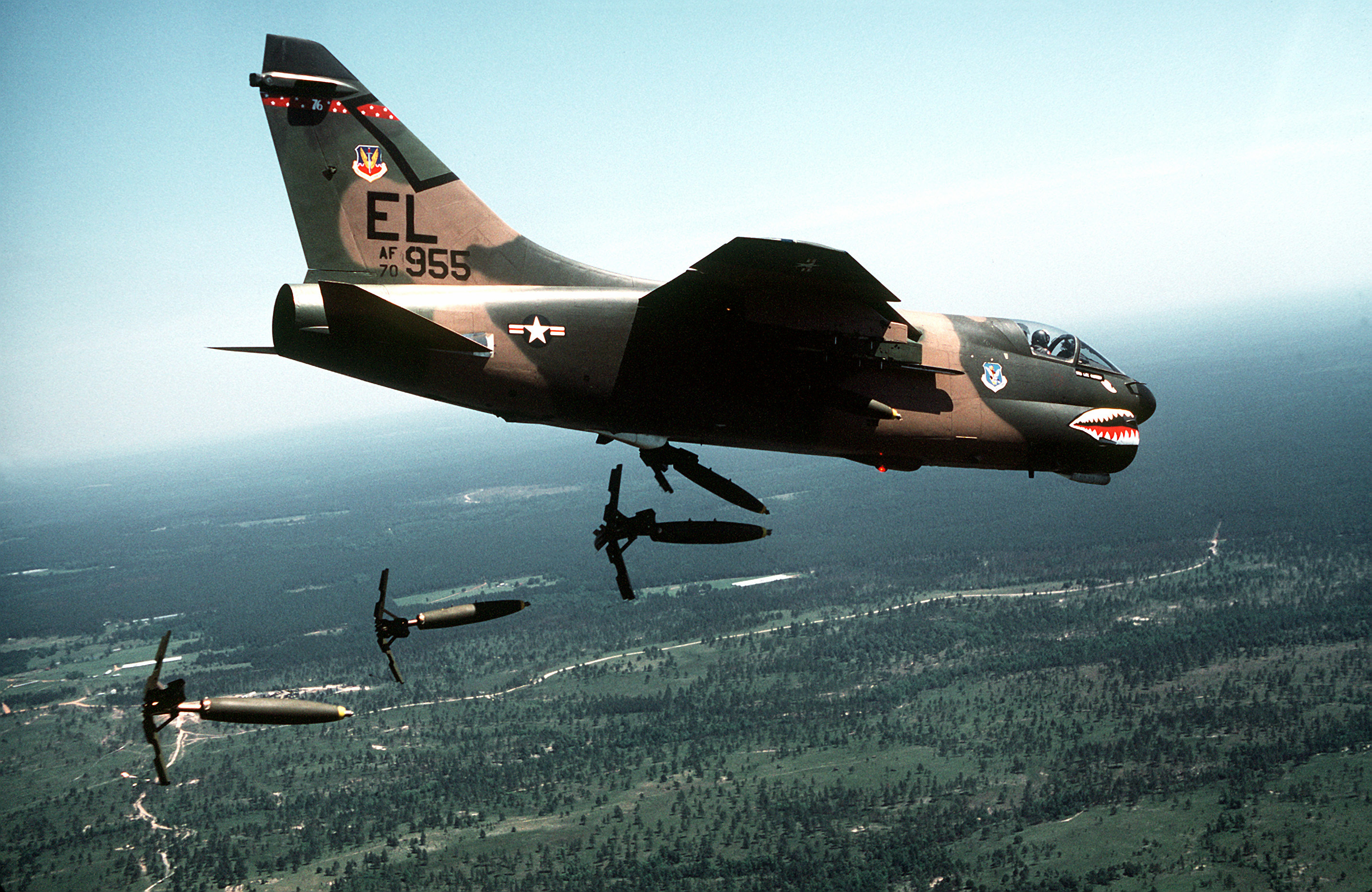
76th Tac Fighter Squadron A-7 Corsair II dropping Mark 82 bombs

The squadron trained in and conducted close air support operations, 1972–1992. A portion of the squadron deployed to Saudi Arabia in 1990 and took part in operations against Iraq in early 1991.

=== Space Operations era ===
Lessons from Desert Storm on space power convinced Air Force leaders to reactivate the squadron as the 76th Space Operations Squadron in December 1995. The squadron was activated at the National Test Facility at Falcon Air Force Base, Colorado as a component of the 14th Air Force on 1 December 1995.

The mission of the 76th SOPS was to assist air component commanders in understanding and applying space systems in support of air operations. The unit's aim was to ensure that command and control, communications, weather, navigation, and other space assets were used to most effectively multiply US and allied combat forces capabilities against an adversary.

The 76th deployed Air Force Space Support Teams to bring "space expertise" to expeditionary air forces and air operations centers around the world. Over their tenure, the 76th Space Operations Squadron deployed to make significant contributions during Operation Joint Endeavor, Operation Deny Flight, Operation Desert Fox, Operation Desert Thunder, and Operation Allied Force. It was inactivated in 2008 and its place taken by a newly constituted unit with the same designation.

=== Return as a Fighter Squadron ===
In 2009, the squadron was redesignated 76th Fighter Squadron and moved to Moody Air Force Base, Georgia, while

== Lineage ==
- Constituted as 76th Pursuit Squadron (Interceptor) on 17 December 1941

Redesignated 76th Fighter Squadron on 15 May 1942
Activated on 4 July 1942
Redesignated 76th Fighter Squadron, Single Engine on 28 February 1944
Inactivated on 5 January 1946

- Activated on 10 October 1946

Redesignated 76th Fighter Squadron, Jet on 3 May 1949
Inactivated on 24 September 1949

- Redesignated 76th Fighter-Interceptor Squadron on 20 June 1955

Activated on 18 August 1955
Discontinued and inactivated, on 1 July 1963

- Redesignated 76th Tactical Fighter Squadron on 18 May 1972

Activated on 1 October 1972
Redesignated 76th Fighter Squadron on 1 November 1991
Inactivated on 29 May 1992

- Redesignated 76th Space Operations Squadron on 21 November 1995

Activated on 1 December 1995
Inactivated on 21 January 2001

- Redesignated 76th Space Control Squadron and activated on 22 January 2001

Inactivated on 22 January 2008

- Redesignated 76th Fighter Squadron on 6 January 2009

Activated on 1 February 2009

=== Assignments ===
- 23d Fighter Group, 4 July 1942 – 5 January 1946
- 23d Fighter Group, 10 October 1946 – 24 September 1949
- 23d Fighter Group, 18 August 1955
- 35th Air Division, 9 November 1957
- 32d Air Division, 15 November 1958
- Boston Air Defense Sector, 1 February 1961 – 1 July 1963
- 23d Tactical Fighter (later, 23 Fighter) Wing, 1 October 1972 – 29 May 1992
- Fourteenth Air Force, 1 December 1995
- 614th Space Operations Group, 28 August 1998
- 21st Operations Group, 31 March 2000 – 21 January 2001
- 21st Operations Group, 22 January 2001 – 22 January 2008
- 476th Fighter Group, 1 February 2009 – present

=== Stations ===
- Wujiaba Airport, Kunming, China, 4 July 1941
- Guilin, China, 25 July 1942
- Kunming, China, 18 August 1942
- Lingling, China, 13 May 1943
- Hengyang, China, 11 August 1943

Detachment operated from Suichwan, China, 3 October – 7 December 1943

- Guilin, China, 21 November 1943
- Suichwan Airfield, Suichuan, China, 26 December 1943
- Lingling, China, 1 June 1944
- Liuzhou, China, July 1944
- Luliang, China, c. 12 September 1944
- Liuzhou, China, 24 August 1945
- Hangzhou, China, 15 October – 4 December 1945
- Fort Lewis, Washington, 3–5 January 1946
- Northwest Field (Guam), 10 October 1946 – 3 April 1949
- Howard Air Force Base, Panama Canal Zone, 25 April – 24 September 1949
- Presque Isle Air Force Base, Maine, 18 August 1955
- Pinecastle Air Force Base (later McCoy Air Force Base), Florida, 8 November 1957
- Westover Air Force Base, Massachusetts, 1 February 1961 – 1 July 1963
- England Air Force Base, Louisiana, 1 October 1972 – 29 May 1992

Deployed aircraft and personnel to King Fahd International Airport, Saudi Arabia, August 1990-April 1991

- Falcon Air Force Base (later, Schriever Air Force Base), Colorado, 1 December 1995
- Peterson Air Force Base, Colorado, 1 December 1999 – 21 January 2001; 22 January 2001 – 22 January 2008
- Moody Air Force Base, Georgia, 1 February 2009 – present

=== Aircraft ===
- Curtiss P-40 Warhawk, 1942–1944
- North American P-51 Mustang, 1944–1945
- Republic P-47 Thunderbolt, 1946–1949
- Lockheed RF-80 Shooting Star, 1949
- Northrop F-89D Scorpion, 1955–1957
- Northrop F-89H Scorpion, 1957–1959
- Northrop F-89J Scorpion, 1959–1961
- Convair F-102 Delta Dagger, 1961–1963
- LTV A-7D Corsair II, 1972–1981
- Fairchild Republic A-10 Thunderbolt II, 1981–1992, 2009–present
