= Yongzhou Lingling Airport =

Airport in Lengshuitan District, People's Republic of China

Yongzhou Lingling Airport 永州零陵机场
- IATA: LLF; ICAO: ZGLG

Summary
- Airport type: Public
- Serves: Yongzhou, Hunan
- Location: Lengshuitan District
- Elevation AMSL: 105 m / 344 ft
- Coordinates: 26°20′44″N 111°36′44″E

Map
- Location of airport in Hunan

Runways
Direction	Length		Surface
Direction	m	ft	Surface
18/36	2,600	8,530	Concrete

Statistics (2021)
- Passengers: 165,801
- Aircraft movements: 1,998
- Cargo (metric tons): 3.2

Yongzhou Lingling Airport
- Simplified Chinese: 永州零陵机场
- Traditional Chinese: 永州零陵機場
Transcriptions
Standard Mandarin
- Hanyu Pinyin: Yǒngzhōu Línglíng Jīchǎng

Yongzhou Lingling Airport (IATA: LLF, ICAO: ZGLG) is an airport serving the city of Yongzhou in Hunan Province, China. It is located in Lengshuitan District, 8.8 kilometers from the city center. The airport was first built in 1938 for military use and expanded several times. Commercial flights started in 2001, ceased in October 2005, and resumed in January 2008.

== Airlines and destinations ==
As of 2023, there are 2 airlines operating 2 routes at Yongzhou Lingling Airport, connecting 3 cities in total.

Airlines	Destinations
Air Chang'an	Haikou, Xi'an
China United Airlines	Beijing–Daxing

== Construction and plans ==
Yongzhou Lingling Airport can meet the annual passenger throughput of 770,000 passengers and 8,452 aircraft takeoffs and landings in 2025; in 2030, the annual passenger throughput and 12,299 aircraft takeoffs and landings are required.

== See also ==
- List of airports in China
- List of the busiest airports in China
