= Suichwan Airfield =

Former WW2 US Army Air Force airfield

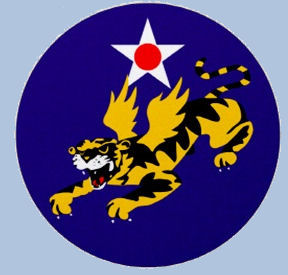
Suichwan Airfield
- Part of Fourteenth Air Force
- Yutianzhen, Suichuan County, Jiangxi Province, China

Site information
- Type: Military airfield
- Controlled by: United States Army Air Forces

Location
- Coordinates: 26°21′57″N 114°34′18″E

Site history
- Battles/wars: China Defensive Campaign 1942-1945

Suichwan Airfield is a former World War II United States Army Air Forces airfield in China, located approximately 2 miles southwest-west of Yutianzhen, Suichuan County, Jiangxi Province, China.

== History ==
The airfield was used primarily by forward photo-reconnaissance units flying unarmed P-38 Lightning aircraft over Japanese-occupied territory on intelligence gathering missions beginning in October 1943 until the end of the war. The airfield was evacuated in June 1944 due to Japanese units advancing in the area, then reactivated in November. It was again evacuated in late January 1945 in the face of a rapid Japanese advance. It was again activated on 30 April 1945. It was eventually closed at the end of the war in October 1945, and appears to have been abandoned. Aerial photography shows many remains of the field to this day.
