= 23rd Fighter Group =

Active US Air Force unit

23rd Fighter Group

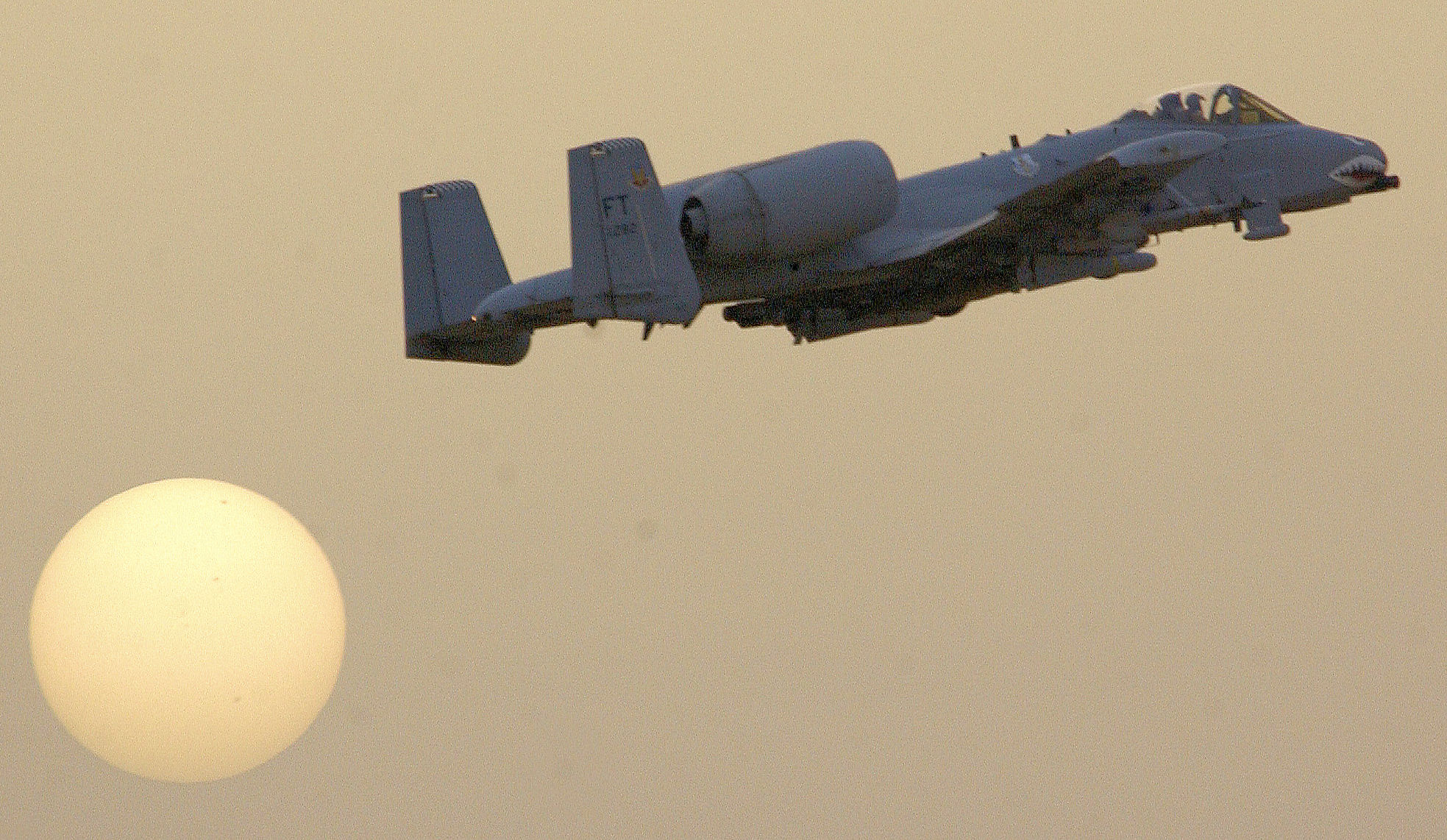
- Group A-10 Thunderbolt II attached to the 332nd Air Expeditionary Wing takes off from a forward-deployed location during Operation Iraqi Freedom.
- Active: 1942–1946; 1946–1949; 1951–1952; 1955–1959; 1991–1997; 2006–present
- Country: United States
- Branch: United States Air Force
- Role: Close Air Support
- Size: 900 personnel 48 A-10C aircraft
- Garrison/HQ: Moody Air Force Base, Georgia
- Nickname: Flying Tigers
- Mascot: Tiger with Wings
- Engagements: World War II; Iraqi no-fly zones conflict Operation Uphold Democracy; War on terror Iraq War
- Decorations: Distinguished Unit Citation

Commanders
- Current commander: Colonel Nicholas DiCapua
- Notable commanders: Col. Robert L. Scott; General Bruce K. Holloway; Brig, Gen. David Lee "Tex" Hill; Col. Edward F. Rector

Insignia
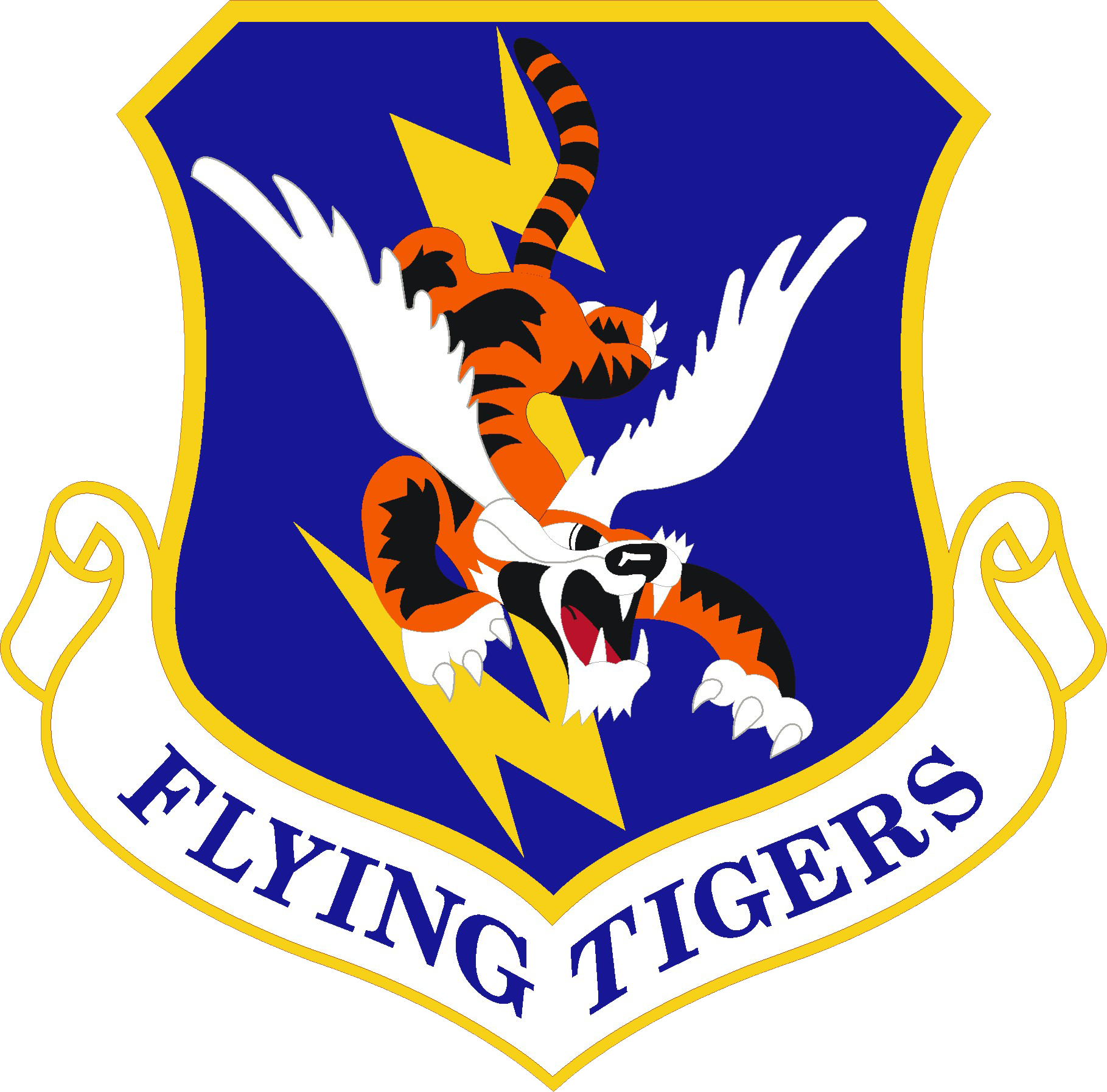
- 23rd Wing emblem (Note: Approved 24 January 1957.)
- Tail code: FT

The 23rd Fighter Group is a United States Air Force unit. It is assigned to the 23rd Wing and stationed at Moody Air Force Base, Georgia.

The group was established in World War II as the 23rd Pursuit Group of the United States Army Air Forces (USAAF). Redesignated the 23rd Fighter Group before its activation, the group was formed in China on 4 July 1942, as a component of the China Air Task Force and received a small cadre of volunteer personnel from the simultaneously disbanded 1st American Volunteer Group (AVG) – the "Flying Tigers" of the Chinese Air Force.

To carry on the traditions and commemorate the history of the AVG, aircraft of the USAF 23rd Fighter Group carry the same "Shark Teeth" nose art of the AVG's Curtiss P-40 Warhawks, along with the "FT" (Flying Tiger) tail code. The 23rd Fighter Group's aircraft are the only United States Air Force aircraft currently authorized to carry this distinctive and historical aircraft marking.

== Mission ==
Currently based at Moody Air Force Base, Georgia, the group is one of two operations groups of the 23rd Wing at Moody. The other group at Moody is the 347th Rescue Group. Both organizations serve as part of the Fifteenth Air Force and Air Combat Command. The 23rd Fighter Group's primary missions are forward air control, close air support, air interdiction and combat search and rescue operations.

The group has two operational squadrons assigned: the 74th and the 75th Fighter Squadrons both flying Fairchild Republic A-10 Thunderbolt II attack aircraft.

== History ==
=== World War II ===
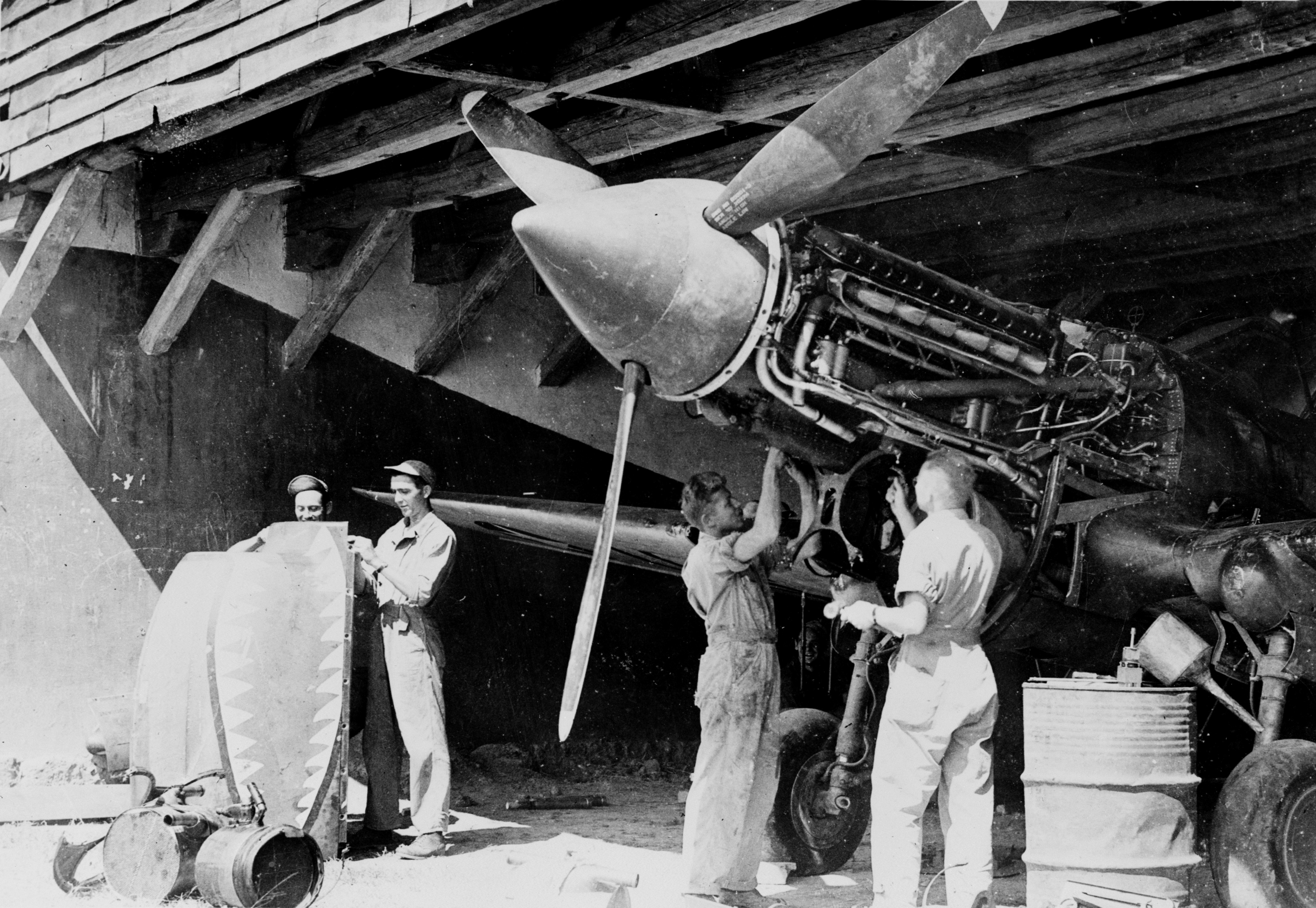
Ground crews servicing a P-40 of the 23rd FG in 1942.

By 15 June 1942, under orders from Tenth Air Force, an advance cadre of pilots and aircraft had proceeded over the Hump to Kunming, China, for combat familiarization. Without ceremony, the 23rd Fighter Group was activated 4 July 1942, marking the first such activation of a United States fighter unit on a field of battle in World War II. (Note: The 103rd Aero Squadron received its pilots in France in February 1918 from members of the Lafayette Escadrille and the Lafayette Flying Corps, although its enlisted members had been with the squadron since the summer of 1917. Maurer, Combat Squadrons, pp. 314–17. All of the American Expeditionary Forces Air Service groups that fought in World War I, including the 1st Pursuit Group and 1st Day Bombardment Group, both of which are currently active, were formed in France as well. The activation of the 23rd Fighter Group in China preceded that of the 4th Fighter Group in England (from the former RAF Eagle Squadrons) by almost three months. Maurer, Combat Units, pp. 35–37, 73–75.)

Claire L. Chennault, meanwhile, had been recalled to active duty with the rank of brigadier general and placed at the head of the China Air Task Force (later to grow into Fourteenth Air Force). The 23rd Fighter Group became a component of the Task Force and was assigned three squadrons, the 74th, 75th, and 76th Fighter Squadrons.

The group inherited the mission of the American Volunteer Group "Flying Tigers" (AVG). Five of Chennault's staff officers, five pilots and 19 ground crewmen entered the United States Army Air Forces and became members of the 23rd Fighter Group. Approximately 25 Flying Tiger pilots, still in civilian status, volunteered to extend their contracts for two weeks to train the new group following the disbanding of their organization. The original aircraft of the group were a mixture of Curtiss P-40 Warhawks from a batch of 50 sent to China for the AVG between January and June 1942, and a follow-up shipment of 68 P-40Es transferred from the 51st Fighter Group in India and flown over the Hump by personnel to be assigned to the 23rd, also mostly from the 51st Group.

Others from the ranks of the original Flying Tigers left China when their contracts expired, although some returned to duty later with the Army Air Forces in the China-Burma-India Theater. In addition to inheriting operational responsibilities from the AVG, the 23rd Fighter Group also benefited from the knowledge and experience of the AVG pilots, and took on the nickname of the disbanded unit.

Col. Robert L. Scott Jr., already in India as a commander of the Hump operation, became the first commander of the 23rd Fighter Group. He would later author the military classic, "God Is My Co-Pilot." On the very first day of its activation, the 23rd Fighter Group engaged three successive waves of enemy aircraft and promptly recorded the destruction of five enemy aircraft with no losses to itself.

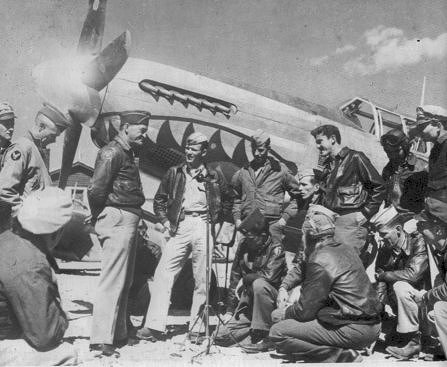
General Claire Chennault with a P-51 Mustang and pilots of the 23rd FG

The next three years saw the 23rd Fighter Group involved in much of the action over southeast and southwest Asia. It provided air defense for the Chinese terminus of the Hump route, but its operations extended beyond China to Burma, French Indochina and as far as Taiwan. The unit helped pioneer a number of innovative fighter and fighter-bomber tactics. The group used its so-called "B-40" (P-40's carrying 1,000-pound bombs) to destroy Japanese bridges and kill bridge repair crews, sometimes demolishing their target with a single bomb. The unit gained another increase in capability with its conversion to the North American P-51 Mustang aircraft in November 1943. Representative of the encounters undertaken by this small and often ill-equipped group was the defense against a major Japanese push down the Hsiang Valley in Hunan 17–25 June 1944. Ignoring inhibiting weather conditions and heavy ground fire, the 23rd Fighter Group provided air support for Chinese land forces and repeatedly struck at enemy troops and transportation. Its efforts in this instance earned it the Distinguished Unit Citation. In 1945 it help turn the Japanese spring offensive and harassed the retreating Japanese by strafing and bombing their columns.

Before the 23rd Fighter Group returned to the United States in December 1945, it was credited with destroying 621 enemy planes in air combat, plus 320 more on the ground; with sinking more than 131,000 tons of enemy shipping and damaging another 250,000 tons; and with causing an estimated enemy troop loss of more than 20,000. These statistics were compiled through a total of more than 24,000 combat sorties, requiring more than 53,000 flying hours, and at a cost of 110 aircraft lost in aerial combat, 90 shot down by surface defenses, and 28 bombed while on the ground. Thirty-two pilots of the group achieved ace status by shooting down five or more enemy aircraft.

The 23rd Fighter Group left the theater in December 1945 and was inactivated 5 January 1946, at Fort Lewis, Washington.

=== Postwar Era ===
The 23rd Fighter Group was reactivated 10 October 1946, in Guam and assigned to the Twentieth Air Force, equipped with the long-range Republic P-47N Thunderbolt, replacing the 21st Fighter Group and assuming its equipment, personnel, and mission. While stationed in Guam, the 23rd became a part of the United States Air Force (USAF) when it became a separate military service on 18 September 1947. In 1948 it was assigned to the 23rd Fighter Wing as part of the USAF Wing/Base Reorganization, which was intended to unify command and control on air bases by assigning operational and support groups to a single headquarters. In April 1949, the group moved with the wing to Howard Air Force Base in the Panama Canal Zone, where it assumed the air defense mission of the Panama Canal, taking over the personnel and equipment of the 5600th Composite Group. It was inactivated along with the wing a few months later when the Air Force consolidated its operations in the Panama Canal Zone at Albrook Air Force Base.

==== Air Defense Command ====
The group was redesignated as the 23rd Fighter-Interceptor Group (FIG), activated once again and assigned to the 23rd Fighter-Interceptor Wing (FIW) at Presque Isle Air Force Base, Maine as part of Air Defense Command (ADC), with the 74th and 75th Fighter-Interceptor Squadrons (FIS) assigned, flying North American F-86E Sabre aircraft. Before the year was over, both squadrons had converted to older F-86As. In February 1952, the wing and group were inactivated, in a major reorganization of Air Defense Command (ADC) responding to ADC's difficulty under the existing wing base organizational structure in deploying fighter squadrons to best advantage.

In August 1955, ADC implemented Project Arrow, which was designed to bring back on the active list the fighter units which had compiled memorable records in the two world wars. As a result of this project, the group, now designated the 23rd Fighter Group (Air Defense), replaced the 528th Air Defense Group at Presque Isle and once again assumed command of the 75th and 76 FIS, which also returned to Presque Isle to replace the 82nd and 319th FIS, because Project Arrow was also designed to reunite wartime squadrons with their traditional headquarters. However, the two squadrons were now operating Northrop F-89 Scorpions In addition, the group assumed USAF host responsibility for Presque Isle and was assigned the 23rd USAF Infirmary (later USAF Dispensary), 23rd Air Base Squadron, 23rd Materiel Squadron, and in 1957, the 23rd Consolidated Aircraft Maintenance Squadron to carry out these duties. In 1957, the group converted from the F-89D to the nuclear capable F-89H armed with AIR-2 Genie rockets. In 1958, the 76th FIS moved to McCoy Air Force Base, Florida and was assigned away from the group. The 75th FIS was in the process of converting to F-101 Voodoos, when the group was inactivated in 1959 as Presque Isle was being transferred to Strategic Air Command as host base for the SM-62 Snark Missile and the 702nd Strategic Missile Wing.

=== Reactivation ===
==== 23rd Operations Group ====
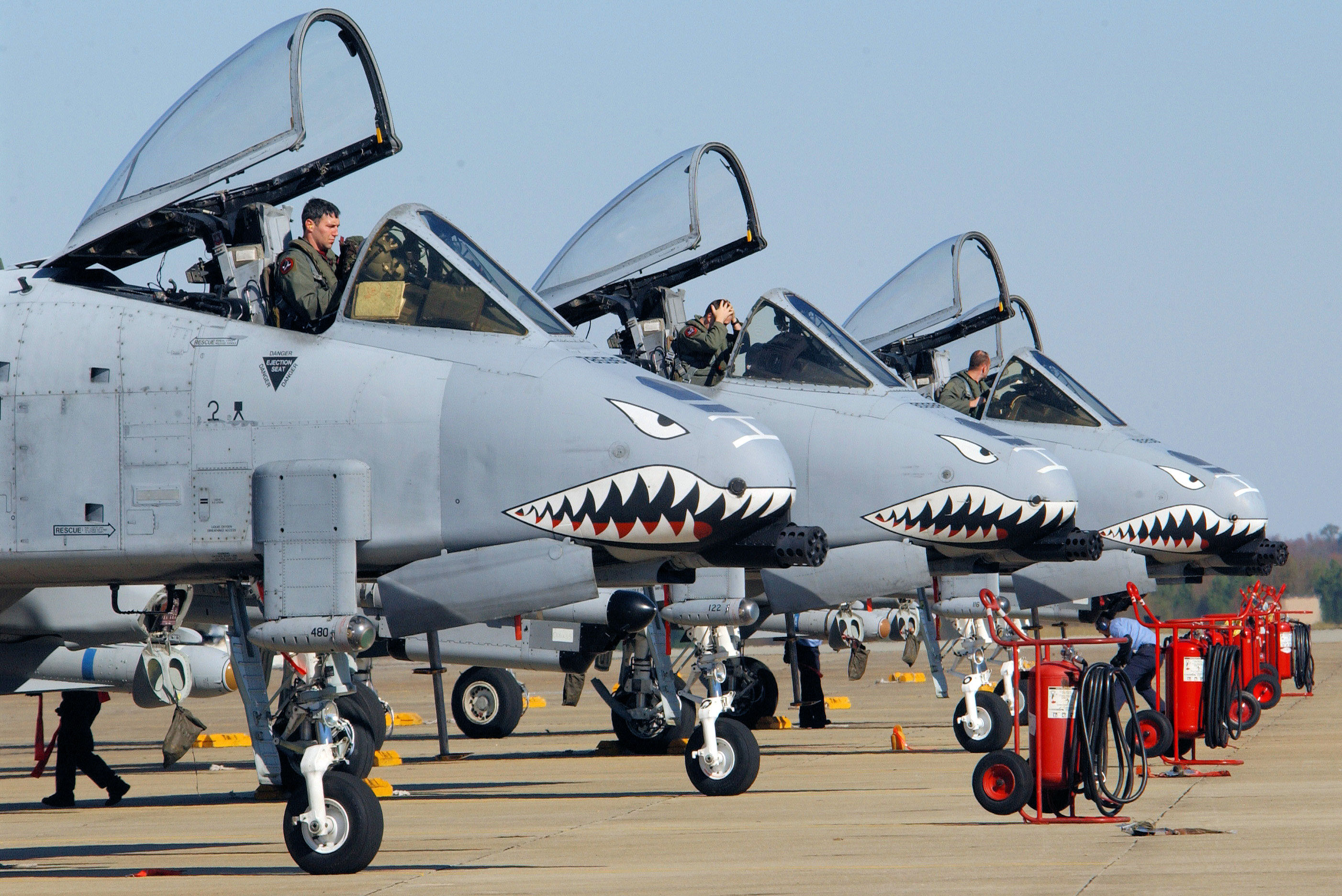
23rd Fighter Group A-10 Thunderbolt IIs on alert

On 1 June 1992, the 23rd Tactical Fighter Group was redesignated the 23rd Operations Group and activated at Pope Air Force Base, North Carolina under the redesignated 23rd Wing under the USAF Objective Wing plan. It was given the mission of controlling the flying components of the parent 23rd Wing. These included both fighters providing close air support and theater airlift aircraft.

In December 1992, Lockheed C-130 Hercules aircraft from the group's 2nd Airlift Squadron deployed to Mombasa, Kenya, to participate in Operation Provide Relief. The aircraft and crews delivered tons of food and other relief supplies to small airstrips throughout Somalia. 23rd Wing C-130s were also tasked to assist in other humanitarian relief efforts, to include Hurricane Andrew in Florida. They also airdropped relief supplies into Bosnia and Herzegovina and flew relief missions into Sarajevo for more than 28 months.

In September 1994, its C-130s participated in what was to be the largest combat personnel drop since World War II, Operation Uphold Democracy. They were to assist in dropping more than 3,000 paratroopers from the 82nd Airborne Division onto Port au Prince Airport, Haiti. The invasion force was recalled at the last minute after word that the Haitian president had resigned upon hearing that the aircraft were on their way. The 75th Fighter Squadron's A-10s deployed their aircraft to Shaw Air Force Base, South Carolina, where they were scheduled to launch close air support operations for the invasion force before recovering in Puerto Rico.

The first operational deployment of a composite wing happened in October 1994, when Iraqi troops began massing near the Kuwaiti Border. Within 72 hours, 56 aircraft and 1,500 personnel deployed to the Persian Gulf region for Operation Vigilant Warrior. Eventually, the 75th Fighter Squadron redeployed to Al Jaber Air Base, Kuwait, becoming the first U.S. fixed-wing aircraft to be stationed in that country since the end of the Gulf War.

On 1 July 1996, the 74th Fighter Squadron's F-16C/D Fighting Falcons were transferred to the 27th Fighter Wing's 524th Fighter Squadron at Cannon Air Force Base, New Mexico, and the squadron transitioned to Fairchild Republic A-10 Thunderbolt II received from the 20th Fighter Wing's 55th Fighter Squadron at Shaw. This gave the 23rd Group a second A-10 squadron.

==== 23rd Fighter Group ====
On 1 April 1997, the 23rd Operations Group was inactivated and replaced by the downsized 23rd Wing, which was redesignated as the 23rd Fighter Group. The 23rd Fighter Group was assigned to the 347th Wing of Air Combat Command at Moody Air Force Base, Georgia but the group remained at Pope as a Geographically Separated Unit (GSU). Its C-130s and Pope Air Force Base were realigned to Air Mobility Command and assigned to the 43rd Airlift Wing.

In June 2023, the USAF announced that two squadrons of Lockheed Martin F-35 Lightning II will be based at Moody AFB from 2029 to replace the 23rd Fighter Group's A-10C Thunderbolt IIs.

==== Moody Air Force Base ====
On 1 October 2006, the 347th Rescue Wing at Moody redesignated as the 347th Rescue Group, while the 23rd Fighter Group was expanded and redesignated the 23rd Wing. Along with the 347th Rescue Group, the original 23rd Fighter Group was reactivated, this time at Moody Air Force Base, for only the second time in over fifty years. The 23rd Fighter Group was then assigned as one of the 23rd Wing's operations groups, although retaining the designation of "Fighter Group".

Both the 23rd Wing and 23rd Fighter Group are charged with carrying on the historic Flying Tiger's heritage.

== Lineage ==
- Constituted as the 23rd Pursuit Group (Interceptor) on 17 December 1941

Redesignated 23rd Fighter Group on 15 May 1942
Activated on 4 July 1942
Inactivated on 5 January 1946

- Redesignated 23rd Fighter Group, Single Engine in 1946

Activated on 10 October 1946

- Redesignated 23rd Fighter Group, Jet on 3 May 1949

Inactivated on 24 September 1949

- Redesignated 23rd Fighter-Interceptor Group on 19 December 1950

Activated on 12 January 1951
Inactivated on 6 February 1952

- Redesignated 23rd Fighter Group (Air Defense) on 20 June 1955

Activated on 18 August 1955
Inactivated on 1 July 1959
Redesignated 23rd Tactical Fighter Group on 31 July 1985 (remained inactive)

- Redesignated 23rd Operations Group, and activated, on 1 June 1992

Inactivated on 1 April 1997

- Redesignated: 23rd Fighter Group on 26 September 2006

Activated on 1 October 2006

=== Assignments ===
- Tenth Air Force China Air Task Force, 4 July 1942
- Fourteenth Air Force, 10 March 1943 – 5 January 1946
- 20th Fighter Wing (later 46th Fighter Wing), 10 October 1946
- 23rd Fighter Wing, 16 August 1948 – 24 September 1949
- 23rd Fighter-Interceptor Wing, 12 January 1951 – 6 February 1952
- 4711th Air Defense Wing, 18 August 1955
- 32nd Air Division (Defense), 1 March 1956
- Bangor Air Defense Sector, 1 August 1958 – 1 July 1959
- 23rd Wing, 1 June 1992 – 1 April 1997
- 23rd Wing, 1 October 2006 – present

=== Components ===
- 2nd Airlift Squadron: 1 June 1992 – 1 April 1997
- 16th Fighter Squadron: attached, 4 July 1942 – 19 October 1943
- 41st Airlift Squadron: 16 July 1993 – 1 April 1997
- 74th Fighter Squadron: 4 July 1942 – 5 January 1946; 10 October 1946 – 24 September 1949; 12 January 1951 – 6 February 1952; 15 June 1993 – 1 April 1997; 1 October 2006 – present
- 75th Fighter Squadron (later 75th Fighter-Interceptor Squadron, 75th Fighter Squadron): 4 July 1942 – 5 January 1946; 10 October 1946 – 24 September 1949; 12 January 1951 – 6 February 1952; 18 August 1955 – 1 July 1959; 1 June 1992 – 1 April 1997; 1 October 2006 – present
- 76th Fighter Squadron (later, 76th Fighter-Interceptor Squadron): 4 July 1942 – 5 January 1946; 10 October 1946 – 24 September 1949; 18 August 1955 – 9 November 1957
- 118th Tactical Reconnaissance Squadron: attached, May 1945 – Aug 1945
- 132nd Fighter-Interceptor Squadron: attached, 21 July 1951 – 2 August 1951
- 134th Fighter Interception Squadron: attached, Jan 1951 -2 August 1951
- 449th Fighter Squadron: attached, Jul 1943–19 October 1943
- 598th Range Squadron: 22 Sep 2015–present

=== Stations ===
- Kunming Airport, China, 4 July 1942
- Kweilin Airfield, China, c. Sept 1943
- Liuchow Airfield, China, 8 September 1944
- Luliang Airfield, China, 14 September 1944
- Liuchow Airfield, China, Aug 1945
- Hanchow Airfield, China, c. 10 October – 12 December 1945
- Fort Lewis, Washington, 3 – 5 January 1946
- Northwest Field (later, Northwest Guam Air Force Base), Guam, 10 October 1946 – 3 April 1949
- Howard Air Force Base, Canal Zone, 25 April – 24 September 1949
- Presque Isle Air Force Base, Maine, 12 January 1951 – 6 February 1952; 18 August 1955 – 1 July 1959
- Pope Air Force Base, North Carolina, 1 June 1992 – 30 July 2007
- Moody Air Force Base, Georgia, 30 July 2007 – present

=== Awards and campaigns ===
Award streamer	Award	Dates	Notes
	Distinguished Unit Citation	17 June 1944–25 June 1944	23rd Fighter Group Hunan Province, China
	Air Force Meritorious Unit Award	1 June 2008–31 May 2010	23rd Fighter Group
	Air Force Outstanding Unit Award	31 May 1995–31 March 1997	23rd Operations Group
	Air Force Outstanding Unit Award	[30 July 2007]-31 May 2008	23rd Fighter Group

Campaign Streamer	Campaign	Dates	Notes
	India-Burma	2 April 1943 – 28 January 1945	23rd Fighter Group
	China Defensive	4 July 1942 – 4 May 1945	23rd Fighter Group
	Western Pacific	17 April 1944 – 2 September 1945	23rd Fighter Group
	China Offensive	5 May 1945 – 2 September 1945	23rd Fighter Group
