= Anna Chennault =

Chinese-American reporter (1923–2018)

Anna Chan Chennault
- 陳香梅
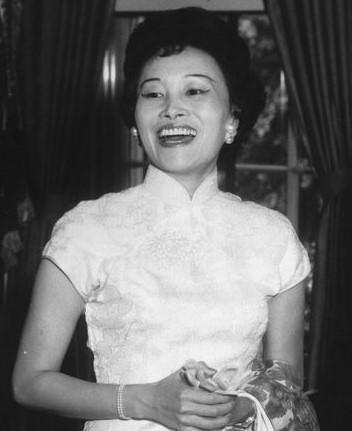
- Born: Chan Sheng Mai; June 23, 1923; Peking, China
- Died: March 30, 2018 (aged 94); Washington, D.C., U.S.
- Occupation: Journalist
- Political party: Republican
- Spouse: Claire Lee Chennault (m. 1947; died 1958)
- Children: 2
- Relatives: Liao Zhongkai (great–uncle)

Anna Chan Chennault (born Chan Sheng Mai, Chinese: 陳香梅; June 23, 1923 – March 30, 2018) was a war correspondent and prominent Republican member of the U.S. China Lobby. She was married to American World War II aviator General Claire Chennault.

Controversy surrounds Anna Chennault for the crucial role she played on behalf of Richard Nixon's 1968 presidential campaign in seeking to delay the Vietnam War peace negotiations, in order to boost Nixon's chances for victory.

== Early life and education ==
On June 23, 1923, Chen was born in Peking (Beijing). In 1935, her father, a diplomat, was sent to be the Chinese consul in Mexicali, Mexico, but he could not afford to bring his large family there. Fearing war between Japan and China was brewing, he sent his wife and children to the British crown colony of Hong Kong to live with his mother. In 1938, Chen's mother died, and as an older sister, Chen became a mother figure to her younger sisters. As a girl, Chen was told by two of her teachers that her birthday falling on "fifth day of the fifth moon" on the Chinese calendar meant that she was destined to be a writer. On the morning of December 8, 1941, Chen was attending class at St. Paul's High School when she was forced to take cover, as the Japanese had bombed the school. Chen witnessed the battle of Hong Kong as the invading Japanese fought British, Indian and Canadian troops, ending with the surrender of Hong Kong on Christmas Day. In the interim, Chen spent much time hiding to avoid the bombs and shells as Hong Kong went up in flames. Chen and her five sisters fled Hong Kong to Guilin in "Free China" to escape the Japanese. She attended Lingnan University, which was normally based in Hong Kong, but had relocated to "Free China". As refugees, Chen and her sisters lived in poverty during the war years, often having to eat weevil-ridden rice to survive. Chen remembered that her desire to be successful as a writer was to escape both her low status as a Chinese woman and the poverty of wartime China.

Chen received a bachelor's degree in Chinese from Lingnan University in 1944. She was a war correspondent for the Central News Agency from 1944 to 1948 and wrote for the Hsin Ming Daily News in Shanghai from 1945 to 1949. While visiting her sister Cynthia Chan, a U.S. Army nurse in Kunming, she met General Claire Chennault, head of the Flying Tiger group. While working as a journalist in 1944, the 21-year-old Chen interviewed General Chennault, a man who was widely viewed in China as a war hero who had protected the Chinese people from Japanese bombing since 1937. After the interview, Chen had tea with Chennault, whose gentlemanly behavior and Southern charm left her feeling "awed", as she later remembered.

== Marriage ==
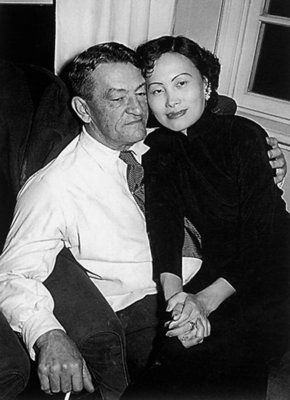
Anna Chennault and her husband

Chen Xiangmei and Chennault, who was 30 years her senior, married in December 1947. In 1946, Chennault had divorced his first wife, the former Nell Thompson, whom he had wed in 1911 in Winnsboro, Louisiana, and the mother of his eight children, the youngest of whom, Rosemary Chennault Simrall, died in August 2013. Anna Chennault had two children, Claire Anna (born in February 1949) and Cynthia Louise (born in 1950). After the war her husband was somewhat of a celebrity. A heavy smoker, he died in 1958 of lung cancer. The Chennaults divided their time between Taipei and Monroe, Louisiana, where Anna Chennault became the first non-white person to settle into a previously all-white neighborhood; General Chennault's status as a war hero silenced objections to his Chinese wife. At the time, a law forbade non-whites from settling in the Monroe neighborhood in which General Chennault had bought his house and an anti-miscegenation law made their marriage illegal in Louisiana, but no one dared to prosecute him for bringing Anna with him into the neighborhood.

General Chennault was a Sinophile and a strong admirer of Chiang Kai-shek, and in the 1940s, he joined the China Lobby, an informal and diverse group of journalists, businessmen, politicians, intellectuals and Protestant churchmen who believed that it was in the best interest of the United States to support the Kuomintang regime. Chiang had converted to Methodism to marry his third wife Soong Mei-ling in 1927, and for much of his life, Chiang was seen by American evangelical Protestant groups as China's great Christian hope, the man who would modernize and westernize China. After the Kuomintang lost the Chinese Civil War, there was much fury by American right-wing politicians about the "loss of China", and though the China Lobby was not officially partisan, the China Lobby tended to tilt rightward after 1949. The narrative promoted by the China Lobby pictured an idealized version of the Kuomintang government that was heartlessly betrayed by the Truman Administration, which was depicted as incompetent for allowing the loss of China or for even having permitted alleged Soviet agents to carry out the China policy of the United States. A 1952 dinner hosted by the Nationalist Chinese ambassador (Wellington Koo) in Washington, D.C., attended by senators Patrick McCarran, William Knowland and Joseph McCarthy, all partisans of the China Lobby, began with the toast "Back to the mainland!"

Anna Chennault ultimately followed her husband into the China Lobby, and by 1955, she was regularly delivering speeches calling for American support of Chiang and Taiwan as well as the eventual return of the Kuomintang to mainland China. Fluent in English, a good speaker, and as a Chinese-American woman who was presumably in a position to know what was best for China, Chennault became a popular figure for the China Lobby through her speeches. After she spoke in Dallas in May 1955, a Dallas Morning News editorial called Chennault someone whose "opinions were worth listening to" and "a personage in her own right, by inheritance and achievement, as well as by marriage."

== Life as a widow ==
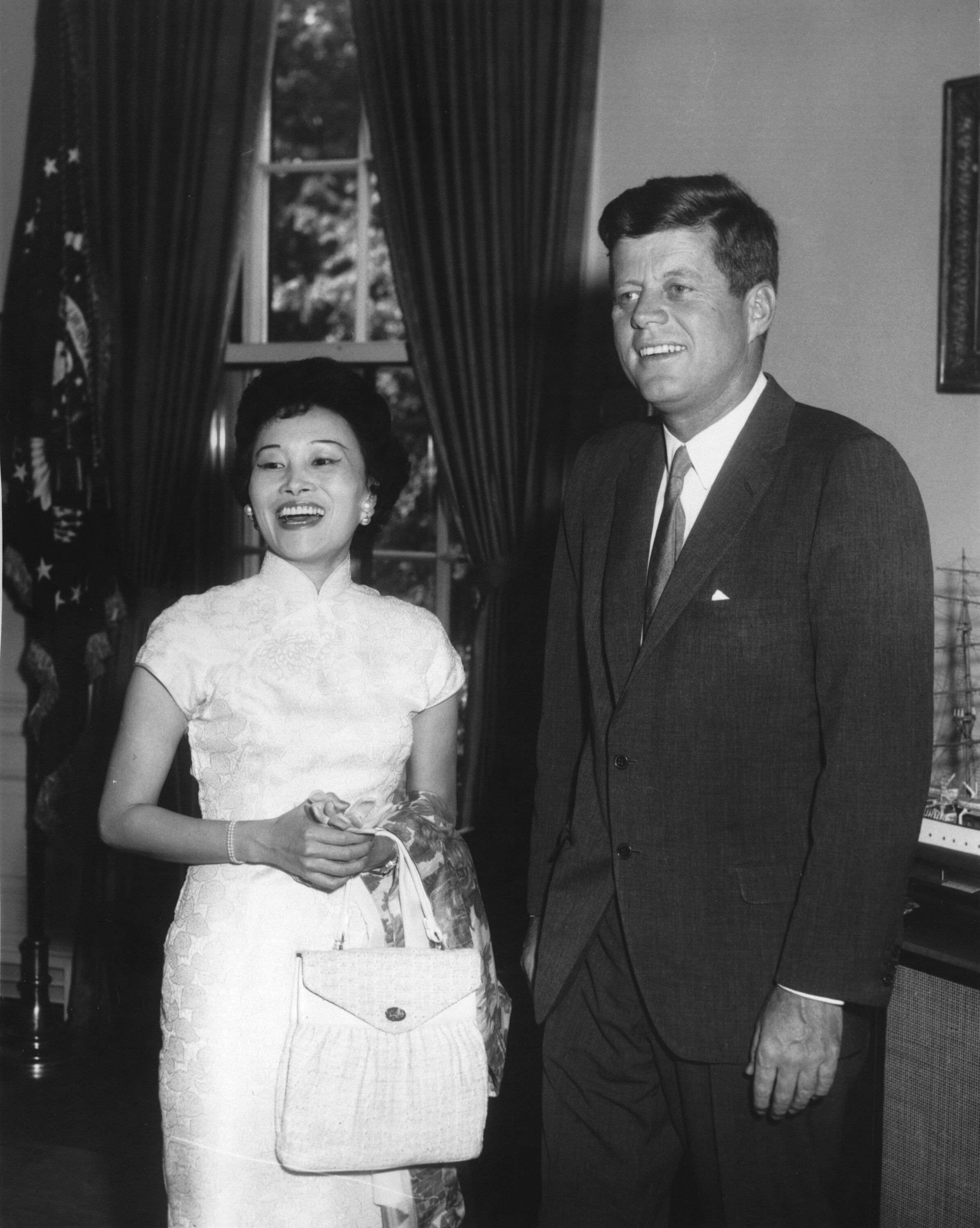
Chennault with President John F. Kennedy in 1962

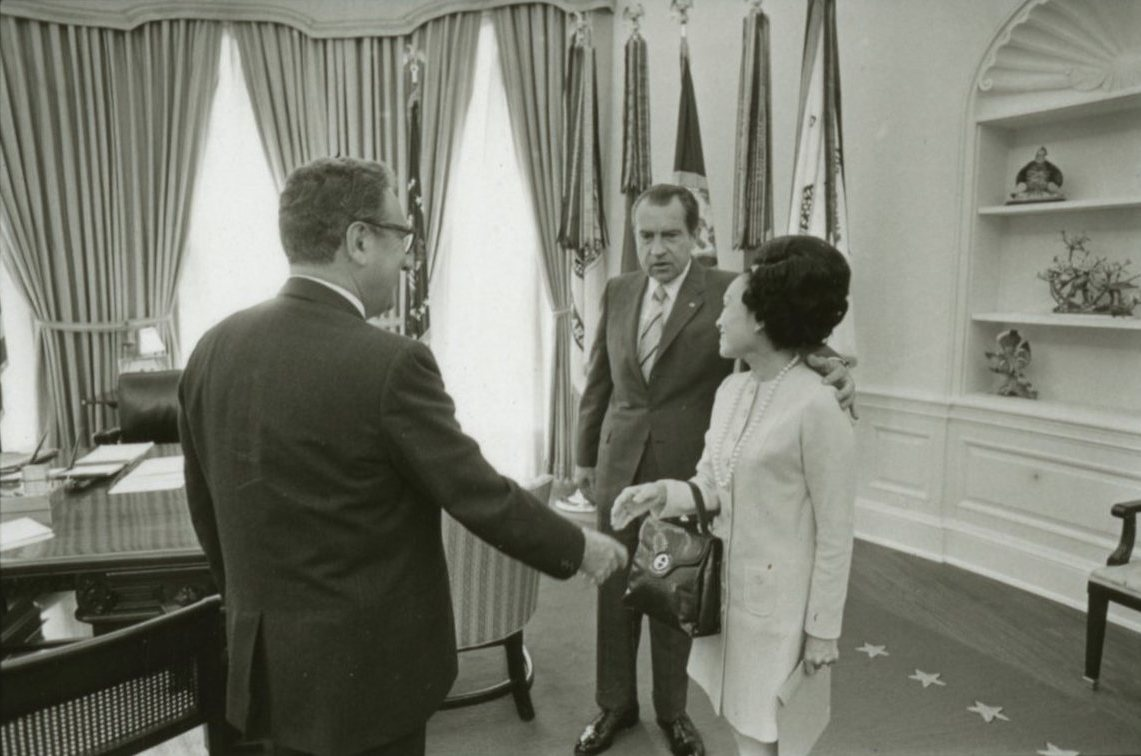
Chennault with President Richard Nixon and Henry Kissinger in 1971

In 1894, the state of Louisiana had passed a law forbidding marriage between whites and non-whites, and General Chennault was advised by his lawyer that his marriage to Anna was "null and void" in Louisiana and that the state would therefore not respect his will leaving his assets to his wife and daughters. Because his first wife and his children by his first marriage might challenge the will in court on the grounds that his second marriage was illegal and his daughters by Anna were thus illegitimate, he had his will probated in Washington, D.C., where his second marriage was recognized as legal. In his will, Claire Chennault left more money for Anna and her children, but left all of his shares in the Civil Air Transport company and the Flying Tiger Line to his first wife and her daughters.

After her husband's death, Anna Chennault worked as a publicist for Civil Air Transport in Taipei, Taiwan (1946–1957), as vice president of international affairs for the Flying Tiger Line and as president of TAC International (from 1976). In 1960, Chennault gained her first political experience when she campaigned for Richard Nixon, being used as the Republicans' principal campaigner among Chinese-Americans. She was an occasional correspondent for the Central News Agency (from 1965) and the U.S. correspondent for the Hsin Shen Daily News (from 1958). She was a broadcaster for the Voice of America from 1963 to 1966. Chennault began a career as a society hostess in Washington, a role that biographer Catherine Forslund wrote had "an edge no men could match", allowing her to create "a powerful base of influence and connections." Chennault often noted that her "certain exotic Asian aura" helped to forge connections in the otherwise all-white society scene of Washington. Her belief that the U.S. had abandoned the Kuomintang in the Chinese Civil War colored her perceptions of the Vietnam War, making her an ardent hawk who argued that the U.S. had a moral obligation to stand by South Vietnam and that any effort to withdraw from Vietnam would be equivalent to the "betrayal" of Chiang Kai-shek in the 1940s.

In 1958, Mao Zedong launched the Great Leap Forward in China, which led to a famine estimated to have killed between 30 and 55 million people. As a result, thousands of Chinese fled to Hong Kong as refugees. Chennault was very active as the president of a group named Chinese Refugee Relief (CRR), which sought to care for the destitute refugees in Hong Kong. In 1962, Chennault testified before the Senate in an appeal for the U.S. government to fund the CRR. Recalling her own life as a refugee in wartime China, Chennault said: "I know the misery of physical deprivation of the homeless and the emotional privation of the forgotten." She called her late husband "the symbol of deliverance to the Chinese people from the cruelty of the Japanese" and stated she "was now engaged in the unfinished business of delivering the Chinese people from the cruelty of the Communists." Chennault called the leaders of the People's Republic of China "masters of Chinese slavery" who callously used food as "an instrument of life and death to kill freedom." Chennault wanted famine relief to benefit only the Chinese people and not the Chinese state, saying "We would be making the same mistake we did when under the pressure of scrap dealers we shipped scrap iron to Japan before Pearl Harbor. Such impossible appeasement would be shot back in our faces in Southeast Asia as it was shot back at Pearl Harbor and Korea. Do you put troops in Thailand and Vietnam to face Chinese Communists made strong with our own food?" Throughout the late 1950s and early 1960s, Chennault worked hard to publicize the famine in China caused by the Great Leap Forward and to appeal to the American people to donate money for the CRR and to adopt refugee orphans living in Hong Kong.

Chennault's strong anticommunism led her to favor the Republicans, and in the 1964 presidential election, she worked hard as a volunteer and fundraiser for Senator Barry Goldwater, who was generally considered to be the most aggressive and hawkish of all Republican politicians at the time. Goldwater had voted against the Civil Rights Act of 1964, which led to accusations of racism and engagement in a "Southern Strategy" of courting conservative Southern whites who had traditionally voted Democratic by opposing civil rights for blacks. To counter such allegations, Chennault played a prominent role as a speaker for Goldwater in the 1964 election, appearing on stage with him several times starting in April 1964. Chennault was useful to the Goldwater campaign not only for her work in attempting to persuade Chinese-Americans to vote Republican, but importantly to attract the support of nonwhite voters who opposed Goldwater's vote against the Civil Rights Act.

== Vietnam and the "Chennault Affair" ==
On March 31, 1968, President Lyndon B. Johnson announced that he was withdrawing from the 1968 presidential election, announced a partial halt to the bombing of North Vietnam and stated his willingness to open peace talks with North Vietnam on ending the war. After much haggling about where to hold the peace negotiations, talks finally began in Paris in May 1968 with W. Averell Harriman heading the American delegation and Xuân Thủy the North Vietnamese delegation.

In the 1968 election, Chennault served as the chairwoman of the Republican Women for Nixon Committee. According to records of President Lyndon B. Johnson's secret monitoring of South Vietnamese officials and his political foes, Chennault played a crucial role on behalf of the Nixon campaign, which sought to sabotage the rapidly progressing peace treaty in what one long-term Washington insider called "activities ... far beyond the bounds of justifiable political combat."

On July 12, 1968, at the Hotel Pierre in New York, Chennault introduced South Vietnamese ambassador Bùi Diễm to Nixon. Unknown to Diễm, he was followed secretly by the CIA, who kept him under surveillance while the National Security Agency (NSA), which had broken the South Vietnamese diplomatic codes, read all of the messages going back and forth from the South Vietnamese embassy in Washington.

In June 1967, Henry Kissinger, the Harvard professor of political science who had started his career as an unofficial diplomat involved in the peace efforts to end the Vietnam War, met Herbert Marcovich, a French biologist, who told him that his friend Raymond Aubrac was a friend of Ho Chi Minh. Kissinger contacted Ambassador Harriman with a mandate to end the war. Marcovich and Aubrac agreed to fly to Hanoi to meet Ho and to convey his messages to Kissinger, who was to pass them on to Harriman. Though nothing came of the scheme, called "Operation Pennsylvania", as Ho demanded that the United States must "unconditionally" stop bombing North Vietnam as a precondition for peace talks, a demand that Johnson rejected, it established Kissinger as someone who was interested in making peace in Vietnam. Kissinger had served as the principal foreign policy adviser for New York governor Nelson Rockefeller during his three failed bids to win the Republican presidential nomination in 1960, 1964 and 1968. In the 1968 Republican primaries, Kissinger had expressed considerable contempt for Nixon, of whom he wrote in July 1968 was "the most dangerous, of all the men running, to have as president." After Rockefeller lost to Nixon, Kissinger switched camps, telling Nixon's campaign manager John N. Mitchell that he had changed his mind about Nixon. As Kissinger was a close associate of Rockefeller with a history of denigrating Nixon, Mitchell was very cool to Kissinger. In an attempt to ingratiate himself with Nixon, Kissinger offered to serve as a spy, saying that Harriman trusted him and he could keep Nixon informed about the state of the Paris peace talks.

On September 17, 1968, Kissinger contacted Harriman but falsely portrayed himself as having broken with the Republicans, writing a letter that began with: "My dear Averell, I am through with Republican politics. The party is hopeless and unfit to govern." Kissinger visited Harriman in Paris to offer his expertise and advice, and, through talking with Harriman's staff, learned that the peace talks were going well. Upon returning to the United States from France, Kissinger contacted Richard V. Allen, another Nixon adviser, to tell him that Harriman was making progress in Paris. Kissinger contacted Allen via payphone in an attempt to avoid FBI wiretapping.

Vice President Hubert Humphrey, the Democratic presidential candidate, was trailing in the polls following the riots at the Democratic Convention in Chicago in August. However, on September 30, 1968, he broke with Johnson by stating his willingness to stop all bombing of North Vietnam if he were to be elected. As a result, Humphrey began to rise in the polls, and by late October 1968, polls showed Humphrey with a 44%-43% lead over Nixon. In October, Harriman's delegation in Paris reported to Washington that peace talks with Ho were proceeding well and that the ambassador believed that a peace agreement could be possible before the election. On October 12, 1968, Kissinger reported to Allen that Harriman had "broken open the champagne" because he believed that he was very close to a peace deal. In a conversation that was secretly recorded by the FBI, Allen and Mitchell agreed that Kissinger would have to be rewarded with a senior post, such as national security adviser, if Nixon were to win the election.

Though a peace deal might have turned the election in favor of Humphrey, South Vietnamese president Nguyễn Văn Thiệu did not want the Paris peace talks to be successful. Throughout October, Thiệu did not want to consider the National Liberation Front of South Vietnam (NLF) as a government, leading to pressure from the Johnson Administration to cease his intransigence.

On October 23, Ambassador Diễm cabled President Thiệu to say that he was in close contact with Chennault and that: "Many Republican friends have contacted me and encouraged us to stand firm. They were alarmed by press reports to the effect that you have already softened your position." In another message, Diễm reported to Thiệu that Chennault wanted him to object to the American offer to cease bombing North Vietnam altogether, saying this would be a deal-breaker at the Paris peace talks. Chennault's messages to Thiệu also intimated that Nixon, if elected, would bargain for a better peace deal than would Humphrey, which encouraged Thiệu's sabotage of the peace negotiations. According to the notes, written during meetings by Nixon aide H.R. Haldeman's, the orders were: "Keep Anna Chennault working on SVN [South Vietnam]." Both the CIA and the FBI had tapped Chennault's phone and were recording her conversations with Diễm, and the NSA was intercepting South Vietnamese diplomatic cables. The CIA had also bugged Thiệu's office, and as a result knew that Chennault's messages were indeed encouraging Thiệu to make unreasonable demands at the Paris peace talks. Johnson phoned Nixon to tell him that he knew what he was doing and to stay away from Chennault. Johnson's call convinced Nixon that the FBI had bugged Nixon's phone, as Johnson seemed very well informed on the details. In fact, Chennault was under FBI surveillance. One FBI report stated: "Anna Chennault contacted Vietnam Ambassador Bùi Diễm and advised him that she received a message from her boss...which her boss wanted her to give personally to the ambassador. She said the message was that, 'Hold on. We are gonna win...Please tell your boss to hold on."

It was through Chennault's intercession that Republicans advised Saigon to refuse participation in the talks, promising a better deal once elected. Records of FBI wiretaps show that Chennault phoned Diễm on November 2 with the message "hold on, we are gonna win." Before the election, President Johnson "suspected (…) Richard Nixon, of political sabotage that he called treason."

On January 2, 2017, the New York Times reported that historian and Nixon biographer John A. Farrell had found a memo written by Haldeman that confirmed that Nixon had authorized "throwing a monkey wrench" into Johnson's peace negotiations. Thiệu's objections sabotaged the peace talks in Paris, and on October 30, 1968, Thiệu announced that South Vietnam was withdrawing from the peace negotiations. Thiệu publicly blamed the seating arrangements, claiming that it was unacceptable that the Viet Cong delegation should be seated apart from that of North Vietnam and stating that the entirety of the communist delegation should be seated together. The South Vietnamese peace delegation did not return to Paris until January 24, 1969.

William Bundy, Johnson's assistant secretary of state for Asian affairs, summoned Diễm to a meeting at which he accused him of "improper" and "unethical" contacts with Chennault. Johnson knew from FBI, CIA and NSA briefs of Chennault's efforts to sabotage the Paris peace talks, saying that the "bitch" was guilty of treason. He told his friend Everett Dirksen, the Republican minority leader in the Senate, "We could stop the killing out there. But they've got this...new formula put in there-namely wait on Nixon. And they're killing four or five hundred a day waiting on Nixon." On November 2, 1968, Johnson called Dirksen to say "I'm reading their hand. This is treason." Dirksen responded, "I know." As much of the information had been gathered illegally, such as through warrantless FBI phone tapping, Johnson felt that he could not have the Justice Department charge Chennault to the degree that he wished. To charge Chennault might also mean having to admit in court that the NSA was reading South Vietnam's diplomatic codes, which in turn could trouble relations with other American allies who may suspect that their cables were also being intercepted. Johnson's national security adviser Walt Whitman Rostow urged him to "blow the whistle" and "destroy" Nixon, but the president demurred, saying that it would cause too great a scandal if it emerged that the United States had spied on its close ally South Vietnam.

The presidential election was extremely close, with Nixon winning 43.4% of the popular vote and 301 electoral votes and Humphrey 42.7% of the popular vote and 191 electoral votes. Third-party candidate George Wallace received 13.5% of the popular vote. Given the extremely tight election, it was widely believed that Chennault's intervention may have been decisive, as a peace agreement might have tipped the election in favor of Humphrey.

In part because Nixon won the presidency, no one was prosecuted for this possible violation of the Logan Act. Former FBI deputy director Cartha "Deke" DeLoach mentioned in his book Hoover's FBI that his agency was only able to connect a single November 2, 1968, phone call from Nixon's running mate Spiro Agnew to Chennault, unrecorded details of which Johnson had believed were subsequently transmitted to Nixon. Later phone calls to Nixon aide John N. Mitchell were made using direct personal numbers that changed every several days, as was Mitchell's custom.

A week after the election and a joint Nixon-Johnson statement regarding Vietnam policy, Mitchell asked Chennault to intercede again, this time to persuade Saigon to join the talks, but she refused. By Chennault's account, when Nixon personally thanked her in 1969, she complained that she "had suffered dearly" for her efforts on his behalf, and he replied, "Yes, I appreciate that. I know you are a good soldier." American historian and Chennault biographer Catherine Forslund has argued that Chennault would have been in a good position to demand that Nixon appoint her ambassador to an important American ally or that she be given some other prestigious job as a reward, but Chennault declined, fearing that she might have to answer difficult questions during Senate confirmation hearings.

Chennault involvement with the Paris peace talks on behalf of Nixon is sometimes called the "Chennault Affair." William Bundy wrote that "probably no great chance was lost" for peace. John A. Farrell has argued that, given the incompatible agendas of Hanoi and Saigon, the chances for peace in the fall of 1968 were overrated. He also offers that there was at least a moment of hope for peace in Vietnam in 1968, and that Nixon's encouragement, via Chennault, of Thiệu's obstinance had ended that hope for purely partisan reasons, making it the "most reprehensible" of all of Nixon's actions. Assessments vary about the importance of Chennault's intervention in the 1968 election. American historian Jules Witcover wrote that because Nixon won the election by 0.7%, a peace agreement just before the election in October 1968 could have been decisive, as even a small boost in the polls for Humphrey might have made the difference. By contrast, Catherine Forslund, told the Wall Street Journal that Thiệu would have acted to sabotage the peace talks in October 1968 without any prompting from Chennault.

In 2024, historian David L. Prentice echoed Forslund's view, arguing in his November 2024 article for Diplomatic History that based on newly located Vietnamese sources, "U.S. politics was only one factor in Thiệu's decision to boycott the peace talks. He had been preparing to break from the United States long before the dashing Chennault arrived on the scene."

== Later life ==
In 1970, Chennault received appointments from President Nixon to his advisory committee for the John F. Kennedy Center for the Performing Arts and to the U.S. National Committee for UNESCO. She was president of Chinese Refugee Relief from 1962 to 1970 and served as president of the General Claire Chennault Foundation after 1960. She served as a Republican national committeewoman representing the District of Columbia and led the National Republican Asian Assembly. She encouraged many Chinese Americans to become active in politics, and in 1973, she helped found the Organization of Chinese Americans (OCA).

In October 1971, Chennault helped lead an unsuccessful effort to stop the United Nations General Assembly from expelling the Republic of China (Taiwan) and seating the People's Republic of China. In a speech, Chennault said "Let's hope the United Nations doesn't end up like the League of Nations...Its effectiveness is in grave doubt...Fortunately, the big events cannot be settled in the UN anyway." Chennault also said, "I consider this an anti-American vote and I question if the American people will continue to give...financial support to this world organization." Leading up to the 1972 presidential election, Chennault raised $90,000 (about $375,000 in today's money) for the Nixon reelection campaign.

After President Nixon visited China in 1972, there was a real possibility that the United States might finally recognize the People's Republic of China as the legitimate Chinese government, and in 1974 the U.S. opened an office in Beijing that acted as a de facto embassy. On April 21, 1975, as South Vietnam crumbled, President Thiệu resigned and fled to Taiwan. Shortly after Thiệu arrived there, Chennault visited him to tell him that President Gerald Ford was willing to grant asylum to his family, but not to him, as he was too controversial to be allowed to live in the U.S. Thiệu told her: "It is so easy to be an enemy of the United States, but so difficult to be a friend."

Throughout the 1970s, Chennault lobbied against American recognition of the People's Republic of China, and in 1977 she joined 80 prominent Chinese-Americans in signing a public letter to President Jimmy Carter drawing attention to China's poor human-rights record and asking that the U.S. not establish diplomatic relations with Beijing. However, Carter officially recognized the People's Republic of China in 1979. Believing that the U.S. had betrayed South Vietnam by withdrawing in 1973 and allowing North Vietnam to conquer the South in 1975, Chennault lobbied Congress to admit Vietnamese refugees fleeing the communist regime.

In the 1980 presidential election, Chennault raised $675,000 (about $1.41 million in today's money) for the Republicans.

In January 1981, Chennault visited Beijing to meet Chinese leader Deng Xiaoping, ostensibly as a private citizen, but in fact as an unofficial diplomat representing incoming Republican president Ronald Reagan, who was due to be sworn in as president on January 20. Reagan had been strongly critical of China, but as president, he wanted to focus on the struggle against the Soviet Union, which he had dubbed the "evil empire", and wanted China as a de facto American ally against Moscow. Chennault conveyed this message to Deng and told him that Reagan's denunciations of the evils of communism applied only to Soviet communism, not to Chinese communism.

As Chennault was a long-time Republican and a doyenne of the China Lobby, her meeting with Deng attracted much media attention in the United States. Chennault stated that Deng had complained to her that none of the American "China Hands" were huaren (overseas Chinese), asking "Why do all the so-called China experts have blue eyes and blond hair?" During her visit to China, Chennault also met her relative, the communist politician Liao Chengzhi. Chennault told The Washington Post that she and Liao had "talked about the Cultural Revolution and the Gang of Four and how they had lost an entire generation. They told of their need for administrators and technicians to run the country and how they are having to reeducate the people in the new technology because when the Russians left China they took everything with them. Now the Chinese realize it was wrong to copy the Russians." After her visit to Beijing, Chennault visited Taipei to meet President Chiang Ching-kuo, the son of Chiang Kai-shek, to brief him on what she had seen in the People's Republic of China. Chiang was displeased, fearing that Reagan might not break relations with the People's Republic and once again recognize the Republic of China as the legitimate government of China, but he told her that he was pleased that it was she who had made that trip, as he knew that she was a friend of the Kuomintang. Chiang cautiously distanced himself from the policies of his father, saying that it was time for new thinking about relations across the Taiwan straits and that the People's Republic of China under Deng was moving away from the policies that it had pursued under Mao.

In 1984, Chennault led a trade mission to China that was intended to facilitate U.S.-China trade following Deng's reforms in the 1980s that opened up China's economy. As someone closely linked to the Kuomintang, Chennault served not only as a consultant on American-Chinese trade but also on trade between Taiwan and China. Despite the longstanding hostility between the Chinese Communist Party and the Kuomintang, in the 1980s Taiwanese companies began to invest in the mainland, bringing much-needed capital and skills. It was the hope of both Deng and Chennault that economic integration between Taiwan and China might lead to reunification, but political reforms in Taiwan during the 1980s led to its evolution into a democracy. Though the majority of the Taiwanese are ethnic Chinese, a sense of Taiwanese nationalism had emerged by the 1980s, and many Taiwanese had no desire to be reunited with China under any conditions, which meant that economic integration did not lead to political integration as was hoped. Chennault was attacked in the Taiwanese media in 1989 for her statement that she was in favor of "separating economics from politics", which led the pro-Kuomintang newspaper China Times to condemn her in an editorial for letting "personal financial considerations" influence her political views.

After the Tiananmen Square protests of 1989, when the People's Liberation Army shot down protesting university students demanding democracy, the U.S. publicly pulled away from China. At the request of the American government, Chennault passed a message to Deng saying that Washington still wanted a good relationship with Beijing, that the sanctions imposed on China were only to appease American public opinion and that the sanctions would be ended in the near future. To further press the point, on June 30, 1989, the national security adviser Brent Scowcroft secretly visited Beijing to tell Deng that "President Bush recognizes the value of the PRC-US relationship to the vital interests of both countries" and that the U.S. viewed the Tiananmen Square massacre as an "internal affair." Despite the controversy, in December 1989 and again in March 1990, Chennault led delegations of Taiwanese businessmen to China to "study the investment climate on the mainland." She stated that people must be "humble enough to learn, courageous enough to change their positions."

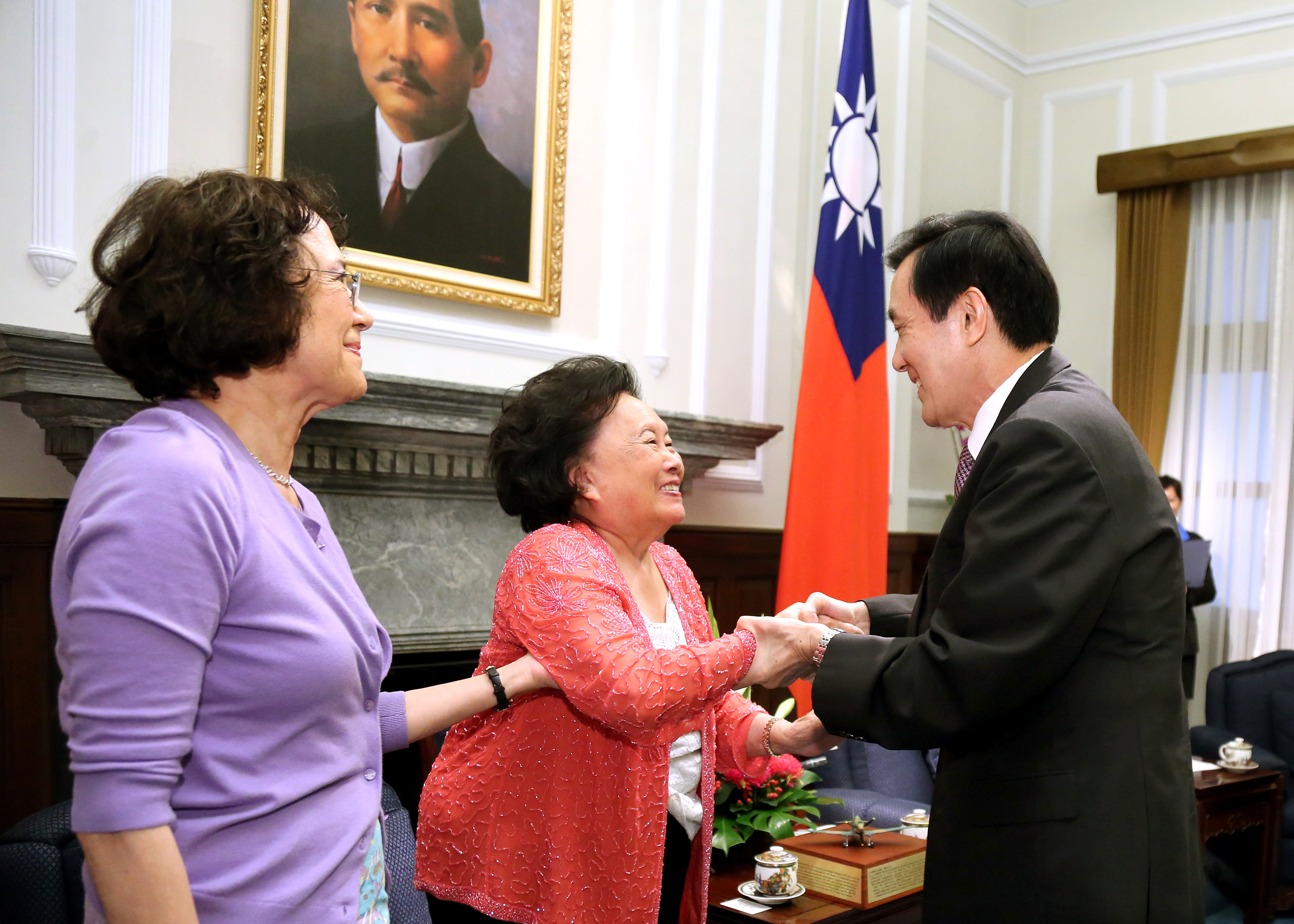
Anna Chennault meeting with Republic of China President Ma Ying-jeou in 2015

Chennault died on March 30, 2018, in Washington, D.C. at the age of 94. Some news stories gave her age at death as 92, based on June 23, 1925, as her generally reported date of birth, but she was actually born in 1923. She is buried next to her husband at Arlington National Cemetery.

== Bibliography ==
- John Farrell (2017). Nixon The Life (2017 ed.). New York, NY: Doubleday. ISBN 978-0-385-53735-3.
- Catherine Forslund (2002). Anna Chennault: Informal Diplomacy and Asian Relations (2002 ed.). New York, NY: Rowman & Littlefield. ISBN 0-8420-2833-1.
- A.J. Lannguth (2002-03-12). Our Vietnam: The War 1954-1975 (2000 ed.). New York, NY: Simon & Schuster. ISBN 0743212312.
- Charlotte Power (2001). Spencher Tucker (ed.). "Chennault, Anna". The Encyclopedia of the Vietnam War (2000 ed.). Oxford: Oxford University Press. ISBN 0-19-513525-3.
- Hyung-chan Kim, chief editor. Distinguished Asian Americans, A Biographical Dictionary, Greenwood Press (1999)
- Anna Chennault. Chennault and the Flying Tigers: Way of a Fighter (January 1, 1963 ed.). New York, NY Paul S. Eriksson, Inc. B001YUDCZA.
- Anna Chennault (1962). A Thousand Springs: The Biography of a Marriage (January 1, 1962 ed.). New York, NY Paul S. Eriksson, Inc. B000JD0KCQ.
- Anna Chennault (1980). The Education of Anna (1980 ed.). Times Books; Second Printing edition. pp. 242. ISBN 0-8129-0844-9.
- Anna Chennault. Song of Yesterday (1961) in Chinese
- Anna Chennault. M.E.E. (1963) in Chinese
- Anna Chennault. My Two Worlds (1965) in Chinese
- Anna Chennault. The Other Half (1966) in Chinese
- Anna Chennault. Letters from the U.S.A. (1967)
- Anna Chennault. Journey among Friends and Strangers (1978, Chinese edition)

== Memberships ==
- 14th Air Force Association
- Theta Sigma Phi
- National Military Family Association, founder and chairperson
- Committee of 100
