= Ambassy Club =

Coordinates: 31.2089°N 121.4455°E

The Ambassy Club was the first private club established in Shanghai since the founding of the People's Republic of China. It is located on Central Huaihai Road across from the United States Consulate, the Consulate of Iran, and near the Shanghai Library.

Although it has many local members, the Ambassy Club has a large number of American and European members. The managers are required to know English.

The club has several restaurants, each offering a different type of cuisine. There are two upscale restaurants. One offers Japanese cuisine prepared and served in traditional methods. The other offers gourmet Chinese cuisine. There is also a café-type restaurant, which serves American and European style food, as well as snacks, desserts, pastries, and coffee. The club also has a unique "piano" bar, which has an exclusive, jazz-club feel. There is live music nightly, plus a selection of some of the finest liquors and cigars available in China.

The club has both an indoor and an outdoor pool. The outdoor pool has a unique waterslide, and a deck for sunbathing. A rock-climbing wall, basketball court, and children's playground are also located on the grounds.

Located within The Ambassy Club is Ambassy Court, a condominium complex of three medium height buildings, and underground parking. Owners of condominiums also have membership at the club, and access to the club's "guest house," where out of town guests can stay in hotel-like accommodations (complete with housekeeping) on the grounds of the club. The name Ambassy Club comes from an alternate spelling of Embassy, and refers to the proximity of the club to the U.S., French and Iranian Consulates. The Chinese name for the club is Hong Yi.

A new Ambassy Club, with similar offerings, opened in Beijing in the fall of 2006.

The club's board members include the following:

- Vincent Lo, the Hong Kong business man who developed Xintiandi.
- Maurice Fung, a former Minnesota restaurant owner, who moved to China to become the general manager of Ambassy Club, Shanghai City Center, and a major property developer in Shanghai, Beijing, and various other upcoming cities throughout China.
- Peter Neumann, shareholder in the Shanghai office of Greenberg Traurig LLP.
- Stanley Ho, the 84th richest man in the world in 2006, according to Forbes, and owner of eight Macau casinos.
- Nora Sun, granddaughter of Sun Yat-sen, and noted Shanghai socialite.
- J. Norwell Coquillard, President of Cargill Investment (China) Ltd.

Prior to her death in April 2007, Nina Wang was also a member of the Board. She was the "Chairlady" of Chinachem Group, and the richest woman in Asia, with an estimated net worth of almost $4 billion.
