= William M. Leary =

American academic and aviation historian

William Matthew "Bill" Leary, Jr. (May 6, 1934 — February 24, 2006) was an American academic and aviation historian. For 32 years, Leary taught at the University of Georgia from which he retired as the E. Merton Coulter Professor of History in 2005.

Leary was born in Newark, New Jersey in 1934. He joined the United States Air Force and was stationed at Kadena Air Base in Japan during the Korean War where his responsibilities included filing flight plans, logging arrivals and departures, and arranging parking and service for aircraft. Leary stated that his observation of Civil Air Transport aircraft and personnel at Kadena led to a historical interest in aviation.

After the war, Leary earned a doctorate in American history from Princeton University. He taught at Princeton, San Diego State University, University of Victoria, and finally the University of Georgia. Leary earned four Fulbright grants and in 1995 earned the Central Intelligence Agency's Studies in Intelligence Award. From 1996 to 1997, Leary held the Charles A. Lindbergh Chair in Aerospace History at the National Air and Space Museum.

During his career, Leary authored books on various books on the history of aviation, including different airlines and the commercial airline industry. He documented the history of the China National Aviation Corporation, Civil Air Transport, and Air America, and their links to the United States Intelligence Community, in a trilogy of books: The Dragon's Wings: the Story of the China National Aviation Corporation, Perilous Missions: Civil Air Transport and CIA Covert Operations in Asia, a history of Civil Air Transport, and a third unfinished, unpublished book about Air America. Other books written by Leary discussed Mohawk Airlines, Project COLDFEET, and Allen Dulles. Other subjects covered in his writings included the Airmails of the United States, Bernt Balchen and polar aviation, the USAF's Combat Cargo Command, and the aerial resupply of Yugoslav Partisans during World War II.

On February 24, 2006, Leary died in Watkinsville, Georgia.

== Selected works ==
- Leary, William M. We Shall Return! MacArthur's Commanders and the Defeat of Japan, 1942–1945. Lexington, KY: University Press of Kentucky, 1988. ISBN 0813116546
- Leary, William M., and Leonard A. LeSchack. Project COLDFEET: Secret Mission to a Soviet Ice Station. Annapolis, MD: Naval Institute Press, 1996. ISBN 1557505144
- Leary, William M. Anything, Anywhere, Any Time: Combat Cargo in the Korean War. Washington, D.C.: Air Force History and Museums Program, 2000. ISBN 0160503736
- Leary, William M. Perilous Missions: Civil Air Transport and the CIA Covert Operations in Asia. Washington, D.C.: Smithsonian Institution Press, 2002. ISBN 1588340287
