= Civil Air Transport =

1946–1968 CIA-owned airline of the Republic of China used for covert operations

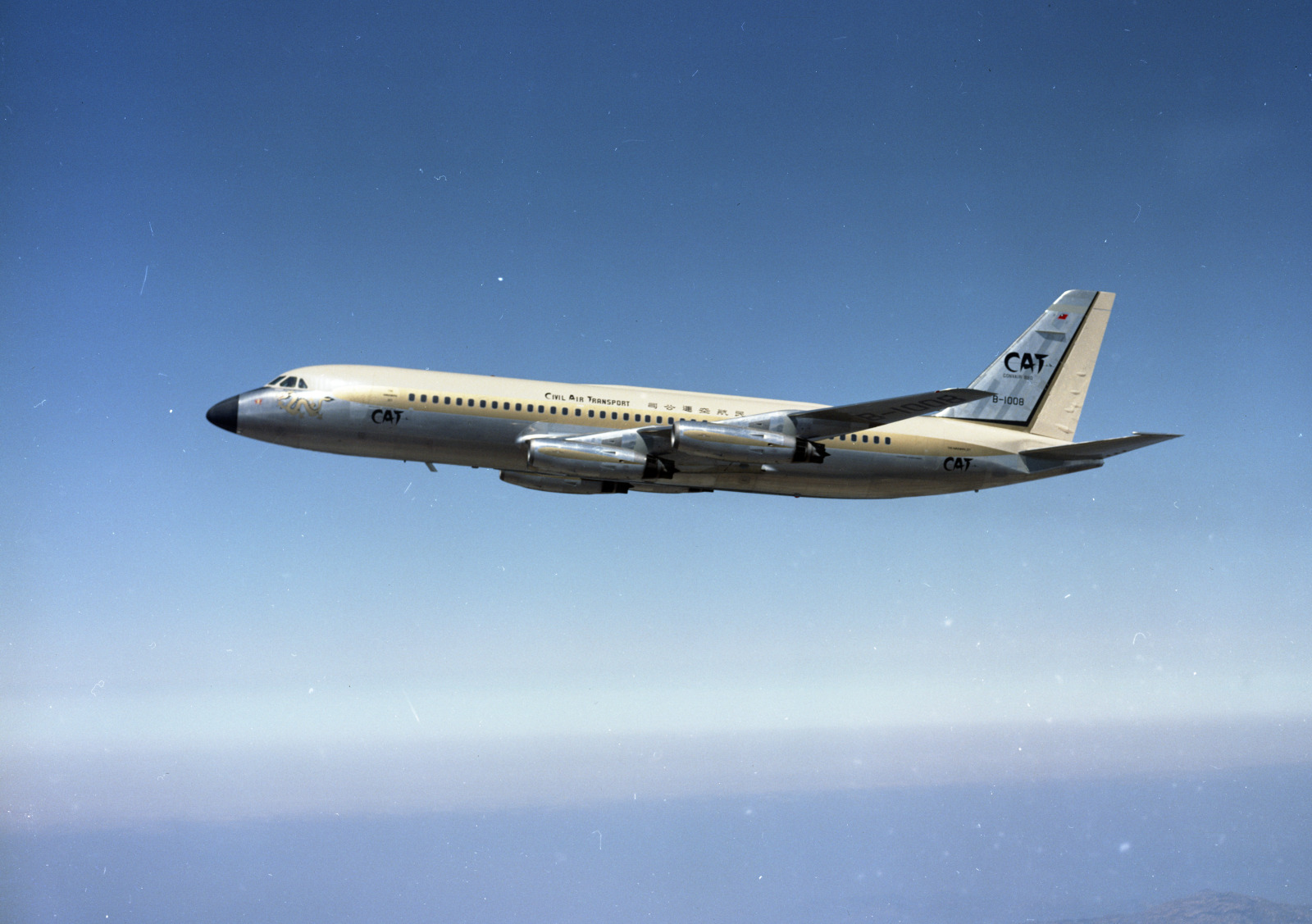
- Convair 880 pre delivery photo
IATA	ICAO	Call sign
CT^{(1)}	CT^{(1)}	CAT
- Commenced operations: 1946
- Ceased operations: 16 February 1968
- Fleet size: See Fleet below
- Destinations: See Destinations below
- Parent company: CAT, Inc.
- Headquarters: Taipei, Taiwan
- Founders: Claire Chennault; Whiting Willauer

Notes
- (1) IATA, ICAO codes were the same until the 1980s

Civil Air Transport
- Traditional Chinese: 民航空運公司
- Simplified Chinese: 民航空运公司
Transcriptions
Standard Mandarin
- Hanyu Pinyin: Mínháng Kōngyùn Gōngsī

Civil Air Transport (CAT) was a Nationalist Chinese airline, later owned by the U.S. Central Intelligence Agency (CIA), that supported the United States' covert operations throughout East and Southeast Asia. During the Cold War, missions consisted in assistance to "Free World" allies according to the Mutual Defense Assistance Act of 1949. The CIA-owned airline Air America, which primarily operated in Southeast Asia (particularly in Laos and Vietnam), was a spin-off of CAT, as was the CIA's Taiwan-based aviation maintenance facility, Air Asia.

== Origins ==
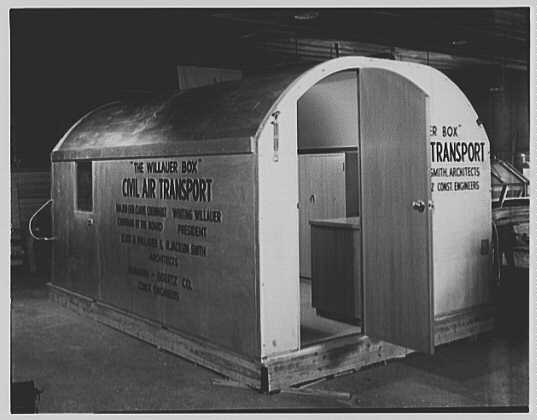
The Willauer Box

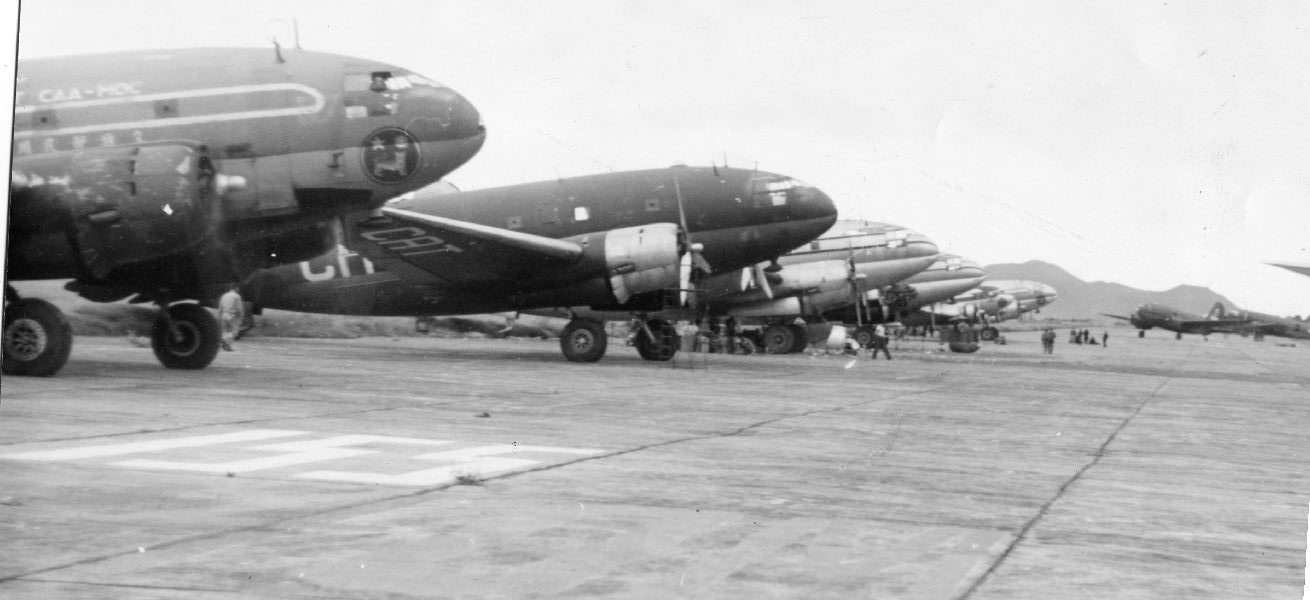
CAT Curtiss C-46s at Sanya Air Base on Hainan Island evacuated from Mainland China November 1949

CAT was created by Claire Chennault and Whiting Willauer in 1946 as Chinese National Relief and Rehabilitation Administration (CNRRA) Air Transport. Using surplus World War II aircraft such as the C-47 Dakota and the C-46 Commando, CAT airlifted supplies and food into war-ravaged China. It was soon pressed into service to support Chiang Kai-shek and his Kuomintang forces in the civil war between them and the communists under Mao Zedong. Many of its first pilots were veterans of Chennault's World War II combat groups, popularly known as Flying Tigers. (Other of Chennault's veterans went on to form another air transport company, the Flying Tiger Line. This was a completely separate operation from Civil Air Transport and the follow-on Air America.)

By 1950, following the defeat of Chiang's forces and their retreat to Taiwan, the airline faced financial difficulties. The CIA formed a private Delaware corporation called Airdale Corporation, which formed a subsidiary called CAT, Inc. The subsidiary corporation purchased nominal shares of Civil Air Transport. CAT maintained a civilian appearance by flying scheduled passenger flights while simultaneously using other aircraft in its fleet to fly covert missions.

With the spread of communism throughout Southeast Asia, CAT's mission changed.

== Military operations ==
=== Chinese Civil War ===
During the Chinese Civil War, under contract with the Chinese Nationalist government and later the CIA, CAT flew supplies and ammunition into China to assist Kuomintang forces in mainland China, primarily using C-47 and C-46 aircraft. With the defeat of the Kuomintang in 1949, CAT helped to evacuate thousands of Chinese to Taiwan.

=== Korean War ===
During the Korean War, CAT airlifted thousands of tons of war materials to supply United States military operations, including support of Kuomintang holdouts based in Burma (Operation PAPER). On 29 November 1952, a CAT C-47 left Seoul on a mission to collect an anti-Communist Chinese agent in the foothills of northeastern China, using a "pole and line" technique. The mission was apparently compromised and Chinese forces were waiting for them. Approaching low over the ground, it was attacked by small-arms fire, and crash-landed near the town of Antu in China's Jilin province. The pilots, Robert Snoddy and Norman Schwartz were killed during the crash and subsequent fire, and were buried nearby. The two CIA officers, John T. Downey and Richard G. Fecteau survived and were immediately taken prisoner by Chinese forces, who were waiting for the flight. Downey and Fecteau were held by China and regularly interrogated for nearly twenty years. Fecteau was released unexpectedly following Nixon's visit to China in 1972, but Downey was released only after Washington publicly acknowledged their spy mission in 1973.

At the time the families of the pilots were told, in order to keep the CIA's covert actions in China secret, that they had crashed into the Sea of Japan on a routine flight to Tokyo. In 2001, China allowed the US Defense Department's Prisoner of War and Missing in Action (POW/MIA) office to conduct a recovery effort for the bodies of the pilots. In 2005 the POW/MIA office announced that it had identified the remains of Robert Snoddy using DNA analysis. Schwartz's remains have not been recovered.

The 1952–1953 edition of Jane's All The World's Aircraft lists the head office address as Suite 309, Kass Building, 711 14th Street, N.W., Washington, D.C., with the footnote that the company had reregistered in the U.S. The president is given as Whiting Willauer, and the fleet listed as 23 Curtiss C-46 Commando and 4 Douglas DC-3 aircraft.

=== First Indochina War ===
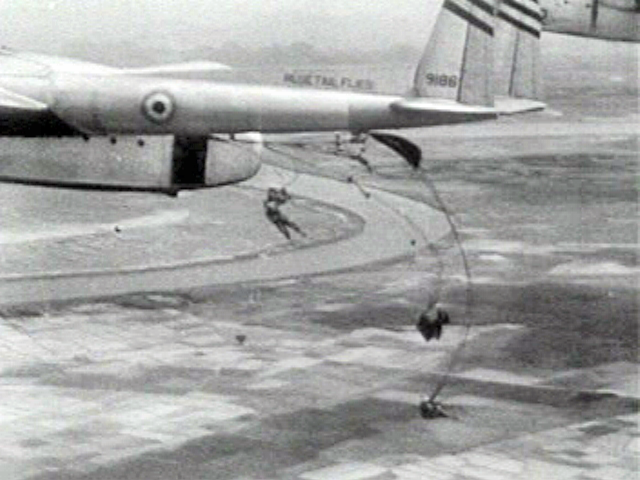
CAT pilots flying C-119 during the siege of Dien Bien Phu in May 1954

On May 1, 1953, Operation Squaw began, calling for CAT to airdrop supplies to French troops besieged at Na Sam, Laos. This operation was the first U.S. involvement in what became the First Indochina War. CAT transported supplies and troops for French operations during Operation Castor in November 1953.

CAT assisted the French government at various times during its Indochina wars, flying supplies and equipment into Hanoi's Gia Lam airport and other fields using C-46 and C-47 transport planes.

Operation Squaw-II was approved on January 29, 1954, and, after negotiations with the French, a contract was signed on March 3 for CAT to supply 24 pilots to operate 12 C-119s. At the Battle of Dien Bien Phu, CAT supplied the French garrison by parachuting troops and supplies with covert USAF C-119 inscribed with French Air Force insignia. Two CAT pilots James B. McGovern Jr. and Wallace Buford were killed in action during the siege of Dien Bien Phu in May 1954. They were the first American casualties of what was later termed the Vietnam War. McGovern's remains were recovered in 2002 and identified in 2006. Seven surviving CAT pilots out of the thirty-seven involved in the battle received the French Legion of Honor in February 2005 during a special ceremony at the French embassy in Washington.

The 1956–1957 edition of Jane's All The World's Aircraft lists the head office address as 46 Chung Shan Road, North, 2nd Section, Taipei, Taiwan (Formosa). The president and general manager is given as Hugh L. Grundy, with C.J. Rosbert listed as vice-president and assistant general manager. The fleet is listed as 2 Douglas DC-4, 22 Curtiss Commando, 2 Douglas DC-3, 3 Douglas C-47, and 2 Convair Catalina.

In the 1958–1959 edition of Jane's, the last year in which the "Airlines of the World" section was carried, the home office address in Taiwan remained the same, but no company officers are listed. The fleet is given as 3 Douglas DC-4, 25 Curtiss C-46, 5 Douglas DC-3, 2 Convair Catalina, with 2 Douglas DC-6B on order.

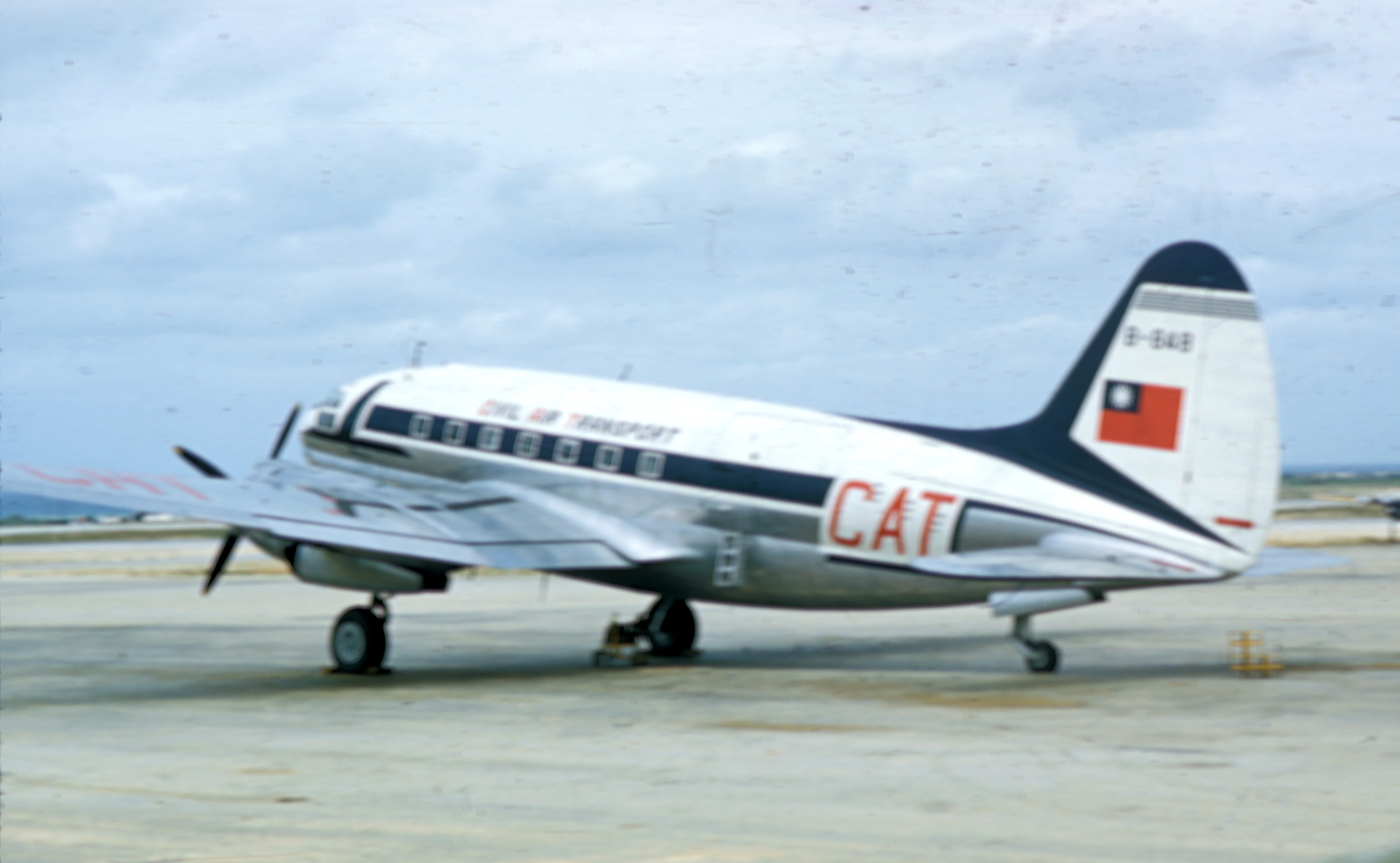
A CAT C-46D in Indochina

=== PRRI/Permesta movement in Indonesia ===
In 1958 Time reported that 20 CAT aircraft were supplying the PRRI/Permesta movement against President Sukarno's government of Indonesia, which the Eisenhower administration feared had communist sympathies. In April 1958 two CAT pilots flew combat missions for Permesta's Angkatan Udara Revolusioner ("Revolutionary Air Force") or AUREV. William H. Beale and Allen Pope flew CIA Douglas B-26 Invaders for AUREV. In May, Beale withdrew from the operation, by which time a third CAT pilot, Connie W Seigrist, had joined flying a CIA Consolidated PBY Catalina. The CIA directed Beale and Pope to target not only Indonesian armed forces but also unarmed foreign merchant ships, in order to frighten overseas trade away from Indonesian waters, thereby weakening the Indonesian economy and undermining Sukarno's government. On April 28, 1958, Beale attacked the Royal Dutch Shell terminal at Balikpapan in East Kalimantan, sinking the British tanker MV San Flaviano, while Pope off the port of Donggala near Palu in Central Sulawesi sank merchant ships from Greece, Italy and Panama.

On May 18 west of Ambon Island, Pope attacked one of a pair of Indonesian merchant ships that were carrying government troops for a counter-offensive against Permesta. An Indonesian Air Force P-51 and anti-aircraft fire from the ships shot down the B-26, and Pope and his Indonesian radio operator were captured. The CIA had ordered the CAT pilots to fly "sterile", i.e. with no documents that could either identify them or link them with the US government. However, Pope was carrying about 30 documents including his detailed flight log, secret orders for temporary deployment in Indonesia, military separation file and CAT identity card. Pope's capture with these documents immediately exposed the level of CIA support for the Permesta rebellion. Embarrassed, the Eisenhower administration quickly ended CIA support for Permesta and withdrew its agents and remaining aircraft from AUREV.

Early in 1960 an Indonesian military court tried Pope; in April it convicted him and sentenced him to death. However, in 1962 Robert F. Kennedy negotiated with President Sukarno, and in August that year the Indonesian authorities released Pope and returned him to the US.

=== Vietnam War ===
In 1959, CAT was reorganized as Air America, which supported covert operations throughout Indochina during the Vietnam War (also known as the "Second Indochina War"), particularly in Laos. For further information see Air America (airline) § Early history: Civil Air Transport (CAT). Also relevant was Air Asia, a large CIA-owned Taiwan-based aviation maintenance facility, also spun out of CAT in the 1950s.

=== Post Vietnam War ===
After pulling out of South Vietnam in 1975, there was an attempt to keep a company presence in Thailand. After this fell through, Air America officially disbanded on June 30, 1976.

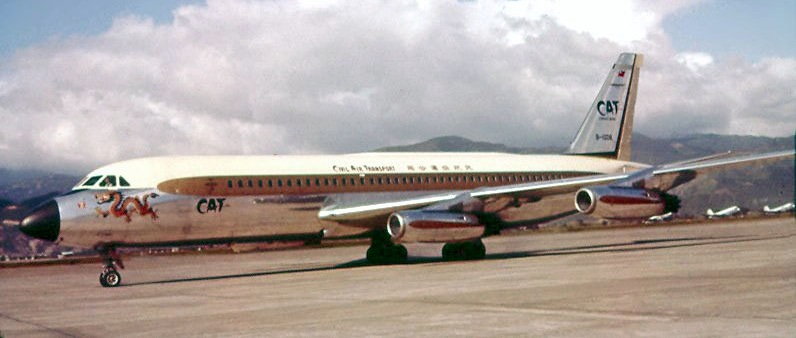
Convair 880 at Taipei 1966

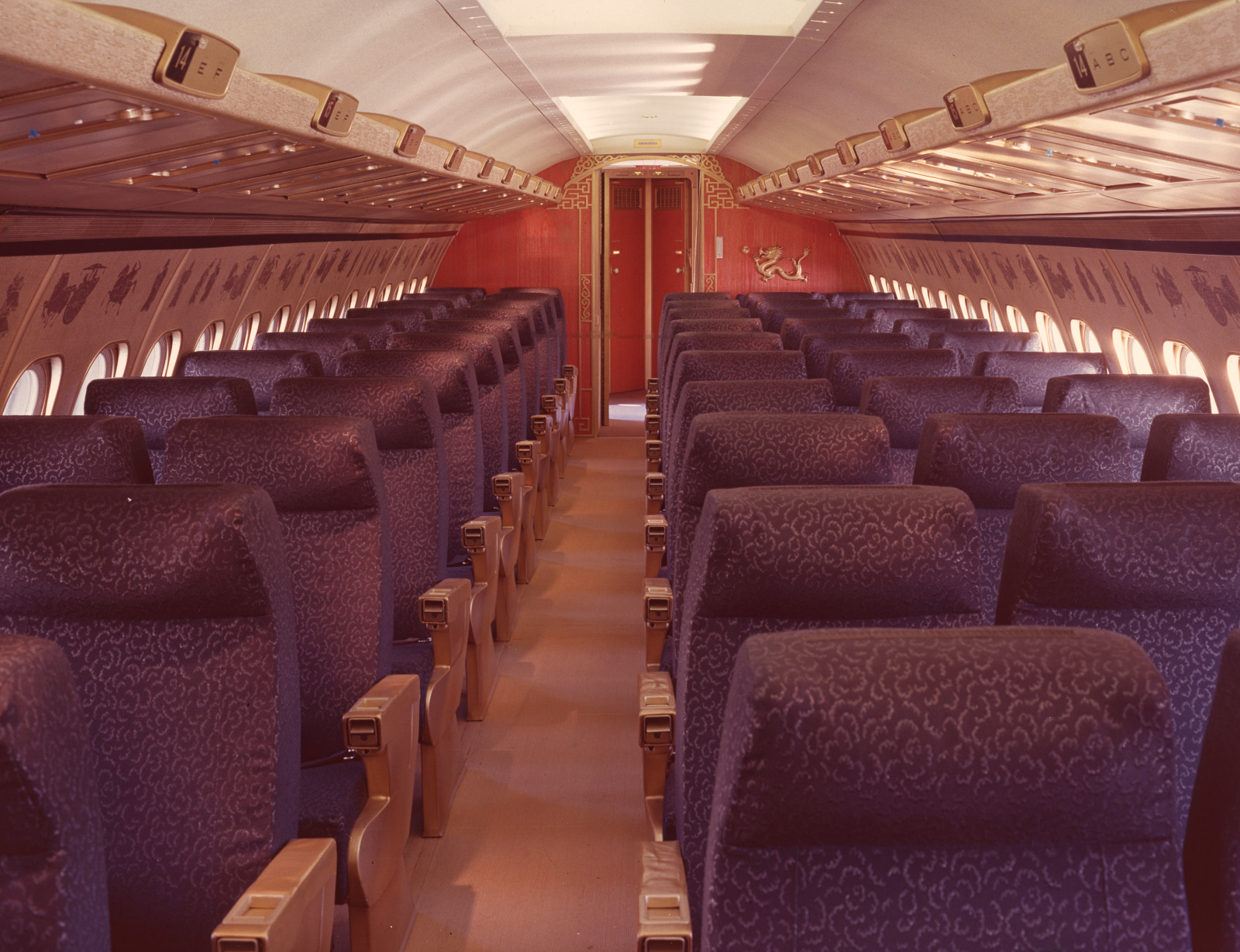
Convair 880 Interior

== Civil operations ==
CAT started to operate scheduled passenger services, beginning with international flights to Hong Kong, then to Japan, South Korea, the Philippines and Thailand, as well as domestic routes within Taiwan. The granddaughter of Sun Yatsen, Nora Sun, became the youngest flight attendant to work for CAT.

The first flights were carried out with C-46, then C-54 Skymaster aircraft. In 1958, CAT inaugurated DC-6B services. In 1961, CAT started to operate a Convair 880M, becoming the first airline to operate pure jet scheduled passenger services on regional routes in the Far East. Transition of civil services to China Airlines was already underway; in 1967 China Airlines started 727 service of its own to Tokyo and Hong Kong. CAT's Convair 880M was replaced by a Boeing 727 in January 1968. On 16 February 1968 the 727, flying from Hong Kong to Taipei, crashed near Linkou in northern Taiwan. This brought the transition plan forward, with CAT ending service and China Airlines taking over CAT's services to Seoul and Manila.

== Accidents and incidents ==
- 17 October 1947: A Douglas DC-3 crashed near Hopei AFB (30 mi SW of Baoding), killing the three crew. The aircraft was operating a Shijiazhuang-Peiping cargo flight and was loaded with cotton.
- 29 July 1948: Curtiss C-46D XT-822 crashed at Qingdao Airport after reportedly entering a spin at 100 m (330 ft) after takeoff, killing all 19 on board.
- 8 November 1949: Douglas C-47B XT-805 crashed 75 mi from Mengzi while en route to Haiphong, Vietnam.
- 9 December 1949: Curtiss C-46D XT-820 struck a mountain near Lanzhou en route from Beijing, killing all 38 on board.
- 10 December 1949: Curtiss C-46D XT-814 crashed at Haikou while on an evacuation flight from Chengdu to Haikou during the Chinese Civil War, killing 17 of 40 on board. Chengdu was under siege at the time.
- 8 December 1950: Curtiss C-46 XT-44 crashed on landing at Yonpo Airfield, North Korea, killing a passenger.
- 9 December 1950: Curtiss C-46F XT-852 struck the side of Mount Fuji at 8000 feet while en route to Korea, killing the three crew.
- 29 November 1952: A Douglas C-47 was shot down and crashed in Jilin Province, killing two of four crew on board. The aircraft was on a mission to pick up a secret agent in China.
- 6 May 1954: Fairchild C-119C 149 (ex 49–0149) crashed near Ban Sot, Laos, killing five of six crew, including pilot John P. McGovern and co-pilot Wallace A. Buford, the first American combat casualties in Vietnam. The aircraft was delivering an artillery piece to French troops at Dien Bien Phu when it was struck by Vietminh ground fire; one engine was lost to flak. The pilot managed to fly the aircraft 75 miles south into Laos and radioed another C-119 pilot for help in finding level ground. The crippled C-119 could hold out no longer, and it cartwheeled and crashed into a hillside near the Sang Ma River in Houaphanh Province. McGovern's remains were located in 2002 and identified in 2006.
- 20 October 1954: Douglas C-47A B-811 crashed in the Gulf of Siam off Hua Hin, Thailand, killing six of seven on board. The aircraft, chartered by Sea Supply (a CIA operation) was practicing paratroop drops when a wingtip dipped.
- 20 June 1964: Flight 106, a Curtiss C-46, crashed near the village of Shengang in Taichung City, killing all 57 people aboard. Among the dead were 20 Americans, one Briton and members of the Malaysian delegation to the 11th Film Festival in Asia, including businessman Loke Wan Tho and his wife Mavis. The pilot lost control while turning to return to the airport following a problem with the number one engine.
- 16 February 1968: Flight 010, a Boeing 727-92C (B-1018), flew from Hong Kong to Taipei. Coming in to land at Taipei Songshan Airport, the plane failed to capture an ILS signal from the airport, and crashed near Linkou, killing 21 out of 52 passengers and crew, and one person on the ground.

== Fleet ==
- Curtiss C-46 Commando
- Boeing B-17G Fortress
- Douglas C-47 Skytrain
- Douglas DC-4
- Douglas DC-6
- Convair 880
- Boeing 727

== Destinations ==
5 April 1953:

- Bangkok
- Hong Kong
- Iwakuni, Japan
- Manila
- Okinawa
- Pusan, Korea
- Taipei
- Tokyo

17 April 1967:

- Bangkok
- Hong Kong
- Manila
- Okinawa
- Osaka
- Seoul
- Taipei
- Tokyo

== See also ==
- Pacific Corporation
- Air America
- Air Asia
- Southern Air Transport
- Intermountain Aviation
- Evergreen International Airlines

== Sources ==
- Conboy, Kenneth; Morrison, James (1999). Feet to the Fire CIA Covert Operations in Indonesia, 1957–1958. Annapolis: Naval Institute Press. ISBN 1-55750-193-9.
- Leary, W.M. (2006). Perilous Missions: Civil Air Transport and CIA Covert Operations in Asia. University of Alabama Press. ISBN 978-0-8173-5340-7.
