= Nora Sun =

Chinese-American diplomat and businesswoman

Nora Sun (Sun Sui-fen)
- 孫穗芬
- Born: Eleanora Caroline Sun; August 6, 1937; Shanghai, Republic of China
- Died: January 29, 2011 (aged 73); Taipei, Taiwan
- Education: University of Arizona
- Spouse: Capt. C.W. "Connie" Seigrist (孫康威) (divorced)
- Children: Steven Sun Seigrist (孫忠仁); Jeffrey Lloyd Seigrist (孫忠傑); Alan Daniel Seigrist (孫忠偉)
- Parent(s): Sun Fo and Rosa Lam

Chinese name
- Traditional Chinese: 孫穗芬
Transcriptions
Standard Mandarin
- Hanyu Pinyin: Sūn Suìfēn

Nora Sun (Chinese: 孫穗芬; August 6, 1937 – January 29, 2011) was a Chinese-American diplomat, businesswoman, and daughter of Sun Fo with Shanghai property developer Rosa Lam/Lan Yi, and granddaughter of Republic of China founder Sun Yat-sen. She was the founder of the Hong Kong–based Nora Sun Associates and a longtime resident of Shanghai, San Francisco, and Hong Kong. Chinese-American entrepreneur Yue-Sai Kan called Sun a "Sino-US trade matchmaker".

== Timeline ==
- 1938: Born in Shanghai, China to Sun Fo and Shanghai property developer and socialite Rosa Lam (Lan Ni in Mandarin).
- 1946: Kidnapped in Shanghai. After her mother Lan Ni paid the kidnappers' ransom, she and her mother fled to Hong Kong when Mao's troops seized the family's villa.
- 1955: After graduating from High School, she became the youngest flight attendant to work for Taiwan based Civil Air Transport airline.
- 1957: Married American pilot and World War II Veteran in Taiwan. She followed her husband to Thailand, Japan, and Jordan.
- 1978: Received her Bachelor of Science Degree in Finance from the University of Arizona. She later completed graduate studies at Babson College.
- 1986: Served as Chief Commercial Consul at the United States Consulate General in Guangzhou, China.
- 1989: Served as Chief Commercial Consul at the United States Consulate General in Shanghai, China.
- 1992: Served as Senior Commercial Counsul at the U.S. Embassy, Paris.
- 1994: Resigned from the State Department and founded Nora Sun Associates Ltd.
- 2010: Visited Taipei, Taiwan in order to attend the Taipei International Flora Exposition. Sun was severely injured in a car accident on her way to Taoyuan International Airport on January 1, 2011. She died as a result of the injuries on January 29.

== Death ==
On January 1, 2011, Sun was involved in a traffic collision which caused her serious injury. She was traveling at Jianguo Overpass on the way to Taoyuan International Airport when the car she was riding was hit by another car coming from the opposite side of the highway. The accident injured her chest and abdomen. She was then treated at Shin Kong Wu Ho-Su Memorial Hospital but died on January 29, 2011.

== Book ==
- 沈飞德; Shen, Feide (2002). 民国第一家: 孙中山的亲属与后裔 [The first republican house: Sun Yat-sen's relatives and descendants]. Shanghai: Shanghai People's Press. ISBN 978-7208040489.

== See also ==
- Ambassy Club
