= Civil Air Transport Flight 10 =

1968 aviation accident

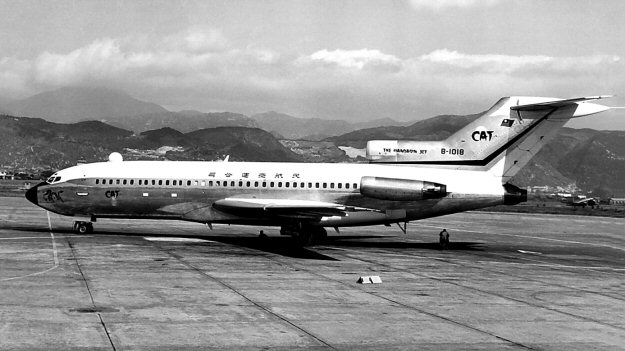
- B-1018, the aircraft involved in the accident

Accident
- Date: 16 February 1968
- Summary: Controlled flight into terrain due to pilot error
- Site: Hunan Village, Taipei County, Linkou Township (now Hunan, Linkou District, New Taipei City)
- Total fatalities: 22

Aircraft
- Aircraft type: Boeing 727-92C
- Aircraft name: Super Cuihua
- Operator: Civil Air Transport
- Registration: B-1018
- Flight origin: Kai Tak Airport, Hong Kong
- Destination: Songshan Airport, Taipei, Taiwan
- Passengers: 52
- Crew: 11
- Fatalities: 21
- Injuries: 42
- Survivors: 42

Ground casualties
- Ground fatalities: 1

Civil Air Transport Flight 10 was a scheduled passenger flight from the now-closed Kai Tak Airport in Hong Kong to Songshan Airport in Taipei, Taiwan. The flight, designated CT-010, was operated by a Boeing 727-92C registered as B-1018. On 16 February 1968, the aircraft crashed into Hunan village in Linkou Township, Taipei County (now Linkou District, New Taipei City), killing 21 people of the 64 people on board, as well as one person on the ground. Forty two people were injured.

== Accident ==
On the evening of 16 February 1968, B-1018 was operating a flight from Hong Kong to Taipei Songshan Airport under the command of Captain Stuart E. Dew, with Captain Hugh Hicks also present on the flight deck. Taipei's approach control cleared Flight 10 for an Instrument landing system (ILS) approach and subsequently transferred controlled to the tower. The aircraft’s heading and descent initially appeared normal, and weather conditions were clear, until Captain Hicks suddenly noticed that the aircraft's altitude had dropped below the prescribed glide path. He advanced the throttles in an attempt to initiate a go-around, but the aircraft struck a residential area and burst into flames.

Firefighters from Songshan Airport, assisted by and the U.S. military personnel from the nearby Shu Lin Kou Air Station, responded to the rescue. Ultimately, 21 passengers and crew members were killed, along with a local farmer on the ground.

== Investigation ==
The Civil Aeronautics Administration (CAA) released its final accident report on 4 March 1968. The investigation concluded that the accident was caused by pilot error during the ILS approach.

According to the International Civil Aviation Organization (ICAO) summary of the report, the aircraft was mechanically sound, and weather conditions were not a contributing factor. However, the seat of the pilot-in-command was occupied by a "senior pilot" who was not the designated captain for the flight. This pilot failed to maintain the proper approach altitude, allowing the aircraft to descend below the glide path. When the radio altimeter warning activated at approximately 350 feet (110 m), corrective action was not taken in time. The aircraft initially contacted the ground, slid for approximately 200 metres (660 ft), briefly became airborne again, and then struck trees and a farmhouse.

== Aftermath ==
The Boeing 727 involved in the accident was leased from Southern Air Transport and was Civil Air Transport's only aircraft operating international routes. The crash significantly weakened the airline's operations. Its international services were subsequently assumed by China Airlines, and Civil Air Transport ceased operations in 1975.

Exactly 30 years after this accident, China Airlines Flight 676, operating from Bali, Indonesia to Taipei, crashed in Dayuan Township, Taoyuan County, (now Dayuan District, Taoyuan City), killing 203 people (196 on board and seven on the ground).

== Changes ==
At the time of the accident, air traffic control radar systems did not provide altitude information, making it difficult to immediately determine the cause of Flight 10's unexpected descent. Following later accidents, including Eastern Air Lines Flight 401 on 29 December 1972 in Miami, the Federal Aviation Administration introduced improved radar systems capable of displaying aircraft altitude to air traffic controllers.
