= Lingshui Air Base =

Military air base located on Hainan Island, China

Coordinates: 18.49626°N 109.9881°E

Lingshui Airbase (Chinese: 陵水机场) is a naval air station located on Lingshui Li Autonomous County, Hainan Island, China. The airbase is a highly strategic location, being part of the Southern Theater Command, and within easy flying distance of the disputed islands in the South China Sea. Hainan Island is also host to a second military air base - Sanya Air Base.

== History ==
The airbase was the focus for the aftermath of what became known as the Hainan Island incident, when a US signals intelligence aircraft was forced to make an unauthorised landing there on April 1, 2001.

Analysis of Google Earth imagery since 2004 shows Lingshui Airbase is undergoing extensive redevelopment of its aircraft parking areas.

== Operations ==
Lingshui was one of the Chinese bases which supported the Guizhou Soar Dragon, although recent imagery has not confirmed the UAVs presence. Imagery analysis from photos taken in 2017 and 2020 shown a mix of reconnaissance aircraft at the airbase, including the Shaanxi KJ-500 and the Shaanxi Y-8Q

The base is also the ground base for Shenyang J-15s.
