= Civil Air Transport Flight 106 =

1964 aviation accident

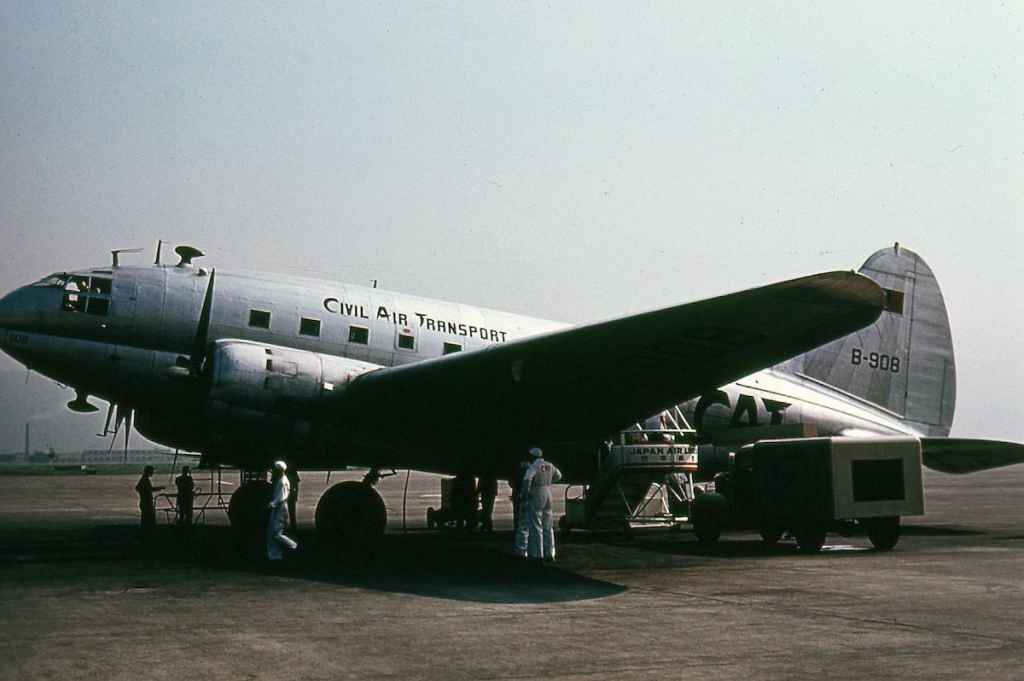
- B-908, the aircraft involved in the accident, photographed at Haneda Airport, Tokyo

Accident
- Date: 20 June 1964
- Summary: Engine failure and loss of control (Disputed)
- Site: Shenkang, Taiwan

Aircraft
- Aircraft type: Curtiss C-46D Commando
- Operator: Civil Air Transport
- Registration: B-908
- Flight origin: Taichung Airport (TXG/RCLG)
- Destination: Taipei-Sung Shan Airport (TSA/RCSS)
- Occupants: 57
- Passengers: 52
- Crew: 5
- Fatalities: 57
- Survivors: 0

Civil Air Transport Flight 106 was a Curtiss C-46D Commando, registration number B-908 (C/N 32950), that crashed on 20 June 1964, near the village of Shenkang, western Taiwan, killing all 57 people aboard. Flight 106 was operated by Civil Air Transport, a front company operated by the CIA, en route from Taichung Airport to Taipei-Sung Shan Airport.

== The accident ==
Shortly after take-off from Taichung, the number one engine oversped. The pilot began a left turn to perform an emergency landing at the airport or a nearby military air base. While turning, the pilot lost control and the aircraft crashed in a left wing low and a steep nose down attitude.

== The aircraft ==
The flight was being operated by a C-46D, which had accumulated 19,488 operational hours from 1944 to 1964.

== Causes ==
The Taiwanese CAA concluded that the primary cause of the accident was the failure of the #1 engine, compounded by pilot error during attempts at recovery while returning to Taichung Airport (later renamed Shuinan Airport and now closed) or Taichung Air Base.

However, this conclusion was disputed by Civil Air Transport, in favor of a theory of passenger hijacking.

== Passengers ==
Among the dead were 20 Americans, one Briton, and members of the Malaysian delegation to the 11th Asia-Pacific Film Festival, including businessman Loke Wan Tho and his wife Mavis.
