= Operation Zet =

Operation Zet was a secret operation in 1937–1941 by the Soviet Union to provide military and technical resources to the Republic of China as a part of the Sino-Soviet Non-Aggression Pact.

The operation aimed to help China resist the invasion of the Imperial Japanese Army during World War II. It was part of the Soviet anti-imperialist effort worldwide. In addition, the Soviet Union and the Empire of Japan had a longstanding rivalry that sometimes resulted in open hostilities.

Under Operation Zet, the Soviets provided China with warplanes, bombers, tanks, antiaircraft weapons, ammunition, and transport vehicles. The operation began with the deployment of 225 combat aircraft, along with Soviet volunteers.

The Soviet volunteer pilots were so successful that the American Assistant Naval Attaché James M. McHugh came to the conclusion that the Chinese Air Force were more loyal to the Soviet Union than to Chiang Kai-shek in 1938.

The operation was carried out in secret to maintain plausible deniability and to resist the expansionist efforts of Japan to establish itself as the pre-eminent political force in East Asia. Under the name of Soviet Air Force Volunteers, Soviet troops fought in the defense of Nanjing, Wuhan, Nanchang, and Chongqing. Over 250 Soviet volunteer pilots and 885 aircraft were provided to China. The aircraft included Polikarpov I-15, Polikarpov I-16, and Polikarpov I-153.

== See also ==
- Sino-Soviet Non-Aggression Pact
- Soviet Volunteer Group
- Lend-Lease

== Literature ==
- Михаил Юрьевич Мухин: Советский авиазавод в Синцзяне. 1930–1940-е годы, in: Новая и новейшая история, vol. 47 (2004), no. 5, pp. 236–239. Available here.
- Василий Геннадьевич Шматов: «Советские крылья» китайской авиации (о строительстве и деятельности авиасборочного завода в Синьцзяне в 1938–1941 гг.), in: Известия Алтайского государственного университета, vol. 80 (2013), no. 4–1, pp. 97–101. Available here.
