= Sanya Air Base =

Military air base located on Hainan Island, China

Coordinates: 18.28767°N 109.46365°E

Sanya Airbase is a military air base located on Hainan Island, China. The airbase is in a highly strategic location, part of the Southern Theater Command, and within easy flying distance of the disputed islands in the South China Sea. Hainan Island is also host to a second military air base: Lingshui Air Base.

== History ==
Analysis of Google Earth imagery since 2018 shows that Lingshui Airbase is undergoing extensive redevelopment of its aircraft parking areas.

== Operations ==
Sanya is one of the Chinese bases which supports the Guizhou Soar Dragon and recent imagery has confirmed the UAVs' presence. The base is also home to Harbin Z-9 helicopters.
