= Sino-Soviet Non-Aggression Pact =

Treaty between the ROC and USSR

The Sino-Soviet Non-Aggression Pact (traditional Chinese: 中蘇互不侵犯條約; simplified Chinese: 中苏互不侵犯条约; pinyin: Zhōng-sū hù bù qīnfàn tiáoyuē) was signed in Nanjing on August 21, 1937, between the Republic of China and the Soviet Union during the Second Sino-Japanese War. The pact went into effect on the day that it was signed and was registered in League of Nations Treaty Series on September 8, 1937.

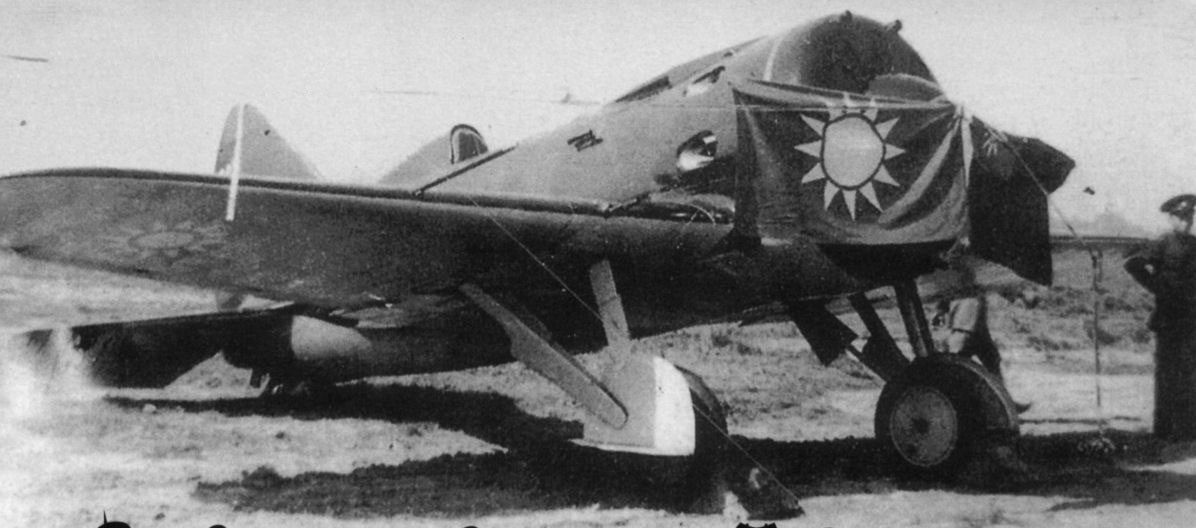
Polikarpov I-16 with Chinese insignia, the main fighter plane used by the Republic of China Air Force and the Soviet volunteers

== Effects ==
At first, the pact led to improving relations between the Kuomintang government, led by Chiang Kai-shek, and the Soviet Union. After the signing of the pact, the Soviets began sending aircraft to the Chinese national government in Operation Zet, as well as economic aid, to help stave off the Japanese invasion. Chiang hoped that was a precursor to Soviet intervention into the war, but as time passed, he soon realized that the Soviet Union was constricted in the aid that it could provide to avoid upsetting the tacit alliance with the United Kingdom, France, and later the United States, all of which favored China in the war but would back Japan against the Soviets to weaken the last two.

The treaty also allowed the Soviets to focus their attention more on the West, where Nazi Germany was building up for what appeared to be war with the Soviets, especially after the Soviet–Japanese Neutrality Pact had been signed. That contributed to the worsening relationship between China and Germany, which had already seen the end of German military assistance in China.

== Breach by Soviet Union ==
Ironically, in 1937, while the pact was being signed, the Soviets brazenly breached it before and after the signing by conducting the Xinjiang War (1937) from August to October.

The Soviet Army was assisting the puppet Governor Sheng Shicai in Xinjiang. The Kuomintang Muslim general Ma Hushan led the 36th Division (National Revolutionary Army) to resist the invasion.

Before the invasion, Ma Hushan had communicated with Chiang Kai-shek and mentioned to Peter Fleming that Chiang would send help to fight the Soviets. However, the outbreak of war against Japan led Ma to face the Soviet invasion on his own. Despite resisting and killing Soviet soldiers, Ma's forces eventually succumbed to Soviet mustard gas bombardment, and he fled to India, where he took a steamer back to China.

Sheng Shicai then invited Soviet forces to garrison in Turfan, right next to Gansu Province.

The Republic of China government was fully aware of the Soviet invasion of Xinjiang province and of Soviet troops moving around Xinjiang and Gansu, but it was forced to mask the maneuvers to the public as "Japanese propaganda" to avoid an international incident and for continued military supplies from the Soviets.

The Chinese government responded with its own military moves. Muslim general Ma Buqing then virtually controlled the Gansu corridor. He had earlier fought against the Japanese, but since the Soviet threat was great, Chiang made some arrangements regarding Ma's position. In July 1942, Chiang instructed Ma to move 30,000 troops to the Tsaidam marsh in the Qaidam Basin of Qinghai. Chiang named Ma Reclamation Commissioner, to threaten Sheng Shicai's southern flank in Xinjiang, which bordered Tsaidam.

After Ma had evacuated his positions in Gansu, Kuomintang troops from central China flooded the area and infiltrated Soviet occupied Xinjiang, gradually reclaimed it, and forced Sheng Shicai to break with the Soviets.

The Ili Rebellion broke out in Xinjiang when a Kuomintang Muslim officer, Liu Bin-Di, was killed while he was fighting Turkic Uyghur Rebels in November 1944. The Soviets supported the Turkic rebels against the Kuomintang, and Kuomintang forces fought back.

The Kuomintang government ordered Ma Bufang several times to march his troops into Xinjiang to intimidate the Soviet puppet Sheng Shicai. That helped in providing protection for Chinese settling in Xinjiang. Ma Bufang was sent with the Muslim Cavalry to Ürümqi by the Kuomintang in 1945 during the Ili Rebellion to protect it from the Uyghur army from Hi (now Ili).

== See also ==
- Sino-Soviet Treaty of Friendship
- Soviet–Japanese Neutrality Pact
- Montreux Convention Regarding the Regime of the Straits
- Mongolia in World War II
- Soviet Volunteer Group
