= Robert Prescott (disambiguation) =

Robert Prescott (c. 1726–1815) was a British soldier.

Robert Prescott may also refer to:

- Robert William Prescott (1913–1978), World War II Flying Tigers ace and aviation entrepreneur
- Robert Prescott (actor) (born 1957), American actor
- Robert de Prescot (fl. 1339–1348), MP for Lancashire (UK Parliament constituency)

== See also ==
- Bobby Prescott (born 1931), baseball player
