= Flying Tiger Line Flight 282 =

1964 aviation accident

Flying Tiger Flight 282
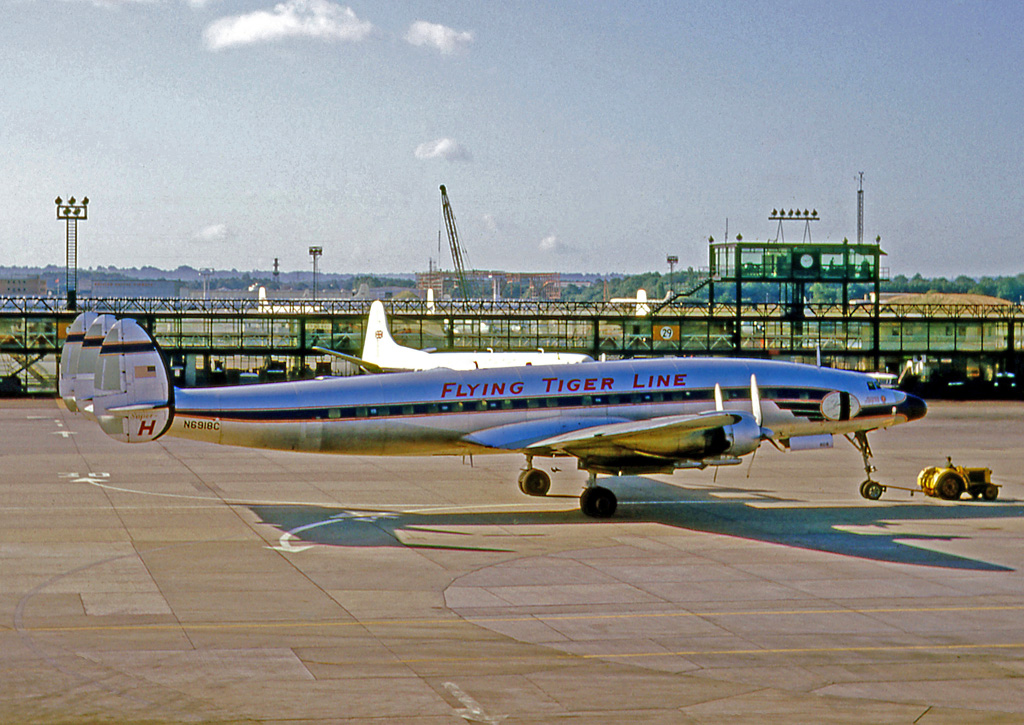
- A L-1049H of Flying Tiger Line similar to the aircraft involved

Accident
- Date: December 24, 1964
- Summary: Pilot error, Controlled flight into terrain
- Site: San Bruno, California, United States; 37°37′26″N 122°27′53″W

Aircraft
- Aircraft type: Lockheed L-1049H Super Constellation
- Operator: Flying Tiger Line
- Registration: N6915C
- Flight origin: San Francisco International Airport, California, United States
- Destination: John F. Kennedy International Airport, New York City, New York, United States
- Occupants: 3
- Passengers: 0
- Crew: 3
- Fatalities: 3
- Survivors: 0

Flying Tiger Line Flight 282 refers to the crash of a Lockheed Super Constellation aircraft, N6915C, shortly after takeoff from San Francisco International Airport in the early morning hours of Thursday, December 24, 1964.

== Description ==
On Wednesday, December 23, 1964, Flying Tiger Line Flight 282 arrived at San Francisco International Airport from Japan. Filled with a cargo of electronic equipment, bolts of fabric, women's scarves, bandannas, purses, and costume jewelry for the Christmas holiday, the craft was refueled and then departed just after midnight with a crew of three, 41,000 pounds (19,000 kg) of cargo, 136 pounds (62 kg) of mail, and 5,000 gallons of high-octane aviation fuel. There crewmen aboard were: pilot Jabez A. Richards, 49, of Bayhead, New Jersey; Daniel W. Hennessy, 33, of Hillsborough, California, as co-pilot, and Paul M. Entz, 37, of North Hollywood, California, as flight engineer. The weather was heavy fog and rain. A large cold front was moving onshore; it had already caused the loss of a Coast Guard helicopter.

Going northwest from San Francisco Bay, Flight 282 was to head out over the ocean to circle and gain altitude, then travel east toward its destination of JFK International Airport in New York City. Shortly after takeoff, however, the plane veered to the left of its planned course. The pilot subsequently asked the tower for permission to change his radio setting from takeoff to departure frequency. Seconds later, the plane vanished from the tower's radar scope.

The "Super Connie" crashed near the top of Sweeney Ridge in San Bruno, very close to the site of a Coast Guard radio station. All three crew members aboard were killed. No one on the ground was killed or injured.

The Civil Aeronautics Board determined that the probable cause of the accident was that the pilot, for undetermined reasons, deviated from departure course into an area of rising terrain, where downdraft activity and turbulence affected the ability of the craft to climb.
