= Flying Tiger Line Flight 923 =

1962 aircraft ditching in the Atlantic Ocean

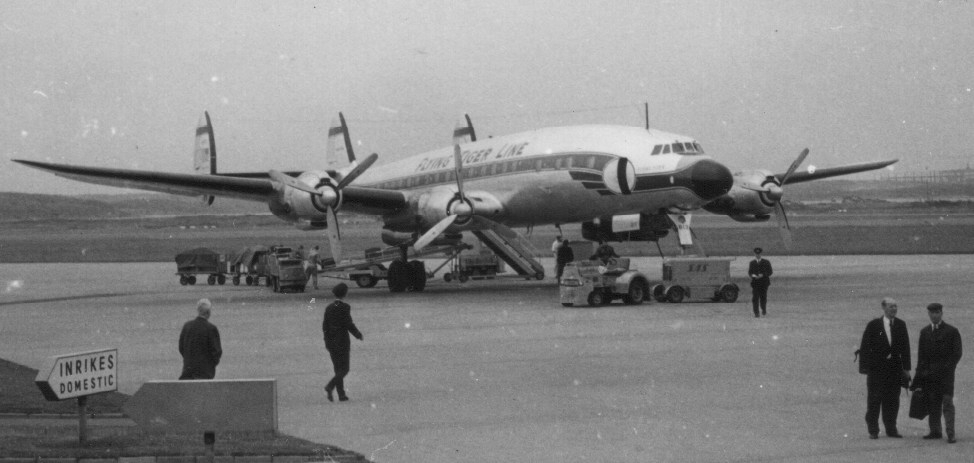
- The aircraft involved, seen in Gothenburg in 1961

Accident
- Date: September 23, 1962
- Summary: Ditching following engine failure, pilot error
- Site: Atlantic Ocean; 800km west off Shannon, Ireland

Aircraft
- Aircraft type: Lockheed L-1049H Super Constellation
- Operator: Flying Tiger Line
- Registration: N6923C
- Flight origin: McGuire Air Force Base, New Jersey, United States
- Stopover: Gander Airport, Newfoundland, Canada
- Destination: Rhein-Main Air Base, West Germany
- Occupants: 76
- Passengers: 68
- Crew: 8
- Fatalities: 28
- Survivors: 48

Flying Tiger Line Flight 923 was a chartered military transport flight that ditched in the North Atlantic Ocean on September 23, 1962. The Lockheed Constellation L-1049H was transporting 68 military personnel of the United States Army from McGuire Air Force Base in New Jersey to Rhein-Main Air Base in West Germany. While flying over the North Atlantic on the Gander-Frankfurt leg, the number 3 engine fire warning sounded, and the engine was shut down. While trying to finish the engine shutdown checklist, the flight engineer accidentally turned off the oil flow to the number 1 engine, leaving the aircraft on only two engines. Approximately an hour later and after the L-1049H started to divert to Shannon, Ireland, the number 2 engine caught on fire and was forced to be at reduced thrust. The aircraft ditched in the North Atlantic Ocean, where 48 occupants survived for six hours on a life raft until the MS Celerina arrived at the scene.

== Background ==
=== Aircraft ===
The aircraft involved was a Lockheed Constellation L-1049H, with serial number 4827 and was registered as N6923C. It was manufactured by Lockheed Corporation in 1958 and was powered by four Wright R-3350 Duplex-Cyclone engines.

=== Crew ===
The pilot in command, Captain John D Murray, was 44-years-old and had logged about 17500 hours of flying time, 4300 of which were on the L-1049 aircraft. His co-pilot, Robert W Parker, aged 27, had logged about 2430 hours of flying time, including 350 hours on the L-1049. The flight engineer, James E Garrett, aged 30, had logged about 3750 hours of flying time, 2450 of which were on the L-1049. The navigator, Samuel T Nicholson, aged 32, had logged about 7500 hours of flying time, including 4500 hours on the L-1049 aircraft.

== Flight ==
At 17:09 GMT the flight departed Gander. Around three hours later, at 20:19 GMT, the pilots reported a fire on engine No. 3, which was shut down and the fire extinguished. Unable to maintain altitude on three engines, a descent to 9000 feet was initiated. Six to seven minutes after the fire, engine No. 1 oversped and was promptly shut down and feathered. Restart attempts were unsuccessful. At 20:25 the crew requested descent clearance to 5000 feet and an escort. The weather in Keflavik, Iceland was poor, so the crew chose to continue to Shannon.

At 21:25 a fire warning sounded for engine No. 2, and power on it was reduced, but was not shut down. The warning sounded and power was reduced again. The plane managed to maintain altitude at 3000 feet. At 21:57 Riddle 18H, a Douglas DC-7 was in visual contact with Flight 923 and provided weather reports to the crew. At around this time engine No. 2 failed, forcing the crew to ditch. The failure of this engine caused a loss of hydraulic pressure, making the controls appear frozen, although Flight Engineer Garrett managed to restore it. The waves were distanced 200 feet apart and 15 to 20 feet high. Captain Murray decided to ditch into the waves, instead of parallel to them, as was procedure. The plane landed on the top of a swell and the left wing was torn off. Everyone survived the initial impact. Although there were five 25-man rafts on the plane, two in each wing and one in the crew compartment, only one was able to be used. This is because the left-wing rafts detached due to impact forces, though the reason for the failure of the right-wing rafts couldn't be determined with certainty. The one available raft was flipped over. 51 people climbed on board the raft, double its capacity, three of whom died later. The 48 survivors were rescued by the merchant ship Celerina six hours later.

== Investigation ==
The accident was investigated by the Civil Aeronautics Board (CAB). Although engines No. 2 and No. 3 failed due to unrelated mechanical failures, engine No. 1 failed due to Flight Engineer Garrett's blunder, that being pulling the firewall lever for that engine instead of engine No. 3, which cut off most fluids' flow to the engine. Although this mistake was immediately recognized and reverted by Garrett, it was too late because lack of oil in the engine led to overspeed. Investigators also criticized the captain for landing into the waves, because this increased the impact forces and may have led to the left wing detaching, taking two life rafts with it.
