= Robert William Prescott =

American aviator and entrepreneur

- Born: May 5, 1913; Fort Worth, Texas, US
- Died: March 3, 1978 (aged 64); Palm Springs, California, US
- Education: Compton Junior College
- Years active: 1939–1978
- Known for: Founder and CEO, Flying Tiger Line; Flying ace Pilot, China National Aviation Corporation
- Aviation career
- Air force: United States Navy; American Volunteer Group
- Battles: World War II

Robert William Prescott (May 5, 1913 – March 3, 1978) was an American aviator and entrepreneur. An ace with the Flying Tigers in the early part of World War II, he went on to found the Flying Tiger Line, the first scheduled cargo airline in the United States.

== Early life ==
Prescott was born in Fort Worth, Texas. After high school, in 1934 he moved to California and worked his way through Compton Junior College as a truck driver. He was also working and attending Loyola Law School in Los Angeles when some friends dragged him along on a visit to the naval flying school at Long Beach. Prescott was hooked.

== Aviator ==
In 1939, he quit studying law and enlisted in the United States Navy to become a pilot. Prescott completed training and qualified as an aviator, and was commissioned as an ensign in 1940. He became an instructor at the naval flying school in Pensacola, Florida. He resigned his commission in September 1941 to join the American Volunteer Group (AVG) to fight the Japanese in China. Before the AVG disbanded in the summer of 1942, he was credited with either 5.5 or 6 victories. Rather than follow his commander, Claire Chennault, and a few of his comrades into the American military, Prescott returned to Fort Worth, where he was interviewed by Fort Worth Press journalist Helen Ruth Verheyden.

In 1943, he returned to Asia and, as an employee of the China National Airways Corporation, made over 300 supply flights over "the Hump" into China. After returning to the United States in 1944, he married Helen Ruth. He was the co-pilot of the "Mission to Moscow" flight of US Ambassador Joseph E. Davies.

== Flying Tiger Line ==
In 1945, Prescott met a group of businessmen headed by Los Angeles oil magnate Samuel B. Mosher who were interested in starting a cargo airline to serve the west coast of the United States and Mexico. He convinced them that it would make better business sense to cover all of the continental United States instead. They agreed to match whatever funds Prescott could raise. He raised $89,000 and recruited nine of his Flying Tigers pilot buddies, many of them fellow aces: William Bartling, Clifford Groh, C. H. "Link" Laughlin, Thomas Haywood, Robert Hedman, Ernest "Bus" Loane, Robert J. "Catfish" Raine, Joseph Rosbert and Richard Rossi.

The National Skyway Freight Corporation was established on June 25, 1945, with Mosher as president and Prescott as managing director. The new company's motto was "We'll Fly Anything, Anywhere, Anytime". Prescott purchased 14 Budd RB Conestoga Navy surplus cargo planes for $140,000, then sold six at a profit.

Their first shipment took place in July. They lost $21,000 the first month of operations and $12,000 the second, but were making a profit by the third. However, the charter freight airline began to have financial trouble, so Prescott applied to the Civil Aeronautics Board for a certificate allowing scheduled services. In the meantime, salvation came in the form of a six-month contract with the US Army's Air Transport Command for pilots and maintenance services, later extended to November 1947.

In 1947, the company's name was changed to Flying Tiger Line. It was "the nation's first regularly scheduled transcontinental all-freight company". The company prospered and expanded, and Prescott remained its only president and chief executive officer until his death in 1978.

Prescott appeared as himself on the October 7, 1963, episode of the CBS panel show To Tell the Truth.

== Death ==
Prescott died of cancer at his home in Palm Springs, California, on March 3, 1978, at the age of 64.

His 11-year-old son, Peter, was killed in a Learjet crash near Palm Springs in 1965; he also had two daughters.

Prescott's widow, Dr. Anne Marie Bennstrom, invented the "V-bar" physical therapy device while a physical medicine intern in Sweden. It achieved significant commercial success when marketed under the ThighMaster name.
