= Flying Tiger Line Flight 45 =

1970 aviation accident

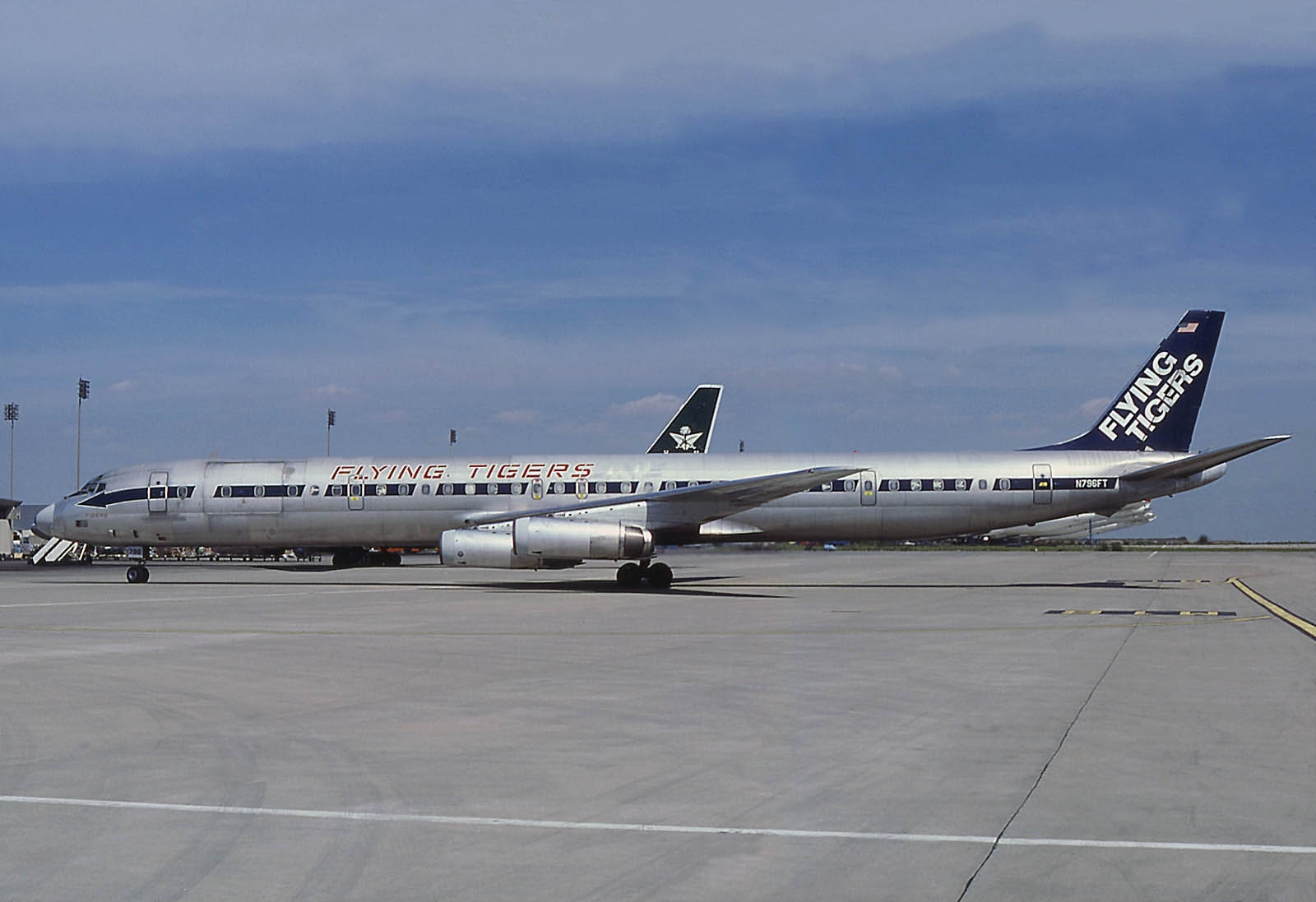
- A DC-8-63F of Flying Tigers, similar to the one involved in the accident

Accident
- Date: July 27, 1970
- Summary: Controlled flight into terrain in low visibility
- Site: Naha Air Force Base, Okinawa, U.S. Civil Admin. of the Ryukyu Is.

Aircraft
- Aircraft type: Douglas DC-8-63F
- Operator: Flying Tiger Line
- IATA flight No.: FT45
- ICAO flight No.: FTL45
- Call sign: TIGER 45
- Registration: N785FT
- Flight origin: Los Angeles International Airport, Westchester, Los Angeles, California, United States
- Stopover: San Francisco International Airport, San Mateo County, California, United States
- 1st stopover: Seattle–Tacoma International Airport, SeaTac, Washington, United States
- 2nd stopover: Cold Bay Airport, Cold Bay, Alaska, United States
- 3rd stopover: Haneda Airport, Ōta, Tokyo, Japan
- 4th stopover: Naha Air Force Base, Okinawa
- 5th stopover: Kai Tak Airport, British Hong Kong
- Last stopover: Cam Ranh Bay Air Force Base, Khánh Hòa, South Vietnam
- Destination: Da Nang Air Base, Da Nang, South Vietnam
- Occupants: 4
- Crew: 4
- Fatalities: 4
- Survivors: 0

Flying Tiger Line Flight 45 was a regularly scheduled cargo flight by Flying Tiger Line from Los Angeles to Da Nang Air Base in South Vietnam, with intermediate stops at San Francisco, Seattle, Cold Bay, Tokyo, Naha, Hong Kong, and Cam Ranh. On July 27, 1970, the flight, a Douglas DC-8, crashed on final approach as it was trying to make its 4th stopover at Naha Airport (then Naha Air Base) in Okinawa, which was under US administration at the time.

== Aircraft ==
The aircraft involved was a Douglas DC-8-63F registered as N785FT with serial number 46005. It was manufactured in 1968 and purchased by Flying Tiger Line on November 19. It had logged 6047.2 airframe hours and was powered by four Pratt & Whitney JT3D-7 engines, each generating about 19,000 pounds of thrust.

== Overview ==
The aircraft involved in the incident was a Douglas DC 8-63F with the registration number N785FT and serial number 46009, and powered by four Pratt & Whitney JT3D-7 engines. The aircraft was delivered to Flying Tiger Line on November 19, 1968. At the time of the incident, the aircraft had accumulated a total of 6047.2 hours. The aircraft took off from Los Angeles International Airport at 20:53PM on July 25 and after 3 scheduled stops arrived at Haneda Airport at 22:44PM on July 26. The aircraft and crew stayed over at Tokyo for the night before taking off on 9:29AM for Naha Air Base.

The aircraft was making its final approach to Naha Air Base's Runway 18 using precision radar approach at around 11:35AM when the aircraft's rate of descent increased and subsequently crashed 2,000 feet short of the runway. All four crew members died.

== Cause ==
Flying Tiger Line Flight 45 flew from Tokyo to Naha using IFR, and crashed on final approach just as it had passed a low level raincloud.

The investigation by the National Transportation Safety Board concludes that the aircraft encountered a tropical storm while on approach with visibility not reaching 1 mile, only for visibility to increase by 10 to a 100 times once the clouds cleared, blinding the piloting crews and making the approach difficult.
