= Samuel B. Mosher =

American oil entrepreneur/industrialist (1892–1970)

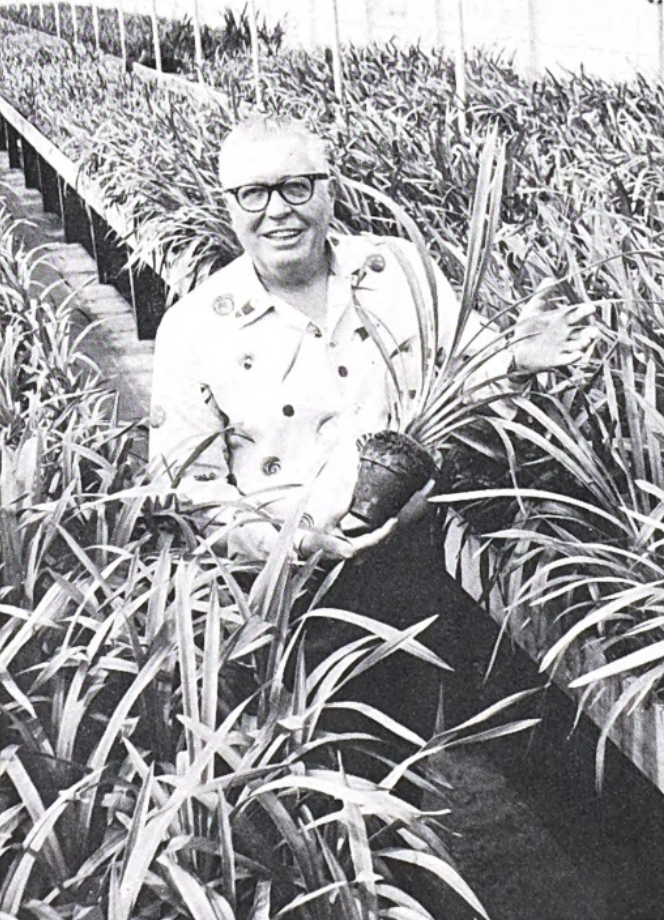
- Mosher in his greenhouse in the 1950s
- Born: Samuel Barlow Mosher; October 13, 1892; Carthage, New York; United States
- Died: August 4, 1970 (aged 77); Goleta, California; United States
- Education: University of California, Berkeley (BSc)
- Occupations: oil entrepreneur industrialist horticulturalist
- Known for: Signal Oil and Gas; Flying Tiger Line

Samuel B. Mosher (1892 – 1970) was an American oil entrepreneur, industrialist and horticulturalist who, from a modest start, created Signal Oil and Gas (originally Signal Gasoline), which became the largest California-based independent oil company and then a diversified industrial company. Signal purchased Garrett AiResearch, an aerospace company, in 1964 and attempted to buy Douglas Aircraft in 1966, losing out to McDonnell Aircraft Corporation. In 1967 it purchased Mack Trucks and a bank and changed its name to The Signal Companies in 1968. In 1969, the year before Mosher's death, The Signal Companies had annual revenues of $1.5 billion (over $13 billion in 2025 dollars). The Signal Companies would become one of the founding entities of today's Honeywell aerospace company via AlliedSignal.

Mosher had other non-oil interests including helping privatize shipping company American President Lines and backing the creation and development of Flying Tiger Line, one of the first (and by the 1960s, the leading) US scheduled cargo airline. Signal purchased Laura Scudder's in 1957, selling it on to PET Milk Company in 1962. Mosher also had horticulture interests, cultivating orchids commercially at his Goleta, California estate, Rancho Dos Pueblos, through his Dos Pueblos Orchid Company.

== Early life ==
Mosher was born in Carthage, New York to Henry Miles Mosher and Etta Barlow Mosher. Henry was a hardware merchant who later, in California, was part of an unsuccessful oil venture. Samuel contracted polio young, but was noted later in life for his physical vigor. His doctors recommended that the family move to California. Mosher obtained a degree in agriculture from University of California, Berkeley in 1916 and tried his hand at citrus farming. This was not successful.

== Career in oil ==
At the time, California was a center of oil exploration and production. In early 1920s, a large oil field was found at Signal Hill near Long Beach. Great quantities of associated petroleum gas (APG) was flared (burned) at such locations. Mosher read a government publication about "absorption" of natural gasoline vapor present in APG and in 1921, with partners, created a device to produce the substance, a high volatility liquid typically blended into refined gasoline. He was staked by $4000 from his parents (around $75,000 in 2025 terms). Mosher offered a 33% royalty to any oil producer that would let him run its APG through his device. The business was called Signal Gasoline. After a falling-out with his original partners in 1924, the business remained under Mosher-family control for the rest of Mosher's life.

The company benefitted from a close relationship with Standard Oil of California (today's Chevron Corporation). In 1925, for instance, Signal entered into a five-year agreement where Standard agreed to take all of Signal's natural gasoline. Signal expanded into oil production in 1928, becoming Signal Oil and Gas. In 1931, Signal signed a 10-year agreement with Standard whereby Standard took all of Signal's oil and natural gasoline and supplied Standard with refined products in return. This arrangement would last until the end of 1957. The company developed its own retail gasoline stations under the Signal brand and during the early years of the Great Depression bet heavily on US recovery, expanding to Oregon and Washington. In 1947, in another agreement with Standard, Signal exited the retail business by selling Standard the Signal retail brand.

Signal was a pioneer of directional drilling, using so-called "whipstock" wells to source offshore oil from tideland locations in coastal California such as Long Beach, Santa Barbara and Huntington Beach. In pursuit of such business, Signal acquired Rancho Dos Pueblos in 1943, which it used as a drilling site. The location became Mosher's home, and he established the Dos Pueblos Orchid Company, becoming a leading grower of orchids. As an outgrowth of its directional drilling business, Signal became adept at low-impact drilling and oil recovery, later successfully sourcing oil without noise or odor from such locations as a Cheviot Hills country club in Los Angeles.

After World War II, Signal expanded outside the US. Signal was a partner in Ralph K. Davies's American Independent Oil Company, founded as a vehicle to allow independent US oil producers to operate offshore, but also operated on its own behalf outside the US in locations such as Venezuela, Argentina and the Middle East. J. Howard Marshall was executive vice president of Signal 1952–1960, Mosher allowing Marshall to use 1/3 of his time for his own activities, the other 2/3 for Signal. Marshall's 1994 autobiography credited Mosher as one of his four primary influences, noted Mosher's intellectual side (a "longing ... to understand the 'why' of doing") and called him "one in a million." When Marshall left Signal to become a full-time oil entrepreneur for himself, Mosher gave Marshall an ex gratia payment of $100,000 (over $1 million in 2025 terms). Marshall noted Mosher didn't have to do that, Mosher said he knew that, but he wanted to.

Between 1958 and 1959 Signal quickly merged with three other oil companies, emerging as a fully integrated oil company including a petrochemical business.

== Flying Tiger Line and other non-oil businesses ==
Just before the end of World War II, Mosher was introduced to Robert Prescott, a flying ace of the American Volunteer Group, better known as the Flying Tigers, that fought against the Japanese in China. Prescott had the idea of founding a US freight airline, which appealed to Mosher due to his interest in transporting flowers. Mosher backed Prescott, becoming chair of what was originally National Skyway Freight, later changing its name to the Flying Tiger Line due to the background of Prescott and other partners. Mosher associates became key legal and financial executives of the nascent airline, which also, on his advice, quickly went public in 1946, providing it with a strong financial foundation.

Signal also backed Ralph Davies's successful bid to privatize the American President Lines (APL) shipping company in 1952.

In 1957, Signal bought the businesses of Laura Scudder, selling them on to Pet Milk Co. in 1962.

In 1963, following the death of its founder, Los Angeles aerospace company Garrett AiResearch was the object of a hostile takeover by Curtiss-Wright, and Signal stepped in to buy Garrett, closing the deal in January 1964. In 1966 Signal attempted to buy Douglas Aircraft, losing to McDonnell Aircraft Corporation, but purchased Mack Trucks, as well as an Arizona bank in 1967.

== Personal life ==
Mosher was married three times and had a daughter. He was a member of the University of California Board of Regents, a trustee of Occidental College, a director of Ducks Unlimited and member of many other clubs and organizations.
