= Flying Tiger Line =

Cargo airline of the United States (1945–1989)

| IATA | ICAO | Call sign |
|---|---|---|
| FT | FTL | TIGER |
- Founded: June 25, 1945; 81 years ago
- Ceased operations: August 7, 1989; 36 years ago (merged into Federal Express)
- Hubs: Los Angeles; New York–JFK
- Headquarters: Los Angeles, California, United States

Flying Tiger Line, also known as Flying Tigers, was the first scheduled cargo airline in the United States and a military charter operator during the Cold War era for both cargo and personnel (the latter with leased aircraft). The airline was bought by Federal Express in 1989.

== History ==
=== Early years ===
Old logo

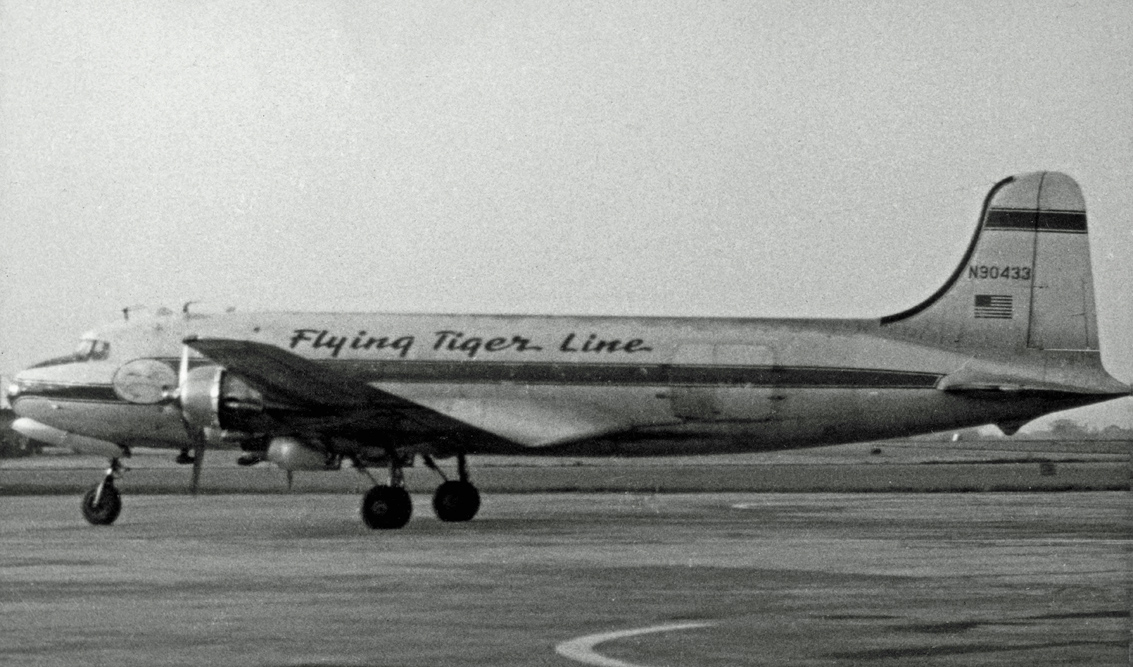
DC-4 at Manchester, UK May 1955. Four months later this aircraft ditched in the Pacific with the loss of three crew.

The airline was named after the Flying Tigers fighter unit of World War II, officially the 1st American Volunteer Group. After returning to the United States in 1945, ten former AVG pilots led by Robert William Prescott established the Flying Tiger Line on 24 June 1945 under the name National Skyway Freight using a small fleet of 14 Budd RB Conestoga freighters purchased as war surplus from the United States Navy. The pilots and two ground crew provided half of the initial investment, with the balance coming from California oil tycoon Samuel B. Mosher. For the next four years, Flying Tiger Line carried air freight on contract throughout the U.S. and, as the airline expanded, carrying supplies to U.S. troops under Gen. Douglas MacArthur during the occupation of Japan.

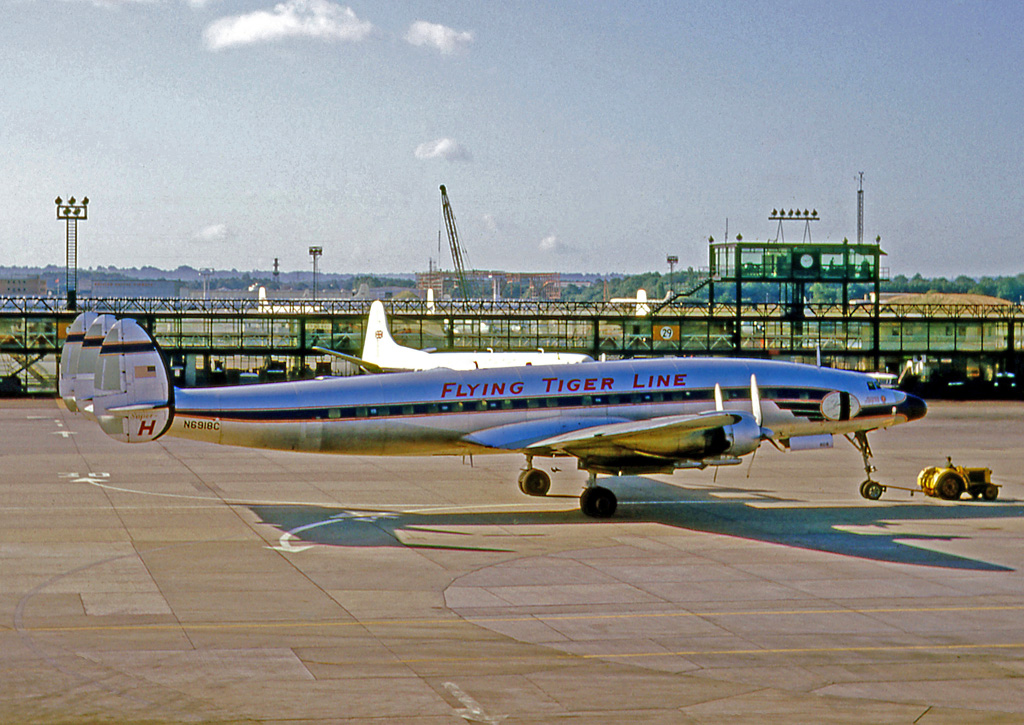
A L-1049H Super Constellation in Gatwick (1964)

In 1949, the Civil Aeronautics Board (CAB) awarded Flying Tiger Line (along with Slick Airways) a scheduled cargo certificate for a transcontinental route from Los Angeles and San Francisco, California to Boston, Massachusetts. Shortly afterwards, the company began chartering passenger aircraft for group travel as well; its Lockheed Super Constellation, Douglas DC-4 and DC-6 fleet comprised the largest trans-Atlantic charter operation through the 1950s.

During the Korean War, Flying Tiger aircraft were chartered to transport troops and supplies from the United States to Asia; Flying Tigers later received a cargo route award to Japan, China, and Southeast Asia. The airline also played a major role in the construction of the Distant Early Warning Line, flying equipment to remote outposts in northern Canada and Alaska.

Flying Tiger Line adopted the Canadair CL-44 swing-tail aircraft in 1961, becoming one of the first carriers in the world to offer aerial pallet shipping service.

=== 1960s-1970s: Jet age ===
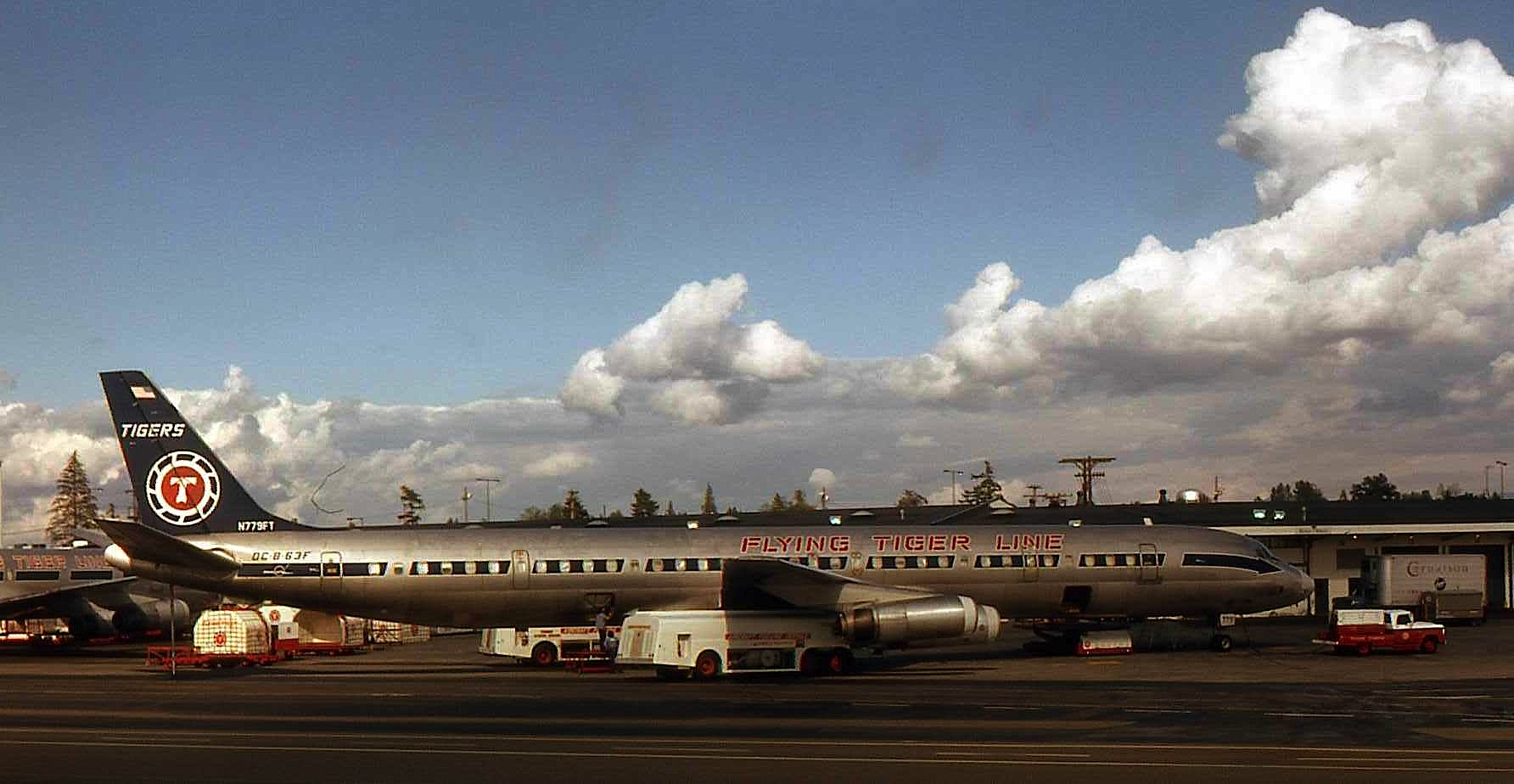
The airline's first Douglas DC 8-63F delivered to the airline, seen at Seattle airport in 1972

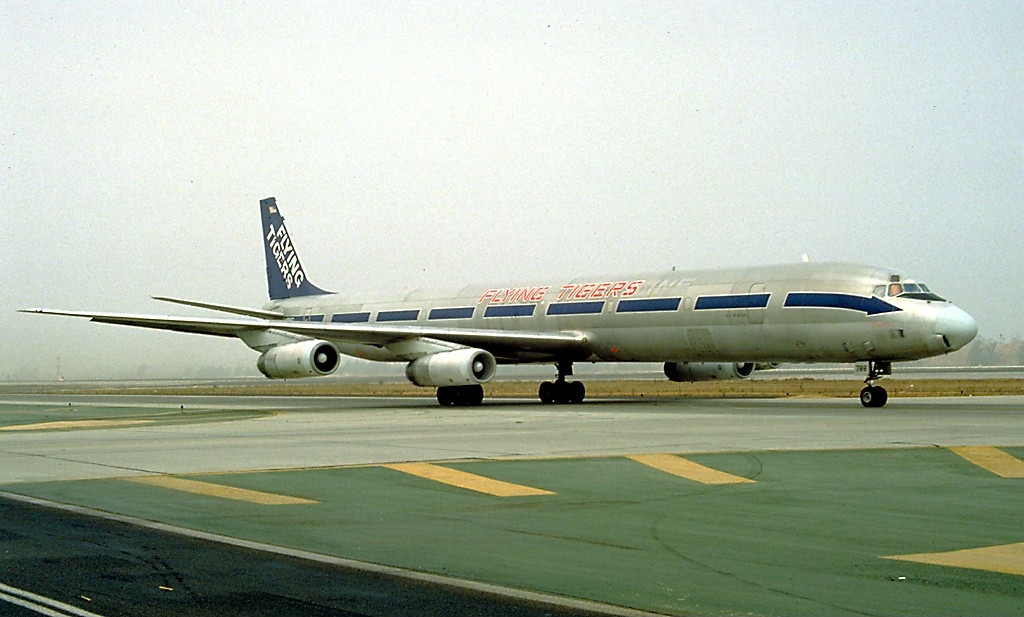
Douglas DC 8-63AF in revised livery

Flying Tiger Line began operating jet aircraft on September 27, 1965, when the first (as N322F) of four Boeing 707s was delivered. On 15 November that same year, a modified Flying Tigers Boeing 707-349C made the first ever aerial circumnavigation of the Earth via the poles, in 62 hours 27 minutes. The aircraft carried additional fuel in two additional tanks installed in the main cabin. The Boeing 707 remained in the fleet for only a few years and was replaced by the higher-payload Douglas DC-8, the largest civilian airliner until the Boeing 747 entered service. The first Douglas DC-8-63F, registered as N779FT, was delivered to the airline on June 26, 1968, and the other eighteen followed until 1972.

In 1974, the airline took delivery of its first Boeing 747. Flying Tigers then placed orders for brand-new Boeing 747-200F freighters designated the Boeing 747-249F, which at the time were among the heaviest commercial airplanes flying, weighing 823,000 pounds (373,000 kg). These aircraft had the powerful "Q" (Pratt & Whitney JT9D-7Q) engines and heavy landing gear and could simultaneously carry both 250,000 pounds (110,000 kg) of fuel and 250,000 pounds (110,000 kg) of cargo loaded through both the nose door and the side door at the same time. Aircraft loaders had earlier refused to work at the extreme 30 feet (9 m) height necessary for loading freight on the upper deck, so the "supernumerary area" or "hump" was configured with 19 first class seats instead which were used to transport livestock handlers, charter agents and mechanics as well as dead-heading pilots and flight attendants.

=== 1980s: Later years and merger with Federal Express ===
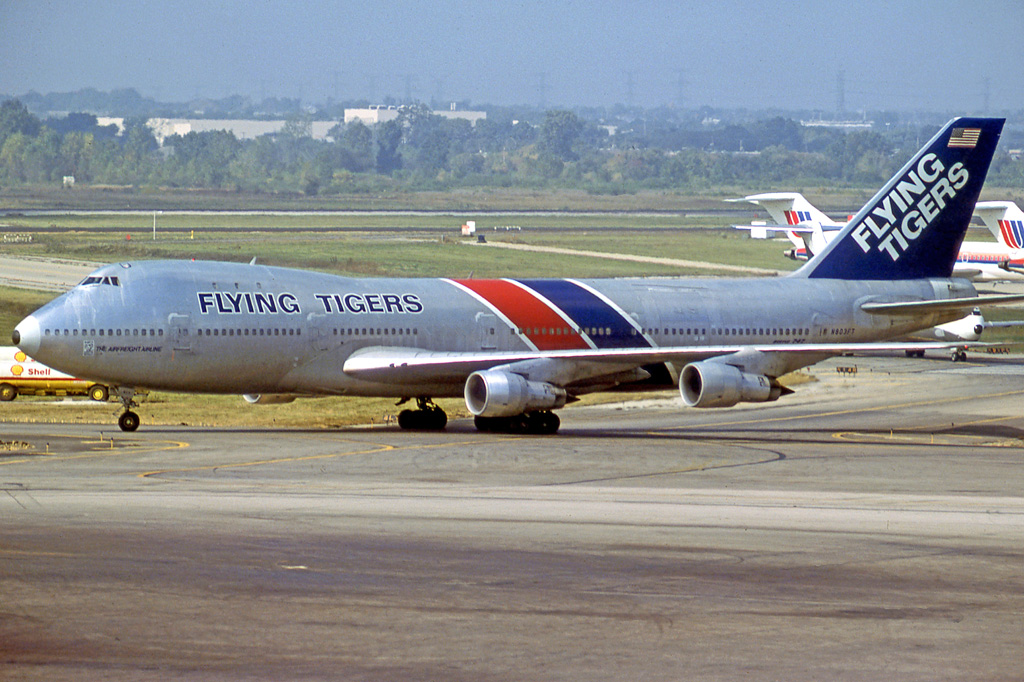
Flying Tigers Boeing 747-132SF freighter at Chicago O'Hare Airport in 1979

Tiger's Ad Hoc Charter livestock flights provided airlift for exotic animals. Two examples were thoroughbred racehorses and show animals from Stansted, England to the Melbourne Cup, as well as breeding stock cattle (milk supply) to nations such as Japan and Thailand. They became known for carrying a number of unique cargoes, including Shamu the SeaWorld killer whale and the torch of the Statue of Liberty.

By the mid-1980s, Flying Tigers operated scheduled cargo service to six continents and served 58 countries. It surpassed Pan American World Airways in 1980 as the world's largest air cargo carrier after acquiring its rival cargo airline Seaboard World Airlines on 1 October 1980. It also operated military contract services, most notably DC-8 routes between Travis Air Force Base, California and Japan in the 1970s, followed by weekly 747 passenger service between Clark Air Base, Philippines, and St. Louis, Missouri via Japan, Alaska, and Los Angeles during the 1980s. Covert flights for the military were not uncommon throughout the airline's history, given its roots in Civil Air Transport (CAT), as with its sister airline Air America, originally owned by General Claire Lee Chennault, commander of the Flying Tigers fighter squadron in Southeast Asia.

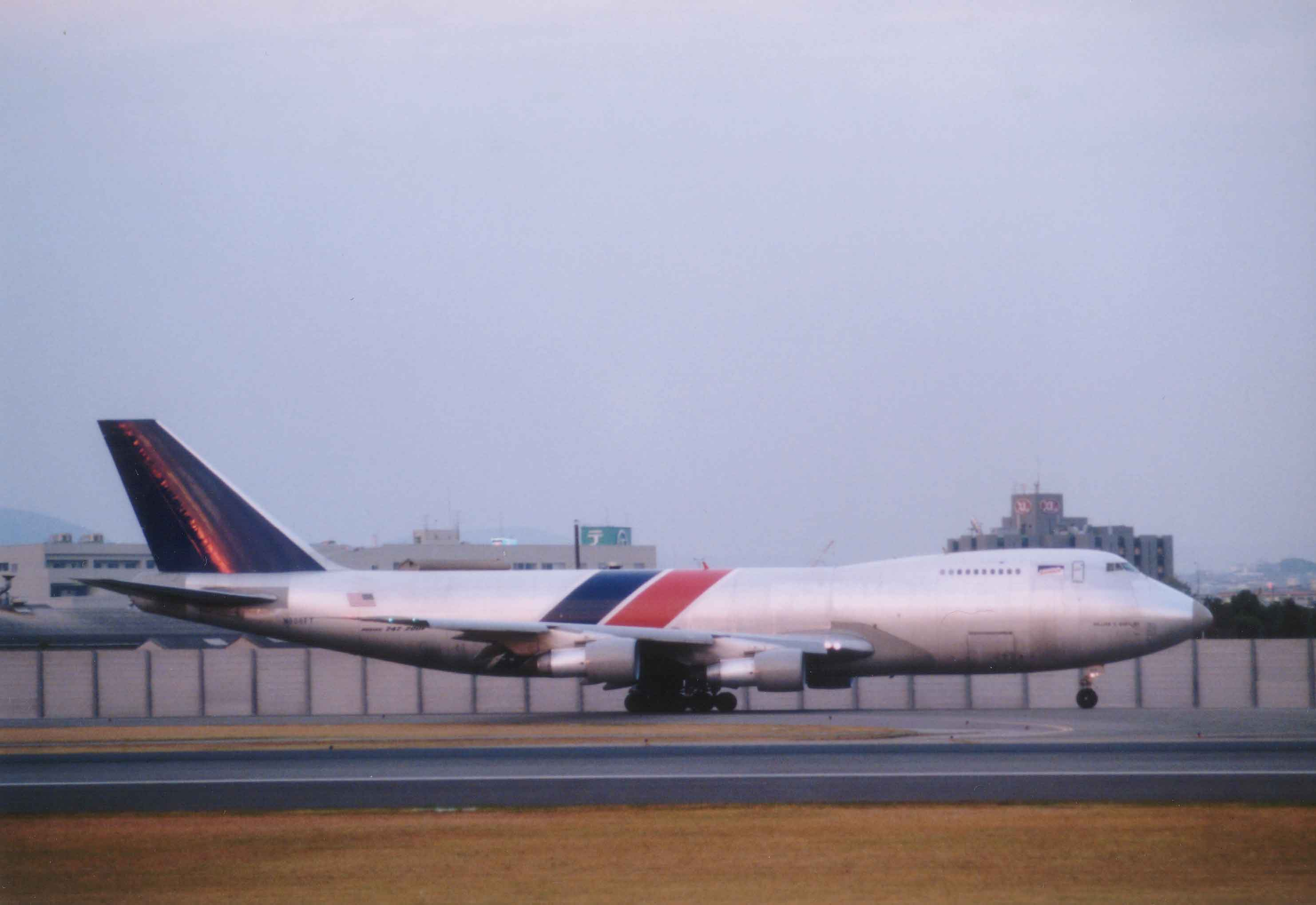
Ex-Flying Tiger Boeing 747-200F (There is a tiny FedEx logo aft of the cockpit window; Japan required FedEx aircraft to retain the Flying Tiger paint job for several years.)

At its peak, the Tigers employed approximately 251 flight attendants and carried up to a record 594 passengers and crew on its MAC all-coach passenger flights. Approximately 998 pilots worked for the airline based throughout the US. Large crew bases were situated in Los Angeles, New York City and Lockbourne, Ohio (Rickenbacker International Airport). The Los Angeles headquarters operation included its own engine shop and jet maintenance business. Flying Tigers also made livestock carriers for airplanes, some comparable in external size and shape to the standard AMJ container used in the FedEx flight operations. They operated a recording company subsidiary, Happy Tiger Records, from 1969 to 1971.

After airline deregulation, stiff competition buffeted profits and, with some unsuccessful diversification attempts by parent Tiger International, the airline began sustaining losses in 1981. Then-CEO Stephen Wolf sold Flying Tigers to Federal Express in December 1988. On August 7, 1989, Federal Express merged Flying Tigers into its operations.

== Other ventures ==
=== Metro International Airways (1981–1983) ===
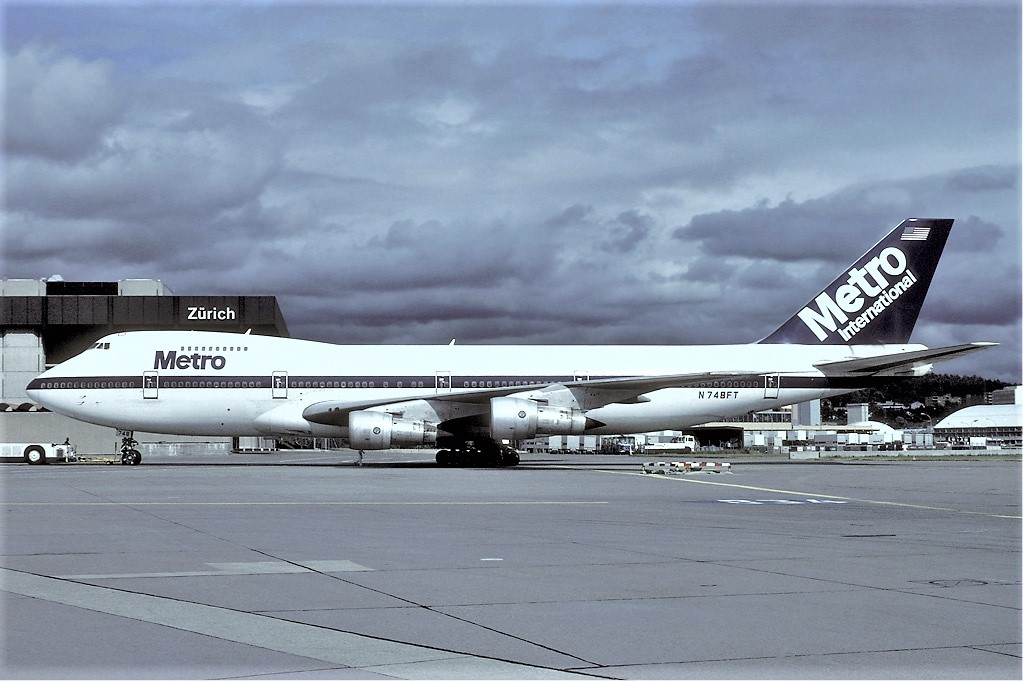
Metro International 747-200 at Zurich Airport in 1982

In December 1980, Tiger asked the CAB to approve the name Metro International Airways (MIA) as a tradename for passenger flights, leveraging passenger route authority it inherited from Seaboard. The CAB approved February 1981 under the conditions MIA operate aircraft no smaller than a DC-8 and not operate in six states near/including Texas to avoid confusion with Houston-based commuter airline Metro Airlines. MIA was announced in January 1981 as a New York-based division to operate charter and scheduled passenger flights, in part as a way to use three passenger 747-200B aircraft Tiger acquired from Singapore Airlines and was unable to sell. Tiger shut MIA in 1983. In early 1983, Tiger swapped MIA's three 747-200Bs to Pan Am for four 747-100F aircraft, obtaining temporary replacements, one of which was a 747 subleased from pre-certification Tower Air. A Tower Air predecessor organization was MIA's General Sales Agent. Tower was separately certificated later in 1983 and thus (as is sometimes claimed) did not buy MIA, but did take over MIA's scheduled route from New York to Tel Aviv via Brussels, the route for which Tower was certificated.

=== Non-aviation ventures ===
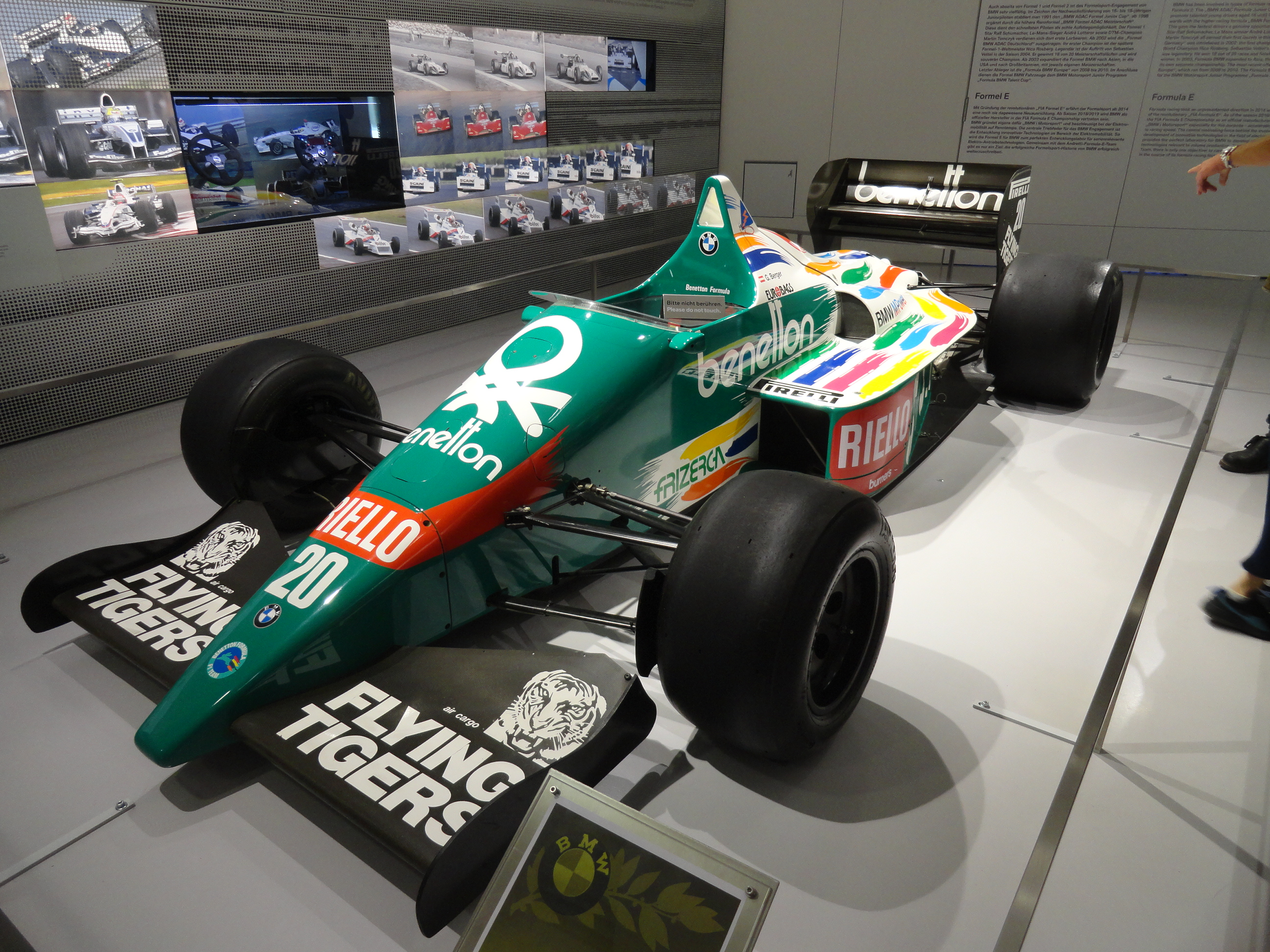
Benetton B186 of Gerhard Berger with the Flying Tigers logo on the front wing

Flying Tigers was a sponsor of the Benetton Formula One team for the 1986 season.

== Fleet ==
January 1952:

- 26 Curtiss C-46
- 12 Douglas DC-4

At the time of its sale to FedEx, Flying Tigers were operating the following aircraft:

- 8 Boeing 747-100
- 13 Boeing 747-200
- 19 Boeing 727-100
- 6 Douglas DC-8-73

== Accidents and incidents ==
- On July 30, 1950, Curtiss C-46F N67960 crashed on takeoff from Denver due to unknown performance problems; both pilots and both passengers survived, but the aircraft was written off.
- On August 21, 1952, Curtiss C-46F N67983 made a wheels-up emergency landing in a field near Grand Island, Nebraska when the captain, conducting en-route flight training of the first officer, simulated a right-engine failure. The probable cause of the accident was poor judgment of the crew in trying to recover. The crew survived, the aircraft was substantially damaged.
- On January 7, 1953, Flight 841, Douglas DC-4 N86574, struck the base of Squak Mountain near Issaquah, Washington due to pilot error during an attempted instrument approach to Boeing Field, Seattle, killing all seven on board. The aircraft was being ferried from Burbank.
- On September 24, 1955, Flight 7413/23, Douglas DC-4 N90433, ditched in the Pacific between Honolulu and Wake Island after the crew mismanaged fuel transfers leading to power out on three engines, then mismanaged engine restarts. One crew member was trapped on board and died when the aircraft sank, the other four survived the crash but two died of injuries, exposure and shark attacks. Two were rescued.
- On March 18, 1956, Curtiss C-46F N9995F crashed at Pelly Bay, Canada after the left wing struck terrain while on night-time VFR approach, both pilots and the passenger survived, but the aircraft was written off.
- On September 9, 1958, L-1049H Super Constellation N6920C struck Mount Ōyama en-route from Guam to Tachikawa AB, killing all eight on board.
- On March 15, 1962, Flight 7816/14, L-1049H Super Constellation N6911C, crashed on approach to Adak Island Naval Air Station, Alaska on a flight from Cold Bay due to pilot error, killing one of seven on board. The aircraft was operating a Military Air Transport Service (MATS) cargo flight from Travis AFB to Kadena Air Base.
- On March 16, 1962, Flight 739 (also known as Flight 7815/13) L-1049H Super Constellation N6921C disappeared over the Pacific en-route from Guam to Clark AFB in the Philippines with 107 on board. A ship witnessed an explosion but the accident was otherwise unsolved. This accident remains the worst ever accident involving the L-1049.
- On September 23, 1962, Flight 923, L-1049H Super Constellation N6923C, ditched in the North Atlantic killing 28 of 76 on board. Two engines failed of their own accord, the flight engineer mismanaged a third, causing it also to shut down. The aircraft was operating a MATS charter flight from Gander to Frankfurt.
- On December 14, 1962, Flight 183, L-1049H Super Constellation N6913C, crashed on approach to Burbank, California from Chicago due to pilot incapacitation (suspected heart attack), killing all five on board and three on the ground.
- On December 24, 1964, Flight 282, L-1049H Super Constellation N6915C crashed shortly after departure from San Francisco on a flight to New York City after an unexplained course change, killing the three crew.
- On December 15, 1965, Flying Tiger Line Flight 914, L-1049H Super Constellation N6914C, struck California Peak at 13,000 ft after the pilot became disorientated in IFR conditions, killing the three crew.
- On March 21, 1966, Flying Tiger Line Flight 6303, flying for Quicktrans, a Canadair CL-44 (N453T), crashed on landing at NAS Norfolk due to pilot error; all six crew survived, but the aircraft was written off.
- On December 24, 1966, a Flying Tiger Line Canadair CL-44 (N228SW) crashed on landing near Da Nang, killing all four crew and 107 on the ground.
- On July 27, 1970, Flying Tiger Line Flight 45, a Douglas DC-8 (N785FT), crashed in the water off Naha Air Base, Okinawa, killing all four crew.
- On February 15, 1979, Flying Tiger Line Flight 74, a Boeing 747 (N804FT), was landing at O'Hare International Airport in heavy fog whilst Delta Air Lines Flight 349, a Boeing 727, was crossing the active runway Flight 74 was landing on. The two aircraft narrowly avoided a ground collision when Flight 74 swerved into the grass beside the runway. No one was injured, and the aircraft was returned to service.
- On October 11, 1983, Flying Tiger Line Flight 9014, a Boeing 747 (N806FT), ran off the runway at Frankfurt International Airport after a cargo pallet broke loose; the three crew and three passengers survived; the aircraft was substantially damaged, but was repaired and returned to service.
- On October 25, 1983, Flying Tiger Line Flight 2468, a Douglas DC-8 (N797FT), ran off the runway at NAS Norfolk due to crew and ATC errors; all five on board survived; the aircraft was substantially damaged but was repaired and returned to service.
- August 6, 1986 – A Flying Tigers aircraft, bound for Columbus Rickenbacker International Airport (LCK), mistakenly lands at Bolton Field.
- On February 19, 1989, Flying Tiger Line Flight 066 crashed near Kuala Lumpur due to crew and ATC errors, killing all four crew.

== See also ==
- List of defunct airlines of the United States
