= Budd RB Conestoga =

Aircraft for the US Navy in World War II

RB Conestoga
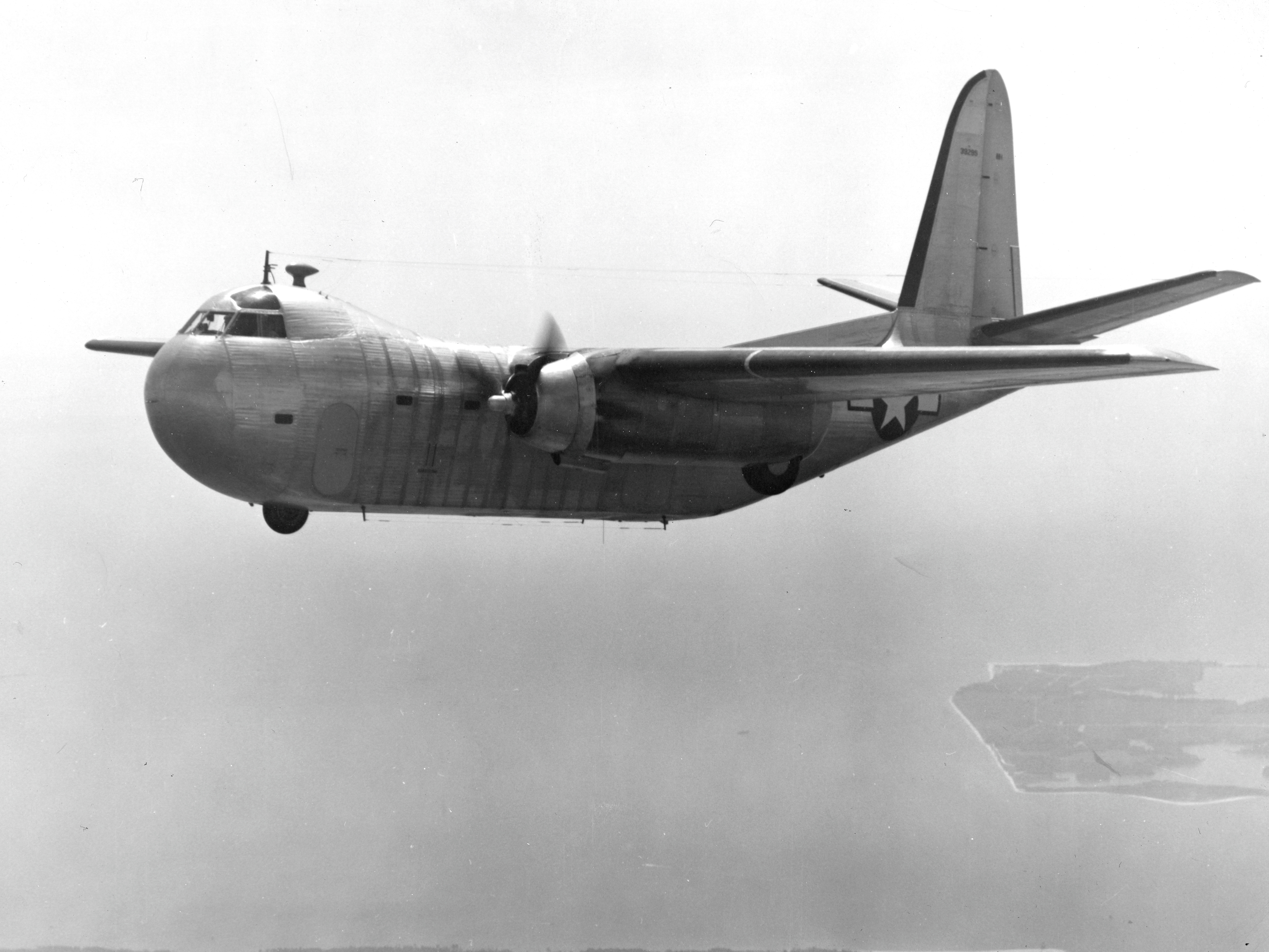

General information
- Type: Military transport aircraft
- National origin: United States
- Manufacturer: Budd Company
- Status: Retired
- Primary users: United States Navy Flying Tiger Line
- Number built: 17

History
- Introduction date: 1944
- First flight: 31 October 1943

The Budd RB-1 Conestoga was a twin-engine, stainless steel cargo aircraft designed for the United States Navy during World War II by the Budd Company of Philadelphia, Pennsylvania. Although it did not see service in a combat theater, it pioneered design innovations in American cargo aircraft, later incorporated in modern military cargo airlifters.

== Design and development ==
World War II created a great demand for military transport aircraft in the United States. Because of initial fears of a shortage of aluminum, the War Department explored the use of other materials for aircraft construction. Budd, the developer of the shotweld technique for welding stainless steel and a manufacturer of stainless steel railroad cars, automobile, bus, and truck bodies, hired an aeronautical engineering staff and worked with the U.S. Navy to develop a new twin-engine transport aircraft constructed primarily of stainless steel. The U.S. Navy accepted the proposal for the new aircraft, and placed an order for 200, to be designated RB-1. The U.S. Army Air Forces (USAAF) followed with an order for 600, designated C-93.

The Conestoga was a twin-engine high-wing monoplane with tricycle landing gear. The elevated flight deck was contained in a distinctive, almost hemispherical nose section. Its two 1,200 hp (890 kW) Pratt & Whitney R-1830-92, "Twin Wasp" air-cooled, 14-cylinder, two-row radial engines, the same engines fitted to the C-47, drove three-bladed Hamilton Standard Hydromatic, constant-speed, full-feathering propellers, and powered a 24-volt electrical system. While the fuselage was thin-gauge stainless steel, only a portion of the wing was made of the metal; the trailing section of the wing and all control surfaces were fabric-covered.

=== Innovations ===
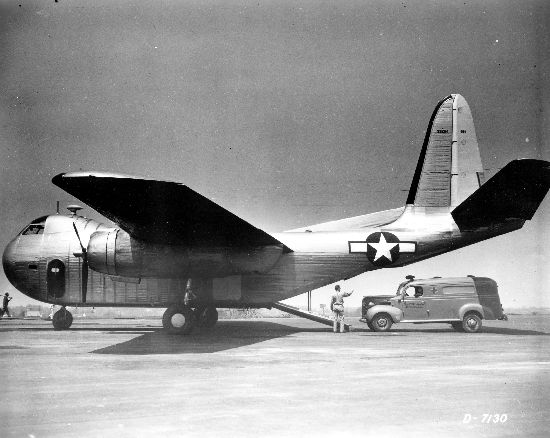
An RB-1 demonstrates its loading ramp

The RB-1/C-93 was radical for its day, introducing many of the features now standard in military transports. The flight deck could accommodate three crew members, pilot and copilot side-by-side, the navigator behind them. Stairs connected the flight deck to the cargo area, which was 25 feet (7.6 m) long with an unobstructed cross-section of 8 × 8 feet (2.4m) throughout its length. Cargo loading and unloading could be accomplished in two ways: through 40 × 60 inch (102 × 152 cm) doors on both sides of the fuselage or by an electrically operated 10 × 8 foot (3.0 × 2.4 m) ramp at the aft end of the cargo area under the upswept tail, a similar development to what had been initially fitted to the Germans' own Ju 290 four-engined transport aircraft as their Trapoklappe ramp in 1939. The RB-1's loading ramp, accessed by manually operated clamshell doors, along with the tricycle landing gear, meant cargo could be loaded/unloaded at truck-bed height. A manually operated two-ton (1814 kg) hoist for unloading trucks and a one-ton winch for pulling cargo up the ramp were also provided in the cargo area. The aircraft could accommodate:

- 24 paratroopers, or
- 24 stretchers and 16 sitting wounded, or
- 9,600 pounds of cargo, or
- a 1½ ton truck, or
- The largest ambulance in use by the U.S. military.

== Operational history ==
The prototype first flew from the Budd Red Lion Factory Airfield in Philadelphia, Pennsylvania on 31 October 1943, piloted by Guy Miller. The prototype had a takeoff run when empty of just 650 feet (200 m), and could carry a maximum payload of 10,400 pounds (4,700 kg) with a takeoff run of 920 feet (280 m). However, the aircraft demonstrated greater than expected fuel consumption; the range with a standard payload was only 700 miles (1,100 km), 650 miles (1,050 km) with a maximum payload. Three prototype aircraft: NX37097, NX41810, and NC45354 were built; one was used for testing radio equipment, while the other two were used for flight test evaluations. During testing, a few aircraft had difficulty with the simultaneous deployment of the right and left landing gear. With the same engines as the C-47, but 3,000 pounds (1,400 kg) heavier (empty), the aircraft was relatively underpowered; it was reportedly said that, for an aircraft built by a railroad car company, it indeed handled like one.

At the Budd factory and airfield in Philadelphia, Pennsylvania, there were construction delays due to cost overruns and problems with stainless steel fabrication. By late 1943, aluminum production had been increased with the construction of new processing facilities, and other more conventional cargo aircraft (such as the Curtiss C-46 Commando and the Douglas C-47 Skytrain) were being produced in large numbers. This caused the Army to cancel its order for the C-93 and the Navy to reduce its RB-1 order from 200 to 25, of which 17 were delivered in March 1944.

On 13 April 1944, during a Naval Air Training Command (NATC) evaluation flight of RB-1 prototype U.S. Navy NX37097 at Patuxent River NAS, Maryland, the aircraft crashed, killing one of the crew. The aircraft was damaged beyond repair and written off, but the pilot reported that the stainless steel construction of the aircraft contributed to saving his life.

Production RB-1 aircraft never entered squadron service with the Navy, but a few were briefly used by Naval Air Stations as utility aircraft. With only 17 aircraft in inventory, the RB-1 was not feasible to maintain on the active list, and it was retired from U.S. Navy service in early 1945. The extant RB-1s were then transferred to the War Assets Administration (WAA) to be sold as war surplus. In 1945, the WAA sold 12 Conestogas to the National Skyway Freight Corp for $28,642 each (equivalent to $394,500 in 2024 dollars) at a time when new C-47s were selling for approximately $100,000 each (equivalent to $1.4 million in 2024 dollars). The new company, founded by members of the AVG Flying Tigers immediately sold four RB-1 aircraft to other buyers, which paid for the entire WAA contract.

The seven remaining National Skyways aircraft were used to transport a variety of cargo, shipping fruit and furniture from its base in Long Beach, California. (Note: The company lost one RB-1 on its initial flight at a crash in Fort Worth, Texas; it was sold for $500 and used as a hamburger stand.) Pilots reported that the Budd transports were temperamental; in particular, exhaust stacks kept falling off and causing engine fires.There were three more crashes of Conestogas while in service with National Skyway Freight, one each in Virginia, New Mexico, and Michigan. (Note: The Michigan crash occurred when a National Skyways RB-1 was forced to make a belly landing in a Detroit graveyard. There were no casualties.) The crash in Virginia was a belly landing at a country club brought on by fuel exhaustion following weather-related problems. The Albuquerque, New Mexico crash was due to a downdraft during a snow storm, 80 miles (130 km) from Albuquerque.<Widow of Lawrence Molloy Feemster, Ruth Mae (Feemster) Hill & preserved newspaper clippings> Pilot and copilot were killed when they were thrown through the windshield and the aircraft skidded over them; the flight engineer survived.

In 1947, the U.S. Army (and later the U.S. Air Force) gave National Skyway Freight a large contract for trans-Pacific freight, for which it leased military aircraft. The company changed its name to Flying Tiger and replaced the RB-1s with C-47s for its U.S. freight routes; the RB-1s were sold off to other buyers. One of these aircraft, a prototype RB-1, "NC45354" was sold to the Tucker Motor Company to transport its demonstration 1948 Tucker Sedan to auto shows around the U.S.; it was reportedly later abandoned at an airfield in Oakland, California after repeated mechanical troubles.

=== Brazil ===
A Brazilian regional airline, VASD (Viação Aérea Santos Dumont), which commenced operations on 18 January 1944, with a Budd RB.1 Conestoga and two Catalinas – all formerly owned by a rubber corporation.

The Conestoga (civil registration PP-SDC), was named Tio Sam ("Uncle Sam"). After a crash landing on 4 January 1947, with the undercarriage partially lowered, at Campo dos Afonsos, it was written off and scrapped.

== Surviving aircraft ==
RB-1 at the Pima Air Museum

A single unrestored Budd RB-1, BuNo 39307, is on display at the Pima Air & Space Museum in Tucson, Arizona.

== Specifications (RB-1) ==
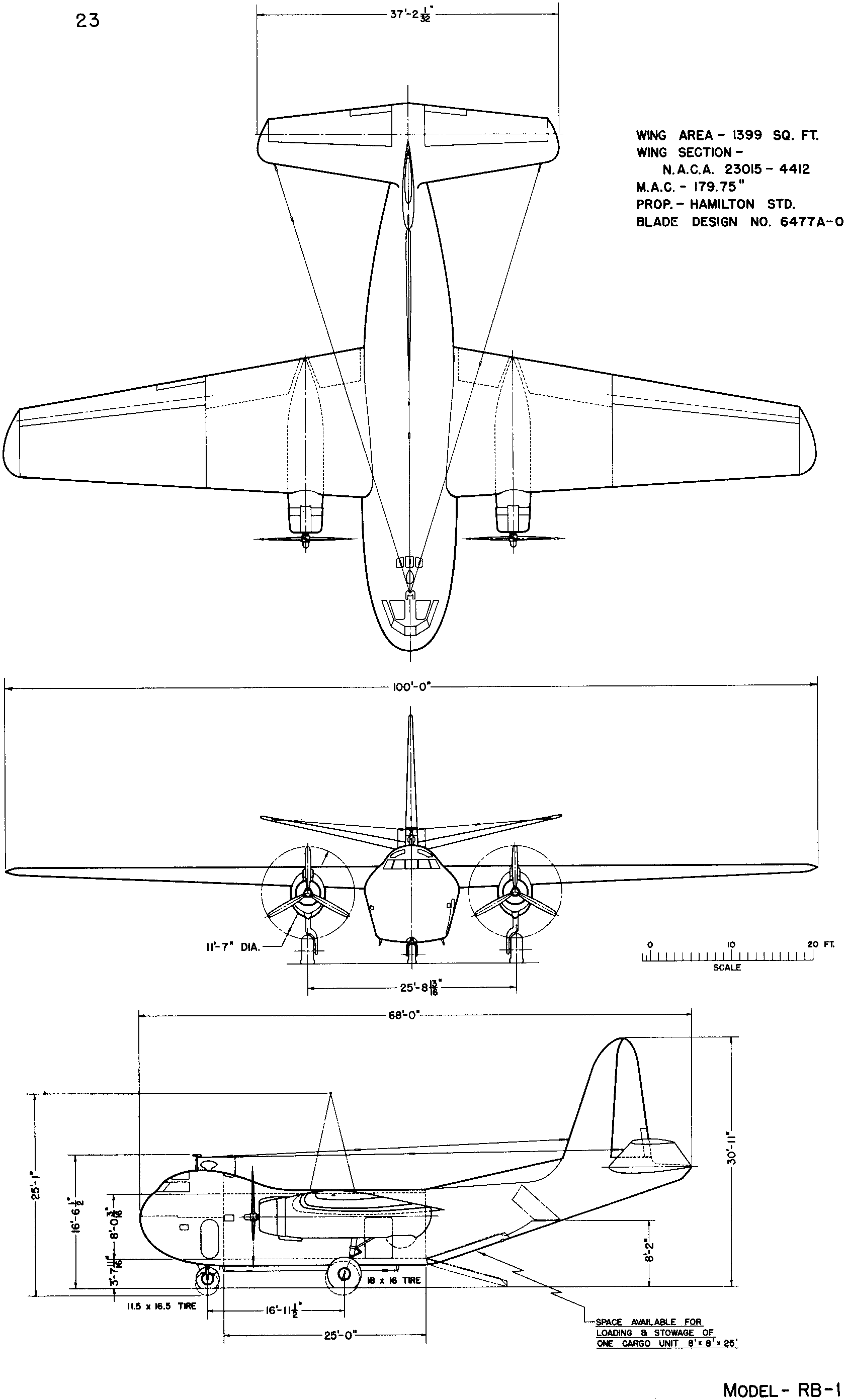
3-view line drawing of the Budd RB-1 Conestoga

Data from Jane's fighting aircraft of World War II

General characteristics

- Crew: 3
- Capacity: 9,600 lb (4,400 kg) of payload with 390 US gal (320 imp gal; 1,500 L) of fuel
- Length: 68 ft (21 m)
- Wingspan: 100 ft (30 m)
- Height: 31 ft 9 in (9.68 m)
- Wing area: 1,400 sq ft (130 m^{2})
- Empty weight: 20,156 lb (9,143 kg)
- Gross weight: 33,860 lb (15,359 kg)
- Fuel capacity: 994 US gal (828 imp gal; 3,760 L) in three wing tanks
- Powerplant: 2 × Pratt & Whitney R-1830-92 Twin Wasp 14-cylinder air-cooled radial engines, 1,200 hp (890 kW) each
- Propellers: 3-bladed Hamilton Standard Hydromatic, 11 ft 7 in (3.53 m) diameter constant-speed fully feathering propellers

Performance

- Maximum speed: 197 mph (317 km/h, 171 kn) at 7,500 ft (2,300 m)
- Cruise speed: 165 mph (266 km/h, 143 kn)
- Stall speed: 78 mph (126 km/h, 68 kn) fully loaded
- Range: 700 mi (1,100 km, 610 nmi) normal
- Maximum economical range: 1,620 mi (1,410 nmi; 2,610 km)

== See also ==
- Fleetwings BT-12 Sophomore also a stainless steel design
- Curtiss-Wright C-76 Caravan
- List of aircraft of World War II
- List of military aircraft of the United States
- List of United States Navy aircraft designations (pre-1962)
