= Lockheed L-1049 Super Constellation =

US airliner with 4 piston engines, 1951

L-1049 Super Constellation
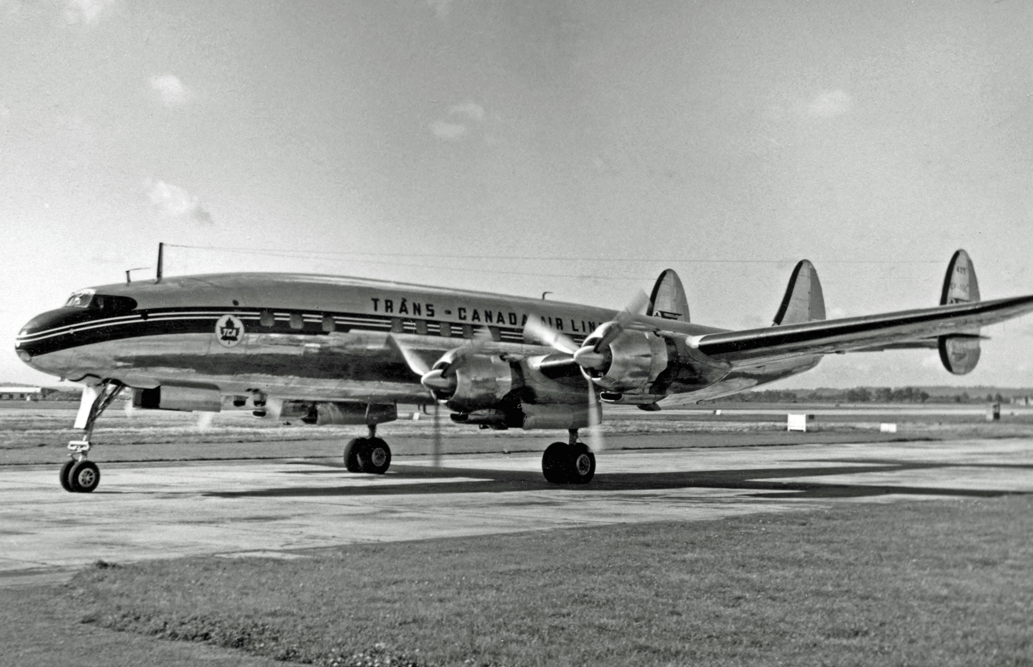
- A L-1049C of Trans-Canada Air Lines at London Heathrow Airport in 1954

General information
- Type: Airliner
- National origin: United States
- Manufacturer: Lockheed Corporation
- Status: Retired from commercial operation; at least one preserved example flying as private aircraft
- Primary users: Eastern Air Lines Trans World Airlines; Air France
- Number built: 259 (Commercial); 320 (Military)

History
- Manufactured: 1951–1958
- Introduction date: 15 December 1951
- First flight: 14 July 1951
- Retired: 1982, US Navy
- Developed from: Lockheed L-049 Constellation
- Variants: Lockheed C-121 Constellation; Lockheed EC-121 Warning Star
- Developed into: Lockheed L-1249 Super Constellation; Lockheed L-1649 Starliner

The Lockheed L-1049 Super Constellation is an American long-range airliner and a member of the Lockheed Constellation family. It was one of the most successful and widely used variants of the Constellation series, and was colloquially referred to as the "Super Connie."

The L-1049 was Lockheed's response to the successful Douglas DC-6 airliner, first flying in 1950. The aircraft was produced for both the United States Navy as the WV / R7V and U.S. Air Force as the C-121 for transport, electronics, and airborne early warning and control aircraft.

== Development ==
Beginning in 1943, Lockheed planned stretched variants of the Constellation family. The first was the L-049 with a fuselage lengthened by 13 feet (4.0 meters) and the second the L-749 stretched 18 feet (5.5 meters).

Douglas launched a stretched version of its DC-6 airliner as a cargo transport, designated DC-6A, for both military and civilian operators. Douglas was soon to launch a passenger version (the DC-6B) of this new aircraft. The DC-6B could carry 23 more passengers than Lockheed's current production L-749 Constellation.

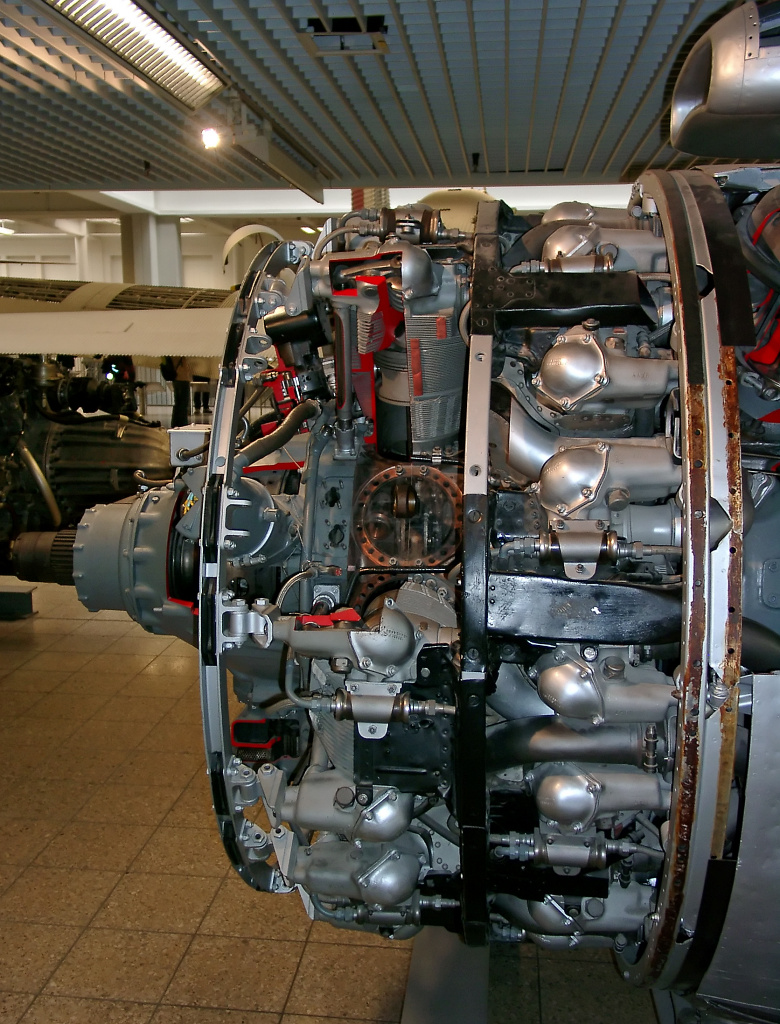
The Wright R-3350 Turbo-compound engine used on later models of the L-1049

In 1950, Lockheed had repurchased the XC-69 Constellation prototype from the Hughes Tool Company. The XC-69 was equipped with four Pratt & Whitney R-2800 radial engines instead of the Wright R-3350s used on production models. Lockheed had installed R-2800s on the prototype to test them as an option for the L-049. Lockheed stretched XC-69 by 18 ft (5.5 m), to become the basis for the L-1049 Super Constellation. The aircraft first flew in 1950, still fitted with R-2800 engines. It was then fitted with R-3350 956-C18CA-1 engines with jet stacks for slightly increased thrust.

Later modifications included strengthened landing gear and larger vertical stabilizers. Eastern Air Lines ordered 10 aircraft, while Trans World Airlines (TWA) followed with an order for 14. The L-1049 had some 550 improvements and modifications compared to the L-749, including greater fuel capacity, rectangular windows, larger cockpit windshields, and improved heating and pressurization.

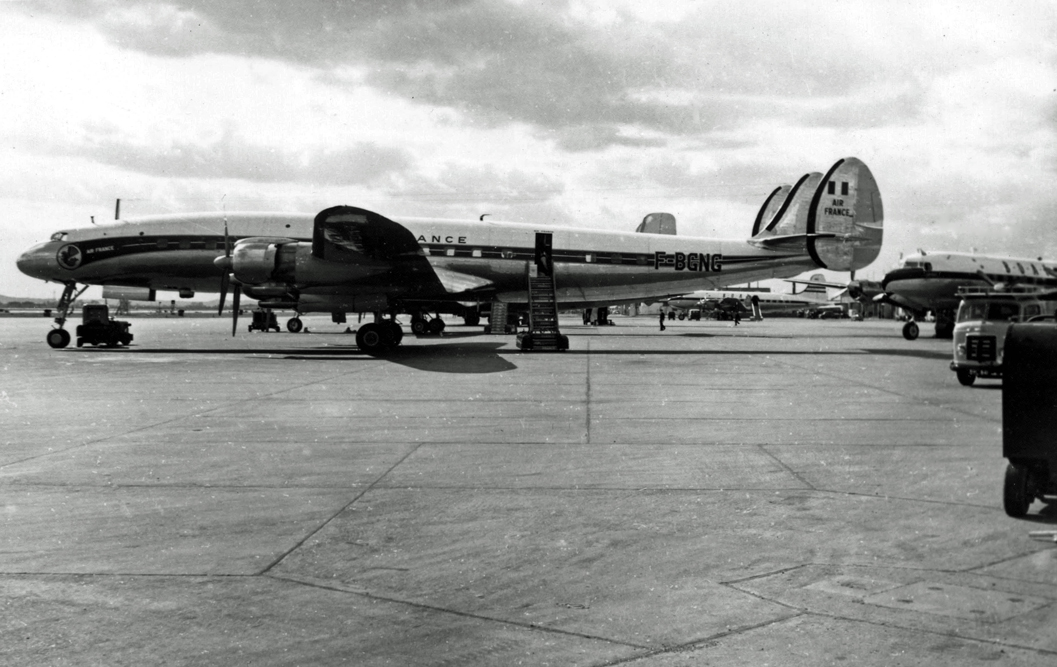
An Air France L-1049C at London Heathrow Airport, 1955

In 1953, R-3350 Turbo-Compound engines became available for civil use. Lockheed incorporated them into the L-1049C, which first flew on February 17 of that year. The R-3350-972-TC18DA-1 turbo-compound engines on the L-1049C used a new turbine system, the Power Recovery Turbine (PRT) system. Each engine used three Power Recovery Turbines to extract the velocity component of the exhaust stream, rather than relying on exhaust expansion, and return the recovered energy mechanically to the crankshaft, increasing power by 550 hp (410 kW) without increasing fuel consumption and with no appreciable backpressure. One notable effect of the PRT installation was the visible exhaust flame, especially at night, caused by rich high-power operation and the concentrated discharge from the turbine exhaust outlets. Protective shielding and other detail changes were used to prevent heat damage to the nearby structure. The L-1049C had a higher cruising speed and climb rate.

Compared with the DC-6B, the L-1049C offered broadly comparable cruise performance, greater payload capability, and longer published range. The wings of the new model were strengthened, cabin soundproofing was increased, and the landing-gear retraction system was improved. A new series of interior layouts was offered: "Siesta" (47 passengers with increased luxury), "Intercontinental" (54–60 passengers), and "Inter-urban" (105 passengers). Each layout included reading lights at every seat. Forty-eight L-1049Cs were built and used by Eastern, TWA, Air France, KLM, Trans-Canada Air Lines, Qantas, Air India, Pakistan International Airlines, Avianca, Iberia, Línea Aeropostal Venezolana, and Cubana de Aviación.

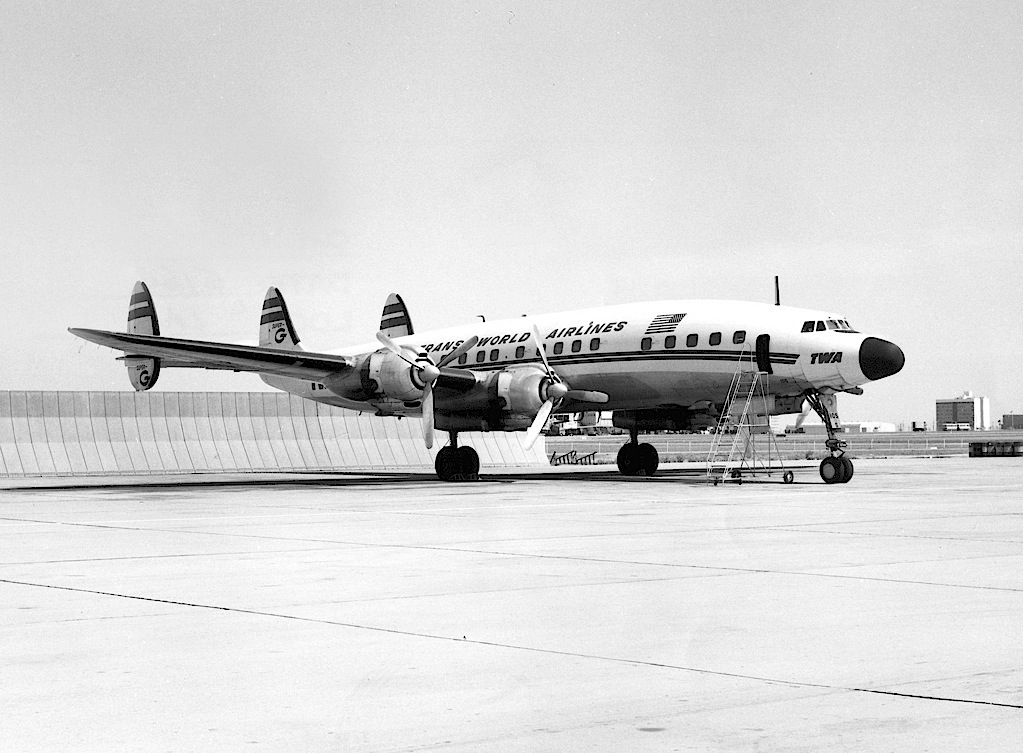
A Trans World Airlines L-1049G at Los Angeles International Airport, 1964

A freighter version, the L-1049D, first flew in August 1954. It had two cargo doors on the left side and a reinforced floor, as used on the R7V-1 military variant of the L-1049B. The L-1049D could carry a 36,916 lb (16,745 kg) payload and had a cargo volume of 5,579 ft^{3} (158.0 m^{3}). Four were produced, all delivered to Seaboard & Western Airlines. Two of the four L-1049D aircraft were later converted to L-1049H standard.

The L-1049E was more successful; 28 were delivered to eight airlines. The L-1049E was essentially an L-1049C with the increased takeoff and landing weights of the L-1049D. The L-1049C and L-1049E could not usually fly from Europe to New York nonstop against prevailing winds. Lockheed addressed this limitation with the L-1049G, which used the L-1049C as its base and fitted more powerful R-3350-972-TC18DA-3 turbo-compound engines. The aircraft could carry 71 to 95 passengers at a speed of 331 mph (533 km/h).

Wingtip tanks with a total capacity of 1,037 US gal (3,930 L; 863 imp gal) were incorporated, increasing range by 1,110 miles (1,790 km). A new Bendix or RCA weather radar could be installed in the nose, changing the shape of the nose cone. New Hamilton Standard or Curtiss Electric propellers were also offered. This new version of the L-1049, with more than 100 modifications from the L-1049C, was unveiled as the L-1049G; the L-1049F designation was already in use for the military C-121C. More than 100 L-1049G aircraft were ordered by sixteen airlines. The L-1049G first flew on December 17, 1954, and entered service with TWA and Northwest in 1955. The nickname "Super G", first used by TWA, was later adopted for the L-1049G.

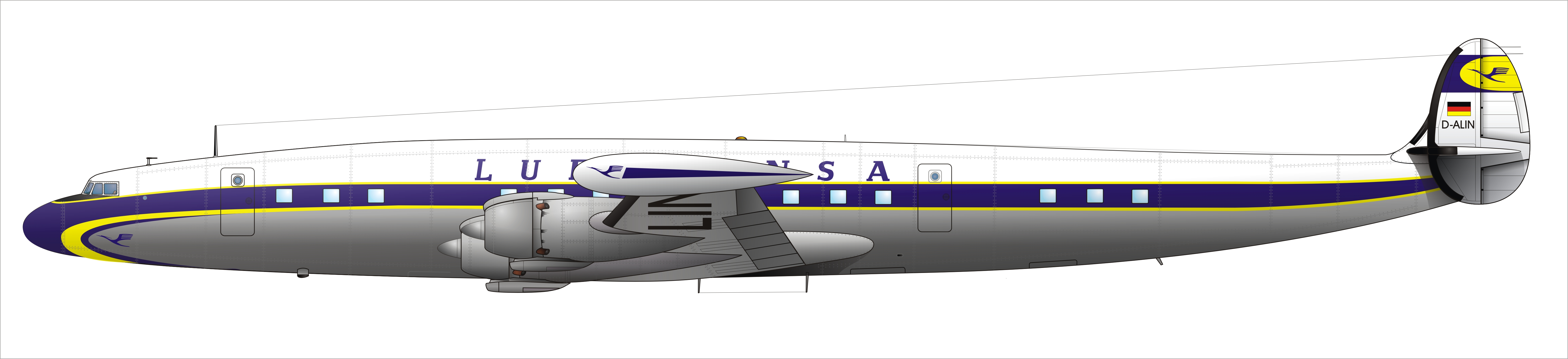
An artist's rendition of a Lufthansa L-1049G

The L-1049H was called the "Super H" and "Husky". It was a convertible passenger/freight aircraft, mating a C-121C-based fuselage with L-1049G components. The aircraft could carry up to 120 people with seats, luggage lockers, and toilets installed, along with the option of decorating the cabin walls. When not in use, the luggage lockers and seats could be stowed in the lower hold. The aircraft entered service with Qantas in 1956.

Some later-production L-1049G and L-1049H aircraft were fitted with the TC-18EA series engines used on the L-1649 Starliner. A final variant, known as the L-1049J, was planned in 1957. Powered by four R-3350-988-TC-18EA-6 engines, the L-1049J was based on the L-1049H, with the wings of the R7V-2 Constellation and an extra fuselage-mounted fuel tank.

== Operational history ==
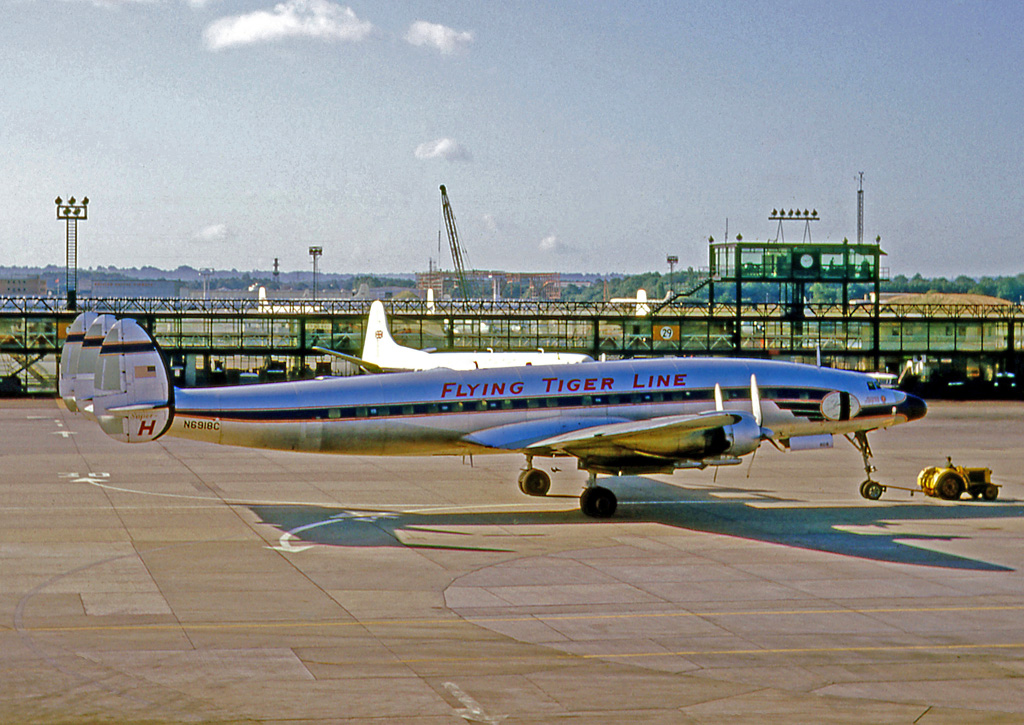
L-1049H convertible aircraft of Flying Tiger Line operating a passenger charter flight from London Gatwick Airport, 1964

The first production L-1049 flew on July 14, 1951, and received certification in November 1951. The Turbo-compound versions of the R-3350 engine were not yet available for civil use, so the engines were 2,700–2,800 hp (2,000–2,100 kW) instead of the Turbo-compound's 3,250–3,400 hp (2,420–2,540 kW). The aircraft entered service with Eastern Air Lines in December 1951, flying from Miami to New York. Eastern later operated the L-1049C and L-1049G. TWA 1049s began flying in 1952; TWA L-1049Gs flew transatlantic starting in 1955. In 1956, a TWA L-1049 collided with a United Airlines DC-7 over the Grand Canyon, leading to the deaths of all on both aircraft.

KLM introduced the L-1049C on the Amsterdam to New York run in 1953. It also used L-1049Gs to Tokyo and Sydney. Air France used its L-1049Cs across the Atlantic. Seaboard & Western Airlines used L-1049Ds on transatlantic cargo flights to Germany and Switzerland. From the summer of 1955 to the spring of 1956, the British Overseas Airways Corporation (BOAC) leased three Seaboard L-1049Ds for passenger flights. Northwest Orient Airlines L-1049Gs flew Seattle, Washington to Tokyo, Okinawa and Manila in 1955–57. The scheduled freight airline, Flying Tiger Line, used the L-1049H on North American routes and service for the Military Air Transport Service. A Flying Tigers L-1049H was the last Constellation built in 1959.

The first airline in Latin America with Super Constellations (L-1049E and L-1049G) was Cubana de Aviación, flying them from Havana to Madrid, New York City, and Mexico City. Other Latin American Super Constellations were on Línea Aeropostal Venezolana, Avianca, Real Transportes Aéreos, and Varig.

Iberia 1049Gs continued to fly Madrid-Santa Maria-Havana weekly until 1966.

Most Super Constellations were retired by their original operators after the advent of the Boeing 707 and Douglas DC-8; the last passenger L1049 flight in the US was an Eastern shuttle EWR-DCA in February 1968. The last commercial flight of the L-1049 Super Constellation was in 1993, when the Federal Aviation Administration banned all airlines from the Dominican Republic that flew Constellations to the United States (due to safety concerns). The Dominican airlines were the last operators of any version of the Constellation.

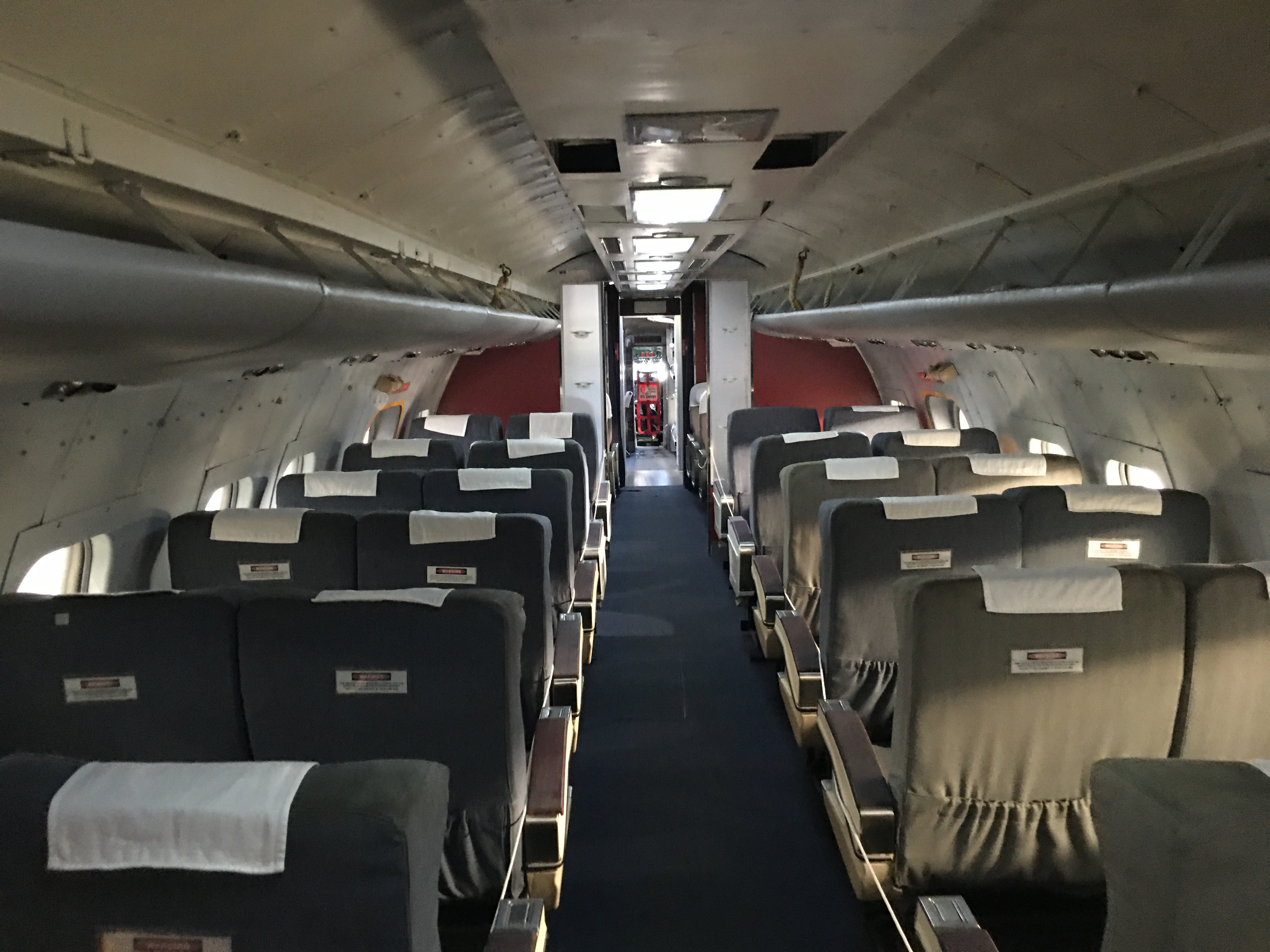
The cabin of a preserved Qantas Super Constellation, 2022

Numerous military versions were operated by the United States Navy and United States Air Force as transports and AWACS platforms. The WV-1 Navy version was used during the Cold War with picket ships on the DEW (Distant Early Warning) lines, one east and one west. These lines were to give early warning of an attack by the USSR. The east line was from Halifax, NS, to the Canary Islands and back. The west line was from Hawaii to Midway Island, then up to the Aleutians and back. The flights would last up to 14 hours or more. These aircraft served in the Vietnam War in several roles, including transmitting television programs from the United States for the troops on the ground, and observing the Ho Chi Minh Trail. One of them was shot down by North Korean aircraft in 1969.

The last model of Super Constellation produced was the Lockheed EC-121 Warning Star, developed for the United States military. Many of these aircraft survive today.

The Indian Air Force and Indian Navy used former Air India L-1049C, E, and G versions converted by Hindustan Aeronautics Limited for use as Sea Air and Rescue aircraft. They first formed a part of the No. 6 Squadron IAF, with 7 units beign used as Maritime Patrol aircraft and Two as frieghters. They were used during Operation Vijay and the 1962 Sino-Indian war. Five of them were transferred to INAS 312 on November 18, 1976. They were retired between 1981 and 1983 and replaced by Tupolev Tu-142 aircraft. India was the last military operator of the Constellation.

== Variants ==
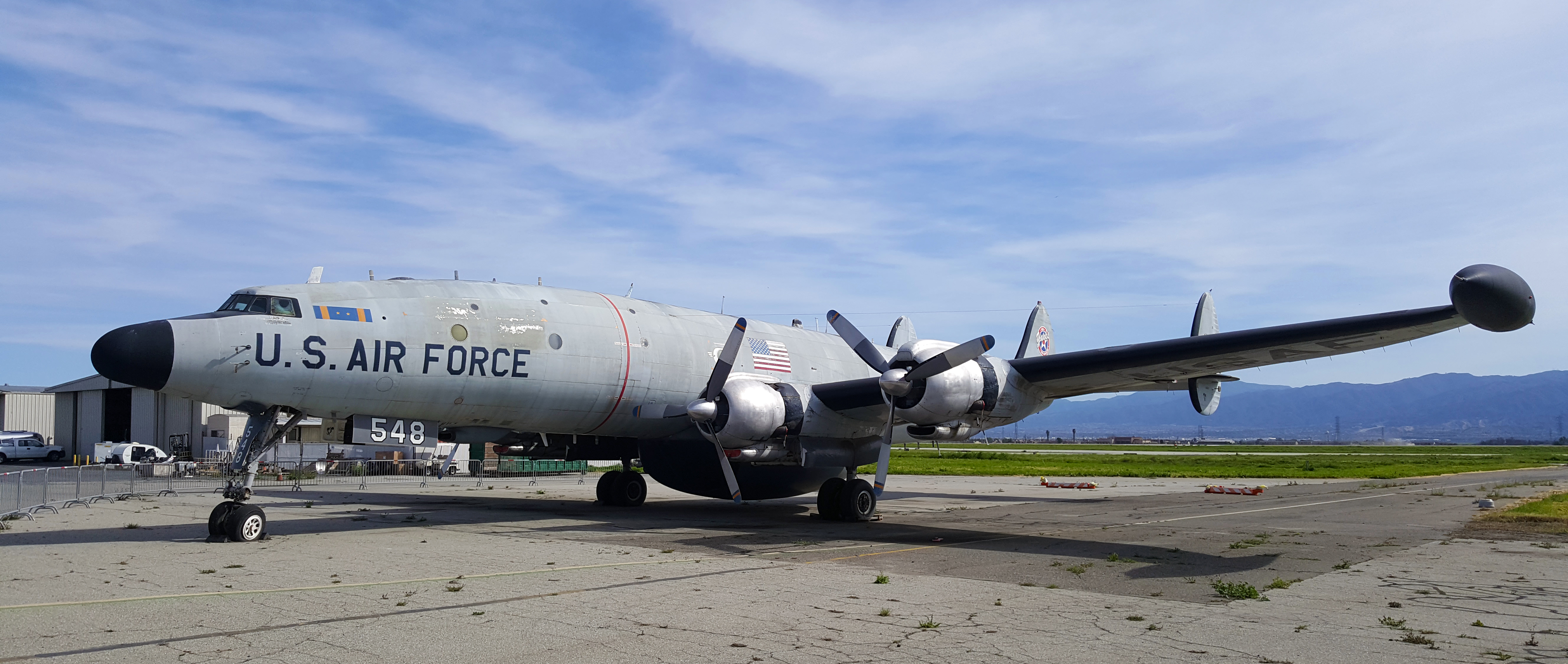
Lockheed 1049A Super Constellation (EC-121T) 1049A-55-86 N548GF Date Taken on 3 March 2017, 14:08:54

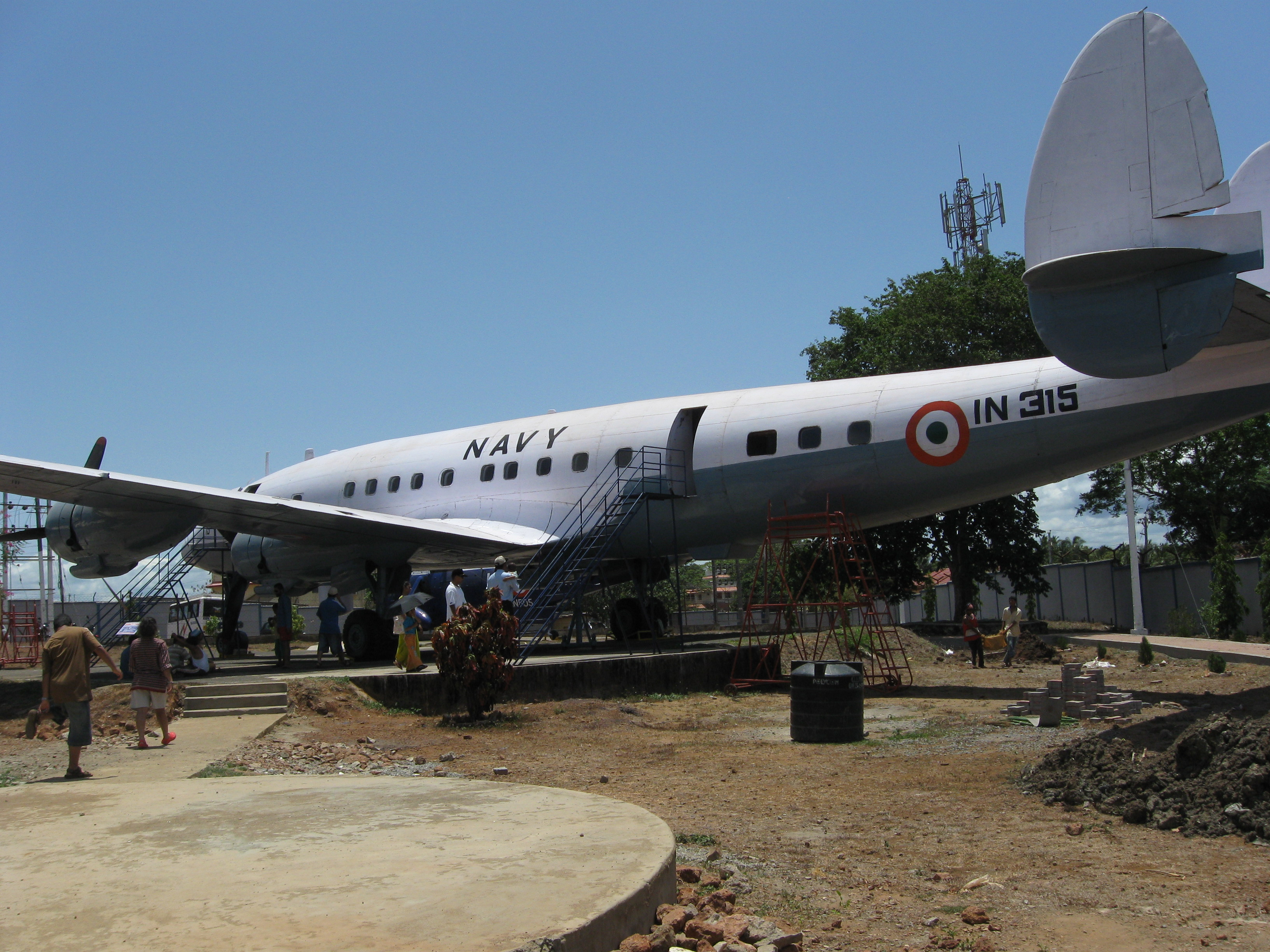
An L-1049G of the Indian Navy at the Naval Aviation Museum in India, 2008

=== Civilian ===
L-1049
Initial production version. 24 built.
L-1049C
Civil version of L-1049B, powered by four R-3350 972-TC-18DA-1 Turbo-compound engines. 48 built.
L-1049D
All-freight version constructed for Seaboard & Western Airlines with the same powerplants as the L-1049C. Four built.
L-1049E
Passenger version of L-1049D. 28 built.
L-1049G
L-1049C with an increased MTOW and four R-3350 972-TC-18DA-3 engines. The options of tip tanks and weather radar were available.
L-1049G/01
Version built for Varig with a strengthened wing, increased MTOW and R-3350 988-TC-18EA-3 engines.
L-1049H
Convertible passenger/freight version of the L-1049G. 53 built.
L-1049H/01
Version built for the Flying Tiger Line with increased MTOW and powered by R-3350 988-TC-18EA-3 engines.
L-1049H/02
Different landing gear and R-3350 988-TC-18EA-6 engines. Two built.
L-1049H/07
Similar to the L-1049H/02. Two built.
L-1049J
Proposed version of the L-1049H/02 with a lengthened wingspan and an extra fuel tank.
L-1149
Proposed version of the L-1049G and L-1049H to be powered by Allison 501D turboprop engines.
L-1449
Proposed turboprop version of L-1049G with a stretched fuselage and a new wing.
L-1549
Planned stretched version of L-1449.

=== Military ===
L-1049A
Manufacturer's designation for the WV-2, WV-3 and RC-121D.
L-1049B
Manufacturer's designation for the R7V-1, RC-121C and VC-121E.
L-1049F
Manufacturer's designation for the C-121C with strengthened Landing Gear.
EC-121 College Eye
AEW&C aircraft used in the Vietnam War.

== Surviving aircraft ==
- L-1049F Super Constellation c/n 4176 VH-EAG airworthy with the Historic Aircraft Restoration Society in Albion Park Rail, New South Wales. It received an Engineering Heritage Marker from Engineers Australia.
- L 1049A Super Constellation c/n 4363 1049A-55-86 N548GF on static display at Yanks Air Museum, Chino Airport, Chino, California.
- L-1049G Super Constellation c/n 4519 F-BGNJ on static display, outside Nantes Atlantique Airport, France.
- L-1049C Super Constellation c/n 4544 CF-TGE in Trans-Canada Airlines livery, on static display outside the Museum of Flight, Seattle, USA.
- L-1049G Super Constellation c/n 4603 D-ALEM on static display, Lufthansa Group's Hangar One at Frankfurt Airport, Germany. Built in 1955, served in Lufthansa.
- L-1049G Super Constellation c/n 4604 D-ALIN on static display, Flugausstellung Peter Junior in Hermeskeil, Germany. The Super Constellation was used by the delegation of the Federal Republic of Germany during Adenauer's state visit to Moscow in 1955.
- L-1049G Super Constellation c/n 4614 IN315 on static display, Naval Aviation Museum (Goa).
- L-1049G Super Constellation c/n 4626 F-BHBG on static display, outside the nightclub Le Moulin, Le Juch France.

== Specifications (L-1049C) ==
3-view line drawing of the Lockheed L-1049A Super Constellation

Data from Lockheed Constellation:From Excalibur to Starliner.

General characteristics

- Crew: 5 (Pilot, Copilot, Navigator, Flight Engineer, Radio Operator)
- Capacity: 47-106 Passengers
- Length: 113 ft 7 in (34.62 m)
- Wingspan: 123 ft (37 m)
- Height: 24 ft 9 in (7.54 m)
- Wing area: 1,650 sq ft (153 m^{2})
- Airfoil: root: NACA 23018; tip: NACA 4412
- Empty weight: 69,000 lb (31,298 kg)
- Max takeoff weight: 120,000 lb (54,431 kg)
- Powerplant: 4 × Wright R-3350 972-TC-18DA-1 Duplex-Cyclone 18-cylinder air-cooled radial piston turbo-compounded engine, 3,250 hp (2,420 kW) each (takeoff); maximum continuous power 2,600 hp
- Propellers: 3-bladed Hamilton Standard Hydromatic 43H60, 16 ft 10 in (5.13 m) diameter constant-speed fully-feathering Duralumin propellers

Performance

- Maximum speed: 330 mph (530 km/h, 290 kn)
- Cruise speed: 304 mph (489 km/h, 264 kn)
- Range: 5,150 mi (8,290 km, 4,480 nmi)
- Service ceiling: 25,700 ft (7,800 m)

== Gallery ==
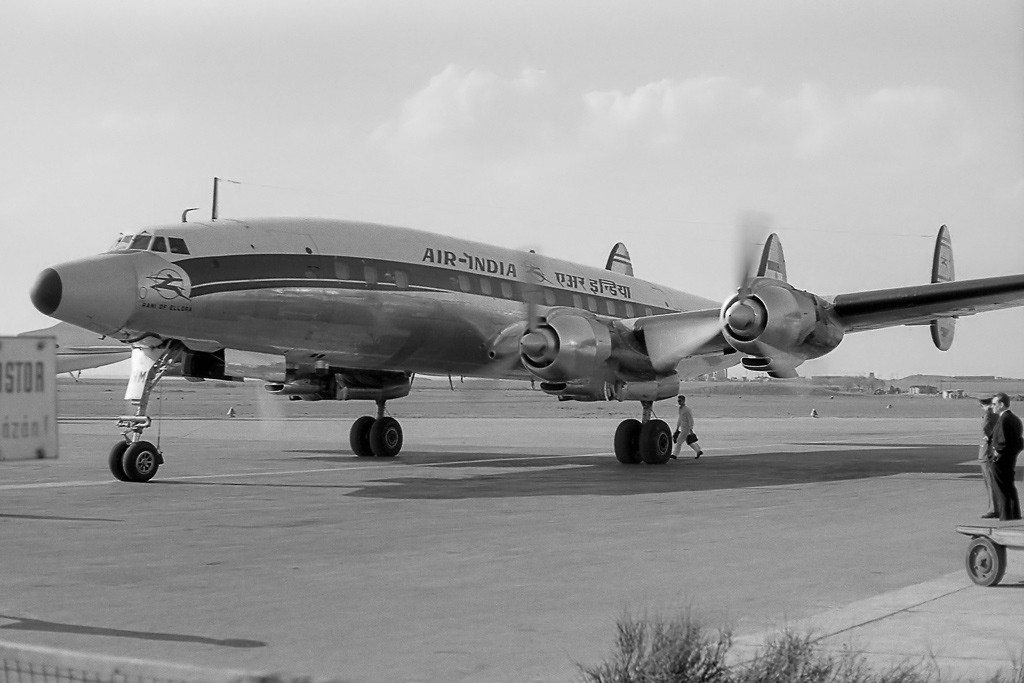
Air India was the earliest Asia-based operator of a large Super Constellation fleet. Shown is one of their L-1049Gs at Prague Airport, 1961

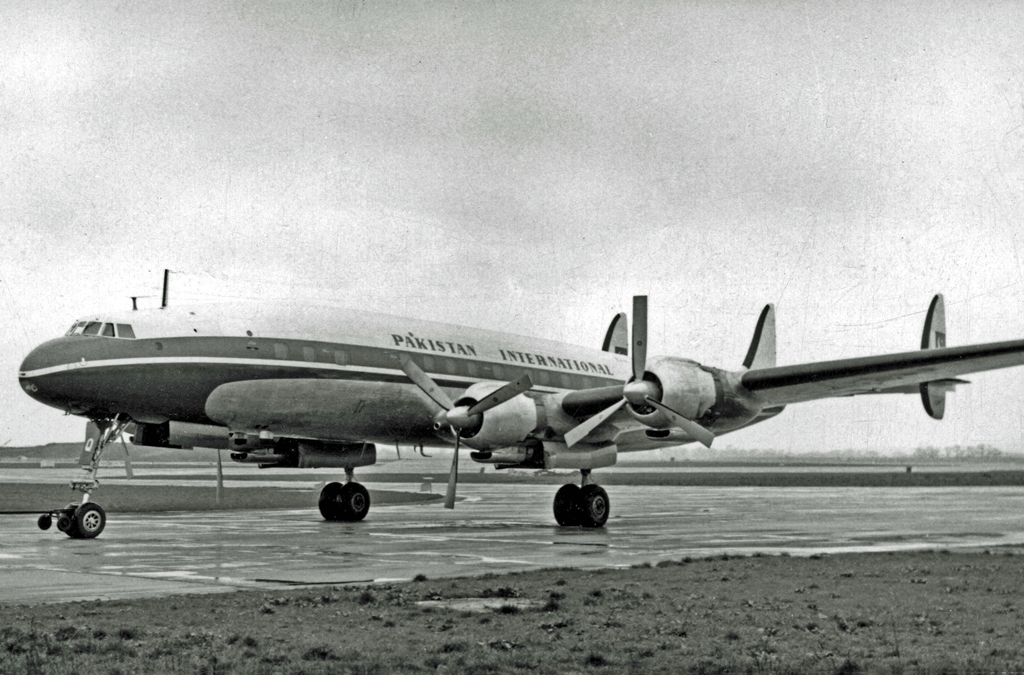
A Pakistan International Airlines Super Constellation at Heathrow Airport, 1955. The airline was one of the first airlines in Asia to operate the type

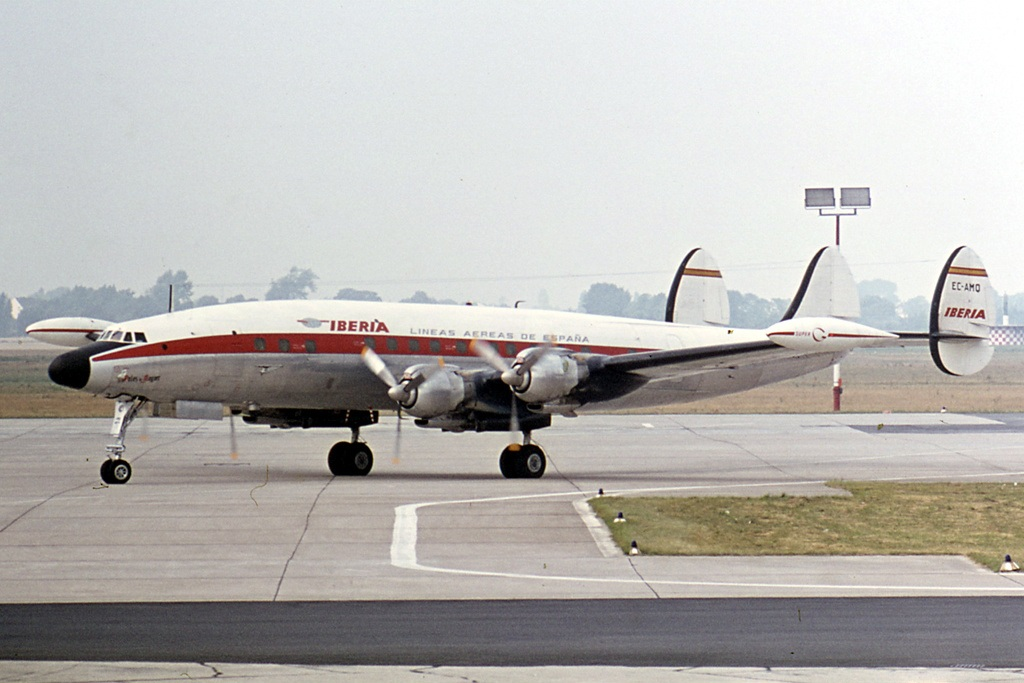
An Iberia L-1049G at Düsseldorf Airport, 1964

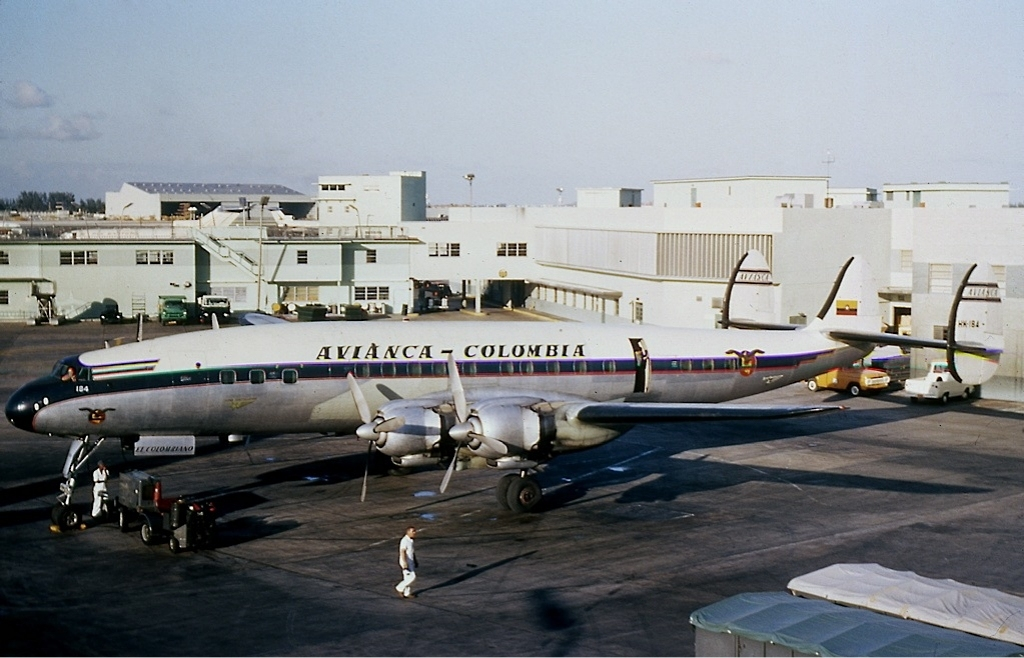
An Avianca L-1049G at Miami International Airport, February 1965

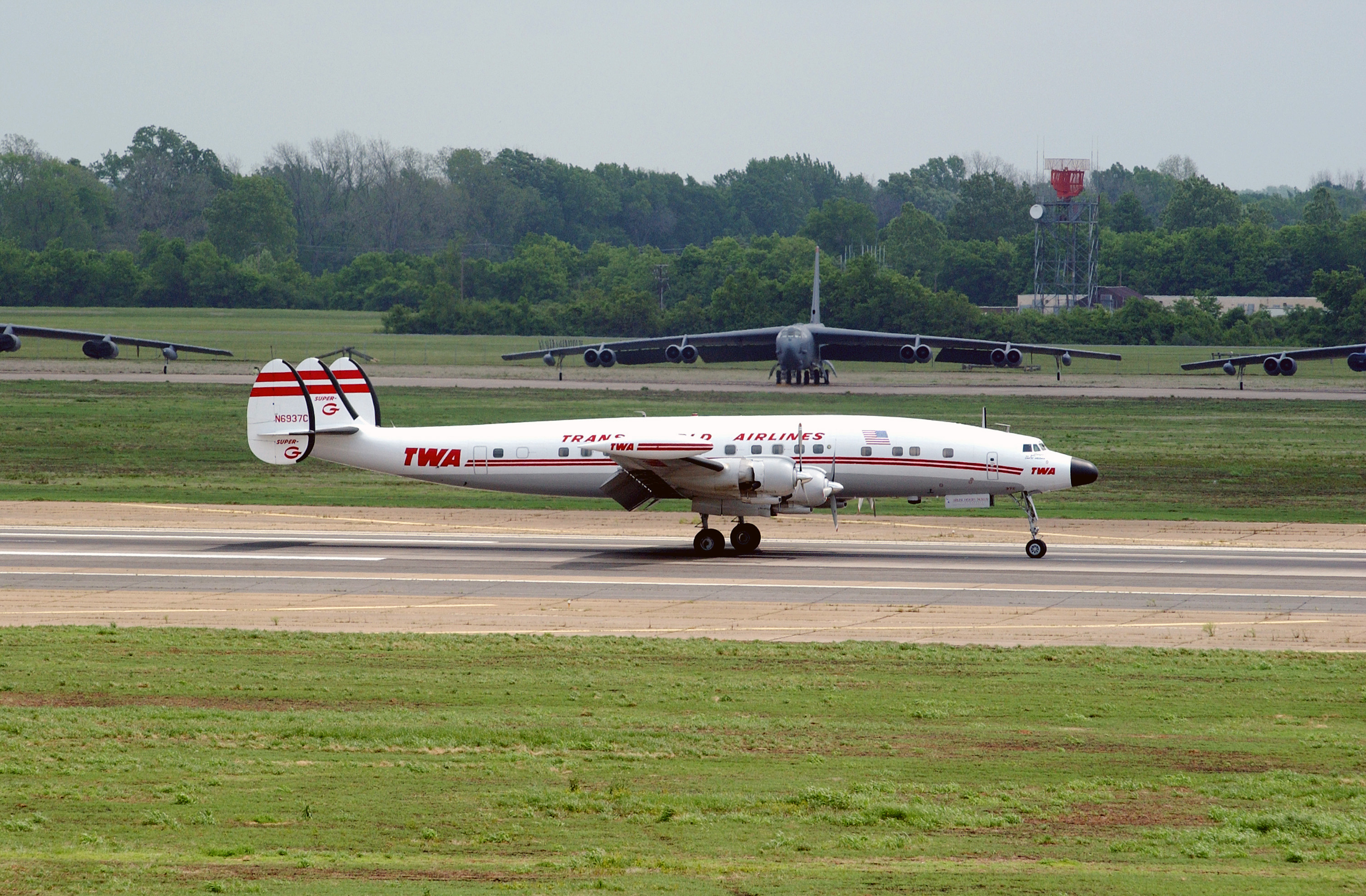
A restored L-1049H of the National Airline History Museum (previously Save-A-Connie) in full Trans World Airlines colors, 2004

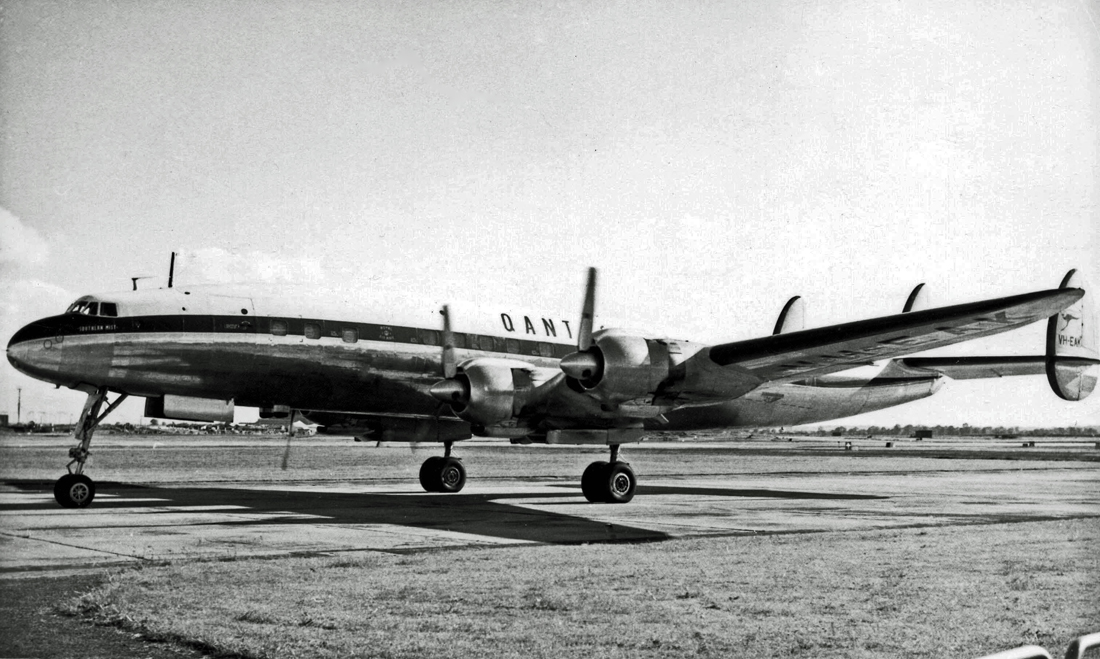
A Qantas Super Constellation at Heathrow, 1955

== See also ==
Related development

- Lockheed Constellation – Family of US airliners with 4 piston engines, 1943
- Lockheed L-049 Constellation – US airliner with 4 piston engines, 1943
- Lockheed C-69 Constellation – Early military version of the Constellation
- Lockheed L-649 Constellation – US airliner with 4 piston engines, 1946
- Lockheed L-749 Constellation – First version of Constellation with the ability to cross the Atlantic non-stop
- Lockheed C-121/R7V Constellation – Military transport version of Constellation
- Lockheed EC-121 Warning Star – Airborne early warning and control aircraft based on the Constellation airframe
- Lockheed L-1249 Super Constellation – Experimental four-engine turboprop military transport
- Lockheed L-1649A Starliner – US airliner with 4 piston engines, 1956

Aircraft of comparable role, configuration, and era

- Boeing 377 Stratocruiser – US airliner with 4 piston engines, 1947
- Bristol Britannia – British four-engined turboprop airliner, 1952
- Douglas DC-6 – US airliner with 4 piston engines, 1946
- Douglas DC-7 – US airliner with 4 piston engines, 1953
- Ilyushin Il-18 – Soviet medium- to long-range airliner with 4 turboprop engines, 1957
- Lockheed L-188 Electra – American turboprop airliner, built 1957–1961
- Vickers Viscount – British four-engined medium-range turboprop airliner, 1948

Related lists

- List of Lockheed aircraft
- List of models of the Lockheed Constellation
- List of Lockheed Constellation operators

== Bibliography ==
- Breffort, Dominique. Lockheed Constellation: from Excalibur to Starliner Civilian and Military Variants. Paris: Histoire and Collecions, 2006. Print. ISBN 2-915239-62-2
- Tariel, Yves (May 2008). "Record du monde: La céleste ponte du "Super Constellation"" [World Record: The Celestial Bridge of the "Super Constellation"]. Le Fana de l'Aviation (in French) (462): 68–73. ISSN 0757-4169.
