= Yue Yiqin =

Chinese military aviator (1914–1937)

- 樂以琴
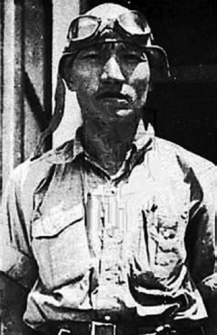
- Born: Yue Yizhong (Chinese: 樂以忠); November 11, 1914; Lushan, Sichuan, First Republic of China
- Died: December 3, 1937 (aged 23); Nanking, Republican China
- Relatives: Yue Fei (distant ancestor)
- Military career
- Allegiance: (Taiwan) Republic of China
- Branch: Republic of China Air Force
- Service years: 1931–37
- Rank: Major (posthumous)
- Units: 22nd PS/4th PG; 21st PS/4th PG
- Commands: 21st PS/4th PG
- Conflicts: Second Sino-Japanese War: Battle of Shanghai; Battle of Nanking †
- Awards: Five Star Medal

Yue Yiqin (or Yue Yi-chin, Chinese: 樂以琴; pinyin: Yuè Yǐqín; Wade–Giles: Yüeh I-ch'in; November 11, 1914 – December 3, 1937) was a flying ace of the Republic of China during the Second Sino-Japanese War. He achieved five confirmed aerial victories until his death in combat during the Battle of Nanking. Notably, his family claimed to descend from Yue Fei, a Chinese general and folk hero who had lived during the Song dynasty.

Together with Gao Zhihang, Liu Cuigang and Li Guidan, Yue was considered to be one of the "Four Heroes of the Chinese Air Force".

== Biography ==
Yue was born 1914 in Lushan County, Sichuan as Yue Yizhong (Chinese: 樂以忠; pinyin: Yuè Yǐzhōng; Wade–Giles: Yüeh I-chung). His family was Baptist Christian, having been evangelized by H. J. Openshaw around 1900, an American Baptist missionary stationed at Ya'an (Yachow-fu) at the time. His father Yue Boying was an owner of hookah shops and tea houses who ran a booming business in Lushan, Ya'an, and Chengdu. His mother Qiu Fu was a Tibetan from Dartsedo, daughter of a head of achak khapa (i.e. trading houses; Ch. guozhuang). Yue attended West China Union Senior High School (affiliated to West China Union University) after graduating from Private Mingde Junior High School. Both academically as well as athletically gifted, he competed for the Sichuan Province track team as a sprinter in the National Games while he was in high school. After graduation, he wanted to study medicine at the Cheeloo University in Jinan, but for unknown reasons had no academic certificate from his high school. As result, he borrowed the name of his elder brother, "Yue Yiqin", to enroll at the university and from then on lived under that name. Yue dropped his medical studies when Japan invaded Manchuria in 1931, and instead joined the Central Aviation Academy. After graduation, Yue first served with the 8th PS (Pursuit Squadron), then became an instructor at the Academy, and finally joined 22nd PS/4th PG (Pursuit Group) as flight leader and Lieutenant.

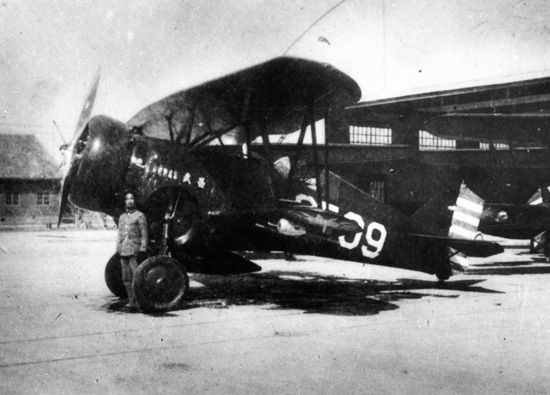
Yue flew a Hawk III, like the one shown here, that was numbered 2204.

Yue claimed his first aerial victories on 15 August 1937 during the Battle of Shanghai, when the 22nd PS/4th PG encountered a group of Mitsubishi B2Ms of the Imperial Japanese Navy fleet aircraft carrier Kaga; Yue reportedly participated in the destruction of four B2Ms with his Hawk III fighter no. 2204. (Note: According to Stephen Howarth, the 22nd PS/4th PG encountered 12 B2Ms, destroying eleven. In contrast, Raymond Cheung stated that the unit battled 8 B2Ms, shooting down 7.)

On 21 August, the Chinese Airforce launched a bombing raid against the Japanese airfield at the Kunda Textile Factory in Shanghai. As the Chinese Northrop Gamma 2CE attack bombers approached their target, however, they were separated from their escorts and intercepted by IJNAS Nakajima E8N floatplanes. Forced to break off the attack, the bombers attempted to flee, but were pursued by the Japanese. A dogfight ensued, into which ten nearby Chinese Hawk IIIs soon intervened; among these fighters was Yue. He was the only one to shoot down one of the floatplanes, though the Japanese pilot, Shigeru Yano, managed to survive by ditching his E8N in the Huangpu River. Probably as a result of the dogfight's confusion, Yano later mistakenly reported that he had successfully rammed and thus destroyed the Hawk III that had attacked him; Yue however returned to his base unharmed.

Yue claimed his next aerial victory one month later, on 20 September, as he participated in a mission to intercept two large groups of Japanese airplanes near Nanking. Yue once again flew his Hawk III 2204, this time with an oxygen system that allowed him to operate in much higher altitudes. When his group of fighter planes attacked the Japanese formation, two Chinese Boeing 281s tied down the escorting Mitsubishi A5M fighters, while Yue and other Hawk IIIs attacked the bombers from 20,000 ft. After the following action, Yue went on to claim that he had shot down a "light bomber", though this was probably not correct. Based on Japanese records, historian Raymond Cheung argues that the plane Yue had attacked was Lt Yoshiyuki Kame's D1A1. Kame later reported that his machine was attacked by "a lone Hawk III diving out of the sun" and damaged, with the gunner PO1c Kuroki killed. Kame did however manage to safely return with his damaged airplane to the Kunda airfield in Shanghai.

Due to his successes, Yue was awarded the Five Star Medal and promoted to deputy commander of the 21st PS/4th PG, though by the fall of Shanghai in late November the whole unit was reduced to two operational Hawk IIIs. These were flown by Yue and his superior, Captain Tung Ming-teh, to Nanking on 3 December. Just after arriving at their new airfield, an air raid warning was sounded as a large IJNAS formation approached. Yue and Tung again took off, and went on to engage the whole bomber squadron escorted by 11 A5Ms by themselves. Yue's machine was eventually hit and he bailed out, but his parachute failed to open and he fell to his death. Tung survived and confirmed Yue's death.

== Legacy ==
Yue was buried at the Aviation Martyrs Cemetery, Nanjing, in the spring of 1946.

In 1937, the artist Ye Qianyu created a large propaganda poster based on a photograph of Yue Yiqin and used it for an exhibition in Nanjing. Yue visited the exhibition and had a photograph taken with the artist. Ye Qianyu received the photograph fifty years later from a family member of Yue's.

== See also ==
- Air Warfare of WWII from the Sino-Japanese War perspective
- Arthur Chin
- Gao Zhihang
- Louie Yim-qun
- Heroes of the Eastern Skies, a patriotic war-tribute film of which Major Yue Yiqin is briefly portrayed.

== Bibliography ==
- Cheung, Raymond (2015). Aces of the Republic of China Air Force. Oxford, New York City: Osprey Publishing. ISBN 978-1-4728-0561-4.
- Howarth, Stephen (1983). The Fighting Ships of the Rising Sun: The Drama of the Imperial Japanese Navy 1895–1945. Fairfield, Pennsylvania: Fairfield Graphics. ISBN 0-689-11402-8.
- FitzGerald, Carolyn (2013). Fragmenting Modernisms: Chinese Wartime Literature, Art, and Film, 1937-49. BRILL. ISBN 978-90-04-25099-4.
