= Carrier aircraft used during World War II =

Over 700 different aircraft models were used during World War II. At least 135 of these models were developed for naval use, including about 50 fighters and 38 bombers.

Only about 25 carrier-launched aircraft models were used extensively for combat operations. Of these, nine were introduced during the war years after the Japanese attack on Pearl Harbor brought United States into the war, four by the United States Navy (USN) and three by the Royal Navy (RN) and two by the Imperial Japanese Navy (IJN).

== Principal carrier aircraft used ==
The table below lists the principal carrier-launched fighters and bombers used during World War II. They are listed within each aircraft type in chronological order of their introduction to service. Allied reporting names such as "Val" and "Kate" are included for IJN aircraft. Neither Germany nor Italy put carriers or carrier-launched aircraft into service. Some Axis fighters are included in the table below for comparison with the Allied fighters that met them in combat.

Table of carrier aircraft 1935-1945(performance figures refer to a representative version)
Origin	Armed service use	Aircraft name & variant	Type	Year introduced	Number produced (Note: Total production including post-war)	Loaded weight (lb)	Engine power (hp)	Max (mph)	Range (miles)	Service ceiling (ft)	Rate of climb (ft/min)	Wing loading (lb/ft2)	Max ordnance (lb)	Machine guns	Cannon (20mm)	Rockets
	Carrier fighters/fighter-bombers															
Japan	IJN	Nakajima A4N1	Biplane	1936	221	3,880	730	219	526	25,390	2,812	15.7	265	2	--	--
Japan	IJN	Mitsubishi A5M-4 "Claude"	Monoplane	1937	1,094	3,684	710	270	746	32,000	2,749	19.2	132	2	--	--
UK	RN	Gloster Sea Gladiator Mk I	Biplane	1937	98	4,594	830	253	400	32,800	2,300	14.2	--	4	--	--
USA	USN	Brewster F2A-3 Buffalo	Monoplane	1939	509	4,732	1,200	321	965	33,200	2,440	34	200	4× 0.5in	--	--
UK	RN	Blackburn Roc	Monoplane	1939	136	7950	890	223	810	18,000	1500	25.6	240 (8x 30-lb)	4	--	--
Japan	IJN	Mitsubishi A6M2 Zero "Zeke"	Monoplane	1940	10,939	5,313	940	331	1,162	32,810	3,090	25.5	264	2	2	--
UK	RN	Fairey Fulmar	Monoplane	1940	600	9,672	1,300	272	780	27,200	1,200	28.3	250	8x 0.303 or 4 x 0.5		
USA	USN RN	Grumman F4F-3 Wildcat	Monoplane	1940	7,885	7,423	1,200	331	845	39,500	2,303	28.6	200	4-6	--	--
UK	RN	Hawker Sea Hurricane Mk IIC	Monoplane	1941	438	7,670	1,460	342	600	36,000	2,780	29.8			4x 20mm	--
UK	RN	Supermarine Seafire F Mk III	Monoplane	1942	2,646 (Note: 1,220 Seafire F Mark III were built)	7,232	1,585	359	465	36,000	3,250	29.9	500	4 x 0.303	2x 20mm	--
USA	USN RN	Vought F4U Corsair	Monoplane	1942 (Note: Did not begin carrier operations until late 1943)	12,571	14,533	2,380	446	1,005	41,500	4,360	46.3	4,000	--	4	8
USA	USN	Grumman Hellcat F6F-5	Monoplane	1943	12,275	12,598	2,200	391	945	37,300	3,000	37.7	4,000	4-6	2	6
UK	RN	Fairey Firefly Mk.1	Monoplane	1943	1,702	13,479	1,730	316	665	28,000	1,700	42.0	2,000	--	4	16
Japan	IJN	Kawanishi N1K1-J "George"	Monoplane	1944	1,532	8,598	1,975	355	505	39,400	3,880	34.0	1,100	--	4	--
	Notable land based fighters, for comparison															
USA	USAAF	Boeing P-26 Model 281	Monoplane	1933 (Note: Out of frontline service by end of 1941)	151	3,360	600	234	360	27,400	719	--	200	2	--	--
USSR		Polikarpov I-16 Type 24	Monoplane	1935	6,848	4,279	1,100	326	430	31,800	2,890	27.4	1,100	2	2	6
Germany	Luft.	Messerschmitt Bf 109C-1 (Note: http://www.aviation-history.com/messerschmitt/bf109.html)	Monoplane	1937	33,984	5,062	700	292	405	27,600	--	30	--	--	4	--
UK	RAF	Hawker Hurricane Mk I (Note: https://www.classicwarbirds.co.uk/british-aircraft/hawker-hurricane.php)	Monoplane	1937	14,000	6,670	1,030	316	525	36,000	2,640	29.8	--	8x 0.303	--	--
Italy	RA	Macchi C.200	Monoplane	1939	1,152	4,850	870	313	350	29,200	3,010	26.8	330	2	--	--
Germany	Luft.	Focke-Wulf Fw 190 A-8	Monoplane	1941	>20,000	9,738	1,677	405	620	33,960	3,000	49.4	1,100	2	4 (Note: 30mm cannon replaced 20mm on some sub-models)	--
Italy	RA	Reggiane Re.2001	Monoplane	1941	237	7,231	1,159	337	680	36,000	2,600	32.9	--	2	--	--
Italy	RA	Macchi C.202 Folgore	Monoplane	1941	1,150	6,460	1,159	370	765	37,700	3,560	35.7	350	4	--	--
USA	USAF RAF	North American P-51A/Mustang II	Monoplane	1942	15,000	9,200	1,490	440	1,650	41,900	3,200	39	1,000	4x 0.5in	--	6
	Torpedo bombers															
UK	RN	Fairey Swordfish	Biplane	1936	2,391	7,580	690	143	522	16,500	1,220	12.5	1,670	2	--	8
USA	USN	Douglas TBD Devastator	Monoplane	1937	130	9,862	900	206	435	20,800	720	22.0	1,935	2	--	--
Japan	IJN	Nakajima B5N2 "Kate"	Monoplane	1937	1,149	8,378	1,000	235	608	27,100	1,280	20.6	1,760	3	--	--
UK	RN	Fairey Albacore	Biplane	1940	800	10,460	1,130	161	710	18,800	750	16.8	2,000	1-2	--	--
USA	USN RN	Grumman TBF Avenger TBF-1	Monoplane	1942	9,839	15,536	1,700	278	1,215	22,402	2,060	31.7	2,000	4	--	8
UK	RN	Fairey Barracuda Mk II	Monoplane	1943	2,602	13,200	1,640	240	687	16,000	833	32.6	1,800 (Note: one torpedo or four depth charges or six bombs)	2 x 0.303		
Japan	IJN	Nakajima B6N2 "Jill"	Monoplane	1943	1,268	11,464	1,850	300	1,085	29,660	1,577	28.7	1,760	2	--	--
	Dive bombers															
USA	USN	Curtiss SBC-4 Helldiver	Biplane	1938	257	7,080	850	234	405	24,000	1,630	22.3	1,000	2	--	--
UK	RN	Blackburn Skua Mk. II	Monoplane	1938	192	8,228	890	225	760	20,200	1,580	25.8	500 (+ 160 lb)	5	--	--
USA	USN	Douglas SBD-5 Dauntless	Monoplane	1940	5,936	9,359	1,200	255	1,115	25,530	1,700	28.8	2,250	4 x 0.303		
Japan	IJN	Aichi D3A2 "Val"	Monoplane	1940	1,495	8,378	1,300	240	840	34,400	1,690	22.3	810	3	--	--
Japan	IJN	Yokosuka D4Y2 "Judy"	Monoplane	1942	2,038	9,370	1,400	343	910	35,100	2,800	36.9	1,100	2	--	--
USA	USN (Note: The British took delivery of 26Helldivers but rejected them for service use after testing)	Curtiss SB2C-4 Helldiver	Monoplane	1942	7,140	16,616	1,900	295	1,165	29,100	1,800	39.4	2,500	2	2	8

Notes:

- Values were obtained from multiple sources. Some reported values may not be directly comparable to others in the same column.
- Combat ranges for some of the aircraft could be extended using drop tanks containing supplemental fuel.
- Japanese carrier aircraft designations for planes introduced after 1922 typically adhered to the following conventions. The first letter indicated the aircraft type, "A" for fighter, "B" for torpedo bomber, "C" for reconnaissance, and "D" for dive bomber. The last letter indicated the manufacturer, "A" for Aichi, "M" for Mitsubishi, "N" for Nakajima, and "Y" for Yokosuka. The "Type" indicated the last two digits for the Japanese year that the plane was adopted for service. For example, the "D3A (Type 99)" was a dive bomber manufactured by Aichi and adapted for service during the Japanese Year 2599 (1939). The plane was actually introduced for combat in 1940. The Allies referred to it as a "Val".

Relative aircraft capabilities were not the only factors that contributed to success or failure for carrier aircraft in combat. Attack coordination and tactics, along with pilot skill, determination, and willingness to self-sacrifice were at least as important and perhaps more so. For example, both the new, high-performing Grumman TBF Avenger and the obsolete Douglas TBD Devastator were slaughtered as they tried to deliver their torpedoes at Midway without fighter protection. But their pilots' dogged pressing of their attacks in the face of almost hopeless odds created opportunities for the dive bomber pilots that, by luck as well as by determination, arrived in a timely manner to sink four IJN carriers. The effectiveness of the special attacks ("kamikaze") late in the war using mostly outdated aircraft can also be attributed to pilot determination and self-sacrifice. Nonetheless, other things being equal, faster, more maneuverable aircraft with longer ranges and better armament contributed to successful combat outcomes.

== Carrier aircraft types, functions, and features ==
Carrier aircraft types.

The types of aircraft usually launched from aircraft carriers were fighters, torpedo bombers, and dive-bombers. Floatplanes were also launched from some carriers but were typically catapulted from cruisers and battleships. Land-based aircraft types were frequently launched from carriers when delivering them to forward bases, such as when Curtiss P-40 Warhawk fighters flew from carriers to newly captured land-bases during the Allied invasion of North Africa. Sometimes land-based aircraft were launched from carriers for special operations, such as the USN Doolittle Raid, when B-25s were launched for a raid on Tokyo. Some carrier aircraft served in dual roles, such as fighter-bomber and bomber-reconnaissance aircraft.

Carrier aircraft functions.

- Torpedo and dive bombers attacked enemy warships, transports, merchant ships, and land installations.
- Fighters accompanied bombers on attack missions, protecting them during interceptions by enemy fighters. Fighters maintained overhead in Combat Air Patrols (CAP) protected their carriers and other warships in the fleet by intercepting enemy bombers and by attacking submarines.
- Fighters and bombers were also widely used for reconnaissance and sometimes used for mine laying or for spotting to assist bombardment by warships.

Carrier aircraft features.

- Size of aircrew. With few exceptions, fighters had a single crewmember, the pilot, while dive-bombers had two and torpedo bombers had three crewmembers. The RN valued a second crewmember in fighters for observation and navigation, and the Fairey Fulmar and the Fairey Firefly. The Blackburn Roc was a "turret fighter" and the second crewmember operated the turret
- Armament. Fighters and bombers typically had two to four machine guns, sometimes six. These were mostly 7.7mm or 7.62mm (.303in), but the heavier 12.7mm (.50in) were on some RN and USN aircraft. The IJN Zero fighter had the more destructive 20mm (.79in) cannon in addition to machine guns. Later in the war, RN and USN fighters also had 20mm cannon in addition to or instead of machine guns. After 1943, some fighters and bombers were also capable of firing 12.7 cm (127mm) (5 in) rockets. Bombers also carried bombs or a torpedo, the maximum possible weight for which generally increased with new introductions during the war. Most fighters could carry a small bomb load.
- Self-sealing fuel tank. Self-sealing fuel tanks retarded or eliminated the flow of fuel from a tank that has been holed during combat. This was typically accomplished by incorporating a material that swelled when it came into contact with fuel. Many RN and USN carrier aircraft used this technology, but it involved adding weight, and the IJN was reluctant to sacrifice range and maneuverability for improved survivability.
- Protective armor. Like self-sealing fuel tanks, protective armor for the aircrew improved survivability at the cost of performance. The RN and USN armored their carrier aircraft, protecting the aircrew, but the IJN typically did not.
- Number of wings. Carrier aircraft introduced after 1937 were all monoplanes except for the biplane RN Fairey Albacore which was an improved version of the Swordfish. The biplane Fairey Swordfish, introduced in 1936, was removed from front line combat but put onto anti-submarine convoy escort served through the entire war.
- Folding wings. Monoplane carrier aircraft introduced after 1936 almost all had folding wings to reduce the space taken up in hangars. . Exceptions included the Mitsubishi A5M "Claude" fighter and the Douglas SBD Dauntless and Yokosuka D4Y "Judy" dive bombers.
- Cockpit. Some early aircraft had open cockpits, but newer introductions typically had enclosed cockpits.
- Undercarriage. Most of the carrier aircraft introduced after 1937 had retractable landing gear to reduce drag. The two exceptions, introduced in 1940, were the RN Fairy Albacore torpedo bomber and the IJN Aichi D3A2 "Val" dive bomber.

== Pre- and early-war aircraft (1936-1941) ==
=== Chinese land-based aircraft vs. Japanese carrier aircraft ===
During the short “Shanghai Incident” in 1932, Japanese carrier-launched fighters and bombers and water-launched floatplanes attacked areas in and around the city. In one engagement, a group of three Mitsubishi B1M torpedo bombers and three Nakajima A1N fighters were attacked by a lone Boeing 218 fighter flown by Robert McCawley Short, an American pilot training Chinese flyers. He was shot down and the following month, Japanese fighters were unsuccessfully opposed by Chinese Curtiss Hawk fighters, some of which were also shot down.

Over the next five years, IJN introduced improved fighters including the Nakajima A2N in 1932, the first purely Japanese-designed fighter. In 1936, the Nakajima A4N entered service. The year after that, the Mitsubishi A5M "Claude" became the world's first low-wing, carrier-launched monoplane. It was highly maneuverable and the direct predecessor of the famed Mitsubishi A6M Zero introduced three years later.

At the time the Second Sino-Japanese War began in July 1937, IJN had about 200 fighters and bombers and 62 floatplanes available to attack. The Imperial Japanese Army (IJA0 had force concentrations in China's north and agreed that IJN would be responsible for aerial operations over central China. Three aircraft carriers with a total of 136 up-to-date fighters and bombers were sent to the coast off Shanghai. (Note: IJN carriers Hōshō, Kaga, and Ryūjō. Akagi was undergoing a major refit.) The Republic of China Air Force (ROCAF) was just emerging from a loose confederation of aircraft and airmen controlled by individual Chinese warlords. It was a hodgepodge of about 300 land-based fighters, mostly supplied by the US, UK, and Italy, with which to intercept Japanese fighters and bombers. The USSR also began supplying China aircraft after the Sino-Soviet Non-Aggression Pact was agreed in August.

The Curtiss Model 68 Hawk III biplane, built both in the US and China, was used by the ROCAF as a bomber as well as the primary fighter during the early part of the war. It took the brunt of the Japanese attack during the defense of Shanghai and battle of Nanking, helping to make flying aces of several Chinese pilots. Shortly after the conflict began, Gao Zhihang intercepted a land-based Japanese bomber group from Taiwan and shot down a Mitsubishi G3M medium bomber. This was the first aerial combat victory for the Chinese. In addition to Curtiss Hawk IIIs, the ROCAF opposed Japanese attacks with some older Curtis Hawk II, Boeing P-26 Peashooter, Gloster Gladiator, and Fiat CR.32 fighters. After attrition had taken its toll of these aircraft, they were replaced by Soviet Polikarpov I-15 biplane fighters and later by Polikarpov I-16 aircraft, the world's first low-wing monoplane fighter with retractable landing gear used in combat. The latter also had 20mm cannons, making it one of the most heavily armed fighters for the period.

For the next three years, IJN and ROCAF pilots fought above Beijing, Shanghai, Nanjing, Wuhan and elsewhere as Japan sought unsuccessfully to subdue China. Sometimes IJN carrier air groups were sent temporarily to land bases. Both air forces suffered defeats and enjoyed victories. Losing ground, the Chinese shifted their capital westward and inland until establishing it at Chongqing in central China. By 1941, Japan held large portions of northern and coastal China but had been weakened by the battles for inland central China. In mid-September 1941, as the IJN began to focus on the possibility of a wider war in the Pacific, it turned over responsibility for the air war over China to the Imperial Japanese Army. Continued resistance by China's National Revolutionary Army led to a war of attrition that tied down large numbers of Japanese troops until the end of World War II in 1945.

=== United States vs. Japanese carrier aircraft ===
The design of Japanese carrier aircraft was consistent with their overall strategy of emphasizing the offense in order to win a short war before America's overwhelmingly superior production capacity could be brought to bear. Expecting to face a numerically superior fleet, Japan's strategy envisioned using aircraft to help neutralize this advantage by gradual attrition as the enemy USN fleet approached Japan. This required aircraft with extended ranges and striking power, which in turn meant having them be lighter and faster but with less protection. Accordingly, Japan's Mitsubishi A6M Zero fighter, Nakajima B5N "Kate" torpedo bomber, and Aichi D3A "Val" dive bomber were all lightly-built with weight minimized by not providing cockpit armor to protect pilots or self-sealing fuel tanks to enable them to continue fighting after taking some hits. As a result of having greater range for its aircraft, the IJN would, during 1942, attack from 250 to 300 miles away compared to the USN that would only do so from 200 miles away.

Fighters

At the time of the 1941 attack on Pearl Harbor, Japan had both the world's best fighter and best torpedo bomber. In addition, their aircraft were flown by the world's most extensively trained and experienced airmen, in part due to their engagement since 1937 in the war in China. The A6M Zero was fast, highly maneuverable, and could out-turn and out-climb the USN Grumman F4F Wildcat. Also, when enemy planes were approaching for an attack, it was important for fighters to get off their decks and reach an advantageous altitude quickly. The Zero could climb at 3,000 ft/minute and the Wildcat only 2,300 ft/minute. Experienced Zero pilots were initially very successful against the lower performing Allied aircraft. Over the course of 1942, however, pilots in Wildcats developed aerial combat tactics such as the high-side pass and the Thach Weave. Exploiting these tactics coupled with greater aircraft survivability due to armor and self-sealing tanks, American pilots neutralized the Zero's advantages. Although better USN fighters were introduced later, the Wildcat served throughout the war. Over the course of 1942, Japan's substantial losses of her experienced pilots contributed to the American's gaining an upper hand in fighter combat.

Torpedo bombers

The Nakajima B5N "Kate" torpedo bomber was superior to the obsolete USN Douglas TBD Devastator in speed, rate of climb, and range. Kate torpedoes contributed to sinking USN fleet carriers Lexington (battle of the Coral Sea), Yorktown (Midway), and Hornet (Santa Cruz Islands), all during 1942. Devastator torpedoes contributed to sinking the IJN carrier Shōhō at the Coral Sea, but Zero fighters slaughtered the Devastators at Midway where they attacked without fighter protection. Only six of the 41 Devastators launched returned to their carriers. Though some closed to targets and launched torpedoes (the Mark 13 torpedo), the torpedoes ran deep or failed to explode

Dive bombers

The US had a superior dive bomber in the Douglas SBD-5 Dauntless compared to Japan's Aichi D3A2 "Val". Benefitting from fortunate timing, bombs from the Dauntless sank all four of the Japanese carriers lost at Midway. (Note: Akagi, Kaga, Soryu, Hiryu) Nonetheless, the "Vals" served throughout the war and sank more Allied warships than any other Axis aircraft. This included sinking HMS Hermes, the first carrier to be sunk by carrier aircraft.

=== United Kingdom vs. German and Italian land-based aircraft ===
Fighters

When war broke out in 1939 in the Atlantic Theater, the RN had only recently reacquired responsibility for their carrier-launched aircraft. For the previous two decades, the Royal Air Force (RAF) had responsibility for all air operations, and development of improved carrier-launched aircraft had been neglected in favor of land-based fighters for the defence of UK and bombers for the offensive. As a result, the RN entered the war with mostly relatively slow, limited range biplane fighters and bombers that were that were inferior to USN and IJN carrier aircraft of the same age. At the time of Britain's evacuation from Norway, her Gloster Sea Gladiator fighters, Fairey Swordfish torpedo bombers, and Blackburn Skua fighter-bombers were also inferior compared to the land-based German aircraft. Nonetheless, the Sea Gladiators did succeed in shooting down a couple of Messerschmitt Bf 110 fighters during the Norwegian campaign in early 1940. Gladiators and Sea Gladiators did take part in the Battle of Britain that autumn, but it was the numerous land-based Supermarine Spitfires and Hawker Hurricanes and their pilots that provided the principal aerial defense for the UK. Sea Gladiators also assisted during the defense of Malta, where the few in operation shot down Italian aircraft. Gladiators were removed from front-line service around Britain by 1941. The more modern, monoplane Blackburn Roc was able to shoot down a Junkers Ju 88 fighter-bomber attacking a convoy in 1940. However, the Roc was no match for German Messerschmitt Bf 109 or Focke-Wulf Fw 190 fighters and could not even perform as well as Britain's own Blackburn Skua. Considered one of the worst fighters of the war, the Roc was, by late 1940, taken out of front line service and consigned to training, target towing, and rescue duties. A more modern monoplane fighter, the Fairey Fulmar, was introduced in 1940 to replace the obsolete Sea Gladiator. It was a two-seat design and was large and less nimble than the Axis fighters it opposed. Nonetheless, while protecting convoys to Malta, Fulmars shot down ten Italian bombers and six Axis fighters. During the war, they provided air cover for the raids on Taranto and Petsamo, protected convoys to Russia, and supported invasions of French North Africa and Italy. Fulmars shadowed the German battleship Bismarck enabling Fairey Swordfish torpedo bombers to catch up with her. The UK upgraded their naval fighter squadrons in 1941 by adapting the highly successful, land-based Hawker Hurricane to carrier use. The Hawker Sea Hurricane performed well while protecting the Malta convoys and, operating from escort carriers, many Atlantic convoys.

Dive bombers

The monoplane Blackburn Skua two-man fighter-dive bomber was introduced in late 1938. It sank the German cruiser Königsberg during the German invasion of Norway; the first major warship sunk by a dive bomber in combat. Skuas provided air cover during the Dunkirk evacuation and served in the Mediterranean. Like the Roc, however, they fared poorly against the higher performance land-based Messerschmitt Bf 109, and were withdrawn from front line service during 1941.

Torpedo bombers

The biplane Fairey Swordfish torpedo bomber, affectionately referred to as "Stringbag" by her aircrews, was introduced in 1936. It was an archaic-looking biplane with cloth-covered wings, open cockpit and fixed landing gear. It had been designed as a torpedo-spotter-reconnaissance aircraft and emerged as the standard naval attack aircraft serving as both a dive-bomber and torpedo bomber. In the first airborne torpedo attack of the war, Swordfish damaged a German destroyer at Trondheim. Later, Swordfish crippled the French battleship Dunkerque during the Attack on Mers-el-Kébir, disabled three Italian battleships during the Battle of Taranto and attacked the German battleship Bismarck through gale-force storms in the Atlantic, ultimately landing the torpedo that doomed her. Swordfish dropped depth charges and laid mines as well as well. The Fairey Albacore was introduced in 1940 to replace the Swordfish. Both were replaced in the front line by the Barracuda, but the Swordfish was retained to serve in anti-submarine and bombardment spotting assignments throughout the war. In the final accounting, the Swordfish destroyed more tonnage of Axis shipping than any other Allied aircraft.

== Later introductions (1942-1943) ==
Over the course of the war, new aircraft introductions tended to be heavier with more powerful engines. They had greater speed, a faster rate of climb, and greater range than their predecessors. In 1944, the IJN would initiate an attack from 350 to 400 miles, 100 miles further away than in 1942. The RN would send out its Swordfish from 250 to about 300 and the USN from 250 miles out. However, aircraft "wing loading", the mass of the aircraft divided by the surface area of its wing, also tended to increase, suggesting poorer maneuverability for these larger planes.

=== United States aircraft ===
Fighters

The Vought F4U Corsair fighter-bomber introduced in 1942 had almost twice the horsepower of the Wildcat, was faster, had greater range, faster rate of climb, and was capable of carrying a 4,000 lb total load of bombs and High Velocity Aircraft Rockets. It was judged to be relatively difficult to land on a carrier, however, and was initially released by the USN only for use by land-based Marine units. The Grumman F6F Hellcat fighter-bomber introduced in 1943 was also faster than the Wildcat, had greater range, a rate of climb comparable to the IJN Zero, and was capable of carrying a 4,000 lb total load of bombs, torpedoes, and rockets. Both the Corsair and the Hellcat aircraft were faster than the Zero and, having armor protection and self-sealing fuel tanks, could take much more punishment. With the Corsair initially relegated to land-based use, the Hellcat became the mainstay of the USN Fast Carrier Task Groups of 1944–45. She was the most successful fighter of the war, with her pilots shooting down over 5,000 enemy aircraft at a 19:1 ratio of victories to losses. The Corsair was deployed for USN carrier squadrons after the British refined the aircraft and landing procedures for it.

Torpedo bombers.

After their devastating torpedo bomber losses at Midway, the USN quickly replaced the Devastator with the faster Grumman TBF Avenger. It also had twice the range of the Devastator, in part because the Avenger's torpedo was carried inside the plane, reducing drag. Like the Devastator, it had attacked the Japanese fleet at Midway without fighter protection, and only one of the six attacking planes returned to its base at Naval Air Station on Midway. The Avenger ultimately became the most effective and widely used torpedo bomber of the war and functioned even more often as a level bomber than as a torpedo bomber. Avengers operated from both fleet carriers and escort carriers and were highly effective submarine killers in both the Atlantic and Pacific theaters. They shared credit for sinking the Japanese super-battleships IJN Yamato and Musashi.

Dive bombers

The Curtiss SB2C Helldiver dive bomber introduced in 1942 was faster than the Dauntless but regarded as difficult to handle. Making necessary improvements delayed its first use in combat until late 1943. By this time, the Allies were moving away from an aircraft type dedicated to dive bombing. Air-to-ground rockets had been introduced that offered accuracy that formerly had been the primary advantage of the dive bomber over level bombers. Such rockets could be fired from the other types of carrier aircraft and were ultimately carried by Hellcat fighters, Corsair fighter-bombers, and Avenger and Swordfish torpedo bombers as well as Helldiver dive bombers. Nonetheless, the Helldiver became widely used and participated in battles over the Marianas, Philippines, Formosa, Iwo Jima, and Okinawa and sank more tonnage of Japanese shipping than any other aircraft during the war. It shared credit with Avengers for sinking IJN Yamato and Musashi.

=== United Kingdom aircraft ===
Fighters

In 1942, the British introduced another naval fighter by adapting a highly successful land-based aircraft, the Spitfire, to carrier use. The Supermarine Seafire was faster than its predecessors and began replacing Hawker Sea Hurricanes for front-line service. In light wind, however, it was subject to crash landings. Also having its engine-cooling air inlets on the underside of the fuselage made ditching more dangerous for the pilot, as was also the case with the Hurricane. The Seafire's range was limited, but could be extended using drop tanks. Seafires supported the Allied invasions of North Africa, Sicily, mainland Italy, and southern France. Temporarily assigned to land bases, they also supported the invasion of Normandy. In the Pacific as part of the British Pacific Fleet, Seafires were used for CAP. Overall, the adaptations of land aircraft had inferior performance to purpose-built carrier aircraft. Introduced late in the war, the Fairey Firefly was superior in performance and firepower to its predecessor, the Fairey Fulmer. It was conceived as early as 1938, but prolonged development delayed its combat use until mid-1944, by which time its performance had been eclipsed by both Axis and Allied fighters. The Firely was used for ground attack, reconnaissance and anti-submarine as well as a fighter aircraft. The Firefly participated in operations against the German battleship Tirpitz in Norway in July 1944. During operations against the Japanese oil refineries at Sumatra in early 1945, a Firefly shot down a Nakajima Ki-43 (“Oscar”) fighter. Fireflies also supported carrier-based actions against Japanese shipping and against positions in the Caroline and Japanese home islands. Less than 800 were produced during the war years.

Bombers

The Fairey Barracuda torpedo bomber/dive bomber was introduced in early 1943 and was the only RN aircraft designed to withstand the stresses of dive bombing since the retirement of the Skua.

As the war progressed, the RN increasingly used US-made, purpose-built Hellcats, Corsairs, and Avengers for carrier operations in both the Atlantic and Pacific theaters.

=== Japanese aircraft ===
Fighters

The Zero was among the world's best fighters at the time of the raid on Pearl Harbor. It was little improved over the war, while the Allies introduced more powerful planes with better protection. Over time, the Zero lost its competitive advantage due to development by the Allies of more capable aircraft as well as improved tactics. The IJN introduced a land-based fighter, the Kawanishi N1K1-J, in 1944 that had the power, maneuverability, and ruggedness to compete with the late-war Allied fighters. An improved version of the carrier-launched Zero, the Mitsubishi A6M6, included self-sealing fuel tanks, armor plate protection for the pilot, and a more powerful engine, but the additions made it heavier and less nimble. Only one prototype was built before the war ended. With its diminished value as a competitive fighter, the Zero became the first aircraft to be used as a kamikaze special attack plane and was used more than any other aircraft for this purpose. (Note: Of the 2,363 Japanese Navy aircraft that served as kamakazes, 1,189 of them were A6M Zero fighters)

Torpedo bombers

The Nakajima B6N "Jill" torpedo bomber incorporated considerable improvements over the Nakajima B5N "Kate" in speed and range but its introduction was delayed by development and production problems. By the time the Jill was introduced, the Allied thrust up the Solomon Islands caused IJN leadership, in late 1943, to transfer many carrier aircraft from their first line carriers to land-based service out of Rabaul. With the Allies having firmly established air superiority in the area, only a fraction of these planes made it back to their carriers two weeks later. In the following year, carrier-based Jills suffered huge losses at the Battle of the Philippine Sea in mid-1944. With so few IJN carriers remaining afloat after the Battle of Leyte Gulf, the Jills became mostly land-based and by early 1945 were in use as kamikazes.

Dive bombers

IJN plans to upgrade carrier bombers were also frustrated by development and production delays. The Yokosuka D4Y3 "Judy" dive bomber was introduced in mid-1942 and intended to replace the slower "Val" by the end of that year, but the Val was kept in service until 1944. The Judy could outrun the USN Wildcat but, by the time the Judy came into wide use, the even faster USN Hellcat had been introduced. Many Judys were among the several hundred IJN planes lost during the Battle of the Philippine Sea. Nonetheless, it was bombs from a Judy, then operating from a land-base in the Philippines, that sank the light carrier USN Princeton during the Battle of Leyte Gulf in October 1944. A bomb from another Judy almost sank USN Franklin in March 1945.

Kamikaze special attack aircraft

Japanese use of "kamikaze" suicide aircraft began at the Leyte Gulf battle, and the D4Y3 "Judy" served in that role, damaging several Allied fleet and escort carriers. As the Allies approached Japan in early 1945, the IJN introduced the Yokosuka D4Y4, specifically for use as a kamikaze. Operating from land-bases, this version caused damage to several Allied carriers. By the end of the war, all six of the monoplane IJN carrier aircraft models used extensively during the war had also been engaged as kamikazes. Non-kamikaze aircraft models continued in use, often providing escort protection for kamikazes en route to enemy fleets.
