= John Wong Pan-yang =

Chinese-American aviator

- 黄泮扬
- Born: Huang Panyang (Chinese: 黄泮扬); 1910; Zhongshan, Guangdong, Qing China
- Military career
- Allegiance: (Taiwan) Republic of China
- Branch: Republic of China Air Force
- Service years: 1932–1949
- Rank: Major
- Commands: 17th Pursuit Squadron; 5th Pursuit Group
- Conflicts: War of Resistance/WWII: Battle of Shanghai; Battle of Nanking; Battle of Canton; Battle of South Guangxi; Battle of Chongqing-Chengdu

Huang Panyang (a.k.a. Wong Pan-yang/Wong Pan-Yang or simply John Wong, Chinese: 黄泮扬; pinyin: Huang Panyang; Wade–Giles: Huang Panyang; 1910 – ?) was a Chinese-American aviator who volunteered to serve in the Chinese Air Force in the looming war against the Imperial Japanese invasion and occupation; first entering service in China with the previously-separated "warlord air force" under Guangdong provincial leader General Chen Jitang, before centralizing under the Nationalist Chinese Air Force of the Republic of China.

== Biography ==
John Wong Pan-yang (Cantonese: Poon-Yeung Wong; Hanyu Pinyin: Panyang Huang) was born in Zhongshan County, Guangdong Province, China. In 1916, at the age of six, he emigrated with his father to Seattle, Washington in the United States, where he would live with his uncle even as his father returned to China six years later. John Wong befriended Arthur Chin after moving to Portland, Oregon, where they both enrolled in a Chinese-American-established flight school (the Chinese Flying Club of Portland) with tuition costs and expenses paid-for by donations from the Chinese-American community for the promise to join the Chinese military in the looming war against the Empire of Japan at the time.

John Wong received his U.S. civilian pilots' license in April 1932, traveling to China to join the Guangdong Provincial Air Force under General Chen Jitang, and was then sent to Germany along with other native Chinese and Chinese-American volunteer pilots by the Guangdong government, including Arthur Chin, for advanced aerial gunnery training with the Luftwaffe at Lagerlechfeld Air Base in southern Germany. Wong returned to China in 1936 and completed advanced training at the Hangzhou Jianqiao Aviation School.

By then, the provincial and warlord air forces have become absorbed into the central Chinese Air Force, and Wong was assigned to command the 17th Pursuit Squadron (PS) of the central government's 3rd Pursuit Group (PG) flying the Boeing P-26 Peashooter Model 281, stationed at Chuyung Airbase (Jurong Airbase) in defense of Nanjing following the beginning of the Second Sino-Japanese War in 1937.

Captain John Wong Pan-yang's first aerial battle took place on 15 August 1937 when he scrambled eight of his 17th PS/3rd PG fighters against an incoming raid of 20 Mitsubishi G3M bombers from the Kisarazu Kokutai, along with five Fiat CR.32s of the 8th PS/3rd PG led by Capt. Chen Yaowei, seven Hawk IIs of the 28th PS/5th PG led by another Chinese-American, Capt. Chan Kee-Wong (Chen Qiguang), and five additional Hawk IIs plus a single Hawk III of the 34th Provisional PS. Wang and fellow pilot Su Ying-Hsien shared one victory that day.

Wong yet again engaged another large bombing raid on Chuyung the following day, 16 August 1937, scoring a triple-kill over the G3M raiders from the Kanoya Kokutai. Wong first attacked the latter's command flight, downing the G3M of Lieutenant Commander Nitta, and damaging another commanded by Lieutenant Junior Grade Watanbe. He joined the Chinese-American Lieutenant Tse-Tsim Wong in pursuing another G3M flight, downing another bomber. Wong was credited with three victories during the air battle on this day, although Watanbe's aircraft returned to base damaged.

In the early morning of 23 August 1937, Wong led seven of his fighters in an escort of at least 12 Hawks of the 4th and 5th groups led by Capt. Huang Kuang-Han (English name Raymond Wong) on a strike against Japanese landing forces and naval assets at Wusongkou on northern shores of Shanghai metropolis; while on approach over the target area, John Wong's Peashooter pilots engaged the defending Japanese navy fighters while the Hawks went for the ground targets, and in the intense running dogfight, deputy commander Lt. John Huang Xinrui shot down a Nakajima A4N fighter near Chongming Island, however, Lt. Qin Jiazhu was killed in the melee.

"John Wong, a slim, malarial U.S.-born Cantonese pilot who shot down 13 Japs and was later Chinese air attaché in London"

— Claire Lee Chennault, Way of a Fighter

During the Battle of Shanghai, Wong escorted Chinese bombers and fighter-bombers but the Chinese pilots found themselves at a disadvantage against the Japanese A2N, A4N, and A5M fighters. He claimed one floatplane damaged on 20 September. In early November, just before the fall of Nanking, Wong's 17th Pursuit Squadron was pulled out to Hankou and shifted to the 5th Pursuit Group. On 3 December he returned to Nanjing to fly a reconnaissance mission on the Chinese air force's single Hawk 75, escaping two intercepting groups of Japanese fighters and gaining target information that was passed on to the newly arrived Soviet-crewed SB-2 bomber units.

Wong was promoted to command the 5th Pursuit Group in April 1938 and two months later was stationed at Shaoguan, commanding Art Chin's 28th Pursuit Squadron and the 29th Pursuit Squadron. Both units were equipped with the Gloster Gladiator biplane fighter. On 16 June he led eight other Gladiators into actions against a Japanese bombing raid targeting the Le Chang station on the Canton-Hankow railway. Wong shot down two G3Ms in this action, his last victories of the war. Wong took part in the air battles over Guangxi and the air defense of Chengdu in 1939, but the Chinese fighter pilots found it difficult to contest the Japanese night raids. During the air defense of Chengdu, Wong flew a captured Ki-27 monoplane fighter against Japanese bombers conducting night raids without success. After entering the staff college in 1940, Wong served as air attache at the Chinese embassy in London. He received the Four Star Medal for aerial victories although his official victory tally was six, as mentioned by the Republic of China Air Force's official history. Postwar, Wong did not return to the United States and settled in Hong Kong, working as general manager of an industrial firm.

== See also ==
- Louie Yim-qun

== Bibliography ==
- Cheung, Raymond (2015). Osprey Aircraft of the Aces 126: Aces of the Republic of China Air Force. Oxford: Osprey Publishing. ISBN 978-14728-05614.
