= Jurong Airfield =

Jurong Airfield 句容飞机场
- IATA: none; ICAO: none

Summary
- Airport type: Military
- Serves: Nanjing, Jiangsu, China
- Location: Jurong, Zhenjiang, Jiangsu, China

Jurong Airfield (Chinese: 句容飞机场; pinyin: Jùróng fēijīchǎng), also romanized as Chuyung (Cantonese), was an air force base serving in defense of former capital city of Nanjing during the Republic of China era on the mainland.

== History ==
During the period of the Nanjing decade, the Imperial Japanese forces staged the Manchurian incident, which prompted the urgency of the Chinese government in strengthening the national defense of the capital city; Commandant of the Chinese Military Academy General Zhang Zhizhong first proposed to Generalissimo Chiang Kai-shek the building of Jurong airbase to guard Nanjing. During the construction work on Jurong Airbase, many ancient artifacts were excavated on-site, including ceramic "Korean water kettles" (water containers used by soldiers of Han Shizhong of the Song dynasty), an ancient tomb, multiple coffins, sacrificial objects and swords. The construction of Jurong airbase was completed in 1934, requiring 610,000 cubic meters of earthwork, over 220,000 yuan in labor and miscellaneous expenses.

On 13 August 1937, in the Battle of Shanghai (which filmmaker Bill Einreinhofer would claim in a documentary as the battle "where World War II began") the Chinese Air Force had dispatched the following units to Jurong airbase in support of the Battle of Shanghai and defense of Nanjing: the 17th Pursuit Squadron, 3rd Pursuit Group composed of Boeing P-26/281 fighters, which included pilots Liu Lanqing (first documented victim of death by strafing while descending in a parachute), Qin Jiazhu, along with members of the original Chinese-American volunteer group of fighter pilots John "Buffalo" Huang and John Wong Pan-Yang, plus pilots and crew of the 28th PS, 5th PG flying the Curtiss Hawk II fighters that included Capt. Chan Kee-wong, Lt. Arthur Chin, Lt. Louie Yim-qun et al., the 8th PS, 3rd PG composed of Fiat CR.32 fighters commanded by Capt. Chen Yau-Wei, and several additional Hawk IIs and a Hawk III from the 34th Provisional PS.

On 15 August 1937, the air raid warning net established with the help of the American advisor to the Chinese Air Force, Claire Lee Chennault, reported an incoming flight of 16-20 Imperial Japanese Navy Air Force (IJNAF) G3M twin-engined fast bombers entering the airspace over Suzhou on approach to Nanjing, whose mission was to neutralize Chinese Air Force assets at Jurong airbase; Jurong scrambled eight 17th PS P-26/281 fighters, seven 28th PS Hawk IIs, five 8th PS CR.32s, and five Hawk IIs plus a single Hawk III to engage the incoming Japanese raiders. In the ensuing confusion of the battle, Capt. John Huang Xinrui (flying the P-26/281 #1703) is credited with the first enemy aircraft of the first raid of the Battle of Nanjing to be shot down, identified as the 4th or 5th bomber of the Kisarazu Kokutai Shotai led by Lt. Yoshida. Maj. Wong would share in another G3M with Lt. Su Yongxiang. Lt. Qin Jiazhu (flying the P-26/281 #1702) would shoot down another G3M which crashed southeast of Nanjing, Capt. Cen Zeliu and Lt. Liu Qiwei shared one kill, while Capt. Chan Kee-wong shot up two G3Ms that were observed to have gone down over Nanjing; these kills may have been the shared kills made by Capt. Chen and Lt. Huang of the 8th PS and/or several other shared kills made by pilots of the 4th PG that flew in from Hangzhou Jianqiao Airbase to help defend the capital city, but erroneously credited to others while omitting Capt. Chan Kee-wong's credit for the kill(s).

As the battle for Shanghai raged on through the end of August and into September, the Imperial Japanese Army Air Force (IJAAF) was harassing Chinese strongholds in the north of the Yellow River, specifically with the eruption of fighting at the Battle of Taiyuan, and at the southern front, in Guangdong Province by carrier aircraft of the IJNAF; the limited Chinese Air Force combat aircraft numbers now had to be further stretched thin over the massive warfront as the 28th PS, 5th PG stationed at Jurong Airbase had to be split into two smaller squadrons and detached to the Battle of Taiyuan in the north, commanded by Capt. Chan Kee-Wong, and Nanxiong and Guangzhou in the south, commanded by Lt. Arthur Chin, culminating into the Battle of Canton.The 8th and 17th squadrons of the 3rd group would remain in Jurong to continue defense of Nanjing and the continued support of the battle of Shanghai, with some members, including Capt. Cen Zeliu, soon being dispatched to the northwest at Lanzhou to train in the new Polikarpov I-15 and I-16 series of fighter aircraft.

Following the Fall of Shanghai, many soldiers of the National Revolutionary Army retreated westward across Jiangsu province in a running battle, and finally through the Jurong area where the 51st and 66th Division put up a bloody last-stand, losing Jurong on 6–8 December 1937; the capture of Jurong had placed Nanjing city within striking range of Japanese heavy artillery. Following the Fall of Nanjing, the provisional wartime capital was established at Wuhan as the war raged into 1938; many Imperial Japanese Army positions at Jurong and surrounding areas faced continued guerrilla warfare attacks by the New Fourth Army from 1938, until the end of the war in 1945.

The location of the historic Jurong airbase is described to be at 1 kilometre (0.62 mi) from the north gate of Jurong County, Zhenjiang City, the former provincial capital of Jiangsu, about 40 kilometres (25 mi) east of Nanjing, and is now the site of Jurong Polytechnic College of Agriculture and Forestry.

== See also ==
- Air Warfare of WWII from the Sino-Japanese War perspective
- Aircraft of Chinese civil and militaries/warlords from before 1937
- Battle of Wuhan - the battle for the wartime capital of China following the fall of Nanjing
- Battle of Chongqing - the battle for the wartime capital of China following the fall of Wuhan
