= Boeing P-26 Peashooter =

Fighter aircraft series

P-26 "Peashooter"
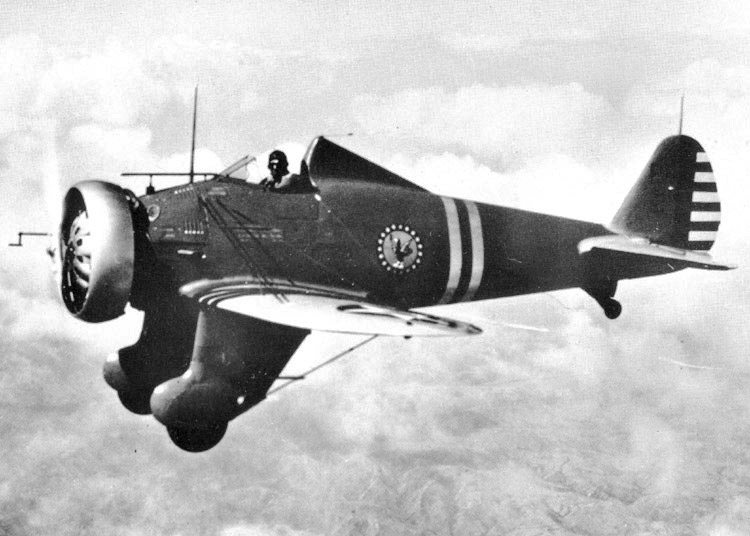

General information
- Type: Fighter
- National origin: United States
- Manufacturer: Boeing
- Primary users: United States Army Air Corps Republic of China Air Force; Philippine Army Air Corps; Guatemalan Air Force
- Number built: 151

History
- First flight: 20 March 1932
- Retired: 1956
- Variant: Boeing P-29/XF7B-1

The Boeing P-26 "Peashooter" is the first American production all-metal fighter aircraft and the first pursuit monoplane to enter squadron service with the United States Army Air Corps. Designed and built by Boeing, the prototype first flew in 1932, and the type was still in use with the U.S. Army Air Corps as late as 1941 in the Philippines. There are two surviving Peashooters and three reproductions on display, with two more under construction.

== Design and development ==
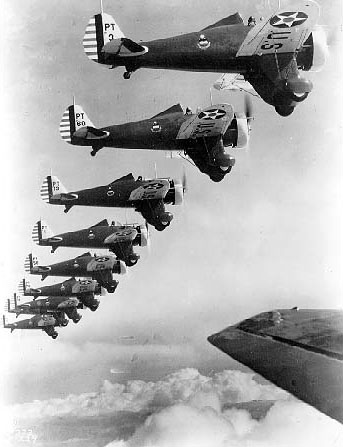
Formation of nine Boeing P-26s of the 20th Pursuit Group

The project, funded by Boeing, to produce the Boeing Model 248 began in September 1931, with the US Army Air Corps supplying the engines and the instruments. The open cockpit, fixed landing gear, externally braced wing design was the last such design procured by the USAAC as a fighter. The Model 248 had a high landing speed, which caused a number of accidents. To remedy this, flaps were fitted to reduce the landing speed. The Army Air Corps ordered three prototypes, designated XP-936, which first flew on 20 March 1932.

The Boeing XP-936's headrest offered little protection should it overturn on landing, risking injury to the pilot. As a result, production Model 266s (P-26As) had a taller headrest installed to provide protection.

Two fighters were completed as P-26Bs with fuel-injected Pratt & Whitney R-1340-33 engines. These were followed by twenty-three P-26Cs, with carburated R-1340-27s and modified fuel systems. Both the Spanish Air Force (one aircraft) and the Republic of China Air Force (eleven aircraft) ordered examples of the Boeing Model 281, an export version comparable to the P-26C, in 1936.

The "Peashooter", as it was known by service pilots, was faster than previous American combat aircraft. Nonetheless, rapid progress in aviation led to it quickly becoming an anachronism, with wire-braced wings, fixed landing gear and an open cockpit. The cantilever-wing Dewoitine D.500 flew the same year as the P-26 and two years afterwards, the Soviet I-16 with retractable landing gear started flying. By 1935, just three years after the P-26, the Curtiss P-36, Messerschmitt Bf 109 and Hawker Hurricane were flying, all with enclosed cockpits, retractable landing gear and cantilever wings. However, some P-26s remained in service until after the United States entered World War II in December 1941.

== Operational history ==
=== U.S. Army Air Corps ===
Deliveries to USAAC pursuit squadrons began in December 1933 with the last production P-26C aircraft coming off the assembly line in 1936. Ultimately, 22 squadrons flew the Peashooter, with peak service being six squadrons, in 1936. P-26s were the frontline fighters of the USAAC until 1938, when Seversky P-35s and Curtiss P-36s began to replace them. A total of twenty P-26s were lost in accidents between 1934 and America's entry into World War II on 7 December 1941, but only five of them were before 1940.

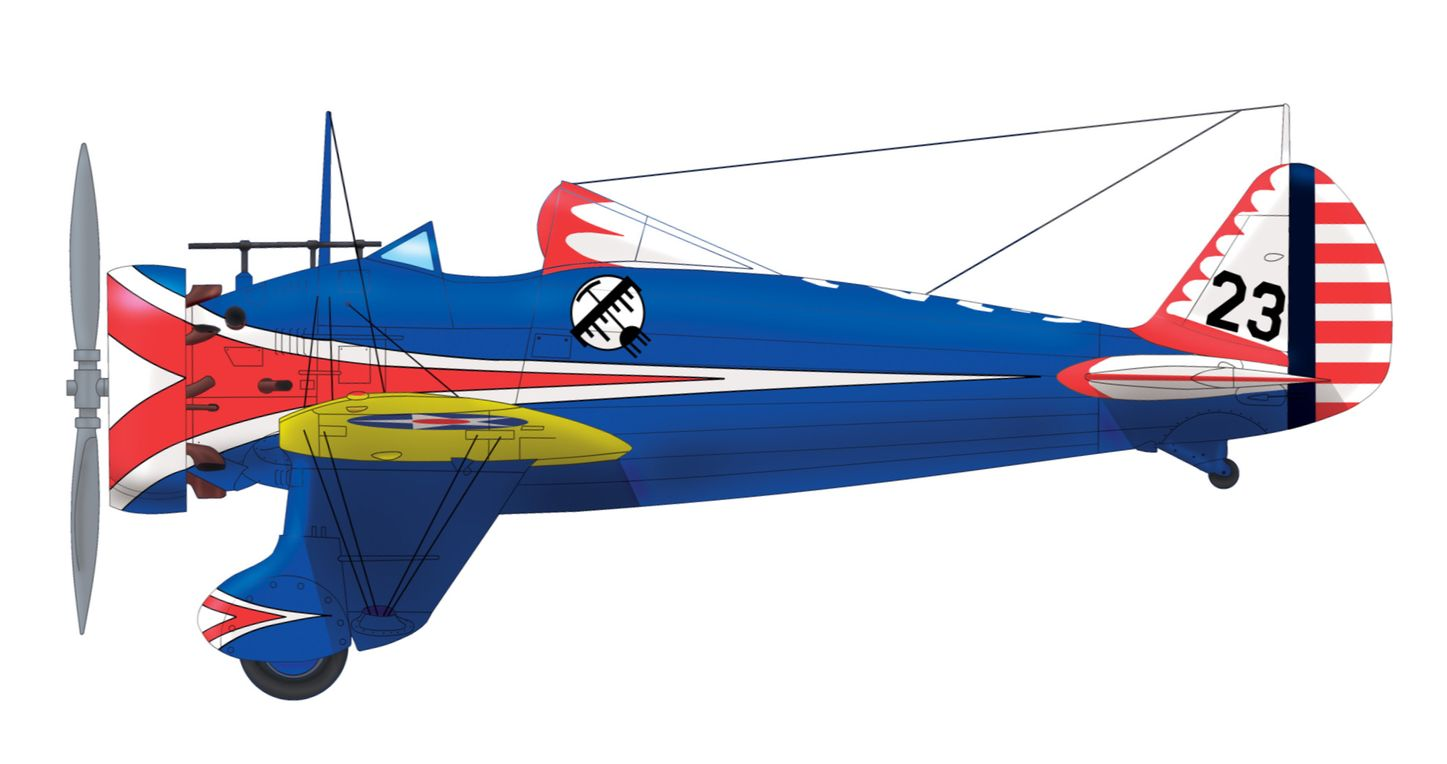
Boeing P-26A Peashooter of the 34th Pursuit Squadron 17th Pursuit Group

Air Corps units using the P-26 were the:

- 1st Pursuit Group (17th, 27th, and 94th PS), Selfridge Field, Michigan;
- 4th Composite Group (3d, 17th, and 20th PS), Nichols and Clark fields, Philippine Department.
- 8th Pursuit Group (33rd, 35th, and 36th PS), Langley Field, Virginia;
- 16th Pursuit Group (24th and 78th PS), Albrook Field, Panama Canal Zone;
- 17th Pursuit Group (34th, 73d, and 95th PS), March Field, California
- 18th Pursuit Group (6th and 19th PS), Wheeler Field, Hawaii; and
- 20th Pursuit Group (55th, 77th, and 79th PS), Barksdale Field, Louisiana.

==== Overseas deployments ====
Between 1938 and 1940, P-26s were assigned overseas to supplement Seversky P-35s in two defense units based at Wheeler Field, Territory of Hawaii:

- 18th Pursuit Group (6th, 19th, 73d, and 78th PS)
- 15th Pursuit Group (45th and 47th PS).

The 17th PG became the 17th Attack Group in 1935, and its P-26s were transferred in 1938 to the 16th Pursuit Group (24th, 29th, and 78th PS) at Albrook Field in the Panama Canal Zone. These P-26s were transferred in 1940 to the 37th Pursuit Group (28th, 30th, and 31st PS) which flew them until they were replaced by P-40s in May 1941. Some continued service with the 32d Pursuit Group (51st and 53rd PS), but only nine P-26s remained operational in Central America at the start of World War II, although seven P-26As remained on strength with the Sixth Air Force as late as May 1943.

P-26As were also flown by the 3d PS of the 4th Composite Group, based in the Philippines. Between 1937 and 1941, 31 were sold to the fledgling Philippine Army Air Corps.

=== Combat service ===
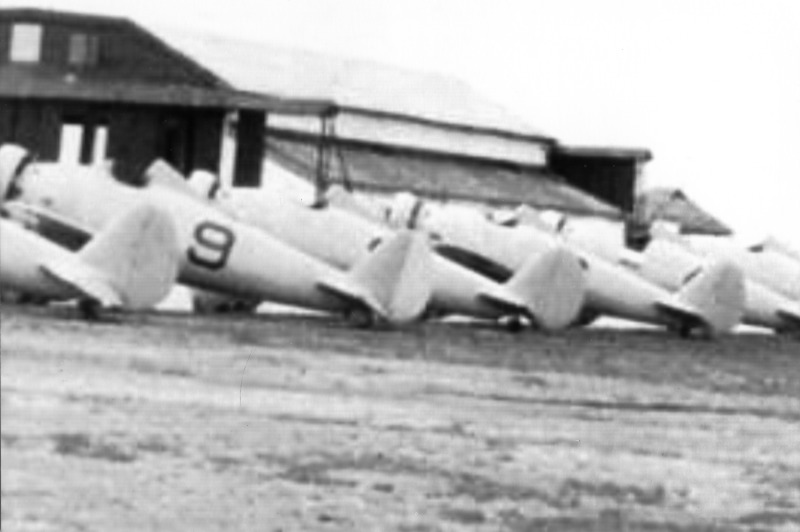
Lineup of Chinese Boeing 281s

The first example to see combat was a Model 281 sent to Spain before the outbreak of the Spanish Civil War. It was operated by the Spanish Republican Air Force, but no kills were made with it before it was shot down on October 21, 1936.

On 15 August 1937, eight 281s from the Chinese Nationalist Air Force 3rd Pursuit Group, 17th Squadron, based at Chuyung airfield, engaged eight of twenty Mitsubishi G3M Nell medium bombers from the Kisarazu Air Group attacking Nanking. Four of the Chinese fighters shot down three of the fourteen Japanese bombers destroyed that day without suffering any losses, while Chinese Hawk IIs, Hawk IIIs and Fiat CR.32s claimed the other eleven. Subsequent engagements between the Chinese 281 pilots and Japanese Navy Mitsubishi A5Ms were the first aerial dogfights and kills between all-metal monoplane fighter aircraft. Chinese-American volunteer pilots who joined the Chinese Air Force in the mid-1930s include aces John "Buffalo" Huang and John Wong Pan-yang, both of whom successfully fought the Japanese in the 281. John Wong Pan-yang scored two shared kills over A5Ms on 22 September 1937 and a solo kill over an A5M on 12 October 1937 over Nanking while in his Boeing 281.

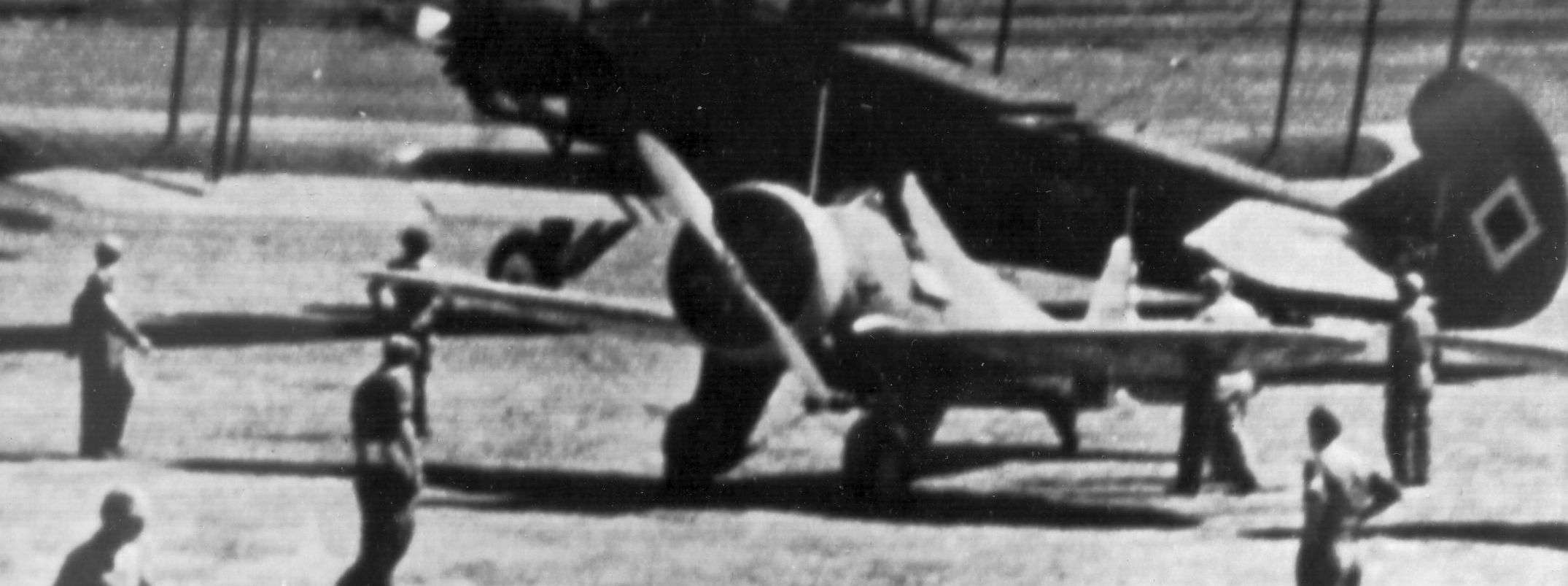
Philippine AF P-26A in 1941

By December 1941, U.S. fighter strength in the Philippines included 28 P-26s, 12 of which were operational with the 6th Pursuit Squadron of the Philippine Army Air Corps. Captain Jesús A. Villamor and his squadron of P-26s engaged Japanese Mitsubishi A6M Zeros above Zablan and Batangas Fields and, despite being outclassed, Villamor and his squadron claimed four kills, one Mitsubishi G3M bomber and three Zeros, two by Villamor himself. For these actions, Villamor was awarded the Distinguished Service Cross and an Oak Leaf Cluster. The P-26s were burned to prevent their capture by advancing Imperial Japanese Army forces on 24 December 1941. Nine P-26s remained airworthy with the United States Army Air Forces (as the USAAC had been renamed in June 1941) in the Panama Canal Zone.

During 1942–1943, the Fuerza Aérea Guatemalteca (Guatemalan Air Force) acquired seven P-26s, which the United States government delivered to Guatemala as "Boeing PT-26A" trainers to circumvent restrictions on sales of fighters to Latin American countries. The P-26's last combat operation was with the Guatemalan Air Force during a 1954 coup d'état. The final pair of P-26s still flying in military service in the world would be replaced with North American P-51 Mustangs two years later in 1956.

Although Boeing produced the prototype XF8B in 1944 and the X-32 entry in the Joint Strike Fighter contest in 2000, the P-26 was the last Boeing Company fighter aircraft to enter service until Boeing acquired McDonnell Douglas in 1997 and took over its production and continuing support contracts for the F-15 Eagle and the F/A-18E/F Super Hornet.

== Variants ==
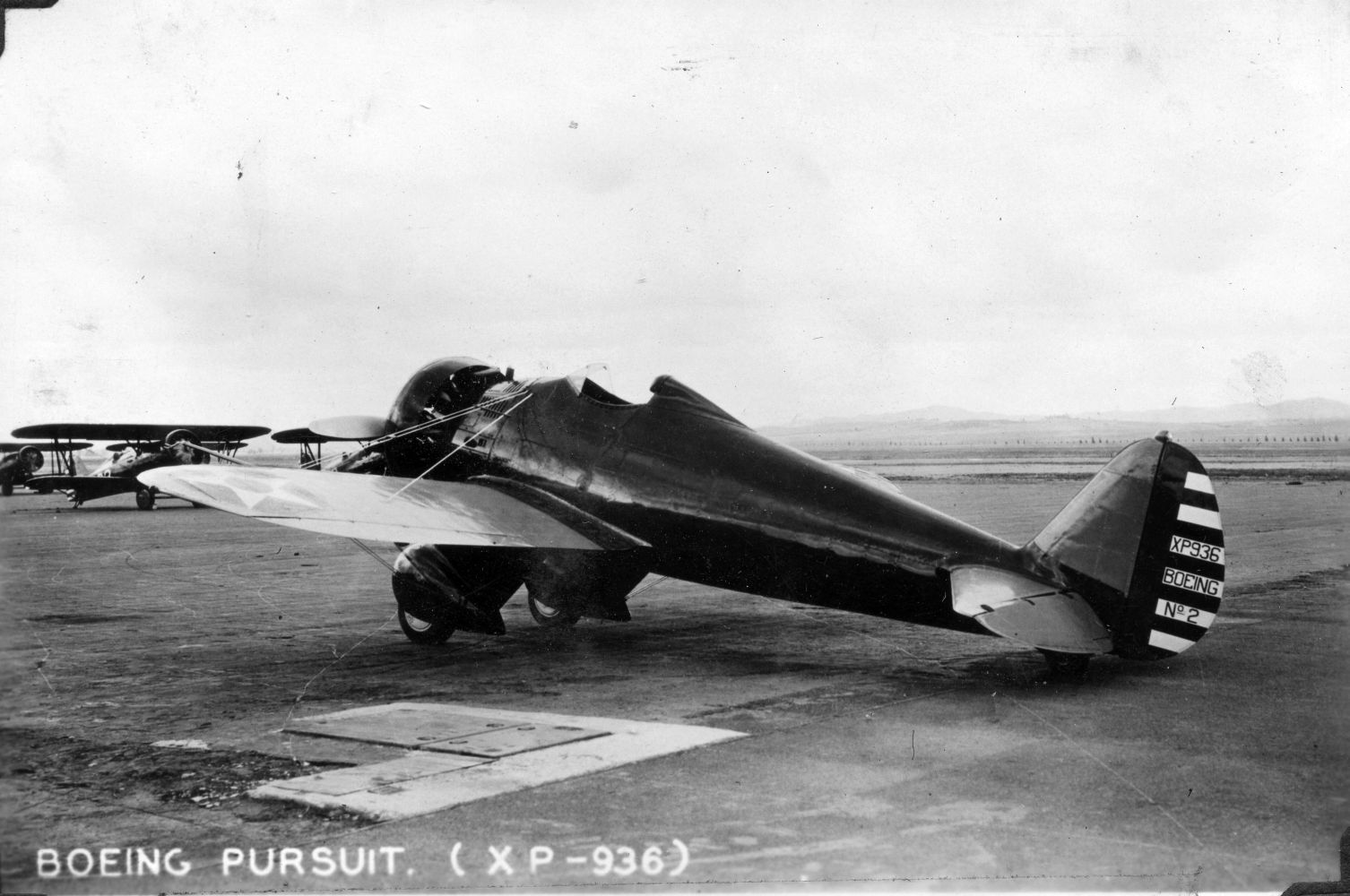
Boeing XP-936 prototype with shorter headrest

XP-936
Model 248, prototypes powered by a 522 hp (389 kW) Pratt & Whitney SR-1340E Wasp radial engine, three built.
XP-26
Designation assigned to the three XP-936 aircraft after acquisition by the USAAC on June 15, 1932. Other designations assigned to the aircraft included Y1P-26, XY1P-26, and eventually P-26.
P-26A
Model 266, first production variant, powered by a 600 hp (450 kW) R-1340-27. Multiple modifications were made during the production run and afterward. 111 built. Surviving aircraft were redesignated RP-26A in October 1942 and then ZP-26A in December.
P-26B
Model 266A, improved variant powered by a fuel-injected 600 hp (450 kW) R-1340-33. Two built, with 17 more being converted from P-26Cs.
P-26C
Interim variant with a carbureted R-1340-27 and a modified fuel system. Flaps were factory installed. 23 built. All surviving P-26Cs were modified into P-26B standard in 1936.
Model 281
Export version of the P-26C; 11 built for China and one for Spain.

== Operators ==
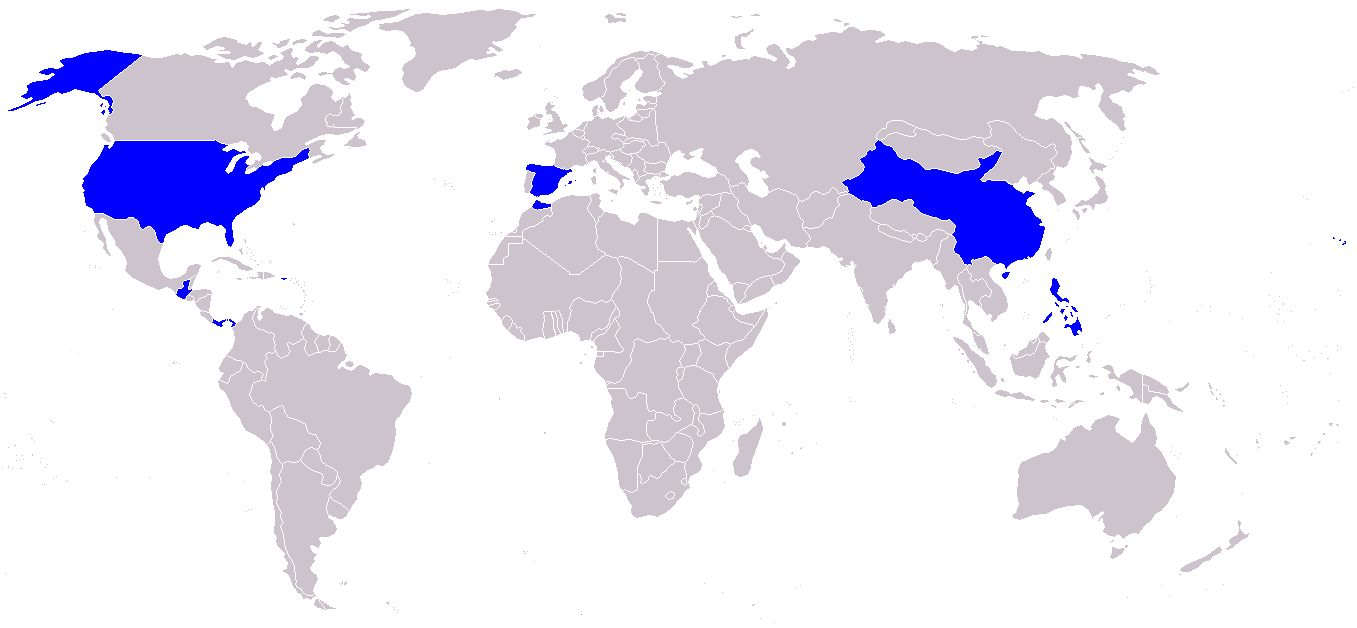
Operators of the P-26.

United States

- United States Army Air Corps

Republic of China

- Republic of China Air Force – (11 aircraft in the 1930s)

Guatemala

- Fuerza Aérea Guatemalteca – (7 aircraft operated 1942 to 1956)

Philippines

- Philippine Army Air Corps – (12 operated in late 1941)

Spain

- Fuerzas Aéreas de la República Española – (1 demonstrator used briefly)

== Surviving aircraft ==
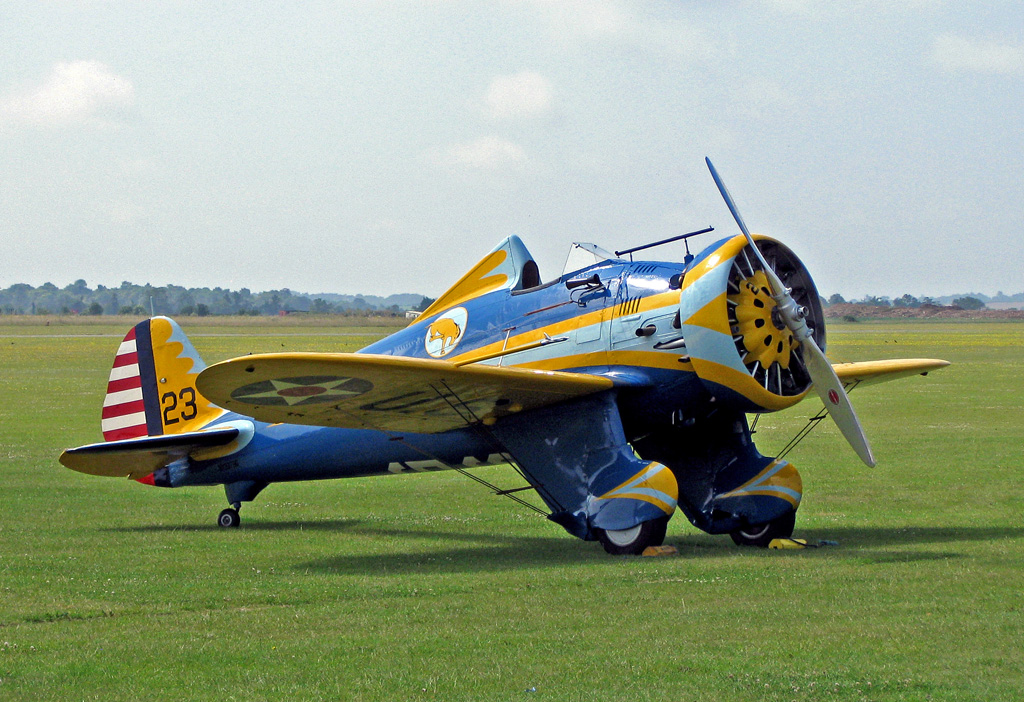
P-26A 33-123 at Duxford in England

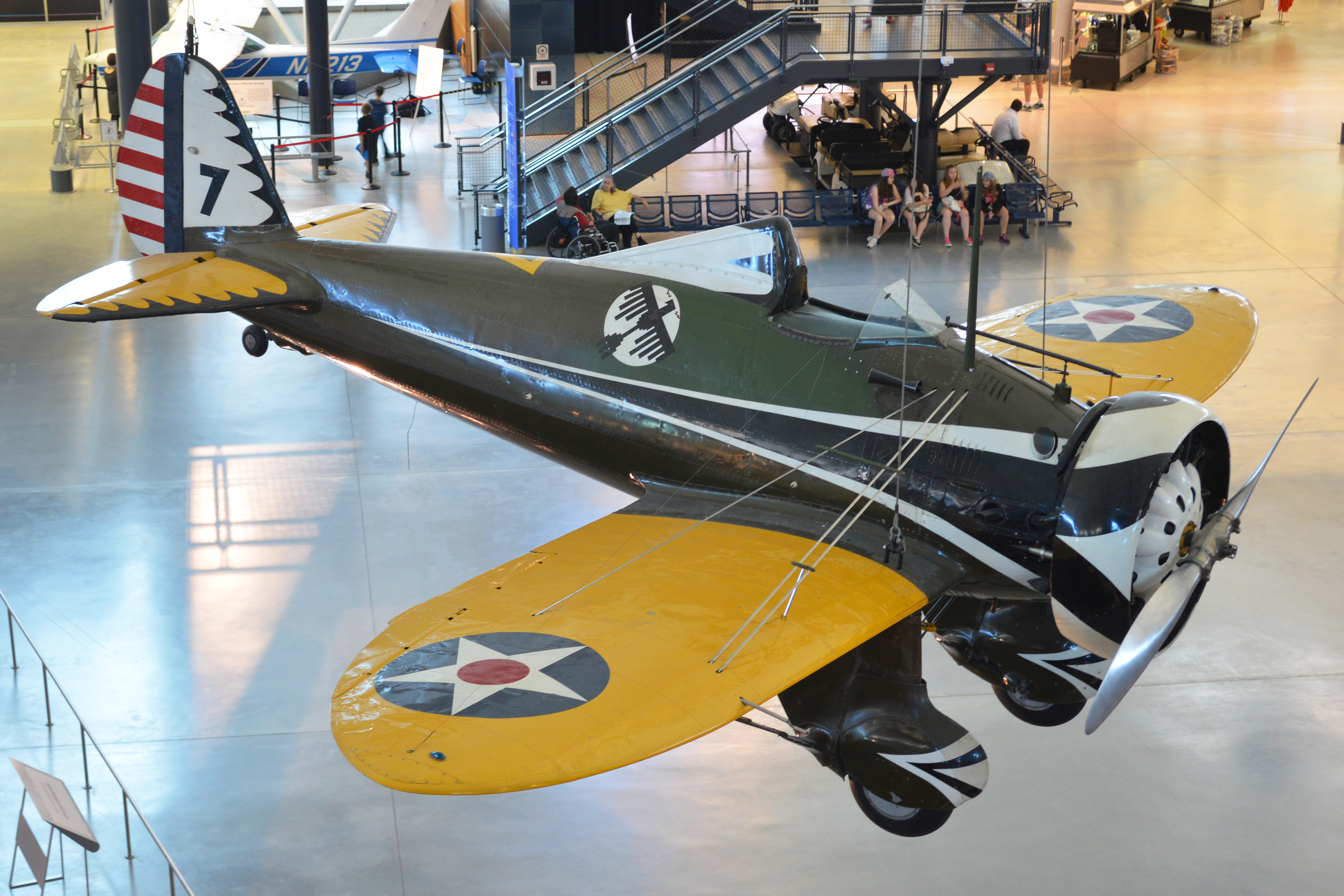
P-26A 33-135 in 34th Pursuit Squadron markings, at the National Air and Space Museum′s Steven F. Udvar-Hazy Center

- P-26A c/n 1899 serial number 33-123 is on display at the Planes of Fame Museum in Chino, California, and is the only remaining flying P-26. This aircraft was flown by the 27th Pursuit Squadron at Selfridge Field, Michigan and the 20th Pursuit Group at Barksdale Field, Louisiana before being deployed to the Panama Canal Zone. It was later sold to the Guatemalan Air Force on 11 May 1943, and it flew as FAG 0672 until it was retired in 1957. Flown regularly with the registration N3378G, the museum placed it on static display in the mid-1980s to protect it. In 2004, the decision was made to again fly the P-26, and it made its first public flight during the museum's air show in May 2006. The aircraft was shipped across the Atlantic and flown and displayed at Duxford Aerodrome in England in July 2014 during the type's first post-World War II visit to Europe.
- P-26A c/n 1911 serial number 33-135 is with the Smithsonian Institution′s National Air and Space Museum's Steven F. Udvar-Hazy Center in Chantilly, Virginia This aircraft was assigned to the 94th Pursuit Squadron at Selfridge Field, Michigan, until being sent to the Panama Canal Zone. It was sold to the Guatemalan Air Force on 11 May 1943, and it was flown as FAG 0816 until retired in 1957 when it was donated to the Smithsonian. This aircraft was restored by the USAF, and was displayed at the National Museum of the United States Air Force in 34th Attack Squadron markings until 1975, when it was returned to the National Air and Space Museum in 1976.

=== Replicas ===
- A P-26A reproduction is on display at the National Museum of the United States Air Force at Wright-Patterson AFB in Dayton, Ohio. It is painted as the commander's aircraft of the 19th PS / 18th PG, stationed at Wheeler Field, Oahu, Territory of Hawaii, in 1938.
- The San Diego Air and Space Museum has made a reproduction of an early model to Boeing's plans with the original design's "streamlined tailwheel" and without flaps and the crossover exhaust that were later additions.
- P-26D: A flying replica completed in 2006 is in the collection of the Military Aviation Museum, Virginia Beach, Virginia. Mayocraft Inc., completed the final assembly in September 2006, and it went on display in June, 2011 after nearly 12 years of construction. Retrieved: 17 March 2007.
- P-26A: Two flyable reproduction aircraft using original blueprints were being constructed by Golden Age Aeroplane Works in Brownstown, Indiana and are being completed by Legend Flyers in Everett, Washington from 2023 onward. One will be donated to the Spirit of Flight Museum and the other is being retained by Legend Flyers.
- A P-26A replica in Philippine Army Air Corps colors is on display at the Bunker Building in Bataan, Philippines.

== Specifications (P-26A) ==
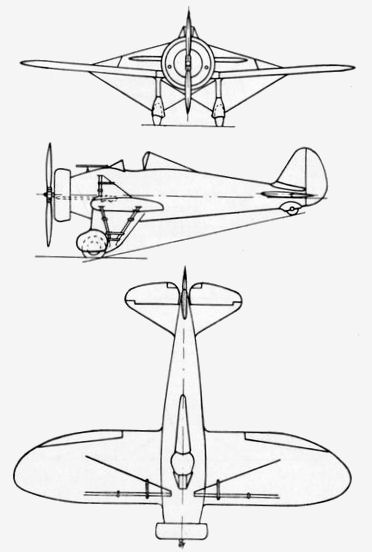
Boeing 281 3-view from L'Aerophile March 1935

Data from Aviation-history.com

General characteristics

- Crew: One
- Length: 23 ft 7 in (7.19 m)
- Wingspan: 28 ft (8.5 m)
- Height: 10 ft (3.0 m)
- Wing area: 250 sq ft (23 m^{2})
- Airfoil: Boeing 109
- Empty weight: 2,196 lb (996 kg)
- Gross weight: 3,360 lb (1,524 kg)
- Powerplant: 1 × Pratt & Whitney R-1340-27 Wasp 9-cylinder air-cooled radial piston engine, 600 hp (450 kW)
- Propellers: 2-bladed fixed-pitch propeller

Performance

- Maximum speed: 234 mph (377 km/h, 203 kn)
- Combat range: 360 mi (580 km, 310 nmi)
- Ferry range: 635 mi (1,022 km, 552 nmi)
- Service ceiling: 27,400 ft (8,400 m)
- Rate of climb: 719 ft/min (3.65 m/s)

Armament

- Guns: 2 × .30 in (7.62 mm) M1919 Browning machine guns or 1 x .30 in (7.62 mm) and 1 x .50 in (12.7 mm) machine guns
- Bombs: 2 × 100 lb (45 kg) GP bombs or 5 x 31 lb (14 kg) anti-personnel bombs

== See also ==
Aircraft of comparable role, configuration, and era

- Breda Ba.27
- Dewoitine D.500
- Grigorovich I-Z
- Mitsubishi A5M
- PZL P.11
- Vickers Vireo
- Vickers Jockey

Related lists

- List of fighter aircraft
- List of military aircraft of the United States

== Notes ==
Note 1: The "peashooter" nickname is generally believed to devolve from the long forward-facing tubular gunsight at the pilot's position, reminiscent of the toy blowpipe called a peashooter. According to aviation enthusiast Robert Guttman, though, the nickname is supposedly derived from the blast tubes of its two internally mounted machine guns (blast tubes being metal tubes which surround and extend forward from fighter machine gun barrels, to prevent structural or mechanical damage to the aircraft from the firing of the machine guns).

== Bibliography ==
- Angelucci, Enzo and Peter M. Bowers. The American Fighter. Sparkford, Somerset, UK: Haynes Publishing Group, 1987. ISBN 0-85429-635-2.
- Bowers, Peter M. Boeing Aircraft since 1916. Annapolis, Maryland: Naval Institute Press, 1989. ISBN 0-85177-804-6.
- Bowers, Peter M. Boeing P-26 Variants (Aerofax Minigraph 8). Arlington, Texas: Aerofax Inc., 1985. ISBN 0-942548-13-2.
- Bowers, Peter M. "The Boeing P-26A". Aircraft in Profile, Volume One, Part 2. Windsor, UK/Garden City, NY: Profile Publications/Doubleday, revised 4th edition, 1976. ISBN 0-85383-411-3.
- Crosby, Francis. "Boeing P-26." Fighter Aircraft. London: Lorenz Books, 2002. ISBN 0-7548-0990-0.
- Davis, Larry. P-26 (Mini in Action number 2). Carrollton, Texas: Squadron/Signal Publications Inc., 1994. ISBN 0-89747-322-1.
- Dorr, Robert F. "Boeing P-26 Peashooter". Air International, Vol. 48, No. 4, 1995, p. 239.
- Fitzsimons, Bernard, ed. The Illustrated Encyclopedia of 20th Century Weapons and Warfare (Volume 19). London: Purnell & Son Ltd, 1978, First edition 1971. No ISBN.
- Green, William and Gordon Swanborough. "Boeing's Fighter Finale... The Peashooter Chronicle". Air Enthusiast, Fourteen, December 1980 – March 1981, pp. 1–12, 73–75.
- Maloney, Edward T. Boeing P-26 "Peashooter" (Aero Series 22). Fallbrook, California: Aero Publishers Inc., 1973. ISBN 0-8168-0584-9.
- Maloney, Edward T. and Frank Ryan. P-26: History of the Famous Boeing P-26 "Peashooter" (Air Museum Historical Series). Hollywood, California: Challenge Publications, Inc., 1965.
- Pedigree of Champions: Boeing Since 1916, Third Edition. Seattle, Washington: The Boeing Company, 1969.
- Shores, Christopher, Brian Cull and Yasuho Izawa. Bloody Shambles: Volume one: The Drift to War to the Fall of Singapore. London: Grub Street, 1992. ISBN 0-948817-50-X.
- Wagner, Ray. American Combat Planes – Second Edition. Garden City, New York: Doubleday and Company, 1968. ISBN 0-370-00094-3.
