= Louie Yim-qun =

Republic of China Air Force pilot

Lei Yanjun
- 雷炎均
- Family photograph of "Clifford" Louie Yim-qun
- Born: Clifford Louie Yim-qun (Chinese: 雷炎均); 1914; Seattle, Washington, United States
- Died: October 19, 1999 (aged 84–85); Taipei, Taiwan
- Spouse(s): Hazel Ying Lee (李月英) †; Pearl Lowe
- Military career
- Allegiance: Republic of China; United States of America
- Branch: Republic of China Air Force
- Service years: 1933–74
- Rank: Lieutenant General
- Nickname: Clifford "Long-Legged" Louie
- Unit: 28th PS/5th PG
- Commands: 28h PS/5th PG
- Conflicts: War of Resistance/WWII: Battle of Shanghai; Battle of Nanking; Battle of Taiyuan; Battle of Canton; Battle of Wuhan; Battle of South Guangxi; Battle of Chengdu-Chongqing

"Clifford" Louie Yim-qun (Chinese: 雷炎均; Jyutping: leoi4 jim4 gwan1; pinyin: Léi Yánjūn; Taishanese: lui3 yiam5 gun1; 1914–1999), also known as Louie Yen-chung (Chinese: 燕中; pinyin: Yànzhōng), was a Chinese-American pilot and military officer in the Republic of China. Louie's father was from Taishan county, Guangdong, China, but Louie was born in Seattle, Washington. He obtained a private pilot's license at the Portland Flying School, Oregon, and went to China in 1933. One of the other pilots in Portland was Hazel Ying Lee, who later became his wife. She was the first Chinese American to volunteer for the Women Airforce Service Pilots. Louie died in 1999 in Taipei, Taiwan.

== Military career ==
Louie Yim-qun traveled to China to participate in the Second Sino-Japanese War. He became Deputy Commander of the 28th Fighter Squadron of the 5th Fighter Group in 1937, equipped with the Curtiss Hawk II, and first saw combat while stationed at Jurong Airbase in the Nanjing defense sector as the war between Japan and China broke out, and then transferring to the northern front of the war in China at the Battle of Taiyuan with Captain Chan Kee-Wong on September 16, 1937, he shot down a Nakajima Ki-4 on September 18. Louie would then be sent to the southern-front of the war in Guangdong province while transitioning into the Gloster Gladiator beginning in 1938; Louie shot down three Japanese aircraft during the war, while some sources credits Louie with five victories, but this cannot be verified.

While the wartime capital of China was pushed back to Chongqing following the Fall of Wuhan, both sea and land routes for badly needed war supplies and high-octane aviation fuel were mostly cut off, especially after the loss of Nanning in the Battle of South Guangxi and increasing threat of the Japanese invasion of French Indochina, Major Louie Yim-qun's 28th Fighter Squadron, now equipped with Polikarpov I-15 fighters, has been reassigned with the defense of Sichuan. On September 13, 1940, in what would be the introduction and first aerial combat engagement for the state-of-the-art new A6M "Zero" fighter, Maj. Louie led six I-15bis to join a formation 19 I-15bis and nine I-16s commanded by Major Cheng Hsiao-yu, Captain Yang Meng-ging and Captain Zhang Hong; they were engaged in a 1/2-hour long dogfight with 13 Zero fighters led by Lieutenant Saburo Shindo of the 12th Kokutai on an escort mission for 27 G3M "Nell" medium-heavy bombers on a raid against Chongqing. In the ensuing melee, Maj. Louie was seriously wounded, but managed to safely land his bullet-riddled I-15bis back in base, while Lt. Gao Youxin claimed a "Zero shot down", but in fact all Zeroes safely returned to base, with four damaged.

In the fall of 1942, Major Louie was sent to the United States and entered Staff and Command College. In 1945 he was sent to Karachi in British India as an instructor to Allied pilots. After the Japanese surrender, he went to Japan as a member of China's Military Commission in Japan. In the 1950s and 1960s, General Louie served as Chief Liaison Officer to the U.S. Garrison Command in Taiwan, Chief of Air Intelligence, and Chief of Operations, CG of the Combat Command, and Deputy C-in-C of the Chinese Air Force. In 1967 he became Deputy Chief of General Staff in the Ministry of National Defence. He was promoted from lieutenant general to general (2nd grade) in 1970.

== Business career ==
He retired from the military in 1974, and became CEO and then chairman of the board of China Airlines until 1978.

== Personal life ==
His first wife, Hazel Ying Lee, was killed in a flying accident at Great Falls, Montana, on November 23, 1944, while ferrying a P-63 from Buffalo, New York. In 1946 he wed Pearl Lowe in Shanghai's Holy Trinity Cathedral. They had two daughters and a son together: Eleanor Louie Piatt, Katherine Louie and Clifford Louie.

== See also ==
- Arthur Chin
