= Chinese Flying Club of Portland =

Historic flying school in Oregon

The Chinese Flying Club of Portland (CFCP) was a flying school founded in 1932 in response to the Japanese invasion of Manchuria. Donations totaling $20,000 came from around the world to fund the CFCP. It was initially housed at the Christofferson airport, but eventually moved to Swan Island Airport in Portland, Oregon.

The head instructor was Al Greenwood, and the club was sometimes referred to as the "Al Greenwood Flying School."

== Students ==
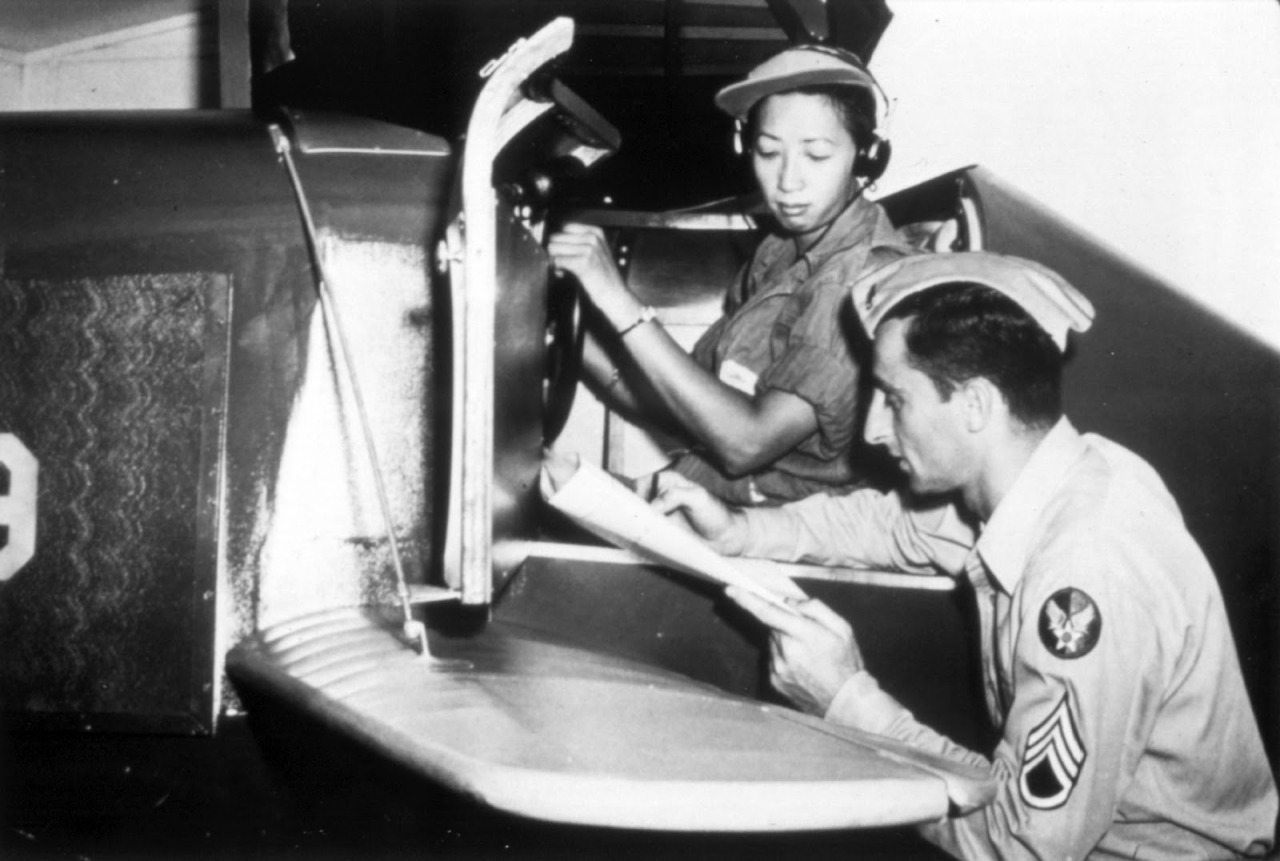
Hazel Ying Lee reviews her performance after a training session

Every CFCP student signed a pledge that they would be willing give up their life for China. A total of 32 Chinese-American students who had trained in Portland were sent to China. The first group of students departed for Canton, China in August, 1932. The second group, composed of 17 students, departed to join the air force of the national government of Northern China in March, 1933. Two died in China. The first was a woman, Virginia Wong, who died of malaria after arriving in China, but before beginning her campaign. And the second student, Millard Chung, died while practicing bombing in China.

Notable alumni include Hazel Ying Lee, John Wong Pan-Yang, Louie Yim-qun, and Arthur Chin.

== Chinese flying clubs ==
The Chinese Flying Club of Portland was probably the largest flying club and training school of Chinese-American pilots leading up to World War II. There were other clubs and schools around the country including the Chinese Patriotic Flying Club in Boston and the Chinese Aeronautical Association in Los Angeles.
