= Arthur Chin =

American military aviator (1913–1997)

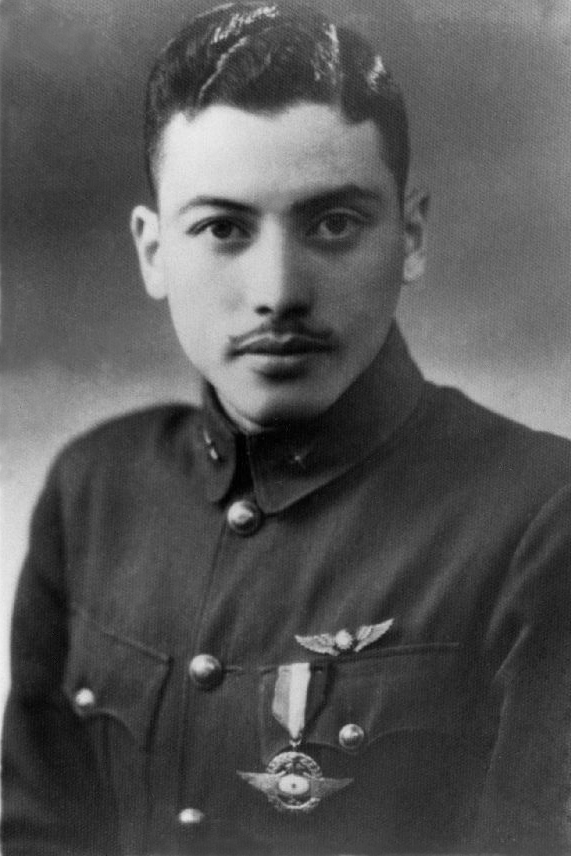
- Arthur Chin
- Born: October 23, 1913; Portland, Oregon, U.S.
- Died: September 3, 1997 (aged 83); Portland, Oregon, U.S.
- Spouses: Eva Wu †; Frances Murdoch; Vivienne Yang
- Military career
- Allegiance: Republic of China; United States
- Branch: Republic of China Air Force
- Service years: 1933–1945
- Rank: Major
- Nickname: Art
- Unit: Canton Provincial Air Force
- Conflicts: Second Sino-Japanese War/World War II: Battle of Shanghai; Battle of Nanking; Battle of Canton; Battle of Wuhan; Battle of South Guangxi; Burma Campaign ("The Hump")
- Awards: Distinguished Flying Cross; Air Medal
- Other work: Airline pilot, China National Aviation Corporation

Arthur Tien Chin (Chinese: 陳瑞鈿; Jyutping: can4 seoi6 tin4; October 23, 1913 – September 3, 1997) was an American fighter pilot and the country's first flying ace in World War II.

After Japan invaded China in 1931, Chin felt compelled to defend his father's homeland. He was part of the first group of U.S. volunteer combat aviators and fought in the Second Sino-Japanese War.

== Early life and military career ==
Chin was born in Portland, Oregon, to Fon Chin, who was from Taishan, Guangdong, and Eva Wong, who was of Peruvian background. Chin's birth certificate listed him as being "mulatto". Motivated by the Japanese invasion of China, Chin enrolled in flight school at the Chinese Flying Club of Portland in 1932. Along with 13 other Chinese Americans, including John "Buffalo" Huang Xinrui and Hazel Ying Lee, he left for China and joined the Canton Provincial Air Force under General Chen Jitang as the first and original group of American volunteer combat aviators. From there, he was sent to aerial-gunnery training with the Luftwaffe at Lagerlechfeld, Germany, then returned to China to see the Guangdong Provincial Air Force integrated into the central government's air force under the KMT.

As war broke out with the 1937 Battle of Shanghai, Chin flew in combat with the 28th Pursuit Squadron of the 5th Pursuit Group of Curtiss Hawk IIs led by Capt. Chan Kee-Wong, based in Jurong airbase (known to Cantonese-speaking pilots as Chuyung). He first engaged Japanese aircraft in the air on 16 August 1937. As IJN G3M medium-heavy bombers began their attack on Jurong airbase, Chin and Chan managed to take off in their antiquated Hawk IIs. Barely able to keep up with the fast G3Ms, Chin nevertheless scored many hits on what was likely the lead bomber of Buntaicho (flight leader) Lt. Osugi of Lt. Cmdr. Nitta's second Shotai of the Kanoya Kokutai, puncturing its fuel tanks and wounding a crewmember. Unfortunately for Chin, his slow Hawk II was an easy target for the G3M tail-gunners. After multiple hits from Japanese machine gun fire, his Curtiss-Wright Cyclone engine stopping two bullets, Chin broke off pursuit at the mouth of the Yangtze and made a forced landing on an airfield in Jiaxing (Chia-hsing). Osugi's G3M was hit 58 times with a gunner wounded. Realizing he could not make it back to Matsuyama airbase in Taiwan, Osugi considered turning back to land at the Japanese legation in Shanghai. Instead, he lightened the G3M by jettisoning equipment and anything that could be pried loose and headed for Cheju-do between the Chinese mainland and the southwestern coast of Korea, landing or crashing just as his fuel ran out. The G3M bomber was credited as Chin's first air-to-air "kill".

The 28th PS, 5th PG was split into two smaller squadrons to fight the Imperial Japanese advances on northern and southern fronts: Capt. Chan and half of the 28th went to Taiyuan, while Lt. Chin took the other half to Guangzhou. He would soon switch to the more powerful and much faster Gloster Gladiator fighter plane. He was credited with destroying nine enemy aircraft between 1937 and 1939.

In 1939, while flying a Gloster Gladiator, the fighter in which he scored 6.5 of his 8.5 aerial victories, he was hit by enemy fire and forced to bail out of his burning aircraft, and although he parachuted to safety, he suffered serious burns. After several years of surgery and recovery, and an escape from the Japanese occupation of Hong Kong, he returned to China in 1944 to fly supplies over the Himalayas, a route known as "The Hump".

== Later life and legacy ==
Chin is recognized as America's first ace in World War II. A half-century after the war ended, the U.S. government recognized Chin as an American veteran and awarded him the Distinguished Flying Cross and Air Medal. About a month after Chin died, on October 4, 1997, he was inducted into the Hall of Fame of the American Airpower Heritage Museum in Midland, Texas, as the first American ace of World War II.

After his aviation career, Chin became a postal worker in his hometown of Portland. On January 29, 2008, Congressman Representative David Wu (D-Oregon) introduced House Resolution 5220 to name a United States Post Office in Aloha, Oregon, after Chin: the "Major Arthur Chin Post Office Building". It was unanimously approved by the House Committee on Oversight and Government Reform. President George W. Bush signed it into law on May 7, 2008.
