= Hazel Ying Lee =

American aviator

- 李月英
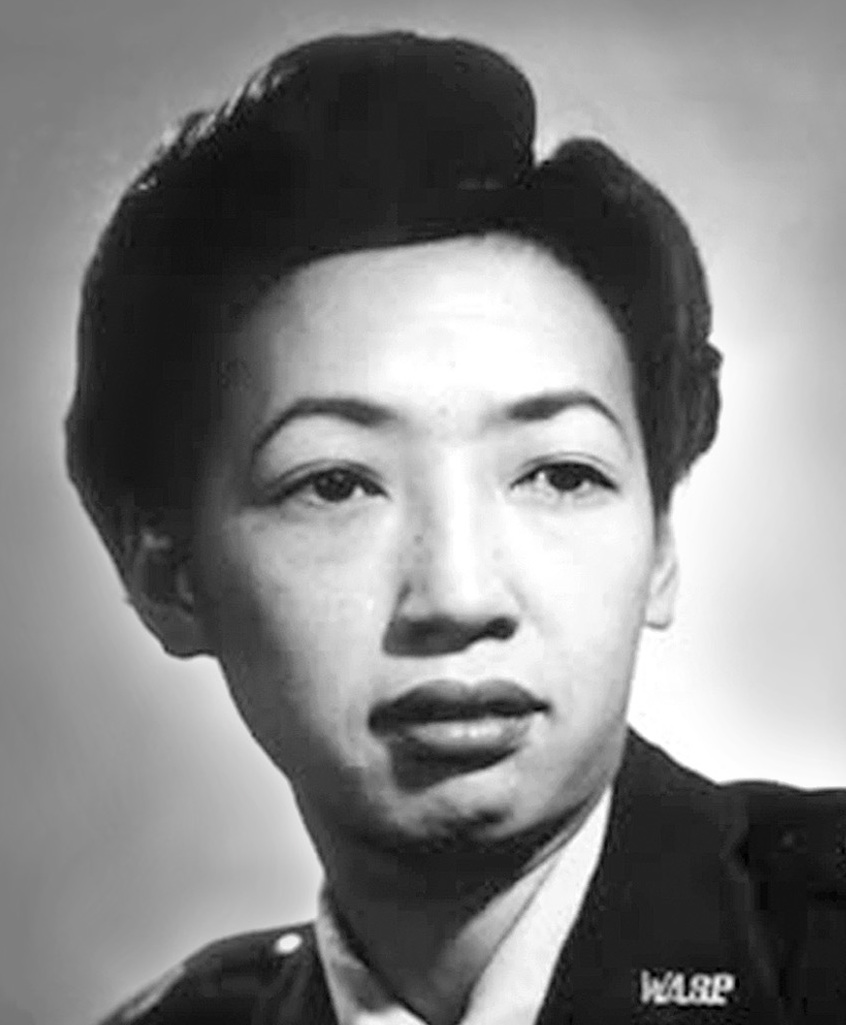
- Hazel Ying Lee
- Born: August 24, 1912; Portland, Oregon, U.S.
- Died: November 25, 1944 (aged 32); Great Falls, Montana, U.S.
- Cause of death: Plane crash
- Burial place: River View Cemetery, Portland, Oregon; 45.465°N 122.673°W
- Occupation: Pilot
- Era: World War II
- Organization: Women Airforce Service Pilots
- Spouse: Louie Yim-qun
- Parents: Yuet Lee (father); Ssiu Lan Wong (mother)

Chinese name
- Traditional Chinese: 李月英
- Simplified Chinese: 李月英
Transcriptions
Standard Mandarin
- Hanyu Pinyin: Lǐ Yuè yīng

Hazel Ying Lee (Chinese: 李月英; Jyutping: lei5 jyut6 jing1; pinyin: Lǐ Yuèyīng; August 24, 1912 – November 25, 1944) was an American pilot who flew for the Women Airforce Service Pilots (WASP) during World War II.

== Early life ==
Lee was born in Portland, Oregon. Her parents were Yuet Lee and Ssiu Lan Wong, first-generation Chinese Americans who had immigrated to Portland from Taishan, Guangdong. The family owned a Chinese restaurant in Old Town Chinatown. Lee's mother devoted her energy to raising eight children and helping with the family business.

Despite the widespread anti-Chinese bias of her time, Lee led a full and active life. She was involved in athletics such as swimming and handball, loved to play cards, and in her teenage years, learned how to drive. Following graduation from Commerce High School in 1929, Lee found a job as an elevator operator at Liebes Department Store in downtown Portland. It was one of the few jobs that a Chinese-American woman could hold during this time.

In 1932, Lee took her first airplane ride with a friend at an air show and was determined to learn to fly. She joined the Chinese Flying Club of Portland and took flying lessons with famed aviator Al Greenwood. Despite opposition from her mother, who saw no opportunity in the endeavor, Lee knew she "had to fly." In discussing Hazel's love of flying her sister Frances recalled: "It was the thought of doing something she loved. She enjoyed the danger and doing something that was new to Chinese girls."

In October 1932, Lee became one of the first Chinese-American women to earn a pilot's license. Author Judy Yung wrote of Lee and the other Chinese-American women pilots of that time, "Although few in number, these first Chinese American aviators, in their attempt to participate in a daring sport, broke the stereotype of the passive Chinese woman and demonstrated the ability of Chinese American women to compete in a male-dominated field."

While in Portland, Lee met her future husband "Clifford" Louie Yim-qun, who was also a pilot.

=== Time in China ===
Prior to World War II, in response to the Japanese invasion of Manchuria in 1933, Lee and several other Chinese Americans journeyed there with the goal of aiding the Chinese Air Force. Despite the great need for pilots at the time, the Republic of China Air Force would not accept a woman pilot. Because she was a woman, Lee was forced to take a desk job, flying only occasionally for a commercial Chinese company. Frustrated, Lee instead settled in Canton and spent the next few years flying for a private airline. At the time Lee was one of a very small number of women pilots in China.

In 1937, the Japanese forces invaded China. Lee remained in the country despite the war and was in Canton when hundreds of civilians were killed in Japanese air attacks. While bombs fell all around them, friends recall Lee's calm effort to find shelter for friends, neighbors and family, which allowed them all to survive the bombing attacks. In 1938, following another unsuccessful effort to aid the Air Force as a pilot, Lee, a non-citizen, knew she had to return to the United States, and did so after escaping the country to Hong Kong. In New York City, Lee got a job as a buyer of war materials for besieged China.

== WASP career ==
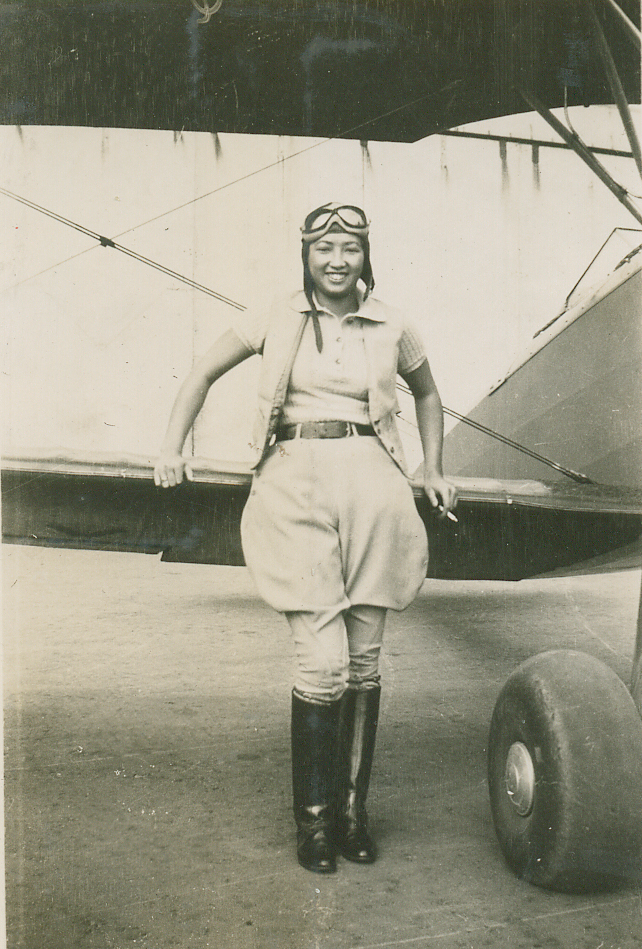
Hazel Ying Lee, 1932

After the Japanese attack on Pearl Harbor, America was drawn into World War II. As the war claimed the time and lives of American pilots, it became clear that there were not enough male pilots to sustain the war effort at home. With the ambivalent support of United States Army Air Force Commander Henry "Hap" Arnold, the Women Airforce Service Pilots or "WASP," was created in 1943, under the command of famed aviator Jacqueline Cochran.

Experienced women pilots like Lee were eager to join the WASP and responded to interview requests by Cochran. Members of the WASP reported to Avenger Field, in Sweetwater, Texas for an arduous six-month training program. Lee was accepted into the 4th class, 43 W 4. She was the first Chinese-American woman to fly for the United States military. During Lee's training, it was reported that she fell from the aircraft she was riding in when the instructor made an unexpected loop. Her seat belt wasn't fastened correctly at the time, and she saved herself by using her parachute. Lee landed in a field and walked back to the base dragging the parachute behind her.

Although flying under military command, the women pilots of the WASP were classified as civilians and were paid through the civil service. No military benefits were offered and when WASP pilots died in the line of duty, no military funerals were allowed. The WASPs were often assigned the least desirable missions, such as winter trips in open cockpit airplanes. Commanding officers were initially reluctant to give women any flying deliveries. It took an order from the head of the Air Transport Command to improve the situation.

Upon graduation, Lee was assigned to the Third Ferrying Group at Romulus, Michigan. Their assignment was critical to the war effort. They delivered aircraft, which were being manufactured in large numbers in converted automobile factories, to points of embarkation, where they would then be shipped to the European and Pacific War fronts. In a letter to her sister, Lee described Romulus as "a 7-day workweek, with little time off."

Lee quickly emerged as a leader among the WASPs. A fellow pilot summed up Lee's attitude in her own words: "I'll take and deliver anything." Lee was described by her fellow pilots as "calm and fearless" even during forced landings. One emergency landing took place at a wheat field in Kansas. A farmer, armed with a pitchfork, chased Lee around her plane as he was shouting to his neighbors that the Japanese had invaded Kansas. Evading his attack, Lee told the farmer who she was and demanded he stop. She was a favorite with her fellow pilots, known for her sense of humor and being mischievous. Lee often used her lipstick to inscribe Chinese characters on the tail of her plane and the planes of her fellow pilots.

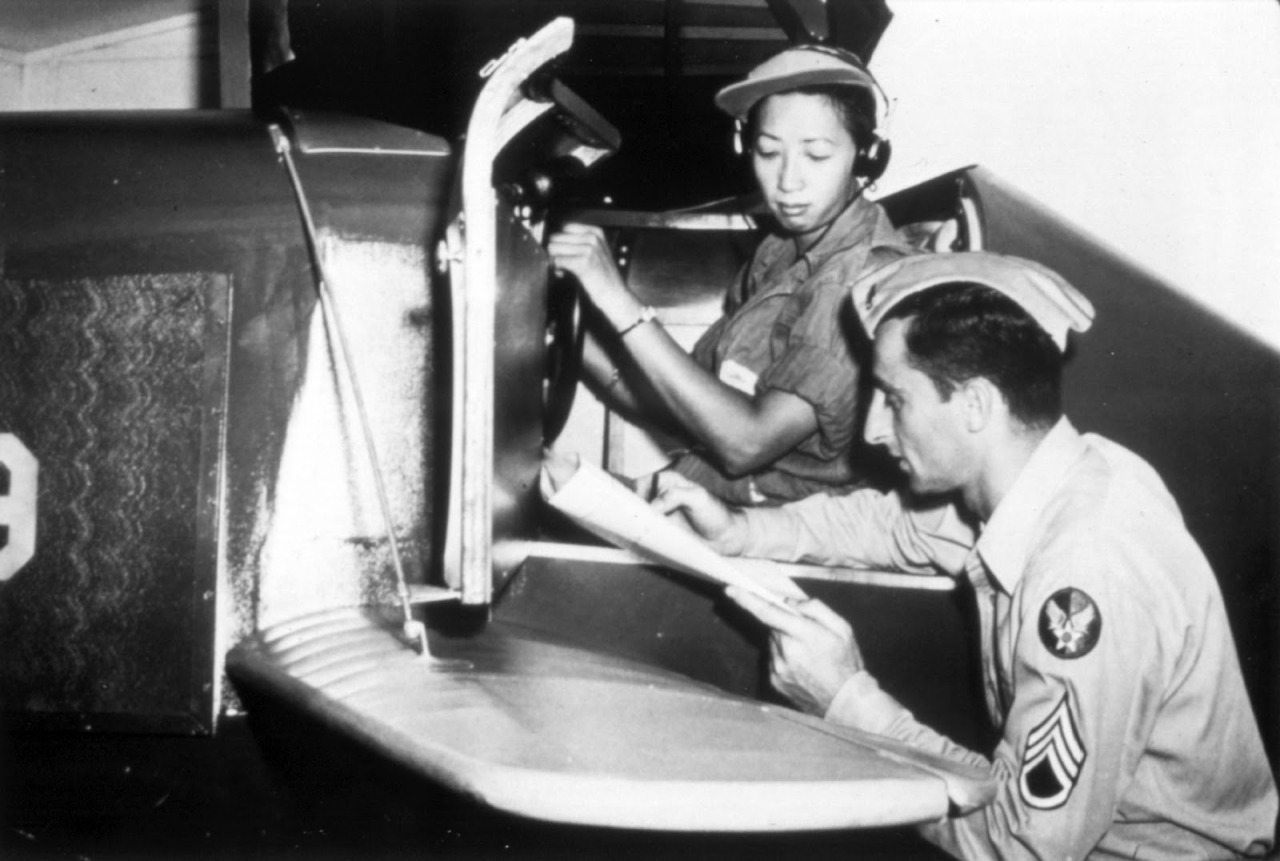
Hazel Ying Lee reviews her performance after a session in a Link trainer

Lee was known as a great cook and used Chinese cuisine as a way to introduce WASP pilots to Chinese culture. Fellow WASP pilot Sylvia Dahmes Clayton recalled: "Hazel provided me with an opportunity to learn about a different culture at a time when I did not know anything else. She expanded my world and my outlook on life."

In September 1944, Lee was sent to Pursuit School at Brownsville, Texas for intensive training. She was part of Class 44-18 Flight B and went on to be among the 134 women pilots who flew "Pursuit," that is faster, high powered fighters such as the P-63 Kingcobra, P-51 Mustang and P-39 Airacobra. Lee's favorite aircraft was the Mustang. Lee and these others were the first women to pilot fighter aircraft for the United States military.

=== Death ===
On November 10, 1944, Lee received orders to go to the Bell Aircraft factory at Niagara Falls, New York, where she was to fly a P-63 Kingcobra aircraft to Great Falls, Montana. During the war Lee and the other Pursuit pilots delivered over 5,000 fighters to Great Falls, which was a link in supplying Soviet allies fighting the Nazi forces with planes under the Lend-Lease program. From there, male pilots flew the fighters on to Alaska, where Soviet pilots waited to fly the planes to their home bases.

Bad weather delayed the mission at Fargo, North Dakota and on the morning of November 23, the weather cleared, allowing Lee to leave Fargo. Shortly after 2 p.m., Lee was cleared to land in Great Falls with a large number of P-63's approaching the airport at the same time. There was confusion on the part of the control tower, resulting in Lee's plane and another P-63 colliding. The aircraft were engulfed in flames and Lee was pulled from the burning wreckage of her airplane with her flight jacket still smoldering. Two days later, on November 25, 1944, Lee died from the severe burns she received in the accident.

Only three days after learning of her death, the Lee family in Portland received another telegram informing them that Hazel's brother Victor, who was serving with the Armored Forces, had been killed in combat in France. As they prepared to bury Hazel and Victor, the family picked out a burial site in a Portland cemetery. Hazel Lee was laid to rest in a non-military funeral and buried alongside her brother on a sloping hill in River View Cemetery, overlooking the Willamette River.

=== Legacy ===
For over three decades after the war, members of the WASP and their supporters attempted to secure military status for the women pilots. In March 1977, following United States Congressional approval of Public Law 95-202, the efforts of the Women Airforce Service pilots were finally recognized, and military status was finally granted. Thirty-eight WASP pilots died while in service during the years of World War II, and Lee was the last to die during the program. On July 1, 2009, she and all other WASP pilots, whether living, deceased, or killed during the war, were approved for a Congressional Gold Medal.

In 2004, Hazel Ying Lee was inducted into Oregon's Aviation Hall of Honor, a fraternity of native Oregonians who made historic contributions to aviation.

Lee has since been remembered for her legacy of fighting toward equality and inclusion, her bravery, and record of service. In 2003, PBS aired a documentary about Lee entitled, A Brief Flight: Hazel Ying Lee and The Women Who Flew Pursuit.

Derrick Wang's musical drama Fearless, inspired by the life of Hazel Ying Lee, received its world premiere at Opera Delaware in May 2025.

== Sources ==
- Gott, Kay. 1996. Hazel Ah Ying Lee, Women AirForce Service Pilot, World War II: a portrait. McKinleyville, CA (P.O. Box 2813, McKinleyville 95519): K. Gott.
