= List of World War II aces from China =

This is a list of fighter aces in World War II from the Republic of China.

== Aces ==
- John Wong Pan-yang – an American aviator who volunteered to serve in the Chinese Air Force in the looming war against the Japanese
- John "Buffalo" Huang Xinrui – an American aviator who volunteered to serve in the Chinese Air Force in the looming war against the Japanese

== Bibliography ==
- Cheung, Raymond. Aces of the Republic of China Air Force. Oxford: Osprey Publishing, 2015. ISBN 978 14728 05614.
