= Curtiss F11C Goshawk =

1932 biplane fighter aircraft family

F11C Goshawk
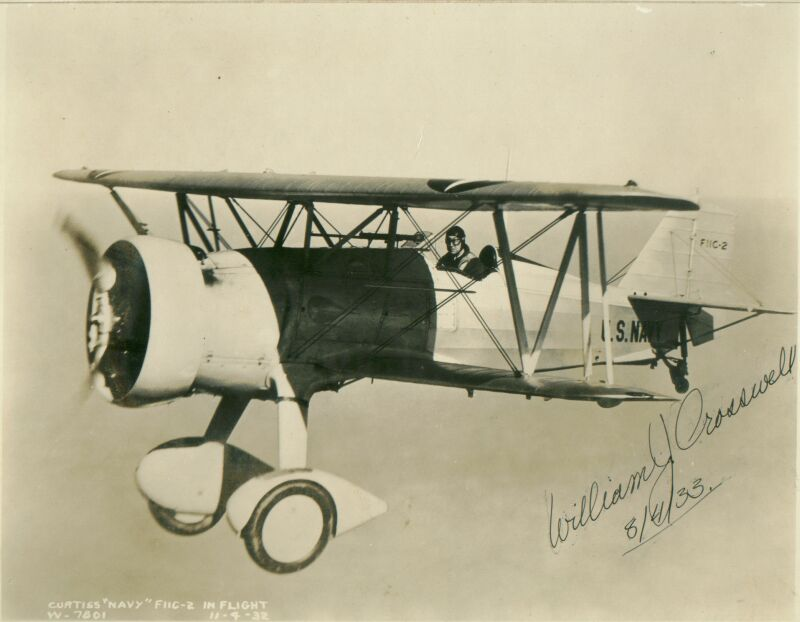
- XF11C-2 Goshawk during a test flight in November 1932.

General information
- Type: Carrier-based Fighter and fighter-bomber
- National origin: United States
- Manufacturer: Curtiss Aeroplane and Motor Company
- Status: retired
- Primary users: United States Navy Chinese Nationalist Air Force; Colombian Air Force
- Number built: 157 fixed undercarriage variants, 140 retractable undercarriage variants.

History
- Manufactured: 1932-1940
- Introduction date: April 1932
- First flight: September 1932
- Variant: Curtiss BF2C Goshawk

The Curtiss F11C Goshawk is a 1930s American biplane fighter aircraft. It was part of a long line of Curtiss Hawk airplanes built by the Curtiss Aeroplane and Motor Company for the American military and for export.

== Design and development ==
In April 1932, when Curtiss was planning the Model 35B, the United States Navy contracted with the manufacturer for an improved derivative of the Model 34C, F6C as the F11C. It contained major changes that included the 600 hp (450 kW) Wright R-1510-98 radial engine, single-leg cantilever main landing-gear units, a slight increase in the interplane gap, metal- rather than fabric-covered control surfaces, and armament based on two .30 in (7.62 mm) fixed forward-firing machine guns supplemented by a hardpoint under the fuselage for the carriage of a 474 lb (215 kg) bomb, or an auxiliary fuel tank. Curtiss designed the type as the Model 64 Goshawk, with the U.S. Navy designation XF11C-1 (later XBFC-1 after the adoption of the BF for Bomber-Fighter category). The aircraft was of fabric-covered metal construction, used the wing cell structure of the dismantled XP-23, and was delivered in September 1932.

Shortly before ordering the XF11C-1, the Navy had bought a company-owned Model 64A demonstrator. This had a Wright R-1820-78 Cyclone engine, slightly longer main landing-gear legs carrying wheels with low-pressure tires, a tailwheel in place of the tailskid, fabric-covered control surfaces on the tail, and external provision for underwing racks for light bombs as well as an under-fuselage hardpoint for either a 50 US gal (190 L; 42 imp gal) fuel tank or the crutch that would swing a bomb clear of the propeller disc before release in a dive-bombing attack.

Flight trials of this XF11C-2 (later redesignated as the XBFC-2) revealed the need for some minor changes. After these, the XF11C-2 became the prototype for the F11C-2, of which 28 were ordered as fighter-bombers in October 1932.

From March 1934, the aircraft were revised with a semi-enclosed cockpit and a number of other modifications before they received the revised designation BFC-2 in recognition of their fighter-bomber role The last aircraft in the XF11C-2 contract was converted to the prototype XF11C-3, incorporating a more powerful R-1820-80 engine and a hand-operated retractable landing gear.

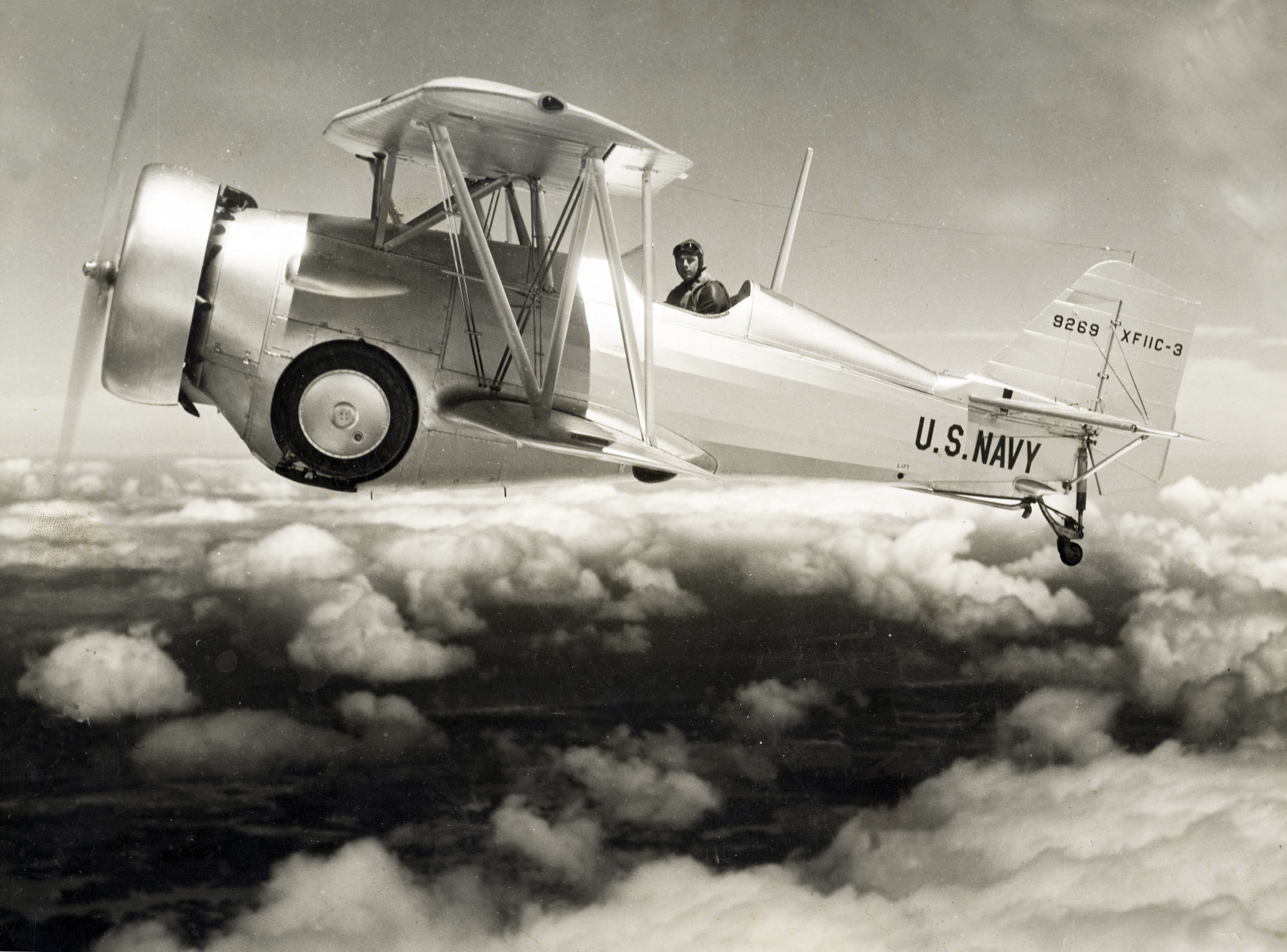
Curtiss XF11C-3 over the clouds with landing gear and tailhook retracted

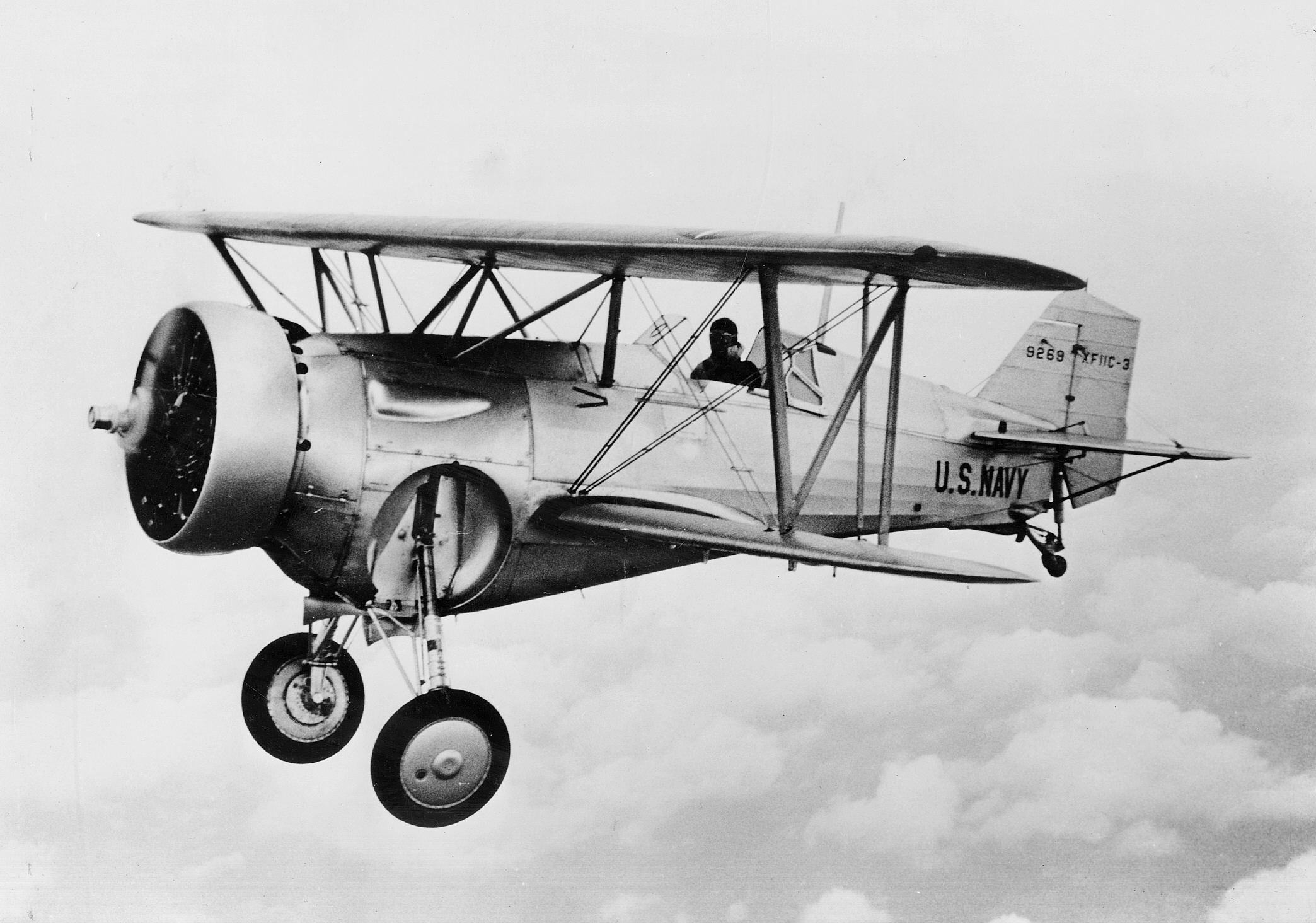
XF11C-3 Goshawk on a test flight

== Operational history ==
The only U.S. Navy units to operate the F11C-2 were the Navy's "High Hat Squadron", VF-1B, aboard the carrier USS Saratoga, and VB-6 briefly assigned to USS Enterprise. In March 1934, when the aircraft were redesignated BFC-2, the "High Hat Squadron" was renumbered VB-2B, and then VB-3B, and retained its BFC-2s until February 1938. VB-6 never embarked on Enterprise with its BFC-2 fighter-bombers.

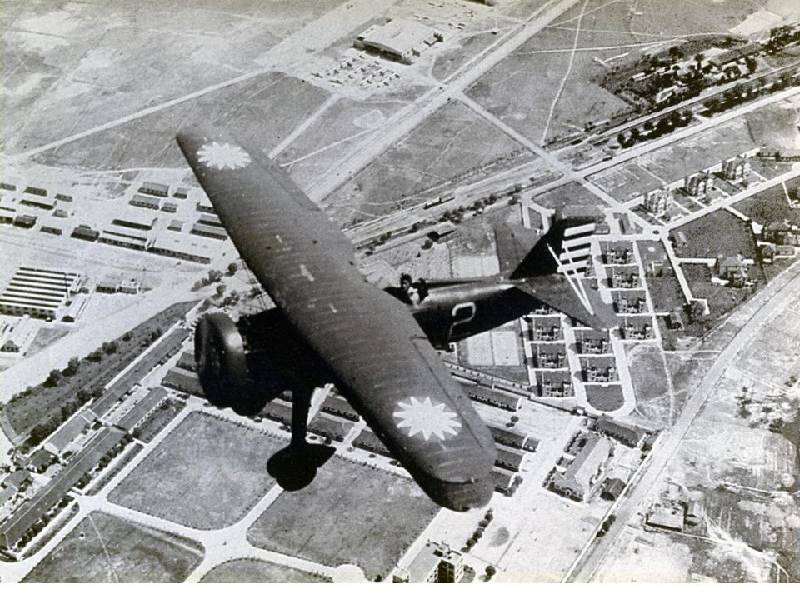
Chinese Hawk II during WW2

The F11C-2 Goshawk was produced in an export version as the Hawk II fighters. A slightly modified XF11C-2, the Hawk II was fitted with a Wright R-1820F-3 Cyclone rated at 710 hp (530 kW) at 1,676 m (5,499 ft) and 78 imp gal; 94 US gal (356 L) of fuel while the Hawk I had 42 imp gal; 50 US gal (189 L) of internal fuel. Both versions carried the same armament as the production F11C-2. The Hawk II was exported in quantity to Turkey, the first customer, who took delivery of 19 beginning in August 1932. Colombia ordered Hawk IIs at the end of October 1932 and receiving an initial batch of four twin float-equipped examples, the first of 26 floatplane fighters delivered by the end of July 1934. The Colombian Air Force used Hawk II on floats in the Colombia-Peru War in 1932-1933. Nine Hawk IIs were supplied to Bolivia, of which three had interchangeable wheel/float undercarriages, four were delivered to Chile, four to Cuba where they were used to create the Cuban 8 aerobatic manoeuvre, two went to Germany for experiments with dive bombing, one company demonstrator went to Norway while 12 Hawk IIs went to Siam.

The Chinese Nationalist Air Force received 50 Hawk IIs and fought against the Japanese during the Second Sino-Japanese War. One pilot at the 28th Squadron, 5th Fighter Group from Chuyung Airbase for the defense of Nanking at the outbreak of the war against the Imperial Japanese invasion, made a partial claim in the shooting-down of a Mitsubishi G3M heavy bomber on 15 August, 1937. Half of the squadron were dispatched to Taiyuan in the northern front of the war in China, and took part in the Battle of Taiyuan It was the main battlefield of the Hawk IIs and IIIs in World War II.

Siamese Hawk IIIs saw action during World War II, including against the Royal Air Force. On 8 April 1944, a Siamese Hawk III was shot down by a No. 211 Squadron RAF Bristol Beaufighter over Lamphun.

== Variants ==
=== Navy designations ===
XF11C-1 (Model 64)
First prototype which used a P-6E fuselage with XP-23 wings, and with a 600 hp (450 kW) Wright R-1510 radial engine.
XF11C-2 (Model 64A)
Second prototype, later redesignated XBFC-2, with a reduced chord engine cowling.
F11C-2 (Model 64A)
Production version, later redesignated BFC-2; 28 built.
BFC-2 Hawk (Model 64A)
Redesignation of fixed undercarriage F11C-2.
XF11C-3 (Model 67)
One aircraft fitted with manual retractable undercarriage in a substantially designed fuselage, and a 700 hp (520 kW) Wright R-1820-80 radial engine, later modified into XBF2C-1 Goshawk (model 67A) as a fighter-bomber.
BF2C-1 Goshawk (Model 67A)
Modification of retractable undercarriage F11C-3, with enlarged headrest with a partially enclosed cockpit, similar to that used on the Hawk III.

=== Curtiss designations for export models ===
Hawk II or Hawk model II (Models 35 and 47)
Export variant comparable to F11C-2 but with wood wing spars and a 600 hp (450 kW) Wright SR-1820F-2.
Hawk III or Hawk model III (Model 68)
Export variant comparable to F11C-3 but with detail differences, a 650 hp (480 kW) Wright R-1820, and a much larger headrest.
Hawk IV or Hawk model IV (Model 79)
Development of Hawk III with fully enclosed and redesigned cockpit and a 745 hp (556 kW) Wright R-1820 with new cowling.

=== Curtiss model numbers ===
Model 35
Hawk II production variant including 9 to Bolivia, 50 to China, 26 to Colombia, 4 to Cuba, 2 to Germany, 12 to Siam, 19 to Turkey, and 4 to Chile. (126+ built)
Model 47
Hawk II demonstrator NX13263 (1 built), later went to Norway
Model 64
XF11C-1 (1 built)
Model 64A
XF11C-2 and F11C-2 (29 built)
Model 67
XF11C-3 Goshawk (1 built)
Model 67A
XBF2C-1 Goshawk (1 modified)
Model 68
Hawk III to Argentina (10 built)
Model 68A
Hawk III company demonstrator NR14703 (1 built)
Model 68B
Hawk III to Siam (24 built)
Model 68C
Hawk III to China (102 built)
Model 79
Hawk IV (1 built)

=== Royal Siamese Air Force designations ===
B.Kh.9
(Thai: บ.ข.๙) Royal Siamese Air Force designation for the Hawk II.
B.Kh.10
(Thai: บ.ข.๑๐) Royal Siamese Air Force designation for the Hawk III.

== Operators ==
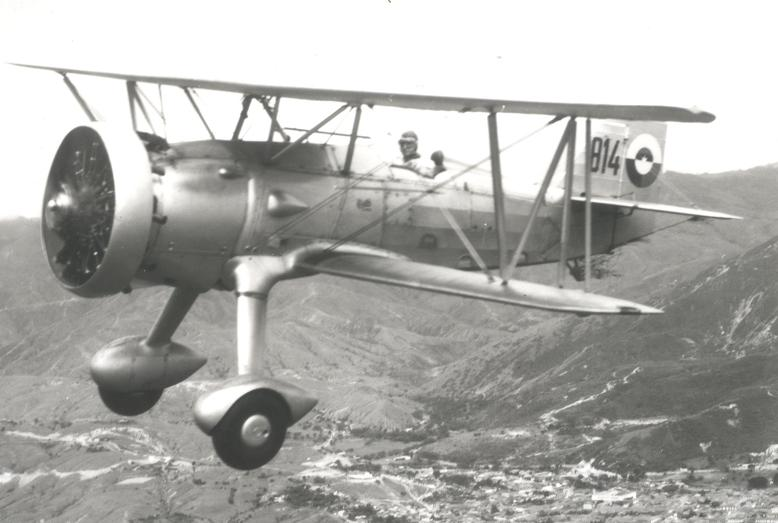
Colombian Air Force Hawk II during the Güepí Campaign.

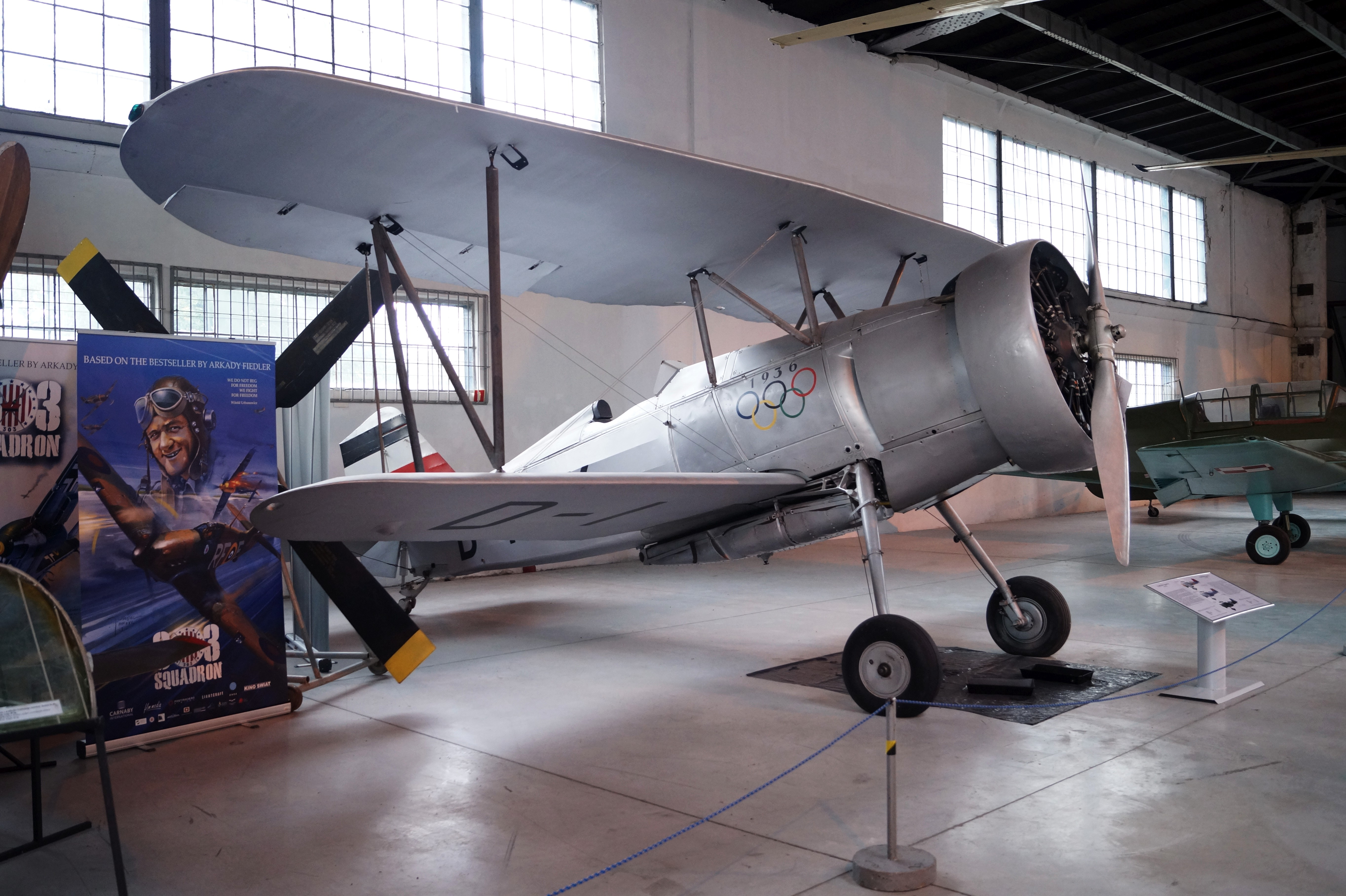
Udet's Hawk II (D-IRIK) on display in the Polish Aviation Museum.

Argentina

- Fuerza Aérea Argentina operated 10 Hawk IIIs and 1 Hawk IV.

Bolivia

- Fuerza Aérea Boliviana operated 9 Hawk IIs.

Chile

- Fuerza Aérea de Chile operated 4 Hawk IIs.

Republic of China

- Chinese Nationalist Air Force operated 50 Hawk IIs and 102 Hawk IIIs.

Colombia

- Colombiana Aviacion Militar - operated 26 Hawk IIs on floats, some in the Colombia-Peru War.

Cuba

- Cuban Air Force operated 4 Hawk IIs.

Germany

- Operated 2 Hawk IIs for evaluation. One was tested as a floatplane.

Norway

- Royal Norwegian Air Force - One company demonstrator Hawk II used for evaluation.

(Thailand) Siam

- Royal Siamese Air Force operated 12 Hawk IIs and 24 Hawk IIIs.

Turkey

- Turkish Air Force operated 19 Hawk IIs and 1 company demonstrator Hawk III.

Peru

- Peruvian Navy - Four Hawk IIs, three on floats, were purchased in March 1933, likely from Chile.

United States

- United States Navy operated 28 aircraft with VF-1B squadron, which operated for a period from the aircraft carrier USS Saratoga.

== Surviving aircraft ==
During the spring of 1933, Göring authorized funds to purchase two Hawk IIs for dive bombing trials. In October 1933 the pair arrived in Bremerhaven aboard the liner SS Europa. Ernst Udet used one of these in aerobatic exhibitions held during the 1936 Summer Olympics. That aircraft survived the war, and was eventually found in a field outside Kraków, and is now on display in the Polish Aviation Museum.

A BFC-2 is in the National Naval Aviation Museum on NAS Pensacola, Florida.

The sole surviving Hawk III was restored by the Royal Thai Air Force Museum. The aircraft is displayed with (Hanuman, white body) insignia identifying it as belonging to Wing 4.

== Specifications (F11C-2) & (BFC-2) ==
Data from Curtiss Aircraft 1907–1947, The Complete Encyclopedia of World Aircraft

General characteristics

- Crew: 1
- Length: 22 ft 7 in (6.88 m)
- Wingspan: 31 ft 6 in (9.60 m)
- Height: 9 ft 8.625 in (2.96228 m)
- Wing area: 262 sq ft (24.3 m^{2})
- Airfoil: root and tip: Clark Y
- Empty weight: 3,037 lb (1,378 kg)
- Gross weight: 4,132 lb (1,874 kg)
- Powerplant: 1 × Wright R-1820-78 Cyclone 9-cylinder air-cooled radial piston engine, 600 hp (450 kW)
- Propellers: 3-bladed metal propeller

Performance

- Maximum speed: 202 mph (325 km/h, 176 kn)
- Cruise speed: 150 mph (240 km/h, 130 kn)
- Range: 522 mi (840 km, 454 nmi)
- Service ceiling: 25,100 ft (7,700 m)
- Rate of climb: 2,300 ft/min (12 m/s)

Armament

- Guns: 2 × fixed, synchronized .30 in (7.62 mm) AN/M2 Browning machine guns in the forward fuselage
- Bombs:
  - 1 × 474 lb (215 kg) bomb on an under-fuselage hardpoint or
  - 2 × 117 lb (53 kg) bombs carried one under each lower wing

== Bibliography ==
- Bellomo, Sergio; Cordon Aguirre, Arturo; Marino, Atilio; Núñez Padin, Jorge (1999). Núñez Padin, Jorge Felix (ed.). Curtiss Hawk. Serie Fuerza Aérea Argentina (in Spanish). Vol. 5. Bahía Blanca, Argentina: Fuerzas Aeronavales.
- Eden, Paul and Soph Moeng. The Complete Encyclopedia of World Aircraft. London: Amber Books, 2002. ISBN 978-0-7607-3432-2.
- Hagedorn, Dan (March–May 1992). "Curtiss Types in Latin America". Air Enthusiast. No. 45. pp. 61–77. ISSN 0143-5450.
- Swanborough, Gordon and Peter M. Bowers. United States Military Aircraft Since 1911. Annapolis, Maryland: Naval Institute Press, 1976. ISBN 978-0-87021-968-9.
- Thomas, Andrew (2005). Beaufighter Aces of World War 2. Oxford: Osprey Publishing. ISBN 978-1-84176-846-5.
- Ward, John (2004). Hitler's Stuka Squadrons: The Ju 87 at War 1936-1945. Spellmount. ISBN 1862272468.
- Young, Edward M. (1984). "France's Forgotten Air War". Air Enthusiast. No. 25. pp. 22–33. ISSN 0143-5450.
