= Bombing of Chongqing =

1938–1944 Japanese air raids against Chongqing, China

Coordinates: 29.4814°N 106.9382°E

- Part of the interwar period, the Second Sino-Japanese War, the China Burma India Theater and the Pacific Theater of World War II
- The city during bombing, 1940
Date	18 February 1938 – 19 December 1944 (6 years, 10 months and 1 day)
Location	Chongqing city in the Republic of China

Belligerents
Nationalist government	Empire of Japan

Commanders and leaders
Chiang Kai-shek; Chen Cheng; Liu Zhi; Zhou Zhirou	Prince Naruhiko Higashikuni; Hajime Sugiyama; Takijirō Ōnishi

Units involved
41st and 42nd Anti-Aircraft Artillery Battalions; Nationalist Air Force; Soviet Volunteer Group (stationed October 1938 – December 1939)	(Empire of Japan) Imperial Japanese Army Air Service (Empire of Japan) Imperial Japanese Navy Air Service

Casualties and losses
100+ of fighters and other aircraft, aircrew and many more ground crew losses (incomplete data)	Dozens to 100+ of bombers and reconnaissance-attack/fighter aircraft shot down; hundreds of aircrew lost, some captured alive (incomplete data)
- 30,000+ civilian casualties including 10,000+ deaths, over 30,000 buildings and much of the city center destroyed; property losses amounting to 10 billion fabi yuan

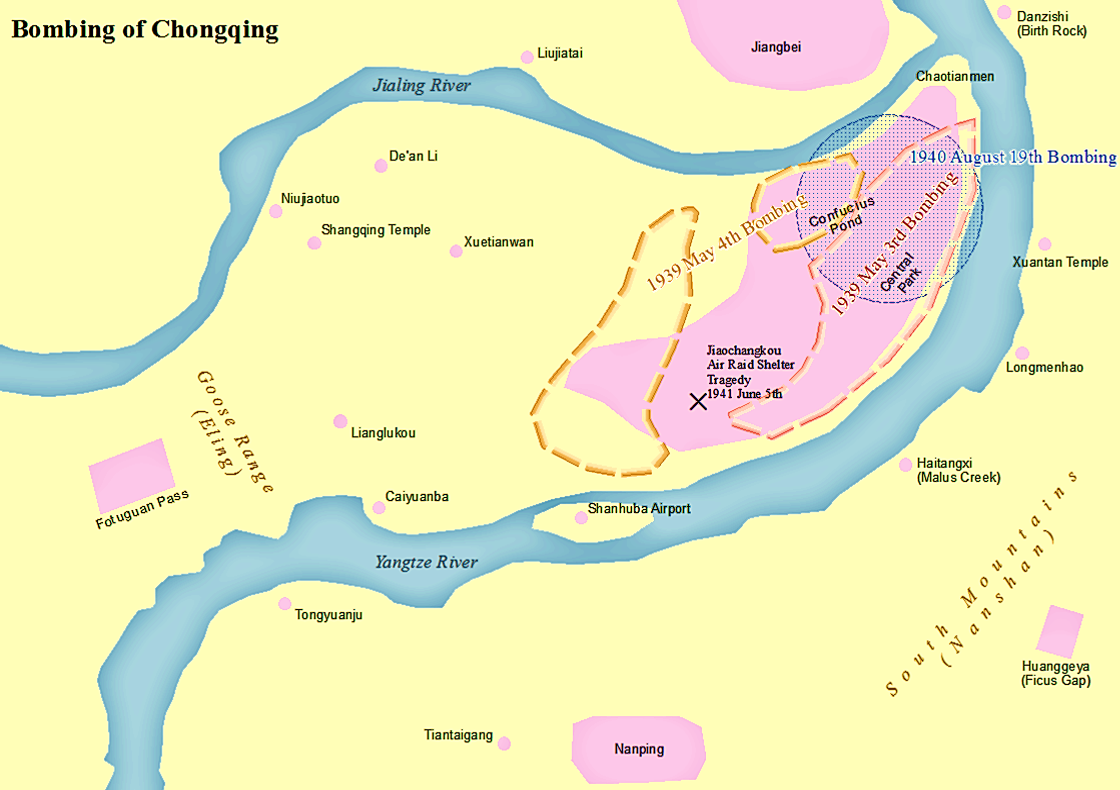
Map showing the concentrated bombing of Yuzhong Peninsula in central Chongqing, by Imperial Japan during World War II (Second Sino-Japanese War)

The bombing of Chongqing (simplified Chinese: 重庆大轰炸; traditional Chinese: 重慶大轟炸, Japanese: 重慶爆撃), from 18 February 1938 to 19 December 1944, was a series of massive terror bombing operations authorized by the Empire of Japan's Imperial General Headquarters and conducted by the Imperial Japanese Army Air Service (IJAAF) and Imperial Japanese Navy Air Service (IJNAF). Resistance was put up by the Chinese Air Force and the National Revolutionary Army's anti-aircraft artillery units in defense of the provisional wartime capital of Chongqing and other targets in Sichuan.

According to incomplete statistics, a total of 268 air raids were conducted against Chongqing, involving anywhere from a few dozen to over 150 bombers per raid. These bombings were probably aimed at cowing the Chinese government, or as part of the proposed Japanese invasion of Sichuan which ultimately never occurred.

== Opposing forces ==
=== China ===
The centralized command of the Republic of China Air Force integrated many former Chinese warlord air force aircraft and crews, and numerous Chinese-American and other foreign aviators volunteering for service with the Chinese Air Force. Nominally referred to as the Nationalist Air Force of China, at the outbreak of the air war in 1937 it was equipped mainly with US-made aircraft and training, as well as aircraft and training from other foreign sources, including Italian and Japanese army air force instructors. China was not an aviation industrial power at the time, and by the end of 1938 had suffered severe losses through attrition at the Battle of Shanghai, the Fall of Nanjing, the Fall of Taiyuan, and the Fall of Wuhan. The Chinese had found new hope in the lifeline of the Sino-Soviet Non-Aggression Pact of 1937, and Chinese Air Force pilots had almost completely transitioned into the Soviet-made Polikarpov I-15 and I-16 series of fighter-pursuit aircraft by early 1938. Along with a few remaining Curtiss Hawk IIIs which were China's frontline fighter-attack weapon of choice at the beginning of War of Resistance-World War II in 1937. A handful of other fighter-aircraft models were also available to the Chinese, including several Dewoitine D.510 fighters left by the defunct French Volunteer Group (the 41st PS), which was disbanded in October 1938 due to difficulties in combating the Mitsubishi A5M fighter. While the Chinese victory at the Battle of Kunlun Pass kept the Burma Road open, the ever increasing Japanese blockade of imports into China, particularly after Chongqing was cut off from the sea after losing Nanning in the Battle of South Guangxi, and with war now looming in Europe, the supplies needed by the Chinese were barely trickling in. Consequently, the Chinese Air Force had to make do with the increasingly poor flying performance and maintenance problems of these Soviet-made fighters burning low-grade 65–75 octane fuel in the first few years defending Chongqing and Chengdu while massive formations of Japanese aircraft benefiting from great technological advancements and burning 90+ octane fuel were flying ever-faster and higher, almost beyond practical reach of the obsolescent Chinese fighter aircraft; the British Royal Air Force for example were supplied directly by their own aircraft industry while benefiting from tremendous improvements in their fighter aircraft speed, acceleration and high-altitude performance by upgrading from the standard 87 octane fuel to the "secret 100 octane" formula later in the Battle of Britain.

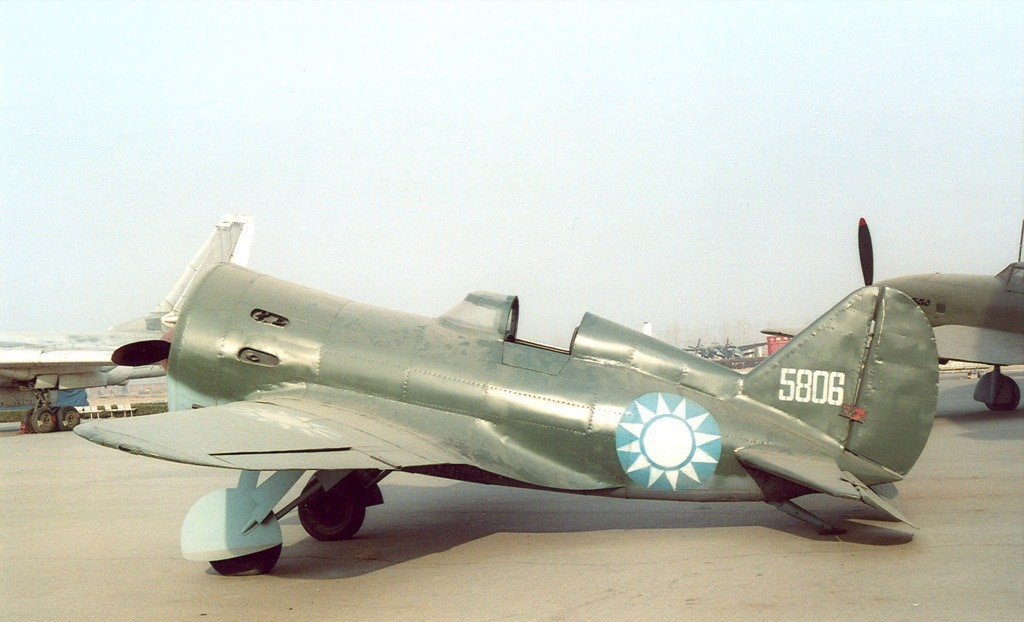
A surviving Chinese Air Force I-16 fighter at the Datangshan Aviation Museum

Primary and auxiliary airbases used by the Chinese Air Force in the Chongqing and Chengdu defense sector included Baishiyi Airbase, Fenghuangshan, Guangyangba, Liangshan, Shuangliu, Suining, Taipingsi, Wenjiang, and Xinjin, among others. There were 18 primary anti-aircraft artillery batteries positioned around Chongqing from 1939 to 1942, not including the air force's anti-aircraft gun units assigned specifically for the defense of the airbases.

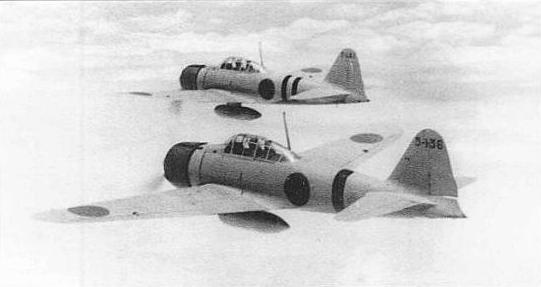
The A6M Zero; Japan's new air-superiority fighter in 1940

As the Chinese government and military forces fell-back and engaged the Japanese advances in new frontline operations in the beginning of 1938 at Wuhan, Taierzhuang, Guangdong and other main battle lines, the Imperial Japanese Army Air Force began harassing the deep-rear with exploratory strikes against the anticipated national fortress of Chongqing, while the Imperial Japanese Navy Air Force was hitting hard at the main battle-front of the temporary wartime-capital Wuhan. The exploratory strikes on Chongqing began on 18 February 1938, and continued sporadically at relatively low intensity until the commencement of "Operation 100" on 3 May 1939, when airbases of newly captured territories, specifically in Hubei province including Wuhan, allowed the Japanese to establish airbases and logistics to stage a sustained campaign of massively coordinated joint-strike operations with the Imperial Japanese Navy Air Service heavy bomber units. The introduction of the Mitsubishi A6M Zero fighter in 1940, the most advanced fighter aircraft produced at the time, ensured the Japanese practically complete air supremacy. U.S. support for China had begun in earnest in 1941 following the Japanese invasion of French Indochina, with the oil and steel embargo against Japan, and consequently, the Japanese raid on Pearl Harbor; beginning in 1942, barrels of 100-octane avgas began to increasingly trickle into China through the cross-Himalayan air-route known as "The Hump" – mostly destined for United States Army Air Force (USAAF) operations – and the Chinese Air Force were provided with new American Republic P-43 Lancer pursuit planes, which in theory with its very fast high-altitude performance and good firepower from its four 50 cal (12.7 mm) M2 Browning machine guns, was quite the upgrade the Chinese Air Force needed to effectively hit back at the Japanese raiders, but it was proven to be extremely unreliable and may have killed more of its own pilots than the enemies, including veteran pilot and 4th PG CO Major Zheng Shaoyu whose P-43 caught fire during a ferrying flight back to combat operations in China and was killed in the ensuing crash.

Chongqing's mountainous topography provided significant opportunities for building air-raid shelters, although digging them required difficult manual labor. Critical infrastructure was protected underground, including factories, government facilities, and Chongqing's radio station.

=== Japan ===
The majority of the Japanese air raids conducted against Chongqing and other targets around Sichuan were made with squadrons of medium-heavy bombers composed of IJNAF Mitsubishi G3M variants, known under Allied codename "Nell" and the IJAAF Mitsubishi Ki-21 "Sally"; others include the Fiat BR.20 Cicognas ("Ruth"), Kawasaki Ki-48 "Lily", and Nakajima B5N "Kate". Prior to the departure of the crack Japanese naval air units in China for the Pacific War in mid-late 1941, the new successor to the G3M bomber, the Mitsubishi G4M "Betty" and the Aichi D3A dive-bomber were operationally tested in the bombing of Chongqing, followed by newer designs such as the Mitsubishi Ki-67 "Peggy", Nakajima Ki-49 "Helen", and Yokosuka P1Y "Frances" (successor to the G4M), which were deployed in the following years as the bombing of Chongqing continued.

== Raids ==
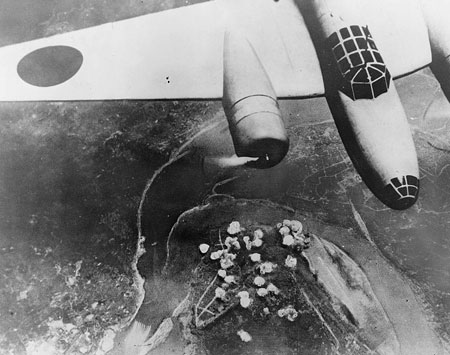
A photograph taken by IJA reporters on 16 June 1940 and published in the Asahi Shimbun showing bombs from IJAAF Type 97/Ki-21 (九七式重爆撃機) heavy bombers exploding on Yuzhong Peninsula

In the first two days of the Operation 100 (100号作战) bombing campaign, 54 and 27 Japanese bombers raided Chongqing on 3 and 4 May 1939 respectively, dropping approximately a 3:2 ratio of Type 98/25 high explosive "land bombs" (98 dropped on day one) and Type 98/7 incendiary bombs (68 dropped on day one). The first raid killed almost 700 residents and injured 350 more. Major Deng Mingde led the 22nd Pursuit Squadron (of the 4th Pursuit Group) Polikarpov fighters against the bombers on 3 May, shooting down seven bombers but losing two pilots including his deputy commander, the veteran Zhang Mingsheng. Zhang tried to save his damaged plane, but it became engulfed by fire, and while bailing-out and parachuting to safety, he was severely burned; he was then attacked by locals who thought he was a Japanese airman as he laid on the ground, barely able to mutter a sound to identify himself, and rescued four hours later, succumbing to his battle wounds the following day in a hospital.

The pre-dawn attack on 4 May resulted in far more casualties, with over three thousand deaths, injuring almost 2,000 more, and leaving about 200,000 homeless. Although the attacking force was smaller and dropped fewer bombs, there was no interception of the bombers by the Chinese Air Force whose airbases in the Chongqing region were not yet set up for nighttime operations.

Two months later, after tens of thousands of deaths, in retaliation for firebombing, the United States embargoed the export of airplane parts to Japan, thus imposing its first economic sanction against that nation.

The Japanese began to embark more nighttime bombing raids against Chongqing in summer of 1939 in an effort to reduce confrontation and casualties from defending Chinese Air Force fighters; however, the Chinese pilots began operating nighttime interceptions over Chongqing with some success in shooting down the nighttime bombers using "lone wolf" fighter tactics previously deployed during the Battle of Nanking two years earlier (and similar to the Wilde Sau tactics the Luftwaffe would deploy a few years later). The interceptions involved the coordination with a series of manually operated ground-based searchlights illuminating and tracking incoming bombers which can then be seen and targeted by the solitary fighter pilot; fighter ace Liu Zhesheng shot down a bomber on the night of 3 August 1939 flying "lone wolf" in an I-15bis during such a nighttime interception mission over Chongqing, among several other kills he claimed while battling for the defense of Chongqing. In the following night, Capt. Cen Zeliu would also claim a nighttime kill of a bomber while at the controls of an I-15bis.

"The Japanese bombers appeared over Chungking on moon-lit nights when they could easily see the major landmarks... from time to time, on command of their formation leader, all the bombers would open up a defensive barrage of fire in direction most likely of attack by fighters. The performance was effective. It was like a gigantic broom of fire sweeping the starry sky."

— K. Kokkinaki, Soviet pilot, witnessing the spectacle of night-time air-raids over Chongqing in 1939

Monks of the Ciyun Temple contributed greatly to rescuing and saving lives of residents over the course of the half-decade-long bombing campaigns over Chongqing.

Some foreign journalists and diplomats who witnessed the bombing of Chongqing described it as "China's apocalypse".

By mid-1940, the IJNAF G3M Model 21 bombers that formed the primary aircraft of the carpet-bombing campaign against Chongqing and Chengdu had become largely relegated to nighttime bombing attacks, while daylight raids were being replaced with the new and improved Model 22/23 G3Ms equipped with the higher-octane rated and supercharged Kinsei 51 engines, boosting the power of each of the twin-engined bombers by 500 horsepower and greatly enabling the schnellbomber strategy further above the general obsolescence of the defending Chinese fighter aircraft now struggling to gain speed and altitude to make even a single head-on pass against the high-speed/high-altitude IJNAF bombing runs, and even more vulnerable to the massed-firepower of those heavy bomber formations.

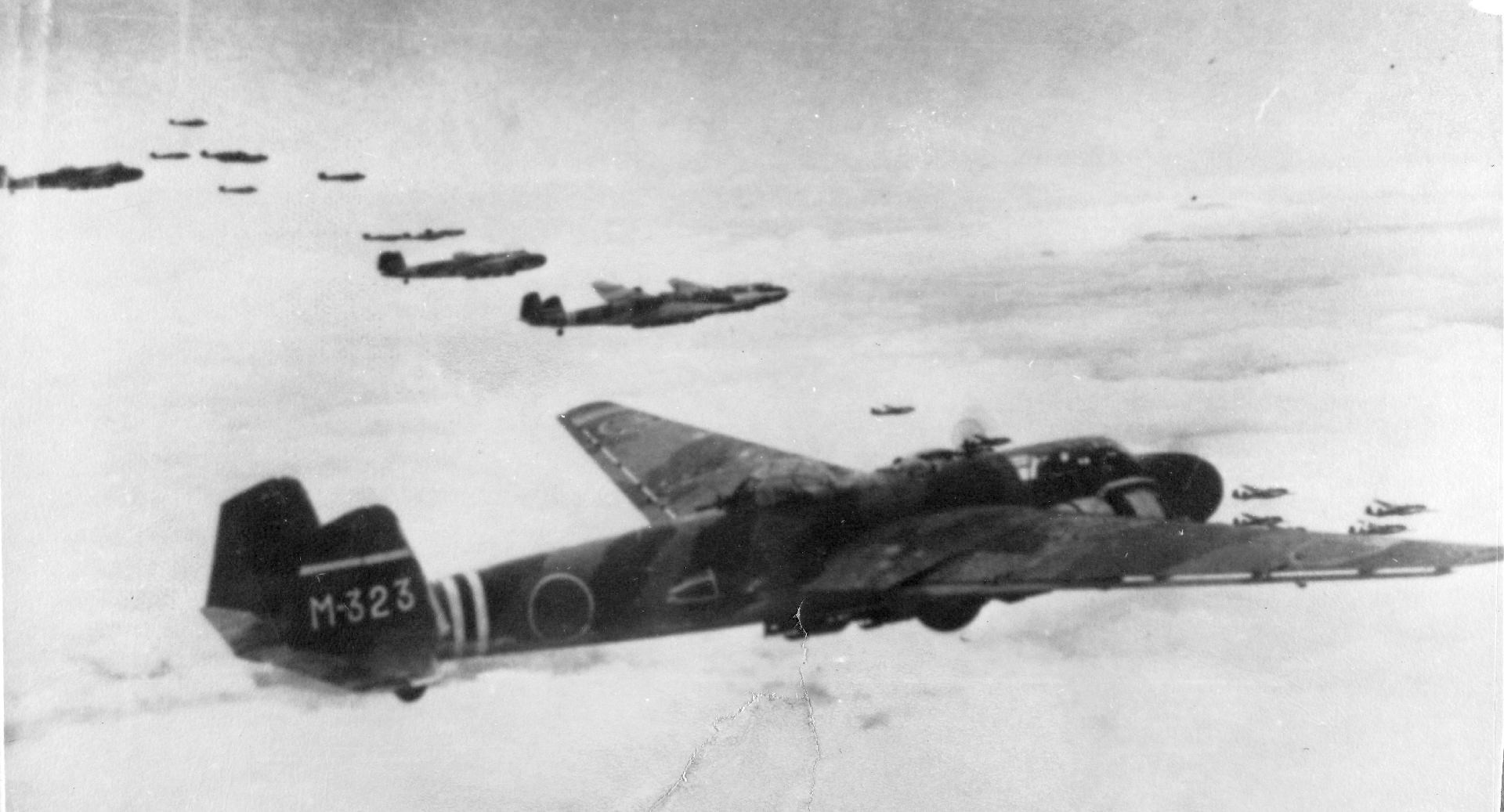
The vastly improved IJNAF Type 96/G3M Model 22 placed the defending Chinese fighter aircraft, and anti-aircraft artillery at an even greater disadvantage

Also by mid-1940, the Japanese had employed new tactics to stave off attacks from defending Chinese fighters; the Chinese air raid early warning network would alert the Chinese fighter squadrons to scramble their fighters toward approaching Japanese bomber formations (ideally with ample time to attain sufficient altitude ahead of the raids); however, they were being monitored by fast IJNAF C5M (IJAAF designation Ki-15) scouting-attack planes at high altitudes which would radio instructions to the bombers to circle out of range as the Chinese fighters rose to meet the bombers; once the Chinese fighters had run low on fuel and returned to base, the scouts would then redirect the bombers to attack the Chinese fighters on the ground refueling. While the Chinese soon cracked the code used by the C5M crews relaying messages to the bomber formations, some of the countermeasures used by the Chinese pilots were to launch a pair of I-16s that were almost fast enough to intercept the C5M in pursuit, but enough to force the scouts away, while a second flight of fighters were launched against returning Japanese bombers as the first flight of Chinese interceptors returned to disperse in smaller auxiliary airbases to refuel, although successful interceptions were still limited against the IJNAF bombers as the Polikarpovs struggled in particular against the new Model 22/23 G3M bombers.

A C5M and three G3Ms were shot down over eastern Chongqing on 20 May 1940 by the 24th PS, the 4th PG equipped with the few (10 in total) 20mm ShVAK cannon-armed and more-powerful M-25V engined I-16 Type 17 fighters that the Chinese Air Force had; unfortunately, two of the I-16 Type 17s were put out of action following the battle, having been shot-up by the defensive fire from the Japanese raiders and making forced landings.

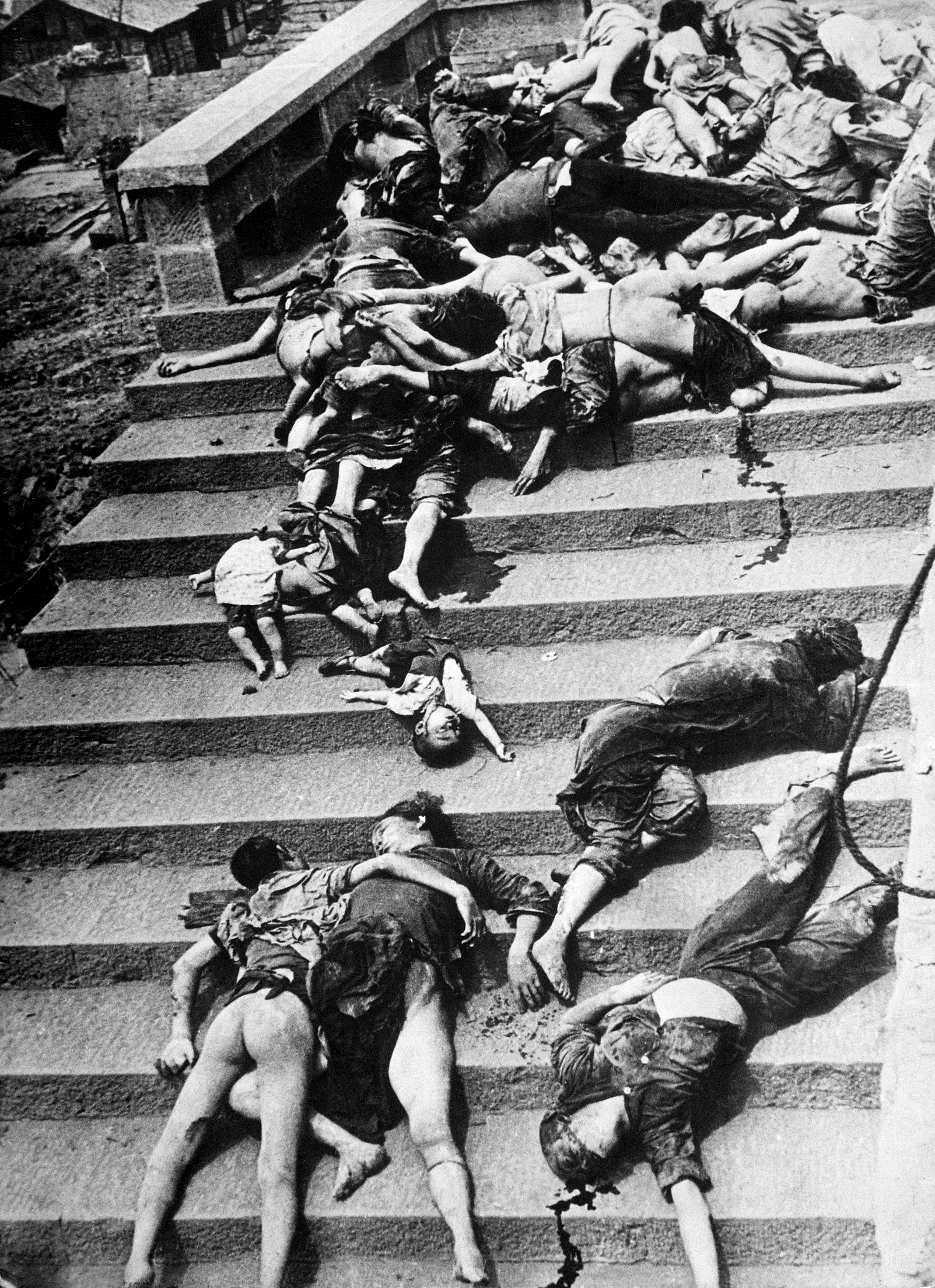
Casualties of a stampede during a Japanese air raid in Chongqing in 1941.

The Japanese air raids against Chongqing had become increasingly intense and destructive as the "joint air strike force" of the Imperial Japanese Army and Navy bomber formations began to comprise upwards of 150–200 bombers per raid, under the new codename "Operation 101" (101号作战), and massed defensive machine gun and cannon fire from the bomber formations were very effective against the slow Chinese fighter aircraft further handicapped with burning low-grade fuel, much of which came by way of French Indochina and processed locally; locally sourced oil came by way of the Yumen Laojunmiao oil wells in Gansu province beginning in the summer of 1939, which produced 90% of the native petrol (250,000 tons) for China during those war years.

The Japanese warned foreign delegations in Chongqing to avoid being hit as collateral damage in the massed attacks by moving to pre-defined "secure areas" which would be exempt from bombing; a large Nazi flag was emblazoned on the roof of the German embassy in Chongqing, but was still hit by a Japanese air raid.

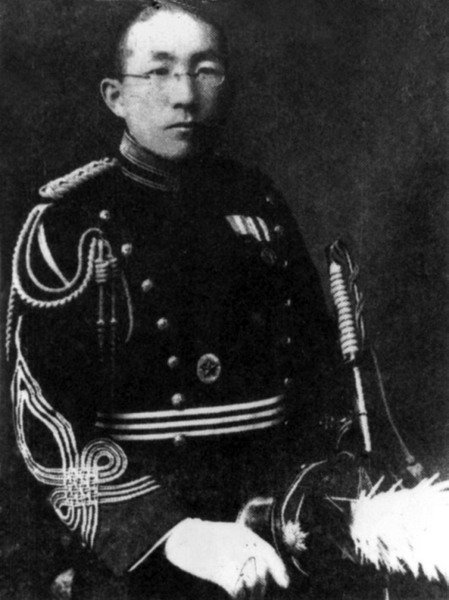
Lt. General Saburō Endō who represented the Imperial Japanese Army Air Service during the Operation 101 and 102 joint-strike bombing campaigns, led a targeted aerial-assassination strike on Generalissimo Chiang Kai-shek on 30 August 1941; he would put forth his "Futility of the Chongqing Bombing Thesis" (重慶爆擊無用論) days after the failed assassination strike, and gained a reputation as a post-war anti-war pacifist, establishing the China-Japan Servicemen's Devotion Society (日中友好军人协会)

Following the defeat of France by Germany in June 1940, the French Vichy Government submitted to the demands of the Japanese – allowing Japanese troops to conduct cross-border raids into Yunnan province, and the stationing of Japanese army air units at three airbases in French Indochina (now Vietnam), including Lạng Sơn.

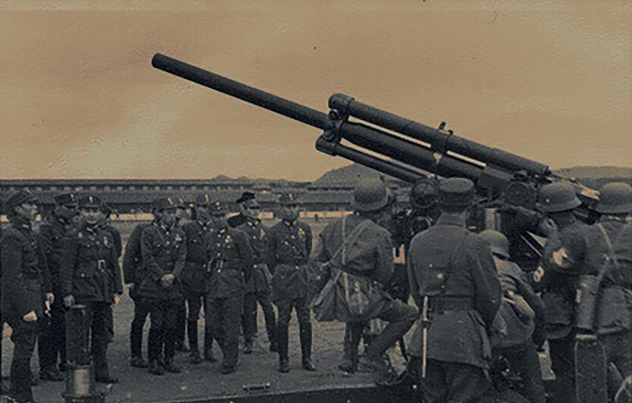
M1929 Anti Aircraft Artillery with the Nationalist Chinese Air Defence Troops

On 10, 12 and 16 June 1940, the Japanese raided Chongqing with 129, 154 and 114 bombers on these days respectively, while the Chinese I-15 and I-16 fighter squadrons engaged these attacks shooting down 13 of the raiders, perhaps more importantly, forcing bombers to miss their targets, although these disrupted flights of bombers may have evaded the Chinese fighters from their primary targets, and diverted out to drop bombs on secondary targets, including other large population and industrial areas such as Ziliujing and Luxian. The Chinese would be dealt with a serious blow a few weeks later in July 1940 when the British yielded to Japanese diplomatic pressure and closed the Burma Road, which was China's primary lifeline for material and fuel needed in the defense of Chongqing and Chengdu.

On 11 August 1940, 4th PG CO Maj. Zheng Shaoyu personally selected a team of five of his top fighter pilots, including ace fighter pilot Capt. Liu Zhesheng and future ace Lt. Gao Youxin to deploy a new weapon in an experiment to help with the dispersal of, and attacks against, the massive Japanese bomber formations: multiple air-burst bombs developed by combat flight instructor Yan Lei of the Central Air Force Academy at the Wujiaba Airbase. At 13:56 hours that day, 90 G3M bombers appeared in two waves, and Maj. Zheng's team, with ample preparations, maneuvered high and above the approaching bomber formation with precision flying while the Japanese aircrews observed the unusual movements of the Chinese fighters, who soon dropped the air-burst devices that descended under parachutes, and detonating just a few hundred meters in front of the lead bombers, resulting in a breakup of the bomber formation followed by furious attacks from the Chinese fighter pilots the best they could with the handicap of the highly challenged performance and firepower of their Polikarpovs, claiming five shot down (two wrecks confirmed) and damaging many others; eight Chinese fighters suffered various degrees of damage while the wreckages of Japanese bombers were found in Shichuxian and Shuangqing with three of the seven-man crew in one of the bombers found alive and taken prisoner.

The state-of-the-art new Japanese Mitsubishi A6M Zero fighters were first deployed into combat in course of the Chongqing and Chengdu bombing raids, and received its first baptism of fire in aerial combat on 13 September 1940; 13 Zeroes of the 12th Kokutai led by Lieutenant Saburo Shindo which had escorted 27 G3M bombers on a raid into Chongqing were sent against 34 Chinese fighters: including Polikarpov I-15bis (led by Maj. Louie Yim-qun of the 28th PS) and I-16 (led by Capt. Yang Mengjing of the 24th PS) and other Polikarpov fighters of Maj. Zheng Shaoyu's 4th PG. The battle lasted about half an hour by which point the Chinese were low on fuel and had to break off; with some luck, escaping further contact with the much faster Zeroes. Many of the Polikarpovs were damaged or shot down (the Zero pilots claiming "all 27 Polikarpovs" shot down), with ten pilots killed, and eight wounded, Maj. Zheng Shaoyu and Lt. Gao Youxin managed to drive Zeroes off the tails of other Chinese fighters, with Lt. Gao closing-in to 50 meters (160 ft) of one, and claiming a Zero shot-down, but in fact only four Zeroes suffered some damage, and all 13 safely returned to base in Wuhan.

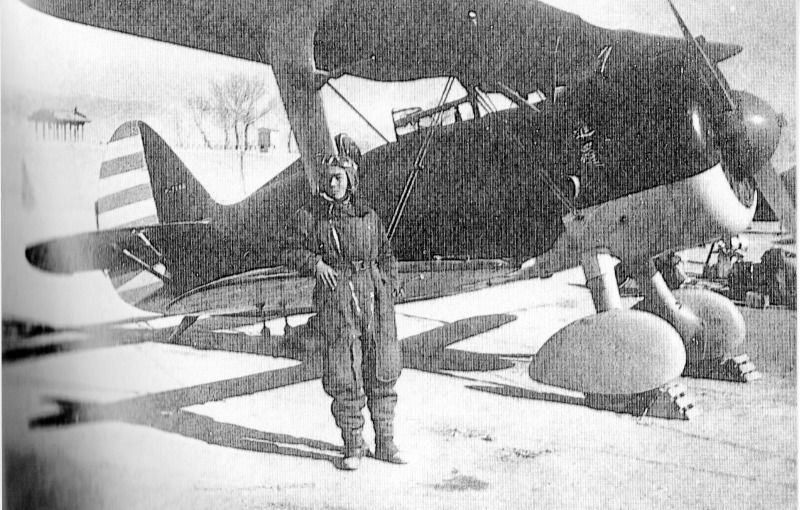
Fighter pilot Xu Jixiang of the 17th PS, 5th PG leaning on an I-15bis, the plane he flew against the A6M Zero's debut air-battle on 13 September 1940, fighting-off numerous attacks by the confounding performance of the new air-superiority fighter, and surviving; Xu would exact a measure of personal revenge on 4 March 1944 when he shot down an A6M Zero over the Japanese airbase at Qiongshan, Hainan, while flying a P-40 Warhawk with the CACW

As the already desperate situation was now irrefutable with the scourge of the new Zero fighters, the Chinese Air Force high-command issued an all-points bulletin to avoid combat engagement against the new air-superiority fighters; however, Chinese fighters would continue with fatalistic courage to face the Zero on numerous occasions, including another large-scale dogfight over Chengdu on 14 March 1941 that saw the Japanese Zero fighters employ new tactics to avoid near-deadly mistakes from the 13 September 1940 air battle experience; the intense dogfight over Chengdu was another devastatingly dark day in the tragic chapters of the Chinese Air Force in the war, as eight pilots were killed, including top-ace fighter pilots Maj. John Huang Xinrui and Capt. Cen Zeliu, along with the young 2nd Lt. Lin Heng (younger brother of renowned architect Phyllis Lin Huiyin).

In response to the Japanese invasion of French Indochina, the Empire of Japan was finally met with the U.S. scrap metal and oil embargo against Japan and the freezing of Japanese assets in summer of 1941.

On 5 June 1941, amid the increased brutality of the new Operation 102 bombing campaign to force the Chinese to capitulate in their war of resistance, the Japanese flew more than 20 sorties, bombing the city for three hours. About 4,000 residents who hid in a tunnel were asphyxiated. With the start of full-scale war between the Soviet Union and Nazi Germany on 22 June 1941, and with Generalissimo Chiang Kai-shek looking for increased support from the Americans through the Lend-Lease Act of which was extended to China on 6 May 1941, all new fighter aircraft produced by the Soviets were now directed to the battlefronts against Nazi Germany.

On 11 August 1941, in what would be the last-recorded dogfight between the Chinese Air Force fighters and the IJNAF Zeroes before all active Zero squadrons were pulled out of China in preparations for Operation Z (the preparation for the Pearl Harbor attack mission), future Japanese ace-fighter pilots Gitaro Miyazaki and Saburō Sakai were part of the escort of an Operation 102 bomber attack and fighter sweep of Chinese air bases between Chongqing and Chengdu, and encountered Chinese I-153 and I-16 fighters at Wenjiang Airbase; while shooting down all those that managed to take off or strafing those still taxiing down the runways, Saburo Sakai described how five Zeroes then struggled to shoot down the one last opponent still in the air that "was an absolute master" as it "snap-rolled, spiralled, looped and turned through seemingly impossible maneuvers... like a wraith", but Sakai himself only managed to finally shoot down the acrobatic biplane fighter pilot when he was forced to slow-roll in a climb while trying to clear over the top of a hill west of Chengdu. The belly of the Chinese fighter suddenly exposed right into the gunsight of Sakai's Zero, who fired cannon shells that "tore through the floorboards of the biplane", sending it down in a wide spin and exploding as it hit the hillside. Four Chinese pilots were killed in this engagement, including Lt. Huang Rongfa, whose fiancée, Ms. Yang Quanfang, took a pistol and shot herself at the memorial for him and the other martyrs on the 16th of August; under these special circumstances, the remains of Ms. Yang and Lt. Huang were buried together at the Chongqing Nanshan Air Force Martyrs Memorial Park.

On 30 August 1941, Lt. General Saburō Endō, commander of the Imperial Japanese Army's 3rd Sentai, having already received intelligence reports regarding an upcoming military conference in Chongqing held by Generalissimo Chiang Kai-shek, and the precise location for it, led a massive strike from Wuhan consisting of 205 bomber-attack planes, with Saburō Endō himself personally leading the assassination strike on Yunxiu Villa (specifically the Yunxiu Tower); at first, it made a low-level bombing run for accuracy, but was severely hampered by intense bursts of anti-aircraft fire that, according to him, "knocked me up away from my seat several times", and then having to increase altitude to 5,500 meters to make the bombing run instead, killing two guards west of Yunxiu Tower, but failing to kill the Generalissimo, who recorded in his diary how he felt the immense shocks of the bombing and suffering of the people who experienced the torment not just day and night, but for over four years.

Following the Japanese attack on Pearl Harbor in December 1941, the United States declared war on Japan, and President Roosevelt sought an immediate counterattack for the humiliation of Pearl Harbor; in the urgency to keep China resupplied for the new Sino-US joint effort in the war against Japan, General Joseph Stilwell was sent to Generalissimo Chiang Kai-shek on a top secret arrangement for the transfer of North American B-25 Mitchell bomber support equipment, radio-homing navigational aids and 100-octane avgas into China to support the planning of what was to become the Doolittle Raid against the Japanese home islands. The badly needed high-octane avgas and new equipment in China for the renewed war effort against the Empire of Japan were now increasingly being freighted via the risky Himalayan air-route known as "The Hump". As Japan's focus shifted toward the Pacific campaign, and much of the Japanese aerial-combat assets and experienced personnel had been diverted to support the war in the Pacific, the offensive campaign against Chongqing and Chengdu had been significantly curtailed; nonetheless, modern interceptor aircraft possessing far greater speed and firepower, supported by ground-based radar equipment, and new aircrew training supported by the US and Allied partners, allowed the Chinese Air Force to be in a much better position to fight back by August 1943. The last recorded air raid of the campaign took place on 19 December 1944.

== Total bomb tonnage and raids ==
Three thousand tons of bombs were dropped on the city from 1939 to 1942. According to photographer Carl Mydans, the spring 1941 bombings were at the time "the most destructive shelling ever made on a city", although terror bombing grew rapidly during the Second World War: by comparison 2,300 tons of bombs were dropped by Allied bombers on Berlin in a single night during the Battle of Berlin. A total of 268 air raids were conducted against Chongqing.

== Lawsuit against the Japanese government ==
In March 2006, 40 Chinese who were wounded or lost family members during the bombings sued the Japanese government, demanding 10,000,000 yen (628,973 yuan) each, and asked for apologies. "By filing a lawsuit, we want the Japanese people to know about Chongqing bombings," said a victim. In 2006, 188 Chongqing bombing survivors filed a group lawsuit in Japanese courts, seeking compensation and an apology. In 2015 the Tokyo High Court upheld a lower courts' ruling acknowledging damages caused, but denying the plaintiffs' right to compensation.

== Gallery ==
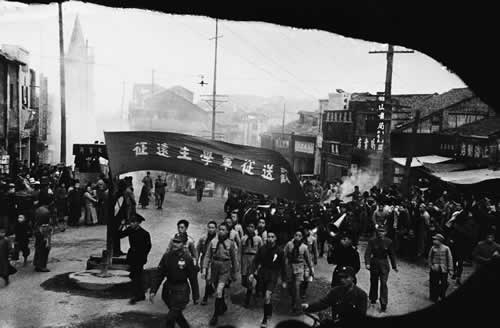
Volunteer army leaving Chongqing

The defense of Chongqing

== In popular culture ==
The story of the Chinese airmen fighting the desperate air battles over Chongqing as they were pushed-back from wartime capitals of Nanjing and Wuhan, where aerial confrontations against the Imperial Japanese invaders and that of the individual Chinese airmen, had been dramatized in the action-war film Air Strike, featuring actors Bruce Willis, Liu Ye, Song Seung-heon, and others.

A detailed dramatization of the air war in China as portrayed through perspectives of the protagonists in the Chinese Air Force, in particular that of the character portraying fighter ace Gao Youxin, families and friends of the Chinese airmen, and that of the antagonists as represented by the officers and airmen of Imperial Japanese Navy Air Force, as the air battles raged beginning with the Battles of Nanjing/Shanghai, through the Battle of Wuhan, and the last stand in the air battles over Chongqing/Chengdu, had been re-enacted in the multi-part TV series "Departed Heroes" (血战长空 - lit. Bloody Battles of the Vast Skies).
