= Aerial engagements of the Second Sino-Japanese War =

Aerial engagements
- Part of the Second Sino-Japanese War
- Flying Tigers Bite Back (1942), an American propaganda film featuring the air war
Date	July 1937 – 18 August 1945
Location	Republic of China
Result	Allied victory

Belligerents
(Republic of China (1912–1949)) Republic of China Air Force; (Soviet Union) Soviet Volunteer Group; (United States) American Volunteer Group; United States Army Air Forces	(Empire of Japan) Imperial Japanese Army Air Service; (Empire of Japan) Imperial Japanese Navy Air Service

The Second Sino-Japanese War began on 7 July 1937 with the Marco Polo Bridge incident in the Republic of China and is described by some historians as the start of World War II, as full-scale warfare erupted with the Battle of Shanghai, and ending when the Empire of Japan surrendered to the Allies in August 1945. The Chinese Air Force faced the Imperial Japanese Army and Navy Air Forces and engaged them in many aerial interceptions, including the interception of massed terror-bombing strikes on civilian targets, attacking on each other's ground forces and military assets in all manners of air interdiction and close air support; these battles in the Chinese skies were the largest air battles fought since World War I, and featured the first-ever extensive and prolonged deployment of aircraft carrier fleets launching preemptive strikes in support of expeditionary and occupation forces, and demonstrated the technological shift from the latest biplane fighter designs to the modern monoplane fighter designs on both sides of the conflict.

== Overview ==
China was not an aviation-industrial power at the time, and relied on foreign countries for its military aircraft, but did have a fledgling aircraft industry that produced a few indigenous experimental aircraft designs and foreign aircraft designs under license, including about 100 Hawk III fighter-attack planes, China's frontline fighter-attack plane of choice when war broke out in 1937, at the CAMCO plant based at the Hanzhou Jianqiao Aerodrome. 15 Chinese-American pilots along with Chinese pilots of other foreign nationalities formed the first unofficial volunteer group of pilots to join provincial/warlord air force units in the early-mid 1930s, and ultimately integrating into the front-line air units of the centralized command of the Nationalist Air Force of China by 1937, in the unified-front for imminent war against Imperial Japan. These volunteers included future ace-fighter pilots Art Chin, John "Buffalo" Huang, Wong Pan-Yang, plus Hazel Ying-Lee (who was not allowed to fly in combat as a female), Louie Yim-qun, Chan Kee-Wong et al.

As the battles of Shanghai, Nanjing, Taiyuan, and other regions dragged on near the end of 1937, the initial Chinese Air Force inventory of mostly American-made aircraft had become largely depleted, and the Soviet Union came to China's aid by supplying the bulk of aircraft to the Chinese Air Force for the next four years of war under the Sino-Soviet Treaty of 1937, and dispatching a Soviet Volunteer Group of aviators to assist with the combat operations in China; Chinese fighter pilots having mostly converted into the Polikarpov I-15 and I-16 series of fighter aircraft by early-1938. According to records from the USSR, 563 fighter planes and 322 bombers were provided to China by the Soviet Union, and these included the twin-engined Tupolev SB medium bombers and 4-engined Tupolev TB-3 heavy bombers, with the addition of Polikarpov I-153 fighters; the Chinese Air Force would remain with these increasingly obsolescent aircraft through 1941 as the Japanese made tremendous technological advancements to their combat aircraft designs and powerplant technology.

Following the Japanese invasion of French Indochina, the United States took actions to assist the Republic of China against Imperial Japan, with the oil and scrap metal embargo and freezing of Japanese assets in the summer of 1941, and along with the Lend-Lease Act of which China was included as a beneficiary on 6 May 1941, the American Volunteer Group (a.k.a. "Flying Tigers") entered the war in December 1941 with the task of protecting the main Allied supply-line into China; the cross-Himalayan air-route known as "The Hump", between the Harbor of Rangoon in Burma, British bases in India, and the Chinese wartime port-of-entry in Kunming, China, and consequently, with the attack on Pearl Harbor, the U.S. officially joined the war against Japan.

== 1937 ==
=== Battle of Shanghai/Nanjing ===
At the outbreak of full-scale conflict of the Second Sino-Japanese War/World War II in August 1937, the Chinese Air Force had 645 combat aircraft, of which about 300 were fighter planes. Japan had 1,530 army and navy aircraft, of which about 400 were deployed in China. The frontline Chinese fighter squadrons were equipped primarily with the Curtiss Hawk IIIs and Hawk IIs, followed by Boeing P-26 Model 281 Peashooter, and Fiat CR.32. Bomber-attack aircraft consisted primarily of the Curtiss A-12 Shrikes, Douglas O-2s, Heinkel He 111, Martin B-10s and Northrop Gammas. The air war in China had become a testing-zone for the latest biplane fighter designs confronting the new generation of monoplane fighter and bomber aircraft designs; the world's first aerial combat and kills between modern monoplane fighter would occur in the skies of China.

In August 1937 Claire Lee Chennault accepted the offer to assume position as an "air combat adviser" of Chiang Kai-shek, and to train new fighter pilots at the Republic of China Air Force Academy, which was forced to move from the Jianqiao to the Wujiaba Aerodrome due to the war situation.

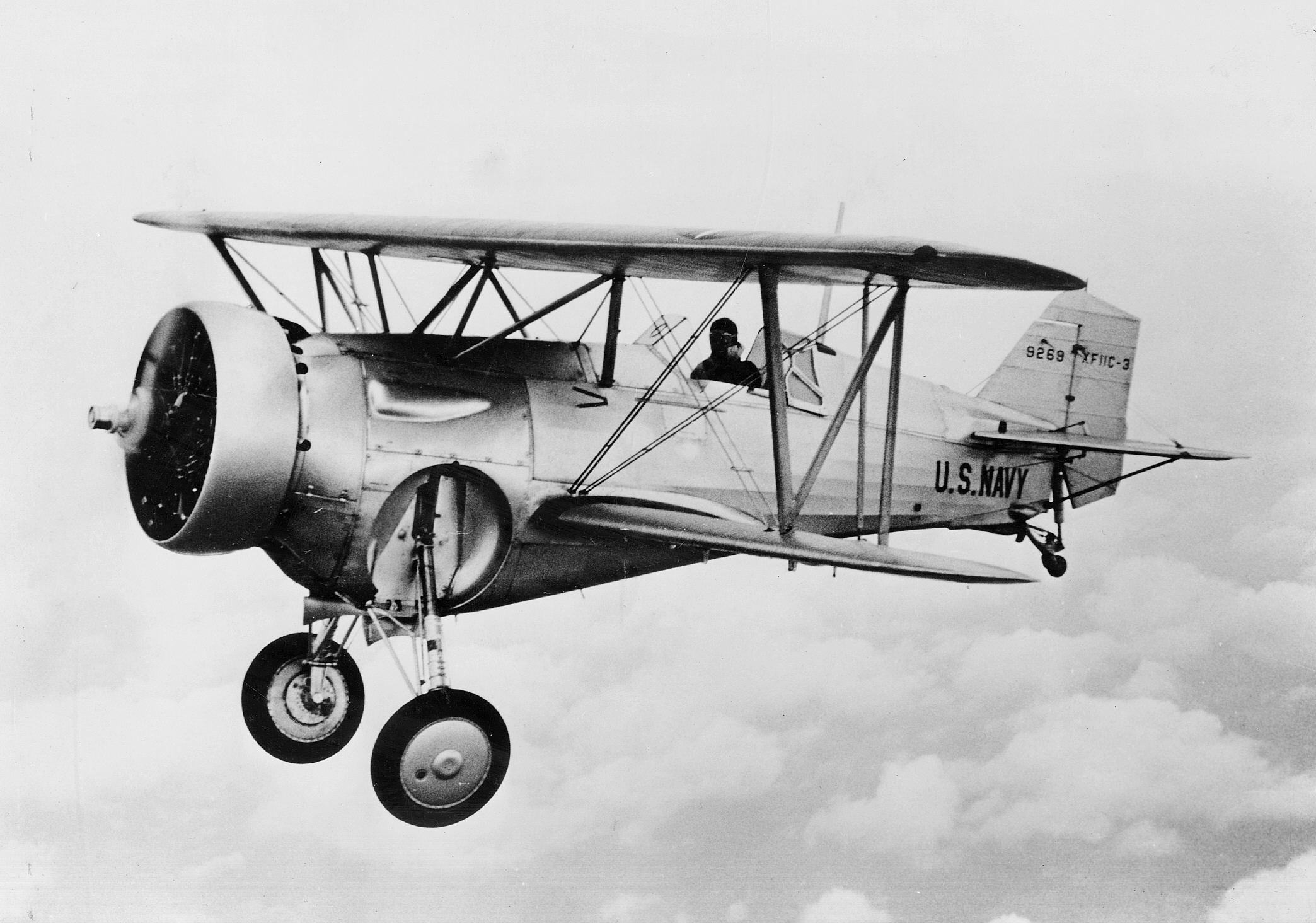
Curtiss F11C Goshawk (Hawk II) in a test flight, 1932

On 14 August 1937 the Chinese Air Force fighter squadrons sortied for the defense of Shanghai and Nanjing, capital of the Republic of China. In the afternoon of 14 August 1937, two groups of nine Japanese Mitsubishi G3M long-range bombers were launched from Japanese Taiwan on a mission to bomb Jianqiao Airfield in Hangzhou, Zhejiang, and Guangde Airfield in Anhui. The 21st and 23rd Squadrons, led by Kao Chih-hang, the Group Commander of the Chinese 4th Pursuit Group, took off from Jianqiao Airfield to intercept the Japanese bombers, despite the fact that some of the fighters had just flown in from Zhoukou and had not been refueled. Kao attacked a G3M bomber and scored a direct hit sending it plummeting to the ground in flames, and he also damaged another G3M bomber; it was the first air-to-air victory for the Chinese Air Force. Meanwhile, three other Hawk IIIs attacked a third G3M bomber and shot it down. The second group of Japanese G3M bombers attacking Guangde Airfield was intercepted by the 22nd Squadron of the 4th Pursuit Group and the 34th Squadron. Squadron Commander Cheng Hsiao-yu of the 22nd Squadron shot up the right engine and the wing fuel tank of one G3M bomber, forcing it to ditch before returning to its air base. The aerial battles in the afternoon of 14 August were a resounding victory for the Chinese Air Force, in which the Chinese Hawk III fighters destroyed four Japanese G3M long-range bombers without losing a single plane to the Japanese. In addition, two G3Ms were also shot down by ground anti-aircraft fire.

On the following day at dawn 15 August, 12 Japanese Type 89 torpedo bombers were intercepted over Hangzhou by 21 Hawk IIIs of the Chinese 4th Pursuit Group led by Group Commander Kao Chi-hang. The Chinese shot down eight bombers. In the afternoon 20 Japanese G3M bombers on a raid to Nanjing were intercepted by 26 Chinese fighters from the 8th, 17th, 28th and 34th Squadrons flying eight Boeing 281 P-26 Peashooters, five Gloster Gladiators, 13 Hawk IIIs and Hawk IIs. The Chinese shot down four and damaged six Japanese G3M bombers.

On 16 August, the Japanese launched two raids with a total of 11 Japanese G3M bombers on the airfield near Nanjing; they were intercepted by five Chinese fighters from the 17th and 28th Squadrons. The Chinese shot down three Japanese bombers, and lost three fighters. On 17 August Chinese Hawk III fighters flew 17 sorties shooting down one Japanese bomber; the Chinese lost two aircraft. From 20 August to the end of the month, daily aerial engagements took place between the Chinese and Japanese planes, and the Japanese facing unexpected tenacity from the Chinese pilots, suffered prohibitive losses made worse by the sacrifice of armored protection in exchange for supposed-advantage of lighter-weight and higher-performance of the newer Japanese aircraft designs. In that period the Chinese shot down 24 Japanese planes and lost 11 aircraft.

In order to compete against the highly advanced Mitsubishi A5M fighters of the IJNAF, Colonel Kao Chih-hang ordered maintenance crews to remove the bomb-racks, fuel tank cowlings, and landing lights to save weight and reduce drag off the Hawks. On 12 October 1937, Kao led an aggressive seek-and-destroy mission consisting of six Hawk IIIs, two Boeing P-26/281 "Peashooters", and a Fiat CR.32 to engage approaching Japanese fighter aircraft. A group of Mitsubishi A5Ms soon appeared on approach to Nanking and Col. Kao led his group into a melee, where Maj. John Wong Pan-Yang, a Chinese-American volunteer pilot from Seattle flying one of two P-26 "Peashooters", drew first blood shooting down the A5M piloted by PO1c Mazazumi Ino. Captain Liu Cuigang shot down another A5M that was sent crashing down into a "Mr. Yang's residence in southern Nanking", and Colonel Gao scored a double-kill against the A5Ms, including that of shotai leader WO Torakuma. The outnumbered Chinese pilots were able to defeat the Japanese fighter group flying the technologically superior Mitsubishi A5M "Claudes".

=== Battle of Taiyuan ===
As the frontline battlefields raged at the Battle of Shanghai and Battle of Nanking, pressing demands for aerial support at the Battle of Taiyuan in the northern front and Canton in the southern front, forced the Chinese Air Force to split the 28th PS, 5th PG based at Jurong Airbase in the Nanking defense sector into two smaller squadrons, and then dispatching half of the squadron to the south in Guangdong under the command of Lt. Arthur Chin, and the other half to the north at Taiyuan under the command of Capt. Chan Kee-Wong.

=== Battle of Nanchang ===
The Japanese launched pre-emptive airstrikes against Chinese Air Force assets at the Laoyingfang and Qingyunpu Airbases beginning in 1937; these were engaged by new Chinese Polikarpov fighters obtained under the Sino-Soviet Non-Aggression Pact of 1937.

=== Summary of 1937 ===
In the first four months of the war from July to November 1937, the Chinese Air Force flew 137 sorties, attacking Japanese army positions, and engaged in 57 air battles with Japanese airplanes; the Chinese Air Force shot down 94 Japanese planes and damaged 52 on the ground, but lost 131 aircraft. The Chinese Air Force pilots fought well despite their airfields being under constant Japanese air attacks. To commemorate the heroic acts and sacrifices of the Chinese pilots in defense of their homeland, the Republic of China declared 14 August the Chinese Air Force Day known as the "814 Day", the day on which the Chinese Air Force scored its first air-to-air victory. In this initial phase of the war, the outnumbered Chinese had no replacements for their lost planes and many experienced pilots killed in action, while the Western powers turned its back to the war situation, the Chinese began turning to the Soviet Union for new aircraft and various other combat equipment and war materials, while the Japanese were able to replace their lost planes with even more advanced aircraft, and continued to train new pilots.

== 1938 ==
=== Battle of Taierzhuang ===
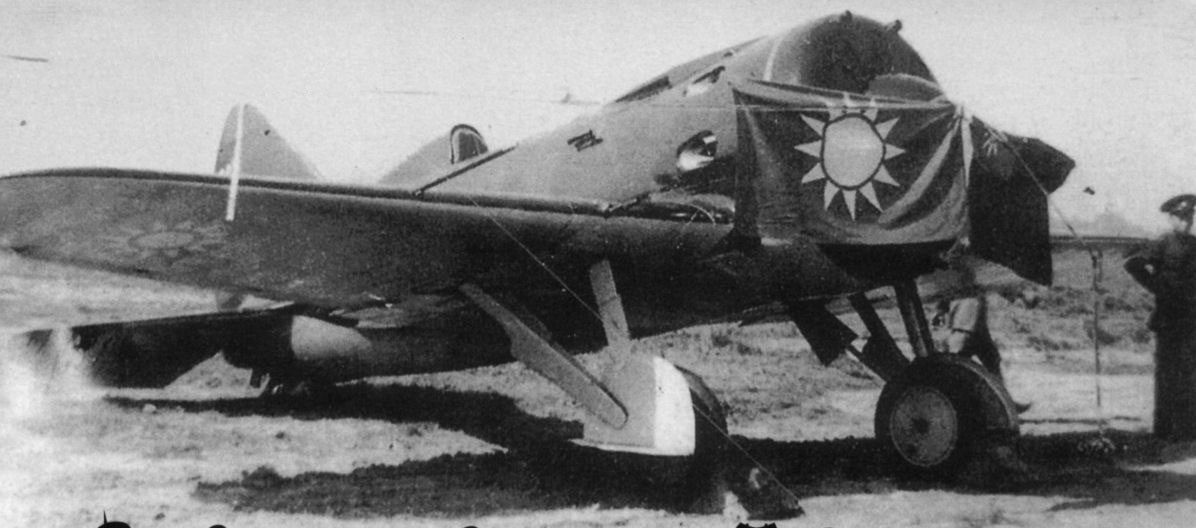
Soviet I-16 fighter plane with Chinese insignia, used by the Chinese Air Force and Soviet volunteers

=== Chinese B-10 bombers over Nagasaki ===
The Chinese Air Force deployed two Martin B-10 (a.k.a. Martin Model 139) bombers led by pilots Capt. Hsu Huan-sheng and 1Lt. Teng Yan-po on 19 May 1938 in an infiltration mission over into Japan for the "leaflet bombing" of Nagasaki, Fukuoka, Saga, and other cities in the effort to solicit Japanese citizen's moral anti-war solidarity against Imperial Japan's violent aggressions and war crimes in China.

== 1939 ==
From mid-1938 to mid-1939, Japanese forces intensified their attacks on the front near Lanzhou. The Japanese air units were operating from airfields in Shanxi at the margin of the operating range of their fighters, and their bombers were often not escorted by fighter planes. On 20 February 1939, thirty Japanese bombers flying in 3 formations were intercepted over Lanzhou by 40 USSR volunteer and Chinese fighters taking off in small groups at 5-minute intervals. In the ensuing battle, nine Japanese bombers were shot down, killing 63 crew members, and one USSR pilot was wounded. Three days later on 23 February, the USSR fighters intercepted 57 Japanese bombers on bombing raids to the city and airfield of Lanzhou; the USSR fighters shot down six Japanese bombers and forced the Japanese to abandon the airfield target. In the battles of February, the Chinese pilots of the 17th Squadron fought alongside the USSR volunteers.

=== Battle of Chongqing-Chengdu ===
The massive IJAAF and IJNAF joint-strike terror-bombing campaigns and all-airwar which began in earnest on 3 May 1939 under the codename Operation 100 (100 号作战) as the Chinese Air Force was reorganizing from the Battle of Wuhan.

In March 1939, the Chinese 4th Air Group, comprising 21st, 22nd, 23rd and 24th squadrons, was transferred to the airbase at Guangyangba for the defense of Chongqing. On 3 May, the 4th Air Group led by Group Commander Dong Mingde intercepted 54 Japanese bombers on their bombing raid to Chongqing, and shot down 7 Japanese bombers; deputy squadron commander Zhang Mingsheng (plane R-7153) was shot down and later died of his wounds. On 11 July, Chongqing was bombed by 27 Japanese bombers, which were met by eight I-15s led by Squadron Commander Zheng Shaoyu; Zheng's I-15 (No. 2310) had 38 bullets holes and I-15 (No. 2307) flown by pilot Liang Tianchen was shot down in flames.

=== Battle of South Guangxi ===
The battle over Nanning City, China last wartime access to seaport, including the Battle of Kunlun Pass. The final combat missions for Chinese-American volunteer pilot and fighter-ace Arthur Chin. In December 1939, the USSR fighter group, up to 50 planes under the command of S. P. Suprun was transferred to south Yunnan where Japanese air attacks on communications lines along the Chinese portion of the Burma Road had become more intense. Suprun's group participated in the Battle of South Guangxi, flying missions together with Chinese I-15 fighters from the 4th Air Group, the 27th and 29th Squadrons (Arthur Chin) from the 3rd Air Group, part of the 18th Squadron with Curtiss Hawk 75, and even the 32nd Squadron equipped with the ancient Douglas O-2MC scout/light bombers, led by former Guangxi warlord air force commander Wei Yiqing.

The USSR volunteer squadrons often flew their missions together with Chinese squadrons. From the beginning of 1938 to May 1940, USSR squadrons participated in more than 50 major air battles and together with Chinese squadrons shot down 81 Japanese aircraft, damaged 114 and 14 Japanese warships. In the summer of 1940, the USSR withdrew their volunteer pilots, leaving only a small number of advisers and technical personnel in China. They continued to supply aircraft to China until June 1941 when Germany invaded the Soviet Union.

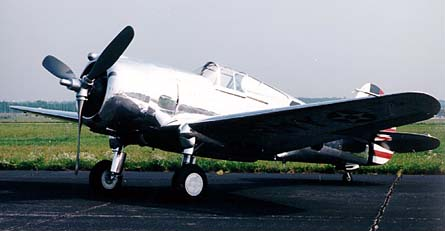
Curtiss Hawk 75, a U.S.-built fighter aircraft of the 1930s

Curtiss Hawk 75, a new version of the Curtiss P-36 Hawk flown by Chinese pilots also took an active part in combat but did not achieve any special success. The Chinese 25th Squadron was the first unit to receive the new Hawk 75 and began to train in July 1938 under the direction of Claire Lee Chennault. On 18 August 1938, Squadron Commander Tang Pu-sheng led three Hawk 75s and 7 Polikarpov I-15s to intercept 27 Japanese planes over Hengyang; the Hawk 75s shot down one enemy plane and damaged another. Tang was shot down and killed; the other two Hawk 75s crashed during landing. The 16th Squadron of the 6th Bomber Air Group, having earlier flown the V-92 Corsair light bombers, was changed to a fighter squadron on 1 October 1938 and was sent to Zhiqiang, Hunan, to take possession of nine Hawk 75s. The pilots retrained under the direction of Chennault. At the end of the year, they were redeployed to Yibin, Sichuan, for air defense of the Chinese wartime capital of Chongqing. In January 1939, the squadron flew to Kunming, Yunnan, where it was disbanded in August the same year. Prior to 1 November 1938, the 18th Squadron was also included in the 6th Bomber Air Group, flying the Douglas O-2MC scout/light bombers; it was re-equipped with nine Hawk 75 fighters, and independently began retraining with its Squadron Commander Yang Yibai in Yibin.

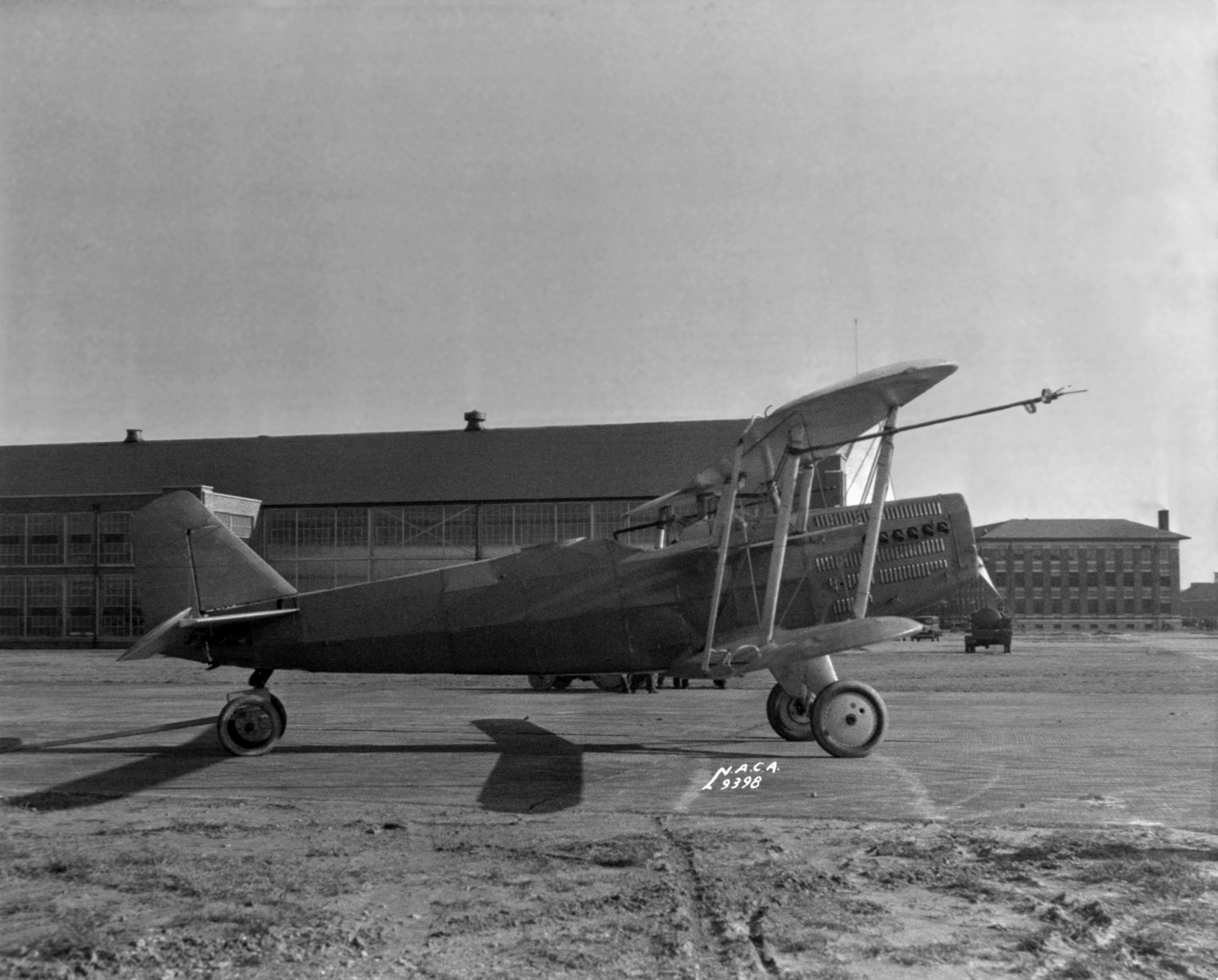
Douglas O-2, a 1920s American observation and light bomber aircraft

In January 1939 the 18th Squadron relocated to Kunming to defend the city from air attacks. On 1 August the squadron was rebased to Chongqing, and in December took part in the Battle of South Guangxi. At the beginning of 1940 it moved to Yunnan for defense of the Kunming-Mengzi railroad, which was subjected to massive air attacks. At the end of May the squadron returned to Chongqing; it did not have enough serviceable Hawk 75s, and was supplemented with nine old Hawk III biplanes from the 22nd Squadron.

== 1940 ==
On 8 February 1940, 27 Japanese planes heading for Mengzi were intercepted at 3.05 pm by three Hawk 75s of the 18th Squadron taking off from Kunming. In the ensuing dogfight, one Hawk 75 (No. 5024) was damaged and forced to crash land; its pilot Yang Tzu-fan was injured. On 13 February 1940 three Hawk 75s of the 18th Squadron intercepted 27 Japanese bombers which were on their way to bomb the bridge near Siulungtam. The Hawk 75s hit one Japanese bomber and were later joined by three I-15 biplane fighters. Together they made many passes at the damaged bomber, killing the upper gunner. The Chinese claimed to have finally shot down the hapless plane. Several of the Chinese planes were slightly damaged and one pilot, Tseng Pei-fu, was injured.

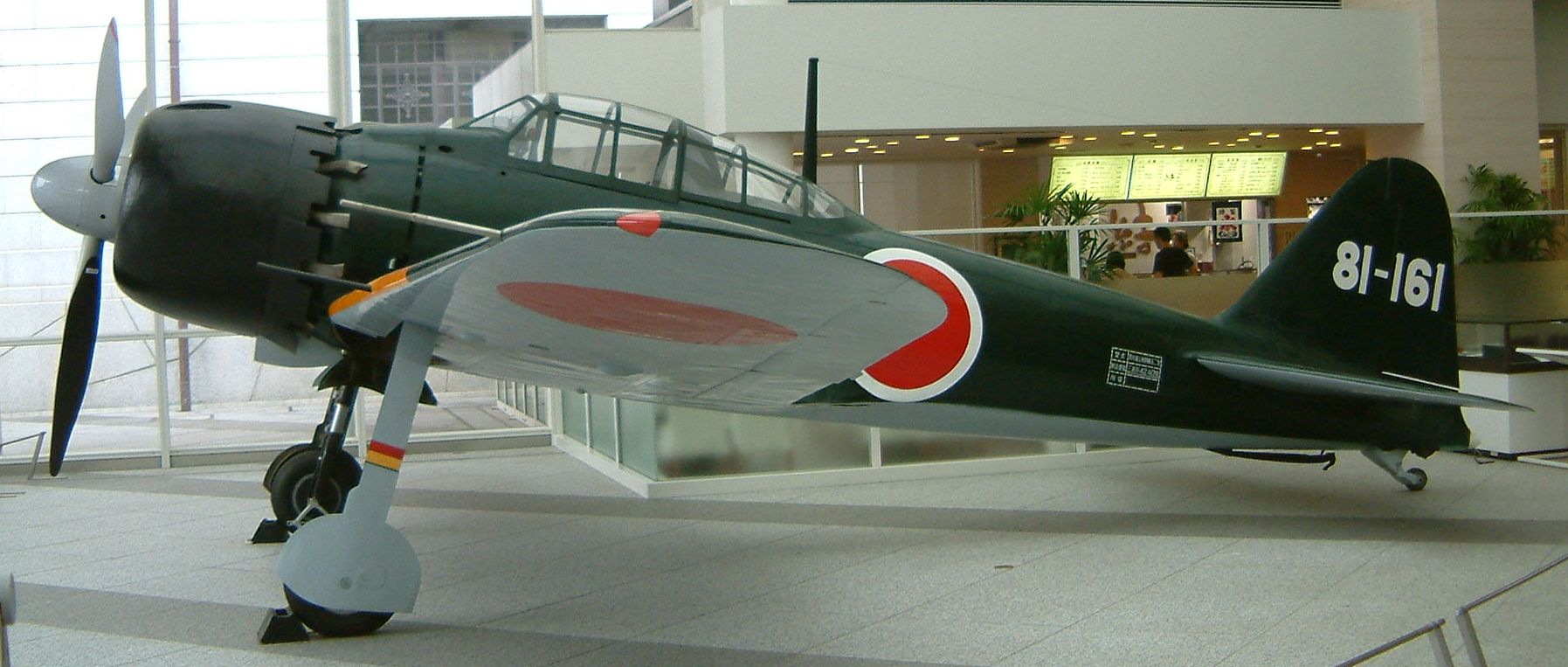
Japanese A6M5 Type 0 Model 52

While the Mitsubishi A5M was the most-advanced fighter in the Chinese theatre since September 1937, the Japanese were soon to introduce the world's most advanced fighter aircraft into China in the summer of 1940; the Mitsubishi A6M "Zero". The new Zero was far superior to the A5M predecessor, the Soviet I-16 and American Hawk 75 fighter planes. The Chinese Air Force issued a general directive to its air units to adopt an "air dispersal tactics", and to avoid direct confrontation with Japanese fighters whenever possible.

On 4 October 1940 six Hawk 75s of the 18th Squadron were following the order to disperse to Guanxian when 27 Japanese Mitsubishi G3M bombers escorted by eight Japanese A6M Zeros led by Lieutenant Tamotsu Yokoyama on a bombing raid to Chengdu. The Japanese Zeros caught up with the Hawk 75s and shot one down, wounding the pilots of another two and forcing them to crash land, and set two Hawk 75s on fire on the ground while refueling. By December 1940 the 18th Squadron had ceased to exist in reality, and was disbanded in January 1941. The Hawk 75 fighters in the Chinese Air Force were later replaced by the American Curtiss P-40.

=== The Manchukuo Imperial Army Air Arm ===
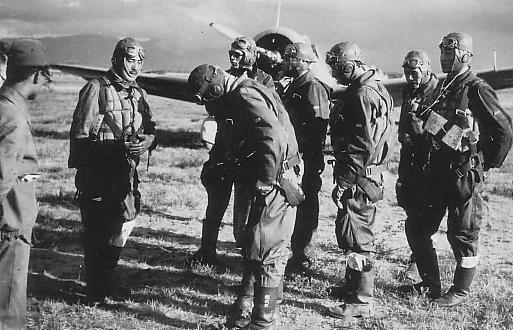
Manchukuo Imperial Army Air Arm

The Manchukuo Imperial Army Air Arm was established for the puppet government of Manchukuo's army under the auspices of the Empire of Japan in the summer of 1940, and with it the Central Air Force Flight Academy that trained aviators for both civil and military. Equipped primarily with Nakajima Ki-27 fighters, the Manchukuo Imperial Army Air Arm were primary based in Fengtian (Shengyang) and Harbin. Towards the end of World War II, the Manchukuo Orchid Special Attack Force (kamikaze attack squadron) was established to counter the USAAF B-29 bomber raids on Manchukuo/NE territories.

== 1941 ==
After withdrawing its volunteer pilots from China in the summer of 1940, the Soviet Union continued to supply aircraft to China until June 1941. Fighting continued on the northern front near Lanzhou, which was the Chinese terminus of the Chinese-Soviet transportation route. Chinese pilots were left to defend the northern front against Japanese air attacks.

On 21 May 1941 eight I-15s of the 21st Squadron and one I-15 from the 29th Squadron flying in 2 formations on patrol encountered 27 Japanese bombers over Lanzhou. The first group of I-15s led by Squadron Commander Chen Sheng-hsing shot down one of the Japanese Mitsubishi G3M long range bombers and damaged another. On 22 May, 25 Japanese G3M bombers from the unit of Mihoro Kōkūtai were on a morning raid on Lanzhou. Seven Chinese I-16s of the 24th Pursuit Squadron and one Tupolev SB bomber of the 9th Bomb Squadron were ordered to disperse. Due to bad weather, the I-16s landed at Chung Chuan Chun Airfield just north of Lanzhou. As the Japanese bombers were sighted overhead, one of the I-16s flown by Kao You-hsing having just landed with the engine still running, took off to attack the Japanese planes, and shot down a G3M bomber flown by Lieutenant Shin-Taro Hashimoto and damaged another. The remaining six I-16s were able to take off and dispersed. On 26 May, Japanese fighters encountered 18 I-15s from the 29th Pursuit Squadron flying from Gansucheng to Lanzhou; two I-16s were shot down, both pilots bailing out, and the other 16 I-16s were destroyed on the ground when they landed for refuelling.

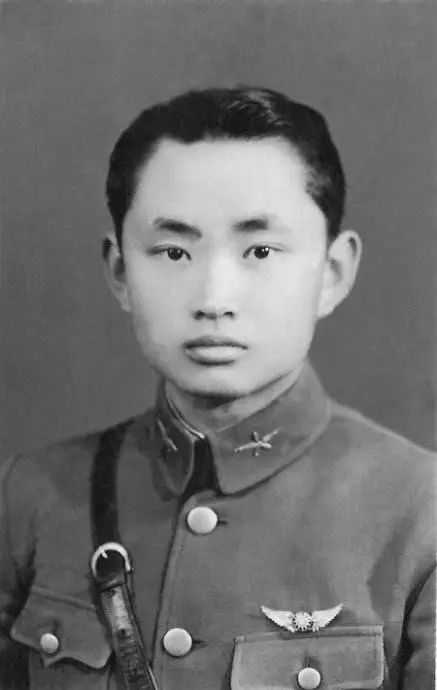
Lin Heng (a brother of Lin Huiyin) was KIA along with ace pilots Capt Shen Tse-Liu and Maj Wong Sun-Shui in an air battle over Shuangliu Airbase in Chengdu, March 1941.

Since World War II erupted in Europe on 1 September 1939 after Nazi Germany invaded Poland, the United States had maintained its neutrality until the unannounced Japanese air attack on the American naval base at Pearl Harbor on 7 December 1941. In October 1940, China appealed to American president Franklin D. Roosevelt to allow the sale of military aircraft to China along with the recruitment of American pilots for the resistance war against the Japanese invasion. In December, Washington approved China's request to recruit American pilots who would resign from U.S. military services and volunteer to serve in the Chinese Air Force with significant monetary compensation. On 11 March 1941, the U.S. passed the Lend-Lease Act, which permitted the U.S. government to provide war equipment and material to Britain, France and other allied countries. On 6 May 1941, this policy was extended to China as well. With the full-scale war between the Soviets and Nazi Germany, all new fighter aircraft produced by the Soviets were now directed to the battlefronts against Nazi Germany. While the decision was made by the Americans to support Generalissimo Chiang Kai-shek in the War of Resistance against the Japanese with the Lend-Lease Act, much needed help also came by way of the American response to the Japanese invasion of French Indochina, which motivated the Americans to enact the U.S. scrap metal and oil embargo against Japan and the freezing of Japanese assets in summer of 1941.

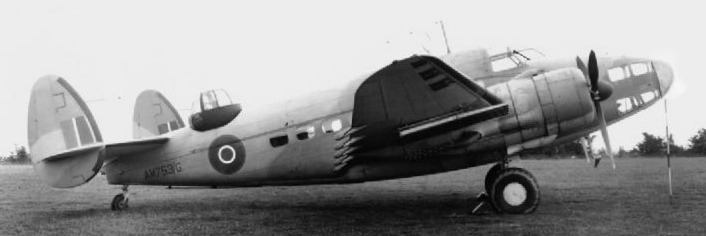
Lockheed Hudson Mk V

In August 1941, American Lockheed Hudson A-29 bombers arrived in China (22 planes turned over to Chinese Air Force). The Chinese 9th and 30th Bomber Squadrons were re-equipped with the Hudson A-29. In October 1941 the 9th Bomber Squadron was combat ready and flew bombing missions on Yuncheng, Shanxi, Hankou and other Japanese-occupied cities in China.

The American Volunteer Group, better known as the Flying Tigers, was officially formed on 1 July 1941, consisting of three squadrons of 30 planes each under the direct control and command of Claire Lee Chennault. In August, through the efforts of Chennault, 100 American volunteer pilots and about 200 mechanics and ground personnel were recruited. Curtiss-Wright Company also agreed to provide China 100 Curtiss Tomahawk P-40Bs, which had previously been rejected by Britain and later allocated to Sweden.

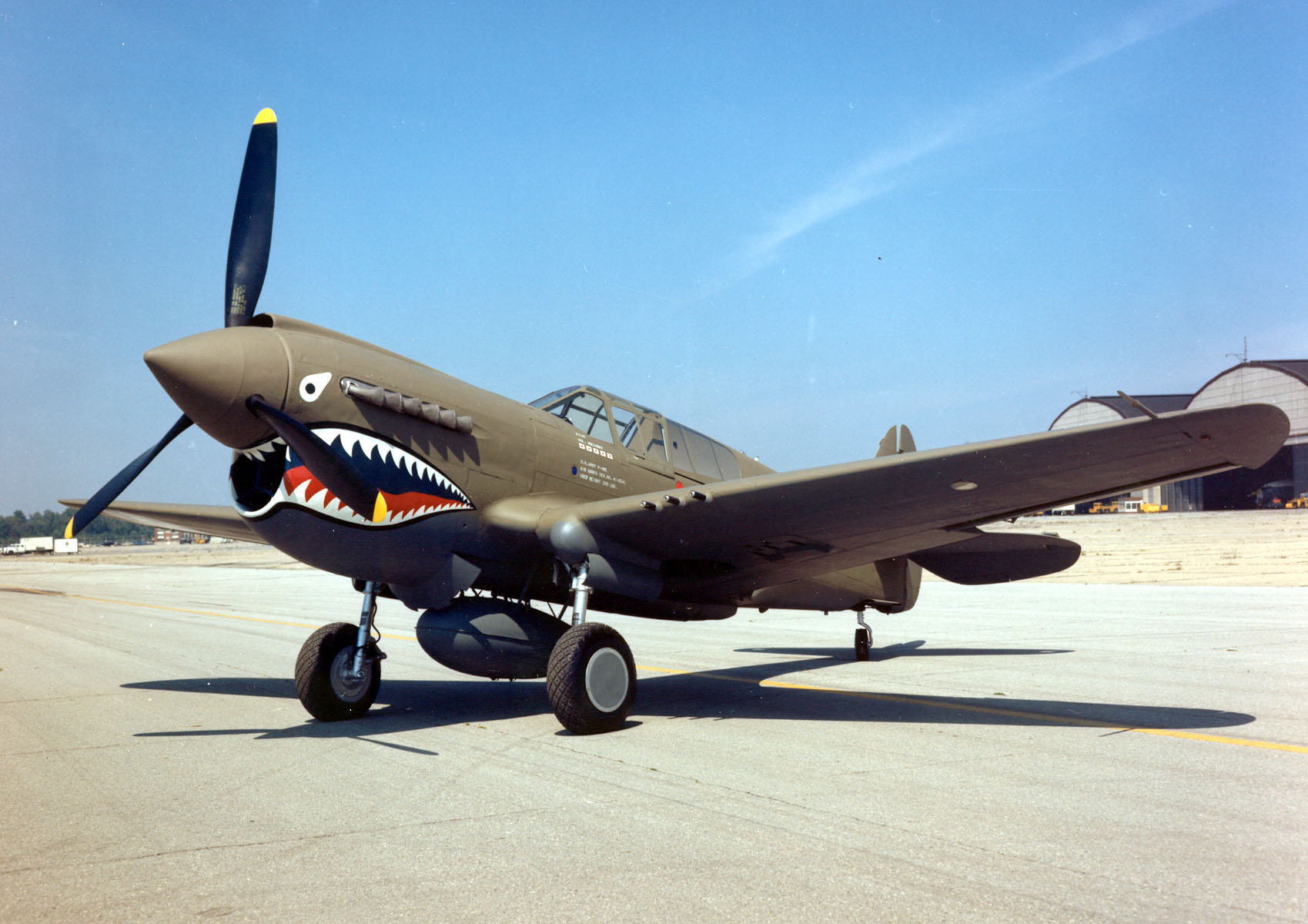
Curtiss P-40E at the National Museum of the United States Air Force

The Flying Tigers began to train in September 1941 in Taungoo, Burma, and with the help of the high speed and relatively heavy armament (Two .50-caliber cowl-mounted and four .30-caliber wing guns) of the heavily armored P-40 Warhawks and dissimilar air combat tactics against the dangerously nimble, though lightly armored Japanese fighters, the Flying Tigers saw immediate success. On 12 December 1941 the 3rd Squadron stationed in Rangoon joined the British Royal Air Force in defense of Rangoon. The 1st and 2nd Squadrons were sent to Kunming on 18 December, guarding Kunming and the Chinese section of the Burma Road against Japanese air attacks. On 20 December, the Flying Tigers saw their first action in the skies of Kunming when the 1st and 2nd Squadrons intercepted a formation of Japanese planes on a bombing raid; the Flying Tigers shot down nine of ten Japanese bombers and lost one P-40. Three days later, the Flying Tigers' 3rd Squadron inflicted comparable damage on a formation of Japanese planes on a bombing raid to Rangoon. For the next six months, the aerial battles of the Flying Tigers' P-40s with Japanese fighter and bomber aircraft were regular sights in the skies over south Yunnan and Burma.

When Rangoon fell to Japanese forces in early March 1942, Chennault withdrew all Flying Tigers squadrons to the Wujiaba airbase in Kunming. The Japanese fighter aircraft were more maneuverable as compared to the Flying Tigers's P-40. However, the Flying Tigers' pilots were able to take advantage of the fast diving speed and heavy firepower of their P-40s in "boom and zoom" (hit and run) tactics to gain an advantage over the agile but armorless Japanese fighters. The American Volunteer Group was officially disbanded on 4 July 1942 when its one-year contract expired. The Group celebrated its final day by shooting down five Japanese fighters over Hengyang and escorting B-25 bombers of the United States Army Air Forces to bomb the Japanese air base at Guangzhou. In the short period of some six months from 20 December 1941 to the beginning of July 1942, the Flying Tigers had flown on more than 50 combat missions, destroying 299 Japanese planes including bombers, Nakajima Ki-43 fighters, and 153 probables; the Flying Tigers lost 12 planes in air battles and 61 on the ground; 13 pilots were killed and three were captured as prisoners of war. Those were incredible records in aerial combat. However, the Japanese immediate voiced their discontent with the American tactics through their English-language propaganda broadcasts by Tokyo Rose, who called the Americans "cowards", and continuously challenged the American pilots to "stop running away" (to the general amusement of the American pilots who tuned in to her broadcasts).

== 1942 ==
After the attack on Pearl Harbor, with the top-units of the Japanese Army and Navy air forces dispatched to the Pacific War theater, the Chinese Air Force was in preparation for transition from the older Soviet-made combat aircraft to newer American-made aircraft, however, the CAF continued combat operations with Soviet-made aircraft in this interim period, including a major offensive-strike operation on 22 January 1942, in which CAF Tupolev SB-2 bombers from Taipingsi air base in Sichuan, rendezvoused with AVG fighter escorts (a total of over four dozen aircraft), and flying to Gia Lam Airport in Vietnam to bomb the occupying Japanese forces based there; Major Shao Ruilin who commanded from an SB-2 was shot down by anti-aircraft fire and was killed over Hanoi.

By the time the American Volunteer Group was officially disbanded on 4 July 1942, the United States had been a combatant in World War II for nearly seven months. Chennault was recalled to active duty in the United States Army Air Forces (USAAF); he was promoted to brigadier general to take command of the China Air Task Force (CATF), which was established on 14 July 1942 as a part of the 10th Air Force of USAAF. The 10th Air Force was activated on 12 February 1942 for operations in the China-Burma-India theatre of the war. Later in June 1942, Chennault was given the command of the 10th Air Force after the transfer of Commanding General Lewis Brereton to Egypt on 6 June 1942. The CATF included the four squadrons of P-40s of the 23rd Fighter Group and the 11th Bomber Group of B-25 Mitchells. Many of the fighter pilots in the CATF were former pilots of the Flying Tigers.

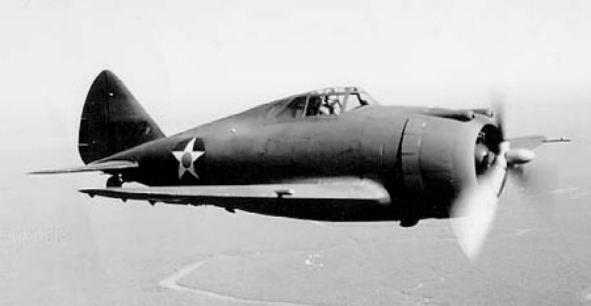
USAAF Republic P-43 Lancer

One of the aircraft contracts to be funded by the American Lend-Lease was to supply China with 125 P-43 Lancer fighter planes. In early 1942, shipments began of the P-43s in crates to China via Karachi, India, and they included some Vultee P-66 Vanguard fighters. The 4th Air Group of the Chinese Air Force was selected to receive and ferry the P-43s from India to Kunming. Many were lost in test flights and ferrying accidents. By August 1941, according to Chinese sources, the Chinese Air Forces received 41 operable P-43s. The 4th Air Group was sent to Chengdu to train on the new P-43s, and joined in the defense of Chengdu with the I-15s of the 17th Squadron and I-16s of the 29th Squadron. During the first half of 1942, there were few combat operations by pilots of the Chinese Air Force.

As of 13 August 1942, Chennault's CATF had also received five P-43s with five more promised. At this time, the CAFT consisted of 56 operational fighters, including P-40Bs, P-40Es and a few P-43s in four squadrons (the 16th, 74th, 75th and 76th) and eight B-25Cs of the 11th Bomb Squadron at Kunming, Guilin, Hengyang and Yunnan.

On 3 September, a P-43 flown by Lieutenant Martin Cluck of the 75th Squadron had to abort a reconnaissance mission due to mechanical trouble, Japanese fighters attacked him at low altitude near the air base and riddled his P-43. Cluck landed safely and escaped from his aircraft, but the P-43 was destroyed by Japanese strafing. One P-40 was also destroyed on the ground.

On 27 October 1942, 12 P-43s of the Chinese Air Force flying from Taipingsi, Sichuan, escorted nine A-29 Hudsons in a raid on Yungcheng, Shanxi. They destroyed one Japanese aircraft on the ground without suffering losses. In November, a mission of A-29 Hudsons was flown with escorts of P-66 Vanguards. In November, another bombing mission were flown escorted by P-43s. On 27 November, a bombing mission of A-29s was joined by Soviet SB bombers; in this mission one A-29 and three SB bombers were lost due to bad weather. On 30 December, three P-43s and six P-40s from the CATF flew an escort mission to Lashio, Burma; the P-43s provided top cover to the P-40s, enabling the P-40s to claim one of the six Japanese fighters encountered.

== 1943 ==
On 10 March 1943, Claire Lee Chennault was promoted to Major General, taking command also of the 14th Air Force, that was newly formed on 5 March 1943. On 19 March 1943, the CATF was incorporated into the United States Army as the 14th Air Force. The 10th and 14th Air Forces became the major American combat forces in the China-Burma-India theatre. The 14th Air Force took on the name of Flying Tigers. In the eight-month operations of the CATF from July 1942 to March 1943, they shot down 145 Japanese planes and 85 probables, and flew 65 bombing missions; they lost 16 P-40s and one B-25 Mitchell bomber.

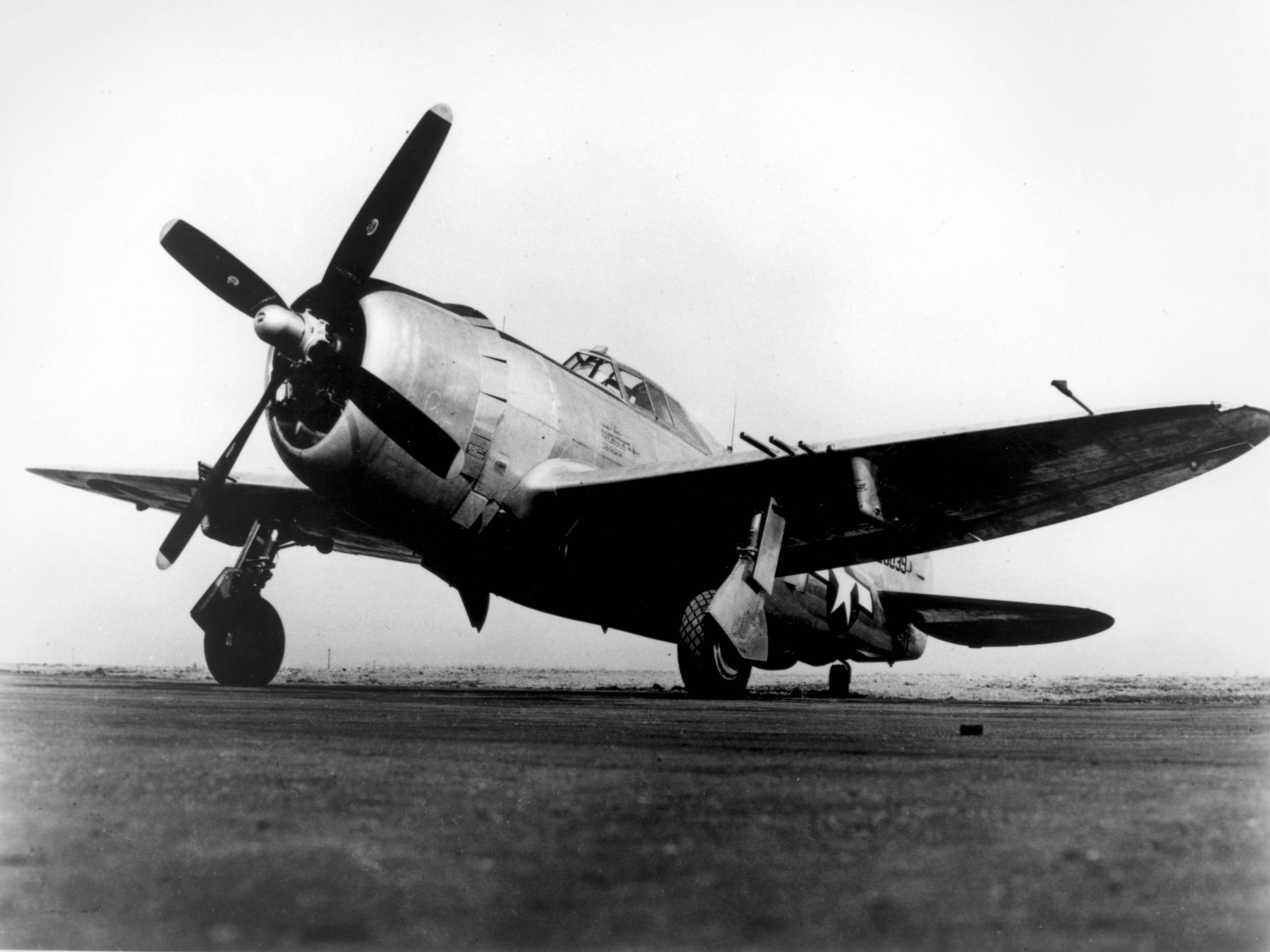
USAAF P-47D "Razorback" a vast improvement over the Curtiss P-40 Warhawk, its predecessor

In May 1943, the Japanese launched a ground offensive advancing into the area of Dongting Lake in northeastern Hunan and the region of the Yangtze River feeding to the lake. The objectives of the offensive were to secure the communication line and capture the fertile Chinese "Rice Bowl" region. To counter the Japanese offensive, both the 14th Air Force and the Chinese Air Force's 4th Air Group flying P-40s and P-43s provided air support to the Chinese ground troops. The 4th Group went into action on 19 May with 8 P-40Es and 4 P-43s escorting A-29 Hudson bombers over the enemy positions. On this mission, the Deputy Group Commander Xu Baoyun, flying a P-40E, was shot down by anti-aircraft gunfire. On 31 May Lieutenant-Colonel John R. Alison, an American ace and two USAAF wingmen led seven P-40s from the 4th Air Group escorting nine B-24 bombers to Yichang; Alison's P-40 was badly shot up by Captain Ohtsubo Yasuto, leader of the 1st Chutai (squadron) of the 33rd FR. Lieutenant Tsang Hsi-Lan, nicknamed "Bulldog" (plane No. 2304) of the 4th Group shot down Ohtsubo, saving Alison's life. Tsang was awarded the American Silver Star as well as China's highest decoration.

On 6 June, eight Japanese light bombers escorted by 14 fighters were on a raid on Liangshan. 13 P-40s from the Chinese Air Force led by Colonel Li Hsiang-yang were returning to Liangshan from a mission. Having just landed, Captain Chow Chin-kai, commander of the 23rd Squadron and veteran of many years combat ran from his P-40 to a P-66 parked nearby, and took off to attack the Japanese formation. While the Japanese fighters were strafing the airfield, Chow attacked the bombers and destroyed three. Despite Chow's heroic act, 12 P-40s and one fleet trainer were destroyed on the ground. Chow received the Blue-Sky-White-Sun (Chinese Nationalist emblem) award personally from Chiang Kai-shek.

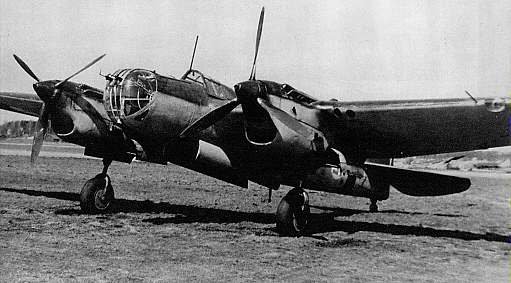
A Soviet Tupolev SB-2 bomber of the Finnish Air Force

By June 1943, the ground operations on the front of the "Rice Bowl" campaign were stabilized. In that campaign from 19 May to 6 June 1943, the Chinese Air Force flew on 336 fighter sorties and 88 bombing missions. The "Rice Bowl" campaign took its toll on the Chinese Air Force, which suffered heavy losses in combat and on the ground. At the end of the campaign the Chinese Air Force units numbered no more than a total of 77 combat aircraft, including seven A-29s, ten SBs, five P-40Es, nine P-43s and 46 P-66s, and of the total only 59 were serviceable. In May, the 14th Air Force received about 50 new P-40K, P-40M and P-40A fighters, and high-altitude Lockheed P-38 Lightning fighters in July, phasing out the old P-40s.

From July to September 1943, Japanese air units carried out concentrated attacks in three consecutive phases each targeting on a different area. The first phase from 22 July to 22 August concentrated on American air bases centered on Guilin, resulting in 50 American planes destroyed by the Japanese. The second phase began on 23 August, in which they targeted their attacks on Chongqing, Chengdu and eastern China air bases. At dawn on 23 August, 21 bombers escorted by 17 fighters took off from Hankou and were joined en route by another 14 fighters to strike an arsenal just to the west of Chongqing. A total of 29 fighters including ten P-40s, eight P-43s and 11 P-66s of the Chinese Air Force from the 4th and 11th Group at Peishiyi Airfield scrambled and took to the air to intercept. A flight of American fighters also scrambled from a distant air base but was too far to intercept. In the ensuing battle, the Japanese shot down two P-66s, one each of the P-40s and P-43s, and lost one bomber. The Chinese reported to have shot down three Japanese fighters and five bomber probables. In the third phase beginning in September, the Japanese resumed their attacks on targets in Guilin and Yunnan.

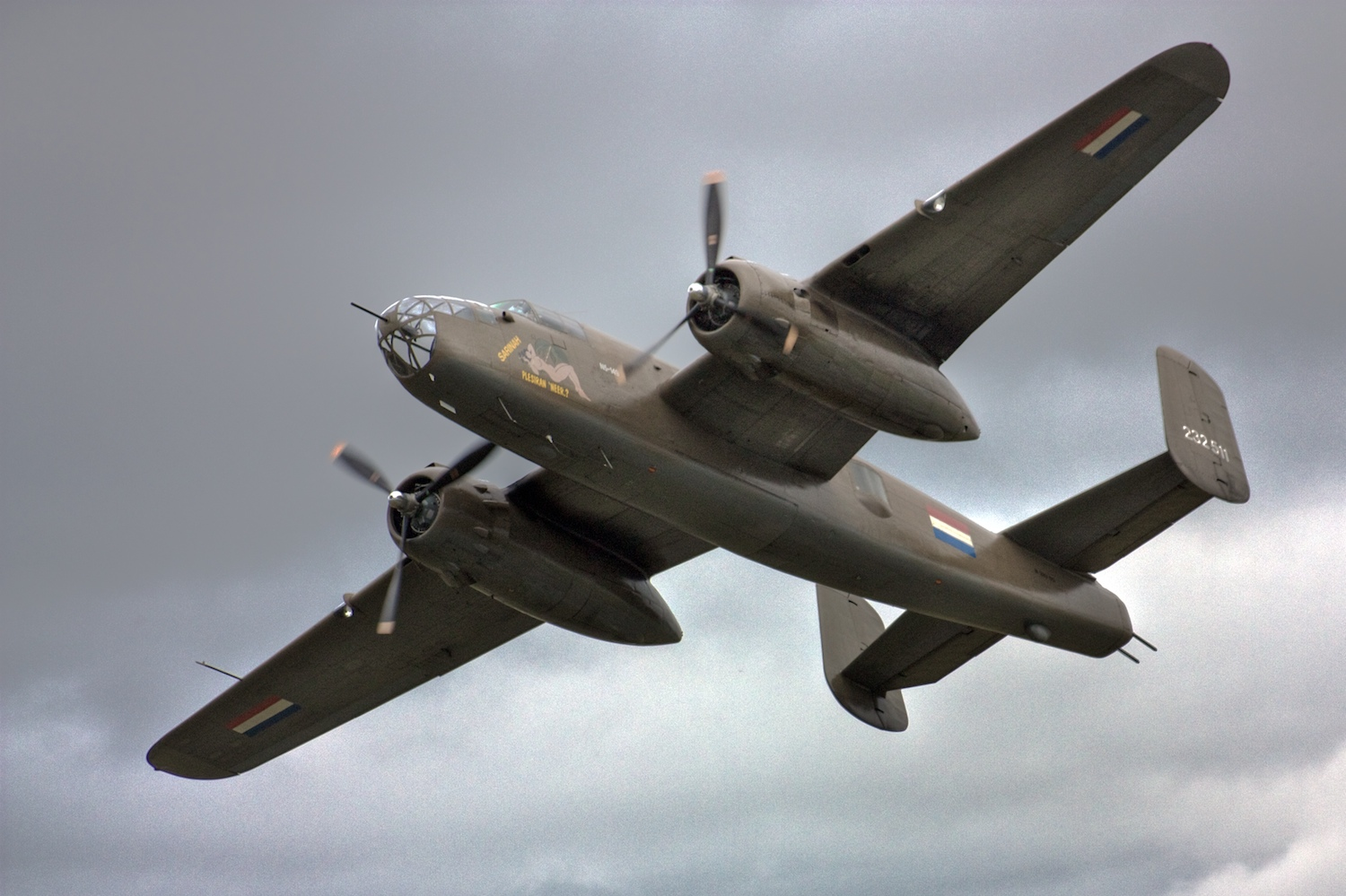
North American B-25 Mitchell Medium bomber

As a part of the 14th Air Force, Chennault created a special unit known as the Chinese-American Composite Wing (Provisional) (CACW) under his command. The CACW comprised the 1st Bomber Group, and the 3rd and 5th Fighter Groups with American pilots, and Chinese pilots from the Chinese Air Force, as well as American and Chinese ground crews. Since many of the Chinese pilots were young pilots of the Chinese Air Force, who had recently returned after completion of their training in the United States, lacking any combat experience, the unit was under an American commander, assisted by a staff of Chinese officers. The CACW was officially formed on 31 July 1943, and activated on 1 October 1943. The newly formed CACW were sent to Karachi, India, where they were re-equipped with B-25s and new P-40Ns, and trained under American supervision. Members of this unit including P-40N pilot Chen Bingjing escorted bombing missions against Japanese army positions in Vietnam beginning in October 1943.

On 25 November 1943, six B-25s from the 2nd Bomber Squadron of the CACW took off from Guilin at 6 am and staged through Suichwan, where they were refueled and joined by eight B-25s of the 11th Bomber Squadron and 16 fighter escorts of P-38s and P-51s from the 23rd Fighter Group of the 14th Air Force to attack Japan's largest air base in Taiwan, hitting a parking area, hangars, barracks, and buildings. The formation crossed the Taiwan Strait, flying at low altitude and caught the Japanese unprepared. 32 Japanese planes were destroyed in the air and on the ground while the Chinese did not lose a single plane. Seeing no opposing interceptors and only minimum anti-aircraft gun fire, Lieutenant Colonel Irving Branch of the CACW led his flight of bombers on a sweep down low strafing the airfield. The raid was the most successful thus far in the history of the 14th Air Force. Branch was awarded a Distinguish Flying Cross.

== 1944 ==
From late 1943 to the end of the war in August 1945, operations of the combined forces of the American and Chinese air units began to shift increasingly from defensive to offensive, and they eventually achieved air supremacy in China over Japanese air forces. It was made possible by the Americans' continuous supply of the latest war planes, fuel and material to China, and more importantly, the activation of the CACW as a unique Chinese component of the U.S. 14th Air Force, which was deployed in the China-Burma-India theatre, as well as the training by Americans of young Chinese pilots in the United States.

From 1944 onward, the CACW and other units of the Fourteenth Air Force were able to mount attacks against Japanese forces on all fronts in China, military installations, airbase in Taiwan, vital terminals of Japanese supply lines, which included Japanese-occupied river ports along the lower Yangtze River and Yellow River, seaports in southern China including Hong Kong and Hainan.

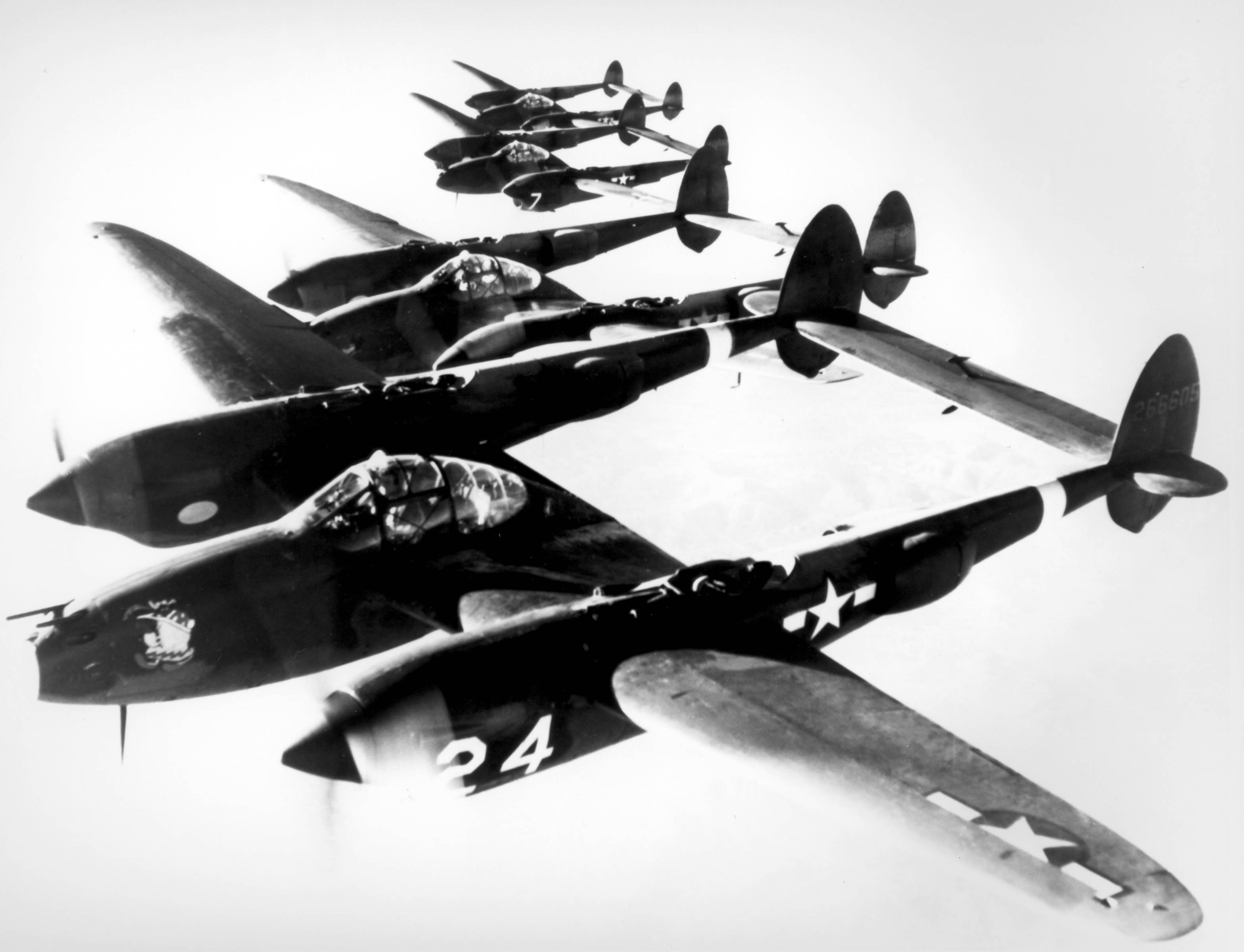
A U.S. formation of P-38 Lightnings

Separate missions were often flown daily by the CACW and other units of the 14th Air Force from different airbases with B-25 and B-24 bombers, P-40, P-38 and P-51 fighters. The following are some of the notable bombing missions and air combat on records during 1944.

On 11 February, six B-25 bombers escorted by 20 P-40 and P-51 fighters from the 14th Air Force including Chinese P-40s from the 32nd Fighter Squadron of the CACW bombed the storage area at Kai Tak Airfield, Hong Kong. The incoming formation encountered Japanese fighters from the 85th Sentai patrolling the area. In the ensuing air engagement the P-40s shot down five Japanese fighters and one probable, while the Japanese shot down one B-25, four P-40s and two P-51s and two probable fighters.

On 9 March, 18 CACW B-25s escorted by 24 P-40s bombed a foundry and floating docks at Huangshi in Hubei. They were intercepted by Japanese fighters from the 25th and 9th Sentai and lost 2 P-40s.

On 10 March, 2 bombers from the 2nd Bomber Squadron of the CACW bombed Japanese ships on the lower Yangtze; on returning flight one B-25 ran out of fuel and crash-landed killing its crew. On the same day, B-25s of the 14th Air Force escorted by P-38s attacked the river port at Anqing in Anhui. They sank a motor launch, damaged two cargo vessels and a barge; one of the Japanese intercepting fighters from the 25th Sentai flown by Moritsugu Kanai shot down one P-38.

On 29 March, 12 P-40s and three P-51s from the 14th Air Force attacked the railroad station area at Nanchang, and strafed the airfield and attacked a nearby bridge. Corporal Yasuzo Tanaka (Ki-44 Shoki-11) of the 25th Sentai was killed in Nanchang.

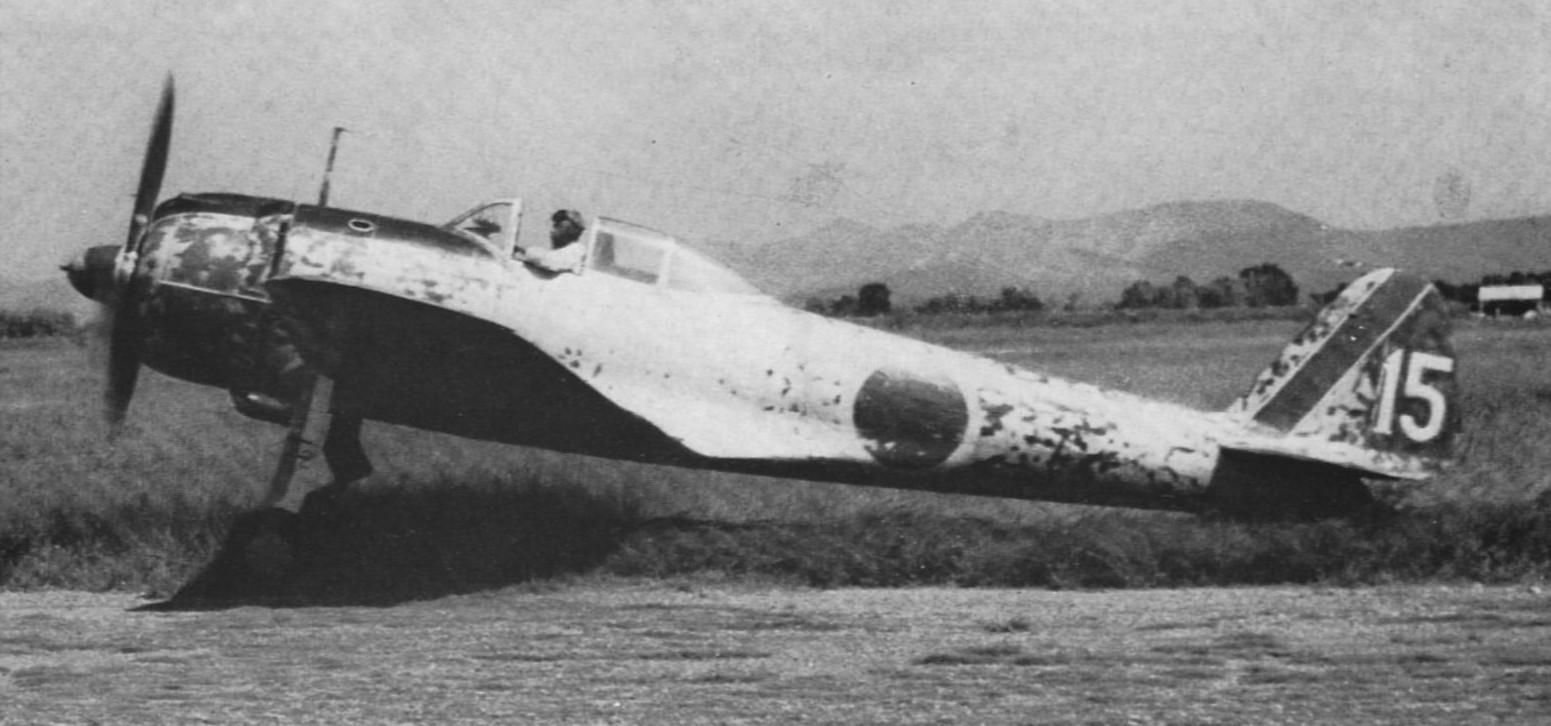
A Japanese Ki-43-IIa Army Type 1 fighter

On 5 April, 26 Japanese A6Ms from the Sanya and Kaiko Kōkūtai took off from Hainan and carried out a major attack on Nanning in Guangxi; they destroyed two B-25s and three P-40s on the ground, and shot down nine P-40s (two unconfirmed), while eight A6Ms were shot down and their pilots killed.

By mid April, various Japanese air units had suffered heavy losses and had been replenished. The 25th Sentai was brought up to full strength with young pilots from Japan.

On 28 April, 26 B-24s from the 14th Air Force escorted by ten P-51 fighters carried out a bombing mission on the storage area north of Zhengzhou at the lower reaches of the Yellow River. The Japanese warning radar at Kaifeng was out of order, and the 9th Sentai stationed at Xinxiang with 10 Ki-44s failed to intercept. The B-24s pounded the storage area and damaged the Bawangcheng Bridge and another bridge on Yellow River.

On 3 May, seven B-25s of the CACW bombed Mihsien and hit numerous vehicles and Japanese troops northeast of Mihsien near Yueyang in northeastern Hunan, and strafed the town of Hsiangcheng. On the same day, ten CACW P-40s hit and damaged a bridge on the Yellow River northwest of Chenghsien near Luoyang, and destroyed 15 trucks and many troops.

On 2 June in a battle at China's Central Plain, seven P-40Ns from the 7th fighter Squadron of the CACW made an attack on an airfield at Zhengzhou where a Japanese air transport unit was based. Seven Japanese K-44 fighters of the 9th Sentai led by Captain Kobayashi intercepted the Chinese P-40Ns, and shot down five, including the one flown by the Flight Commander Zhang Lemin. The 9th Sentai lost one flown by Sergeant Fumio Oguri over Bawangcheng.

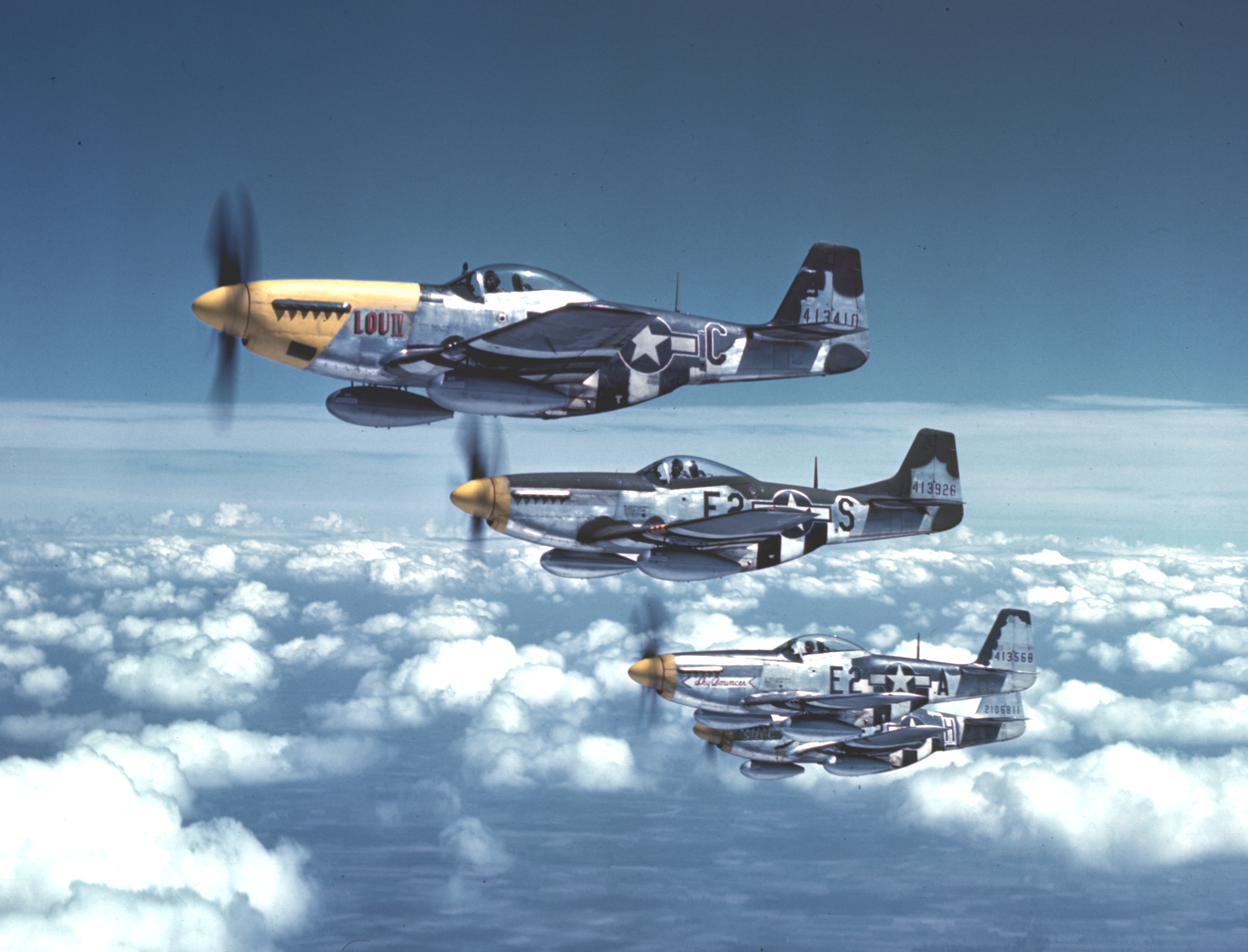
A U.S. fighter formation of P-51 Mustangs

On 12 June, about 100 P-40s and P-51s from the 14th Air Force attacked numerous supply boats and other river and lake traffic in the Dongting Lake area, and hit docks and warehouses at Yuanjiang, and also villages and troops in Changsha.

=== Battle of Gui-Liu ===
Capt Weng Xinhan, deputy commander of the 41st PS (the former French Volunteer Group Squadron that was disbanded in October 1938), died in course of the Battle of Gui-Liu on 12 September 1944 after being hit by anti-aircraft fire in his P-40, and crash-landing.

On 28 August, 32 P-40s from the 14th Air Force, including 11 from the 5th Fighter Squadron of the CACW, attacked the Japanese air base at Pailuchi and targets of opportunity at Hengyang. They were intercepted by Japanese K-43s from the 48th Sentai and Ki-84s from the 22nd Sentai. In the air battle, the Japanese destroyed one Chinese and three American P-40s while the CACW shot down six enemy planes; one of the pilots from the 49th Sentai reportedly parachuted from his burning Ki-84 but drowned in the Yangtze River.

On 29 August, 13 P-40s from the 3rd Fighter Group of the CACW bombed and strafed shipping and dock facilities at Shayang in Hubei. After the attack, they were intercepted by 21 Japanese fighters near Jiayu. The CACW claimed a total of seven victories with Group Commander Lieutenant Colonel Bill Reed and his wingman Lieutenant Tan Kun each shooting down one Ki-43, and the other Chinese P-40s claiming five Japanese fighters. Commander Meng Shao-yi of the 28th Squadron of the CACW was shot down and killed.

On 29 August around 1 pm, 13 Japanese Ki-84s from the 22nd Sentai and 16 Ki-43s from the 25th Sentai, a total of 29 fighters engaged a large number of B-24s, P-40s and P-51s of the 14th Air Force near Yueyang in northeastern Hunan. The Japanese shot down four P-40s and one P-51, and damaged four B-24s, four P-40s and one P-51, and lost one Ki-43 and one Ki-84, and suffered damage on one Ki-84.

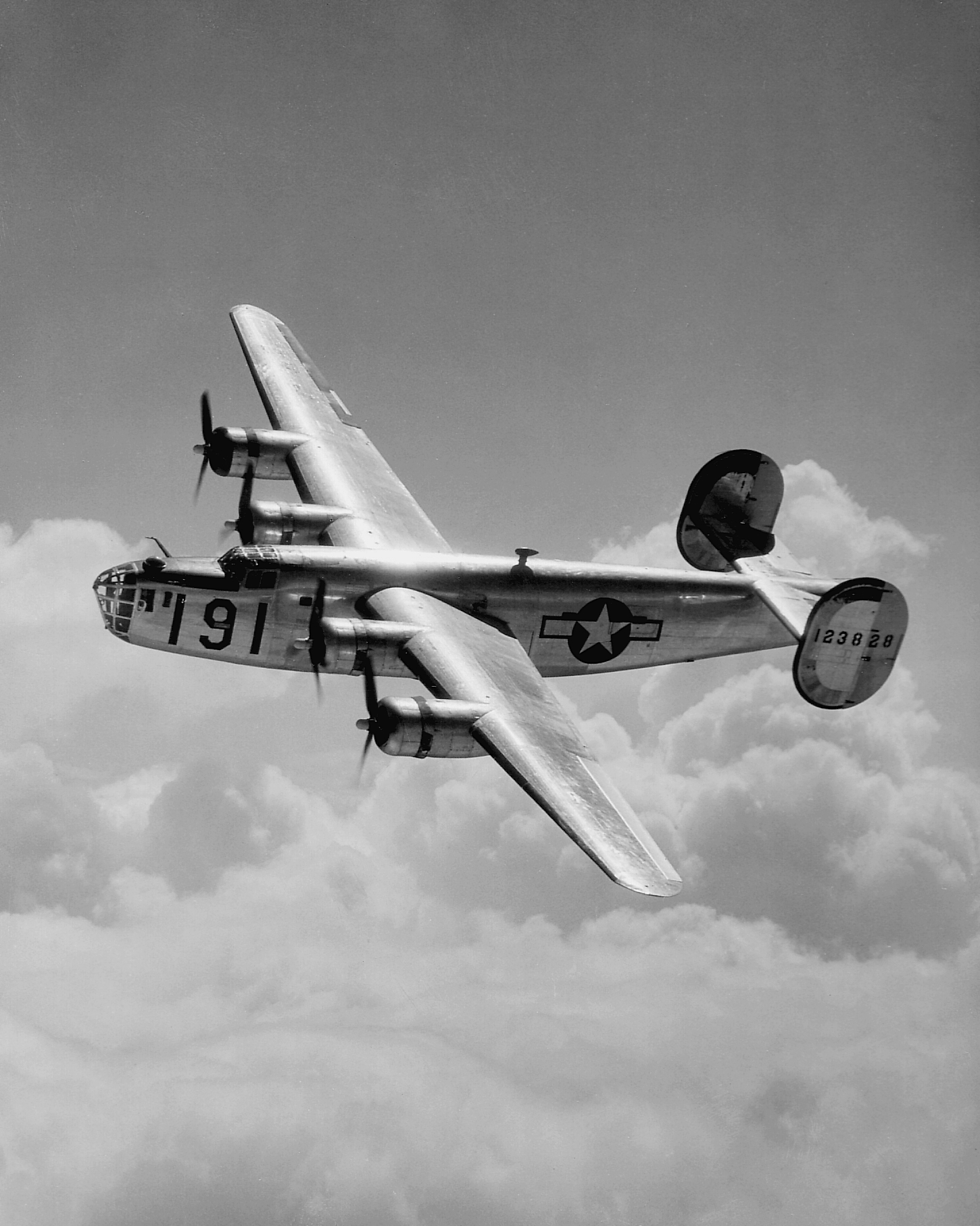
Consolidated B-24D Liberator Heavy bomber

On 12 September, two separate groups from the 5th Fighter Group of the CACW engaged in air battles over northeastern Hunan. First Lieutenant Phil Colman of the 26th Squadron claimed one damaged Ki-43, and his wingman Lieutenant Yang Shaohua claimed one Ki-43 shot down over Xiangtan; Colman further claimed one Ki-43, two damaged Ki-43s and a probable "Hamp" (A6M Type Zero) over Changsha. Another group of eight P-40s fought 12 Japanese fighters including six Ki-84s over Hengshan just south of Xiangtan; Captains Reynolds and Ramsey each claimed a damaged Japanese fighters, but Lieutenant Tom Brink was shot down while strafing, and one P-40 flown by Lieutenant Su Yinghai was badly damaged and written off after returning to base.

On 26 October B-24s and B-25s of the 14th Air Force attacked shipping off the east Leizhou Peninsula situated opposite to Hainan in the South China Sea. Major Horace S. Carswell Jr. of the 308th Bomber Group was awarded the Medal of Honour for his action on that day when he attacked a Japanese convoy in the South China Sea under intense anti-aircraft fire. His B-24, No. 44-40825 (MARC 9612) was so badly damaged that when his plane reached over land, he ordered the crew to bail out. One crew member could not jump because his parachute had been ripped by flak, so Carswell remained with the aircraft to try to save the crew member by attempting to crash land. Before Carswell could attempt a crash landing, the bomber struck a mountainside and burned.

By the end of 1944, the continued bombings and attacks on Japanese supply lines and storage facilities in Japanese-occupied China had caused a severe shortage of fuel greatly hampering the operations of Japanese air units. The American and Chinese air forces in China had inflicted heavy losses to the Japanese air forces operating in China, and forced the Japanese to adopt a defensive stance.

== 1945 ==
On 28 January 1945, the Burma Road was fully restored as a land transport route for war material supplied to China by the Allies. It had been cut off when Japanese invaded Burma in 1942, leaving available only the air supply route over "The Hump", from Assam, India, over the eastern end of the Himalayas. The re-opening of the Burma Road greatly increased the supply of aircraft, spare parts, fuel and other war material as required for the successful prosecution of the war.

In the beginning of 1945, the total numbers of the Chinese and American air forces exceeded 800 aircraft. During the concluding period of the war from January to June 1945, the Chinese pilots and their American counterparts participated actively in battles supporting ground forces on all fronts in central, southern and eastern China.

The CACW unofficial combat record in the time from its activation on 1 October 1943 to the end of the war in August 1945 included 190 Japanese aircraft destroyed in the air, 301 on the ground. At the same time, they lost 35 fighters and eight bombers to enemy ground fire, and 20 fighters to Japanese aircraft. However, not a single CACW bomber was lost to enemy fighters, a tribute to the abilities of the Wing's B-25 aircrews, and the quality of the escort protection provided by the Wing's fighter pilots. The CACW produced five American air aces and three Chinese air aces, and was disbanded on 19 September 1945.

The following are some of the notable air operations in 1945.

On 5 January a combined group of 28 P-40N and P-51D fighters from the 14th Air Force flew from Laohekou in Hubei to attack the Japanese airfield at Wuhan, destroying 50 Japanese aircraft in the air and on the ground. One Chinese pilot was shot down and killed in the air battle.

On 9 March about 50 fighters and bombers from the 14th Air Force on armed reconnaissance attacked railroad targets, river and road traffic, bridges, gun positions, and troops at several locations, particularly around Guiyi, Hengyang, Nanjing and Xinyang.

On 10 March about 60 fighters and bombers from the 14th Air Force hit targets in rivers, on roads and railroads, gun positions, warehouses, airstrips, and troops around Xinyang, Yiyang, Changsha, Qiyang, Yueyang, Hengyang in Hunan, and Hankou, and Wuchang in the neighboring Hubei province.

On 16 March, 32 B-24s from the 14th Air Force escorted by 10 P-51s pounded the north railroad yards at Shijiazhuang.

On 15 April, about 200 fighters and bombers from the 14th Air Force attacked Japanese targets in areas from southern China to the northern China plain hitting numerous targets including bridges, river shipping, town areas, trucks, railroad traffic, gun positions, storage areas, and general targets of opportunity.

On 8 May, Japanese forces moved the bulk of their 5th Kokugun to Korea. It involved the relocation of some 10,000 ground support personnel, leaving a skeleton of air units in China. The move was completed by the end of the month with only minor losses.

On 10 August, about 50 P-47s and P-51s from the 14th Air Force attacked river and railroad targets, troops, trucks, and bridges at several points in southern and eastern China.

On 15 August, Japan's unconditional surrender was announced, and all offensive operations against Japan ended.

On 18 August, the vice-commander of the 24th Pursuit Squadron from the Chinese Air Force, Guo Fengwu flew over Guisui (known as Hohhot after 1954) in Inner Mongolia to drop leaflets which contained the text of Japanese Emperor Hirohito's surrender decree. He was shot down by Japanese anti-aircraft gun fire, and became the last casualty of the Chinese Air Force in the eight-year-long war.

On 2 September 1945, hostilities with Japan ended officially with the signing of the instrument of surrender aboard the USS Missouri (BB-63) in Tokyo Bay.

== CACW Composition ==
Chinese-American Composite Wing (CACW)

- 1st Bombardment Group
  - 1st Bombardment Squadron
  - 2nd Bombardment Squadron
  - 3rd Bombardment Squadron
  - 4th Bombardment Squadron
- 3rd Fighter Group
  - 7th Fighter Squadron
  - 8th Fighter Squadron
  - 28th Fighter Squadron
  - 32nd Fighter Squadron
- 5th Fighter Group
  - 17th Fighter Squadron
  - 26th Fighter Squadron
  - 27th Fighter Squadron
  - 29th Fighter Squadron

== Aircraft types used ==
Some of the aircraft types used in the Second Sino-Japanese War:

Chinese and American Air Units

- Italian built:
  - Fiat CR-32, biplane fighter
  - Breda Ba. 27, monoplane fighter
- British built: Gloster Gladiator, biplane fighter
- German Built: Henschel Hs 123, biplane dive bomber
- Japanese Built: Nakajima Type 91, parasol monoplane fighter
- U.S. built:
  - Douglas O-2MC, biplane scout/light bomber
  - Boeing Model 281 (P-26C) Peashooter, monoplane fighter
  - Curtiss XF11C Goshawk (P-6 Hawk II), biplane fighter
  - Curtiss BF2C Goshawk (Hawk III), biplane fighter
  - Curtiss Hawk 75M, monoplane fighter
  - Curtiss P-40 Tomahawk, Warhawk, Kittyhawk, monoplane fighter
  - Vultee P-66 Vanguard, monoplane fighter
  - Republic P-43 Lancer, monoplane fighter
  - Republic P-47 Thunderbolt, monoplane fighter
  - North American P-51 Mustang, monoplane fighter
  - Lockheed P-38 Lightning, twin booms fighter/bomber
  - Lockheed A-29 Hudson, 2-engine medium bomber/reconnaissance
  - North American B-25 Mitchell, 2-engine medium bomber
  - Consolidated B-24 Liberator, long range 4-engine heavy bomber
- Soviet built:
  - Polikarpov I-15, biplane fighter
  - Polikarpov I-152, biplane fighter
  - Polikarpov I-153, biplane fighter
  - Polikarpov I-16, monoplane fighter
  - Tupolev SB, 2-engine medium bomber
  - Tupolev TB-3, 4-engine long-range heavy bomber

Japanese Air Units

- Kawasaki Ki-10, Army Type 95, biplane fighter (Allied codename Perry)
- Mitsubishi A5M, Navy type 96, monoplane fighter (Allied codename Claude)
- Mitsubishi A6M, Navy type 0, monoplane fighter (Allied codename Zeke)
- Mitsubishi Ki-21, Army type 97, twin engine medium bomber (Allied codename Sally)
- Nakajima Ki-27, Army type 97, monoplane fighter (Allied codename Nate)
- Mitsubishi Ki-30, Army type 97, single engine light bomber (Allied codename Ann)
- Kawasaki Ki-32, Army type 98, single engine light bomber (Allied codename Mary)
- Nakajima Ki-43, Army type 1, monoplane fighter (Allied codename Oscar)
- Nakajima Ki-44, Army type 2, monoplane fighter (Allied codename Tojo)
- Nakajima Ki-84, Army type 4, monoplane fighter (Allied codename Frank)
- Kawasaki Ki-48, Army type 99, twin-engine medium bomber (Allied codename Lily)
- Mitsubishi G3M, Navy Type 96, land-based attack bomber (Allied codename Nell)
- Mitsubishi G4M, Navy Type 1, attack bomber twin-engine long-range bomber (Allied codename Betty)
- Italian built: Fiat BR.20, 2-engine medium bomber

== See also ==
- Development of Chinese Nationalist air force (1937–1945)
- Flying Tigers
- Order of Battle for Battle of South Guangxi
- Soviet Volunteer Group
