= Chongqing Airport (disambiguation) =

Chongqing Airport primarily refers to Chongqing Jiangbei International Airport in Yubei, Chongqing, China.

Chongqing Airport may also refer to:

- Chongqing Wushan Airport
- Chongqing Xiannüshan Airport
- Chongqing Baishiyi Airport
- Chongqing Guangyangba Airport
