= Innovation (TV program) =

American television series

Innovation is an American television program that aired on PBS from 1984 to 2004. It covered topics on science, health and technology. The program was produced at New York City public TV station WNET.

== Overview ==
Innovation was conceived by Executive Producer Bill Einreinhofer and hosted by broadcast journalist Jim Hartz.

Initially a local magazine-style program, each half-hour episode was dedicated to a single topic. Among the subjects explored were flight, the impact of stress on personal health, animal intelligence and diabetes, along with how technology was transforming the ways people live and work.

By the early 1990s, as PBS moved away from half-hour prime time programming, Innovation evolved into a continuing series of documentary specials, sometimes covering a single topic over a set of episodes.

The final episodes of Innovation aired on PBS in 2004.

== People in Motion ==
One of the Innovation set of episodes was called People in Motion, which looked at technology as a method of personal empowerment for people with disabilities. People in Motion comprised three episodes, hosted by the musician Itzhak Perlman, that aired in 1995. Three additional programs, broadcast in 1996, were hosted by actress Marlee Matlin.

== Awards and honors ==
The series garnered numerous honors and awards from the National Academy of Television Arts and Sciences (NY Emmy Awards). Programs from the series are included in the permanent collections of hundreds of libraries worldwide.
