= Zheng Shaoyu =

China Air Force officer

- 鄭少愚 / 鄭士璽
- Born: Zheng Shaoyu / Zheng Shixi (Chinese: 郑少愚); 1911; Dazhou, Qu County, Sichuan, China
- Died: April 22, 1942 (aged 30); Jaipur, India en route to Kunming, China
- Military career
- Allegiance: Republic of China
- Branch: Republic of China Air Force
- Service years: 1934–42
- Rank: Lieutenant Colonel (posthumous)
- Unit: 22nd PS/4th PG
- Commands: 4th PG CO (1940-42)
- Conflicts: War of Resistance/WWII: Battle of Shanghai; Battle of Nanking; Battle of Wuhan; Battle of South Guangxi; Battle of Chongqing-Chengdu; CBI †

Zheng Shaoyu (Chinese: 郑少愚; pinyin: Zhèng Shǎoyú; 1911–1942), also spelled Cheng Hsiao-yu (Wades-Gile), was a Chinese fighter pilot in the Second Sino-Japanese War of World War 2. He was born in Qu County of Sichuan province. In 1933–1934, he passed initial qualifications for admission into the China Central Aviation School at Jianqiao Airbase. He graduated top-3 in the class in 1935. When the War of Resistance/World War II broke out between China and the Empire of Japan following the 7/7 Incident, then-Lieutenant Zheng Shaoyu was attached to the 22nd PS, 4th PG at Zhoujiakou Airbase of the centralized Chinese Nationalist Air Force in anticipation of operations in the northern front. On 13 August 1937, his fighter squadron would immediately be redirected from Zhoujiakou to Hangzhou Airbase, 175 kilometres (109 mi) southwest of Shanghai to engage the Imperial Japanese at what filmmaker Bill Einreinhofer would claim in a documentary to be the first major battle of World War II in Asia, the Battle of Shanghai.

Lt. Col. Zheng Shaoyu was the fourth commanding officer of the famed "Zhihang Fighter Group" (the 4th PG), after Capt Wang Tianxiang, Col. Gao Zhihang himself, and Capt. Li Guidan to die in the war against Imperial Japan.

Zheng Shaoyu was portrayed in the patriotic war drama Heroes of the Eastern Skies (1977).
