= Bill Einreinhofer =

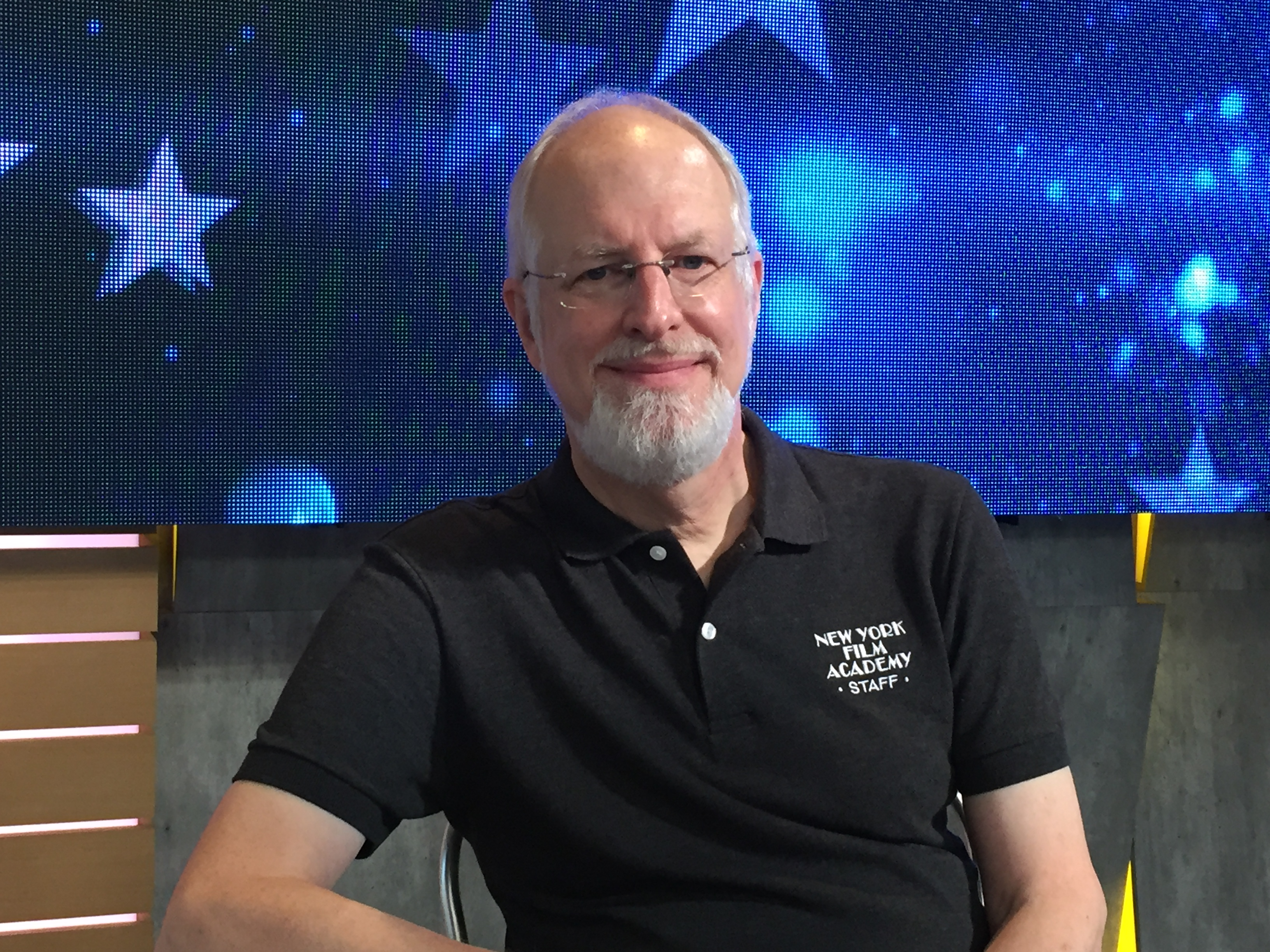
- Born: Rutherford, New Jersey, U.S.
- Education: Saint Peter's University; University of Wisconsin–Madison
- Years active: 1978-present

Bill Einreinhofer is an American television producer, director, writer and educator. Early in his career, he was an executive producer at WNET in New York and for the PBS series Innovation. In his later career, he has focused on documentary work in and about China. His 2026 travel documentary America's Main Street: I-80, was seen on 200+ Public TV stations, as well as VOD platforms including the PBS App.

He is Chair Emeritus of the Broadcast Journalism department at the New York Film Academy. He has also taught and co-taught media and journalism seminars in Asia. He is a member of the Directors Guild of America.

== Early life and education ==
Einreinhofer was born and raised in Rutherford, New Jersey.

Einreinhofer attended Saint Peter's University, where he worked as a DJ and producer at the campus radio station. He graduated in 1974 with a degree in history. He holds a master's degree in communication from the University of Wisconsin–Madison, where he began making documentaries in the 1970s.

== Career ==
From 1978 to 1982, he produced multiple mini documentaries for the New Jersey Nightly News (WNET and New Jersey Public Television). Earlier, he was a producer-writer for Dateline: New Jersey and was producer-host for the syndicated radio series Jazz Evolution. In 1982, he was named executive producer for WNET's New Jersey programing.

He conceived and was executive producer of Innovation, the long running PBS science, health and technology news series. This included supervising production of the Innovation mini-series People in Motion. Hosted by Itzhak Perlman and Marlee Matlin, People in Motion was praised for its focus on technology as a means of empowerment for people with disabilities.

By 1993, he was an executive producer of scientific programing for WNET.

He was executive producer of the independent feature film Invisible Love (2020), the story of a young, idealistic woman repeatedly betrayed by the men in her life. A China/Vietnam/US co-production, the film is set during the 1930s in what was then known as French Indochina. The film was selected Best International Feature at the 2021 Paris International Film Festival.

Bill Einreinhofer is also responsible for numerous corporate video productions. He is a member of the Directors Guild of America.

His op-ed essays have appeared online and in numerous publications including The New York Times.

=== Coverage of China ===
Einreinhofer first visited China in 1989, while working on Innovation. He has produced an extensive body of work in and about China. His first program was the public television documentary China Now: To Get Rich Is Glorious, which explored what China's leaders dubbed "socialism with Chinese characteristics."

He was series producer of Beyond Beijing, a four-part documentary series which seen by television viewers in 43 countries, as well as a 120-minute educational and home video version. Tied to the 2008 Summer Olympics, the series explored the six Chinese cities in addition to Beijing that hosted Olympic events.

Einreinhofer was the presenter and script consultant for seasons one and two of the international version of Century Masters, a documentary series on figures in 20th-century Chinese history. The se

=== Teaching ===
He is Chair Emeritus of the Broadcast Journalism department at the New York Film Academy, having joined the faculty of the school in 2013. In 2020, he conceived, and co-taught, a three-week Moscow Journalism Summer School, which attracted early career journalists from across Russia. Later in the year he co-taught a seminar on "Production 'Best Practices' in the Era of COVID-19" at Astana Media Week, an online gathering of 1,000+ media executives from throughout Central Asia. Both projects were supported by the U.S. State Department.

He was previously an adjunct professor in the Communications program at Felician College on their Rutherford, New Jersey campus. From 2012 through 2018 he was the producer/writer of an ongoing pro bono series of local oral history videos, Rutherford Historic Narratives, created for the Rutherford Civil Rights Commission.

== Filmography ==
Documentaries
Year	Title	Subject	Distributor	Notes	Ref
	China Now: To Get Rich Is Glorious	Socialism with Chinese characteristics			
2005	So Very Far From Home	American children in Japanese-occupied China during World War II		American-Chinese co-production	
	The Hidden China	American investors visiting China			
	Sichuan Stories	Work of Save The Children in China			
2012	Every Day Is A Holiday	A Chinese-American woman and her Chinese immigrant father			
2018	Shanghai 1937: Where World War II Began	1937 Battle of Shanghai	American Public Television (APT) in the U.S.; ZDF in Germany		
2022	Unsettled History: America, China and the Doolittle Tokyo Raid	1942 Doolittle Raid of Tokyo	American Public Television (APT)		
2023	China: Frame by Frame	Einreinhofer's experiences covering China	National Educational Telecommunications Association (NETA)		
2024	Valor and Memory	Flying Tigers			
2025	Your Serve or Mine	History of "ping pong diplomacy" between the U.S. and China			

== Awards ==
Year	Award	Category	Work	Result	Ref
1982-1983	New York Emmy Awards	Outstanding Magazine Format Programming	Innovation	Won	
1983-1984	New York Emmy Awards	Outstanding Special Interest Programming	Innovation	Won	
1987-1988	New York Emmy Awards	Outstanding Writer (Non-News)	"Not Just Pets" (Innovation)	Won	

== Archives ==
The University of Southern California is home to the Bill Einreinhofer China Archive. Hosted by USC’s East Asian Library, the collection has over 1,500 digital video, image, audio, and text files, available to scholars, researchers, students and the general public. A portion of the material can be viewed online.

In fall 2023, Einreinhofer donated materials to the O'Toole Library at Saint Peter's University.
