= Cen Zeliu =

Republic of China Air Force officer

- 岑泽鎏
- Born: (Chinese: 岑泽鎏); September 10, 1912; Juntang, Enping, Guangzhou, China
- Died: March 14, 1941 (aged 28); Shuangliu, Chengdu, Sichuan, China
- Military career
- Allegiance: Republic of China
- Branch: Republic of China Air Force
- Service years: 1934–41
- Rank: Major
- Unit: 8th PS/3rd PG
- Commands: 17th PS/5th PG
- Conflicts: War of Resistance/WWII: Battle of Shanghai; Battle of Nanking; Battle of Wuhan; Battle of Lanzhou/Northwest; Battle of Chengdu-Chongqing
- Awards: Star Medal 8th Class

Cen Zeliu (Chinese: 岑泽鎏; pinyin: Cén Zéliú; Wade–Giles: Ts'en Chih-liu/Shen Tse-Liu; 1912–1941), also Shum Tsak-lau (Cantonese), was born in Enping, Guangdong, China. He trained at the Guangdong provincial aviation academy as a fighter pilot, graduating in 1934, and was attached to the provincial warlord air force of General Chen Jitang. With full-scale war between China and the Empire of Japan brewing ever since the Mukden incident of 1931, Cen Zeliu and his compatriots were eager to focus on fighting the Imperial Japanese invasion and occupation of China.

In May 1936, General Chen Jitang conspired with the New Guangxi Clique to overthrow Chiang Kai-shek as leader of the central government of China, which Cen Zeliu perceived as weakening Chinese unity against Japan. This set the stage for Cen Zeliu and members of the Guangdong Air Force under General Huang Guangrui, the air force's Commander-in-Chief, to embark on the "Northern Flight" (北飛) defection to the centralized Nationalist Air Force of China in the midst of the Liangguang Incident in June–July 1936.
