= Chongqing Guangyangba Airport =

Airport in Chongqing, China

Chongqing Guangyangba Airport (simplified Chinese: 重庆广阳坝机场; traditional Chinese: 重慶廣陽壩機場), also known as Guangyangba Air Base, was a military and civilian airport in China, located about 11 kilometres (6.8 mi) east of Chongqing. This airport was built by the warlord Liu Xiang in 1929 as a military base. It was the first airport built in southwestern China.

== The airport ==
The airport was located on Guangyang Isle. The length of the runway was 1,100 metres (3,600 ft) and the width was 40 metres (130 ft). During World War II, this airport was one of the seven airports in the Chongqing region used for the air defense of the China's capital city. However, during the rainy season, when the civil airport of Chongqing (the Shanhuba Airport) was not suitable for landing, Guangyangba Airport also served as a civil aviation station for Chongqing region. After the opening of Chongqing Baishiyi Air Base, Guangyangba Airport was gradually abandoned.

== The location ==
The Guangyang Isle is an island on the Yangtze River, with an area of 6.4 square kilometres (2.5 sq mi). It is located at the down-stream mouth of Tongluo Valley. The altitude range of the island is from 200 to 280 metres (660 to 920 ft). The site of the airport had an elevation of 220 metres (720 ft).

The location of Guangyangba Airport

== See also ==
- Black Christmas disaster; the triple aviation-accident tragedies involving flights originating from Chongqing on Christmas day in 1946
