= Oil embargo =

An oil embargo is an economical sanction which limits the transport of petroleum to or from an area, in order to exact some desired outcome. One commentator states, "an oil embargo is not a common commercial practice; it is a tool of political blackmail, meant to force those at whom it is aimed, into some action they would otherwise not be willing to take".

Notable examples of international oil embargoes include:

- Oil embargo (Sino-Japanese War), 1941–1945
- Embargo against Francoist Spain, 1944
- 1967 Oil Embargo
- 1973 oil crisis
- 1979 oil crisis
- Embargo against Apartheid South Africa, 1987–1993
- Embargo against Iran, 2012–2016
- Embargo of Russian oil during the Russo-Ukrainian war (2022–)
- United States oil blockade during Operation Southern Spear (2026)
- 2026 Strait of Hormuz crisis (2026–)
