= Jianjun =

Jianjun is a Chinese given name. Notable people with the given name include:

- Cui Jianjun (born 1985), male Chinese volleyball player
- Jianjun Dong (born 1988), Chinese heavyweight professional boxer (ring name Taishan Dong)
- He Jianjun (born 1960), Chinese film director and screenwriter
- Li Jianjun (born 1977), investigative journalist in the People's Republic of China
- Liu Jianjun (born 1969), male Chinese badminton player
- Lü Jianjun (born 1985), Chinese football player
- Ma Jianjun (born 1984), male Chinese water polo player
- Mei Jianjun (梅建军), archaeo-metallurgist
- Jianjun Shi (born 1963), Chinese-born American engineer and professor
- Wang Jianjun (born 1958), Chinese provincial politician, CPC Secretary of Qinghai Province
- Wei Jianjun (born 1964), Chinese businessman, chairman of Great Wall Motors, the largest Chinese SUV manufacturer
- Jianjun Xu (born 1995), Chinese footballer
- Zhu Jianjun (1447–1487), Chenghua Emperor, was the ninth Emperor of the Ming dynasty, who reigned from 1464 to 1487

== See also ==
- Jiajun
- Jiangjun (disambiguation)
- Jin Jian
- Junjun (disambiguation)
