= Battle of Nanking =

1937 battle of the Second Sino-Japanese War

- Part of the Second Sino-Japanese War and the interwar period
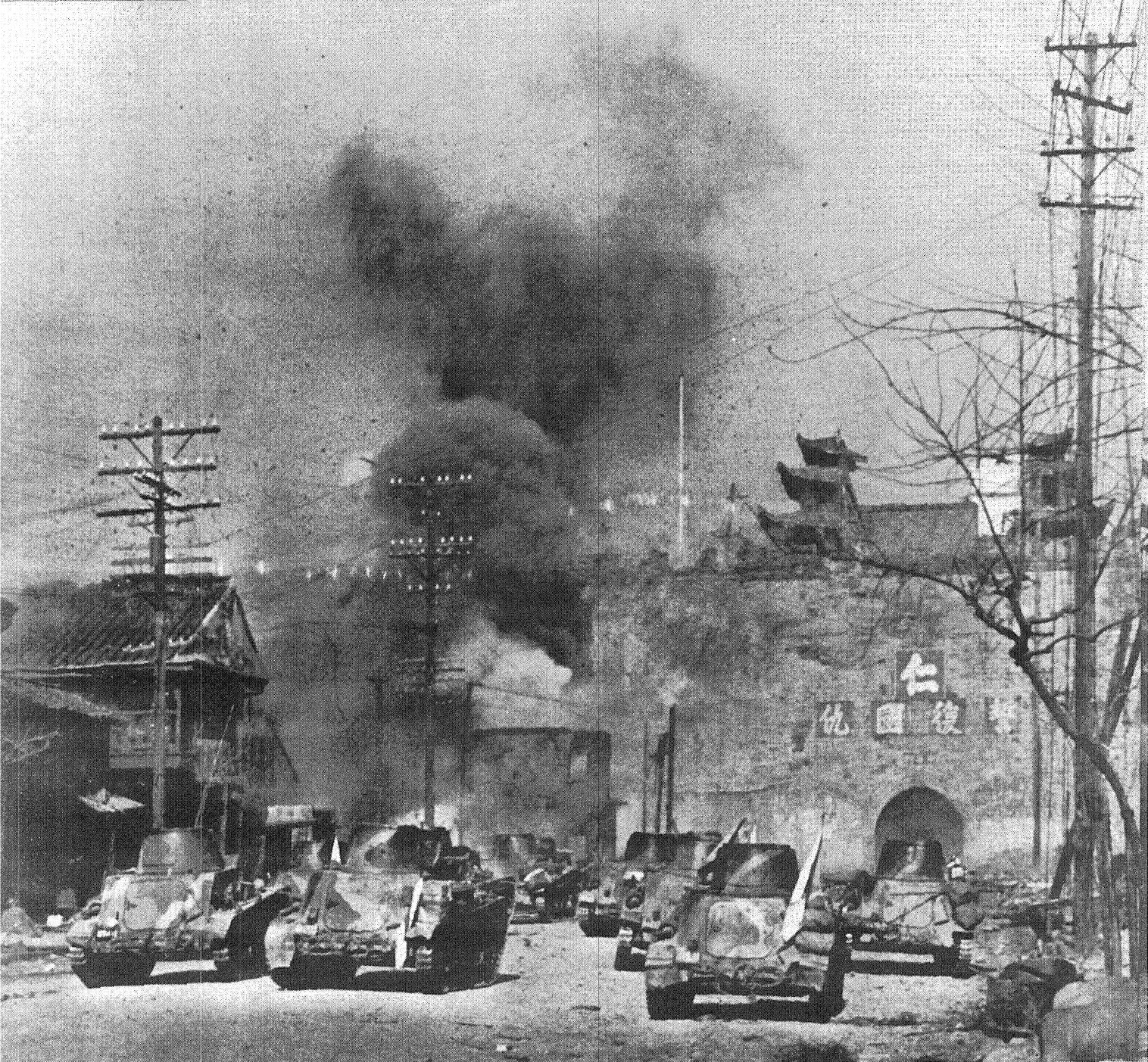
- Japanese tanks attacking Nanjing's Zhonghua Gate under artillery fire
Date	November 11 – December 13, 1937 (1 month and 2 days)
Location	Nanjing city and surrounding areas in the Republic of China 32°00′50″N 118°46′35″E
Result	Japanese victory
Territorial changes	Fall of Nanjing; China moves its capital to Hankou

Belligerents
China; Soviet Union	Japan

Commanders and leaders
(Republic of China (1912–1949)) Tang Shengzhi (Republic of China (1912–1949)) Xiao Shanling †	(Empire of Japan) Iwane Matsui (Empire of Japan) Prince Asaka (Empire of Japan) Heisuke Yanagawa

Units involved
Nanjing Garrison Force; Soviet Volunteer Group	Central China Area Army

Strength
Campaign total: ~100,000 Battle of Nanjing: 73,790 to 81,500; At least 116,919 (Note: Based on various archival records and detailed battle reports stored in the Second Historical Archives of China and generals' recollections)	Campaign total: 200,000 Battle of Nanjing: 70,000

Casualties and losses
Battle for Nanjing: At least 47,382 killed in action or trapped in Nanjing after its fall, 25,546 confirmed broke out, 44,730 unknown 13,000 to 20,000 killed in action 30,000+ POWs executed after capture Postwar estimates: 5 November to 2 December 1937: ~100,000 casualties Japanese claim: Along the Lake Tai front (early to late November) : 53,000 killed; In Nanjing : 84,000 killed and 10,500 captured	Battle for Nanjing: 1,558 killed 4,619 wounded (Note: Does not include the losses of the Yamada Detachment of the 13th division) Campaign total: Japanese archives: 26,000 killed and wounded
- 100,000–300,000 POWs and civilians killed in the subsequent massacre

Battle of Nanking

Chinese name
- Traditional Chinese: 南京保衛戰
- Simplified Chinese: 南京保卫战
- Literal meaning: Battle to Defend Nanjing
Transcriptions
Standard Mandarin
- Hanyu Pinyin: Nánjīng Bǎowèi Zhàn
- Bopomofo: ㄋㄢˊ ㄐㄧㄥ ㄅㄠˇ ㄨㄟˋ ㄓㄢˋ
- Wade–Giles: Nan^{2}-ching^{1} Pao^{3}-wei^{4} Chan^{4}
- IPA: [nǎntɕíŋ pàʊwêɪ ʈʂân]

Japanese name
- Kanji: 南京戦
- Kana: なんきんせん
Transcriptions
- Romanization: Nankin-sen

The Battle of Nanking (or Nanjing) was fought in early December 1937 during the Second Sino-Japanese War between the Chinese National Revolutionary Army and the Imperial Japanese Army for control of Nanjing (Chinese: 南京; pinyin: Nánjīng), the capital of the Republic of China.

After Japan and China went to war in July 1937, their forces fought the vicious three-month Battle of Shanghai, both suffering heavy casualties. The Japanese eventually won the battle, forcing the Chinese army to withdraw. Capitalizing on their victory, the Japanese authorized a campaign to capture Nanjing. The task of occupying Nanjing was given to General Iwane Matsui, the commander of Japan's Central China Area Army, who believed that the capture of the national capital would force China to surrender. Chinese leader Chiang Kai-shek decided to defend the city and appointed Tang Shengzhi to command the Nanjing Garrison Force, a hastily assembled army of local conscripts and the remnants of the Chinese units who had fought in Shanghai.

From November 11 to December 9, the Japanese army rapidly marched from Shanghai to Nanjing, pursuing the retreating Chinese army and overcoming all Chinese resistance in its way. The campaign was marked by tremendous brutality and destruction, with increasing levels of atrocities committed by Japanese forces against the local population, while Chinese forces implemented scorched-earth tactics to slow the Japanese advances.

Nevertheless, by December 9 the Japanese had reached the last line of defense, the Fukuo Line, behind which lay Nanjing's fortified walls. On December 10 Matsui ordered an all-out attack on Nanjing, and after two days of intense fighting Chiang decided to abandon the city. To prevent the Nanjing defenders from being surrounded and annihilated by the enemy, Chiang Kai-shek considered ordering a retreat at noon on the 11th. He then instructed Gu Zhutong, then in Jiangbei, to convey this message by phone to Tang Shengzhi. Gu instructed Tang to cross the river north that night and order the defenders to break out if necessary. Tang Shengzhi, having previously advocated for a firm hold, feared the potential liability of a sudden withdrawal. Therefore, he demanded that the Supreme Commander's intentions be clearly conveyed to the defending generals before any withdrawal could be allowed. Tang Shengzhi, a man of urgency, insisted on receiving Chiang Kai-shek's personal order before retreating. That evening, Chiang Kai-shek indeed telegraphed Tang Shengzhi: "If the situation cannot be sustained, you may retreat if necessary to regroup and prepare for a counterattack." Tang ordered his men to launch a concerted breakout of the Japanese siege, but by this time Nanjing was largely surrounded and its defenses were at the breaking point. Most of Tang's troops collapsed in a disorganized rout. While some units were able to escape, many more were caught in the death trap the city had become. By December 13, Nanjing had fallen to the Japanese.

After the capture of the city, Japanese forces massacred Chinese prisoners of war, murdered civilians, and committed acts of looting, torture, and rape in the Nanjing Massacre. Though the victory excited and emboldened Japan, the subsequent massacre tarnished their reputation in the eyes of the world. Contrary to Matsui's expectations, China did not surrender and the Second Sino-Japanese War continued for another eight years, leading to the surrender of Japan.

== Background ==
=== Japan's decision to capture Nanjing ===
The conflict which would become known as the Second Sino-Japanese War started on July 7, 1937, with a skirmish at Marco Polo Bridge which escalated rapidly into a full-scale war in northern China between the armies of China and Japan. China, however, wanted to avoid a decisive confrontation in the north and so instead opened a second front by attacking Japanese units in Shanghai in central China. The Japanese responded by dispatching the Shanghai Expeditionary Army (SEA), commanded by General Iwane Matsui, to drive the Chinese Army from Shanghai. Intense fighting in Shanghai forced Japan's Army General Staff, which was in charge of military operations, to repeatedly reinforce the SEA, and finally on November 9 an entirely new army, the 10th Army commanded by Lieutenant General Heisuke Yanagawa, was also landed at Hangzhou Bay just south of Shanghai.

Although the arrival of the 10th Army succeeded at forcing the Chinese Army to retreat from Shanghai, the Japanese Army General Staff had decided to adopt a policy of non-expansion of hostilities with the aim of ending the war. On November 7 its de facto leader Deputy Chief of Staff Hayao Tada laid down an "operation restriction line" preventing its forces from leaving the vicinity of Shanghai, or more specifically from going west of the Chinese cities of Suzhou and Jiaxing. The city of Nanjing is roughly 300 kilometers (190 miles) west of Shanghai.

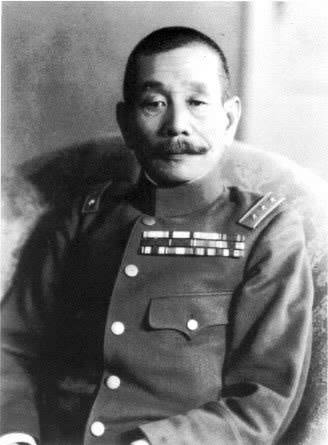
Japanese General Iwane Matsui

However, a major rift of opinion existed between the Japanese government and its two field armies, the SEA and 10th Army, which as of November were both nominally under the control of the Central China Area Army led by SEA commander Matsui. Matsui made clear to his superiors even before he left for Shanghai that he wanted to march on Nanjing. He was convinced that the conquest of the Chinese capital city of Nanjing would provoke the fall of the entire Nationalist Government of China and thus hand Japan a quick and complete victory in its war on China. Yanagawa was likewise eager to conquer Nanjing and both men chafed under the operation restriction line that had been imposed on them by the Army General Staff.

On November 19 Yanagawa ordered his 10th Army to pursue retreating Chinese forces across the operation restriction line to Nanjing, a flagrant act of insubordination. When Tada discovered this the next day he ordered Yanagawa to stop immediately, but was ignored. Matsui made some effort to restrain Yanagawa, but also told him that he could send some advance units beyond the line. In fact, Matsui was highly sympathetic with Yanagawa's actions and a few days later on November 22 Matsui issued an urgent telegram to the Army General Staff insisting that "To resolve this crisis in a prompt manner we need to take advantage of the enemy's present declining fortunes and conquer Nanking ... By staying behind the operation restriction line at this point we are not only letting our chance to advance slip by, but it is also having the effect of encouraging the enemy to replenish their fighting strength and recover their fighting spirit and there is a risk that it will become harder to completely break their will to make war."

Meanwhile, as more and more Japanese units continued to slip past the operation restriction line, Tada was also coming under pressure from within the Army General Staff. Many of Tada's colleagues and subordinates, including the powerful Chief of the General Staff Operations Division Sadamu Shimomura, had come around to Matsui's viewpoint and wanted Tada to approve an attack on Nanjing. On November 24 Tada finally relented and abolished the operation restriction line "owing to circumstances beyond our control", and then several days later he reluctantly approved the operation to capture Nanjing. Tada flew to Shanghai in person on December 1 to deliver the order, though by then his own armies in the field were already well on their way to Nanjing.

=== China's decision to defend Nanjing ===
On November 15, near the end of the Battle of Shanghai, Chiang Kai-shek convened a meeting of the Military Affairs Commission's Supreme National Defense Council to undertake strategic planning, including a decision on what to do in case of a Japanese attack on Nanjing. Here Chiang insisted fervently on mounting a sustained defense of Nanjing. Chiang argued, just as he had during the Battle of Shanghai, that China would be more likely to receive aid from the great powers, possibly at the ongoing Nine Power Treaty Conference, if it could prove on the battlefield its will and capacity to resist the Japanese. He also noted that holding onto Nanjing would strengthen China's hand in peace talks which he wanted the German ambassador Oskar Trautmann to mediate.

Chiang ran into stiff opposition from his officers, including the powerful Chief of Staff of the Military Affairs Commission He Yingqin, the Deputy Chief of Staff Bai Chongxi, the head of the Fifth War Zone Li Zongren, and his German advisor Alexander von Falkenhausen. They argued that the Chinese Army needed more time to recover from its losses at Shanghai, and pointed out that Nanjing was highly indefensible topographically. The gently sloping terrain in front of Nanjing would make it easy for the attackers to advance on the city, while the Yangtze River behind Nanjing would cut off the defenders' retreat.

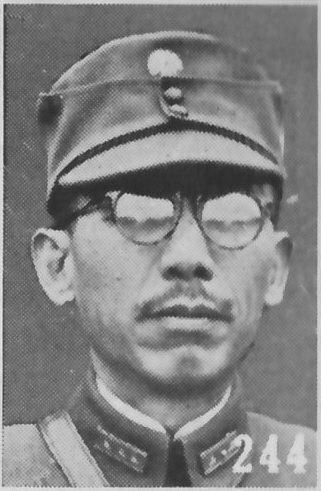
Chinese General Tang Shengzhi

Chiang, however, had become increasingly agitated over the course of the Battle of Shanghai, even angrily declaring that he would stay behind in Nanjing alone and command its defense personally. But just when Chiang believed himself completely isolated, General Tang Shengzhi, an ambitious senior member of the Military Affairs Commission, spoke out in defense of Chiang's position, although accounts vary on whether Tang vociferously jumped to Chiang's aid or only reluctantly did so. Seizing the opportunity Tang had given him, Chiang responded by organizing the Nanjing Garrison Force on November 20 and officially making Tang its commander on November 25. The orders Tang received from Chiang on November 30 were to "defend the established defense lines at any cost and destroy the enemy's besieging force".

Though both men publicly declared that they would defend Nanjing "to the last man", they were aware of their precarious situation. On the same day that the Garrison Force was established Chiang officially moved the capital of China from Nanjing to Chongqing deep in China's interior. Further, both Chiang and Tang would at times give contradictory instructions to their subordinates on whether their mission was to defend Nanjing to the death or merely delay the Japanese advance.

== Prelude ==
=== China's defense preparations ===
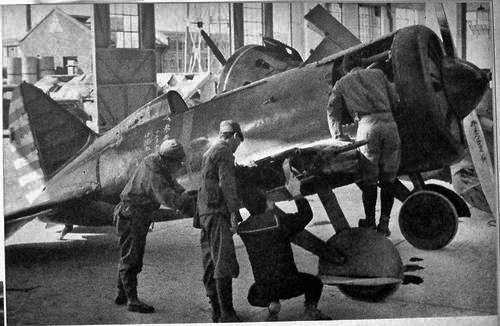
A Soviet-made I-16 fighter in the service of the ROCAF in Nanjing

Following the Manchurian Incident of 1931, the Chinese government began a fast track national defense program with massive construction of primary and auxiliary air force bases around the capital of Nanjing including Jurong Airbase, completed in 1934, from which to facilitate aerial defense as well as launching counter-strikes against enemy incursions; on August 15, 1937, the IJN launched the first of many heavy schnellbomber (fast bomber) raids against Jurong Airbase using the advanced G3Ms based upon Giulio Douhet's blitz-attack concept in an attempt to neutralize the Chinese Air Force fighters guarding the capital city, but was severely repulsed by the unexpected heavy resistance and performance of the Chinese fighter pilots stationed at Jurong, and suffering almost 50% loss rate.

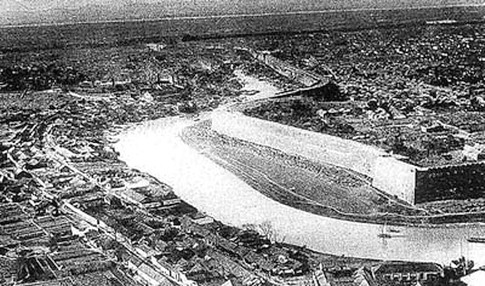
Nanjing's stone city walls as photographed in 1930

On November 20 the Chinese Army and teams of conscripted laborers began to hurriedly bolster Nanjing's defenses both inside and outside the city. Nanjing itself was surrounded by formidable stone walls stretching almost fifty kilometers (31 miles) around the entire city. The walls, which had been constructed hundreds of years earlier during the Ming Dynasty, rose up to twenty meters (66 feet) in height, were nine meters (30 feet) thick, and had been studded with machine gun emplacements. By December 6 all the gates into the city had been closed and then barricaded with an additional layer of sandbags and concrete six meters (20 feet) thick.

Outside the walls a series of semicircular defense lines were constructed in the path of the Japanese advance, most notably an outer one about sixteen kilometers (9.9 miles) from the city and an inner one directly outside the city known as the Fukuo Line, or multiple positions line. The Fukuo Line, a sprawling network of trenches, moats, barbed wire, mine fields, gun emplacements, and pillboxes, was to be the final defense line outside Nanjing's city walls. There were also two key high points of land on the Fukuo Line, the peaks of Zijinshan to the northeast and the plateau of Yuhuatai to the south, where fortification was especially dense. In order to deny the Japanese invaders any shelter or supplies in this area, Tang adopted a strategy of scorched earth on December 7, ordering all homes and structures in the path of the Japanese within one to two kilometers (1.2 miles) of the city to be incinerated, as well as all homes and structures near roadways within sixteen kilometers (9.9 miles) of the city.

=== China's forces ===
The defending army, the Nanjing Garrison Force, was on paper a formidable army of thirteen divisions, including three elite German-trained divisions plus the super-elite Training Brigade. The reality was that nearly all of these units, save for the 2nd Army Group, had been severely mauled from the combat in Shanghai. By the time they reached Nanjing they were physically exhausted, low on equipment, and badly depleted in total troop strength. In order to replenish some of these units, 16,000 young men and teenagers from Nanjing and the rural villages surrounding it were speedily pressed into service as new recruits.

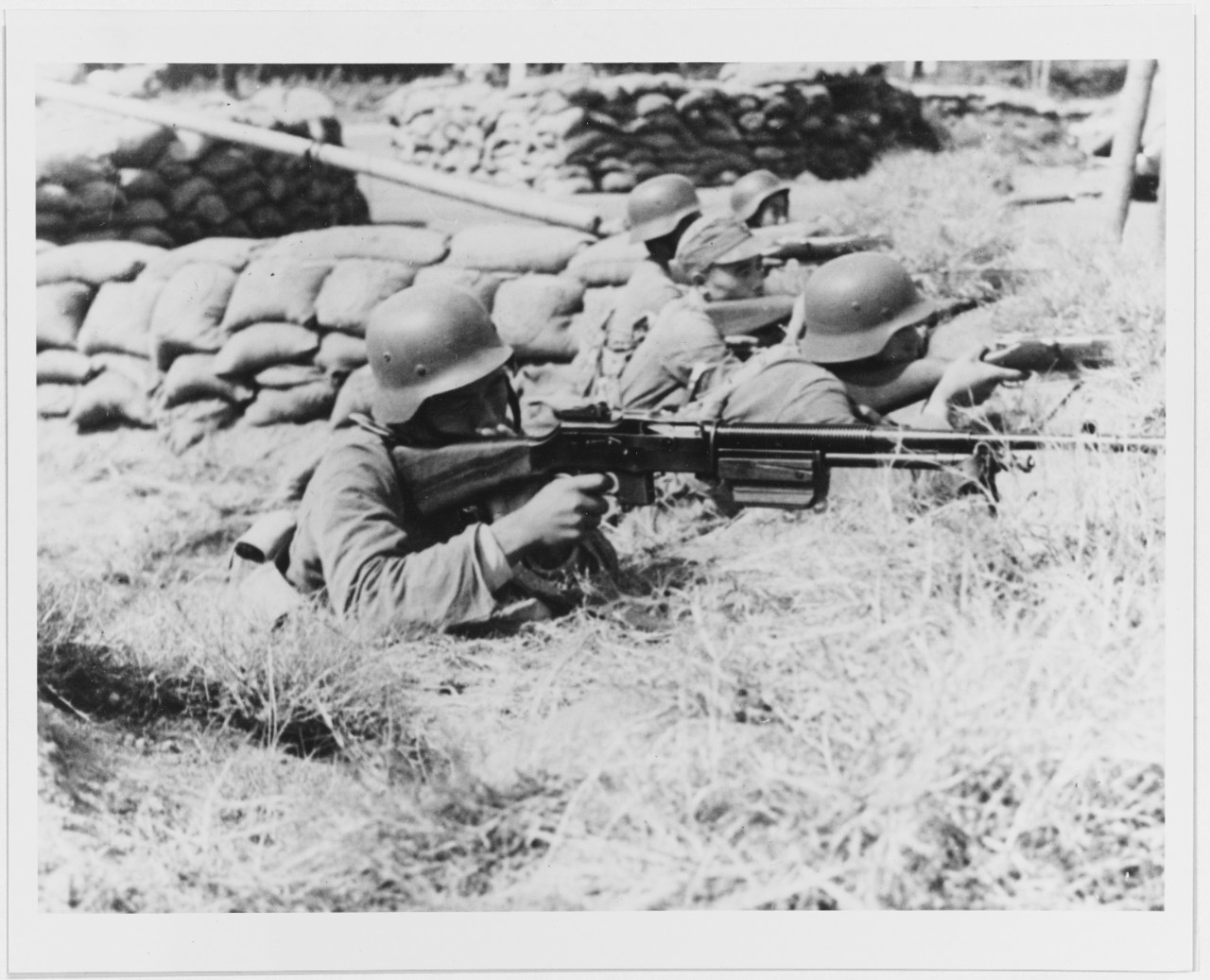
Chinese soldiers from one of the elite German-trained divisions between Nanjing and Shanghai, November 26, 1937. Most wear the M35 Stahlhelm. One wears a German-style ski cap.

The German trained units, the 36th, 87th and 88th Divisions, had each taken heavy casualties in Shanghai and saw their elite quality drop as a result. As of December, each division consisted of between 6,000 and 7,000 troops, of which roughly half were raw recruits. In addition to these units, the defenders of Nanjing and the outside defensive lines were composed of four Guangdong (Cantonese) divisions in the 66th and 83rd Corps, five divisions and two brigades from Sichuan in the 23rd Group Army, and two divisions from the NRA Central Army in the 74th Corps. Additional units were provided in by the Nanjing Gendarmerie and Nanjing Capital Garrison. However, most of these units had also suffered very high losses from the months of fighting in and around Shanghai. The 66th Corps had been reduced to half its original size, and its two divisions had to be reorganized into regiments. To replenish the Chinese garrison, 40,200 men from 44 supplementary battalions, 4 supplementary regiments, and 1 Jiangxi security regiment were sent towards the 36th division, 87th division, 88th division, 51st and 58th divisions of the 74th corps, and the Training Division of the Central Army. An additional 16,000-18,000 fresh soldiers were brought in from Hankou in the ranks of the 2nd Army, with 80% of their strength composed of recent recruits. However, due to the unexpected rapidity of the Japanese advance, most of these new conscripts received only rudimentary training on how to fire their guns on their way to or upon their arrival at the frontlines.

No definitive statistics exist on how many soldiers the Nanjing Garrison Force had managed to cobble together by the time of the battle. Ikuhiko Hata estimates 100,000, and Tokushi Kasahara who argues in favor of about 150,000. The most reliable estimates are those of David Askew, who estimates via a unit-by-unit analysis a strength of 73,790 to 81,500 Chinese defenders in the city of Nanjing itself. These numbers are backed up by the Nanking Garrison staff officer T'an Tao-p'ing, who records a garrison of 81,000 soldiers, a number which Masahiro Yamamoto argues to be one of the most probable figures.

=== Japanese mass bombings ===
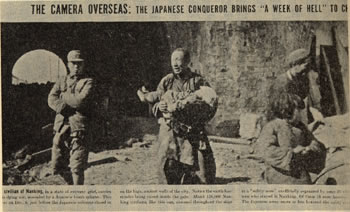
A Chinese civilian carries his dying son wounded in a Japanese air raid on Nanjing.

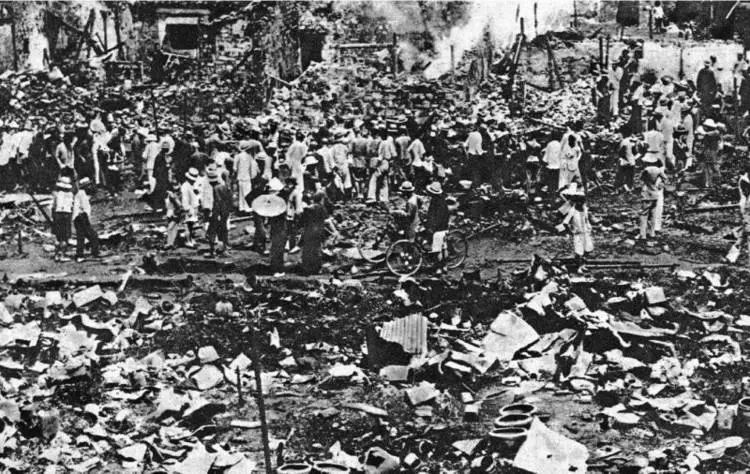
The aftermath of a Japanese bombing raid on Nanjing

Even before the conclusion of the battle of Shanghai, Japan's Navy Air Service was launching frequent air raids on the city, eventually totaling 50 raids according to the Navy's own records. The Imperial Japanese Navy Air Service had struck Nanjing for the first time on August 15 with Mitsubishi G3M medium-heavy bombers, but suffered heavy losses in face of the aerial defense from Chinese Air Force Boeing P-26/281 Peashooter and Hawk II/Hawk III fighters based primarily at Jurong Airbase for the defense of Nanjing. It wasn't until after the introduction of the advanced Mitsubishi A5M fighter did the Japanese begin to turn the tide in air-to-air combat, and proceed with bombing both military and civilian targets day and night with increasing impunity as the Chinese Air Force losses mounted through continuous attrition; the Chinese did not have the aircraft industry nor comprehensive training regimen to replace men and machines to contend against the ever-growing and ever-improving Japanese war machine.

However, experienced fighter pilots of the Chinese Air Force still proved a danger against Japanese air power; combat aces Col. Gao Zhihang, Maj. John Wong Pan-yang and Capt. Liu Cuigang who were outnumbered by the superior A5Ms entering Nanjing on October 12, shot down four A5M fighters that day, including Shotai leader W.O. Torakuma who was downed by Chinese fighter ace Col. Gao. Both Col. Gao and Capt. Liu died in non-aerial combat incidents by the following month as they were preparing to receive improved fighter aircraft design in the Polikarpov I-16s.

=== Evacuation of Nanjing ===
In the face of Japanese terror bombing and the ongoing advance of the Imperial Japanese Army, the large majority of Nanjing's citizens fled the city. By early December Nanjing's population had dropped from its former total of more than one million to less than 500,000, a figure which included Chinese refugees from rural villages burned down by their own government's scorched earth policies. Most of those still in the city were very poor and had nowhere else to go. Foreign residents of Nanjing were also repeatedly asked to leave the city which was becoming more and more chaotic under the strain of bombings, fires, looting by criminals, and electrical outages, but those few foreigners brave enough to stay behind strived to find a way to help the Chinese civilians who had been unable to leave. In late-November a group of them led by German citizen John Rabe established the Nanking Safety Zone in the center of the city, a self-proclaimed demilitarized zone where civilian refugees could congregate in order to hopefully escape the fighting. The safety zone was recognized by the Chinese government, and on December 8 Tang Shengzhi demanded that all civilians evacuate there.

Among those Chinese who did manage to escape Nanjing were Chiang Kai-shek and his wife Soong Mei-ling, who had flown out of Nanjing on a private plane just before the crack of dawn on December 7. The mayor of Nanjing and most of the municipal government left the same day, entrusting management of the city to the Nanjing Garrison Force.

== Japanese advance on Nanjing (November 11 – December 4) ==
By the start of December, Japan's Central China Area Army had swollen in strength to over 160,000 men, though only about 70,000 of these would ultimately participate in the fighting. The plan of attack against Nanjing was a pincer movement which the Japanese called "encirclement and annihilation". The two prongs of the Central China Area Army's pincer were the Shanghai Expeditionary Army (SEA) advancing on Nanjing from its eastern side and the 10th Army advancing from its southern side. To the north and west of Nanjing lay the Yangtze River, but the Japanese planned to plug this possible escape route as well both by dispatching a squadron of ships up the river and by deploying two special detachments to circle around behind the city. The Kunisaki Detachment was to cross the Yangtze in the south with the ultimate aim of occupying Pukou on the river bank west of Nanjing while the Yamada Detachment was to be sent on the far north route with the ultimate aim of taking Mufushan just north of Nanjing.

=== Fighting retreat of the Chinese Army, breaching the Wufu line ===
As of 11 November, all elements of the Chinese army in the Lower Yangtze Theatre were falling back after the Battle of Shanghai. Unlike previous instances during the Shanghai campaign where Chinese retreats were conducted with discipline, the Chinese retreat from Shanghai was poorly coordinated and disorganized, in part due to the sheer size of the operation and lack of prior planning. The orders to retreat had been passed top-down in a haphazard manner, and the Chinese army frequently bogged down under its own weight or became congested at bottlenecks like bridges. Making matters worse were Japanese aircraft constantly harassing the Chinese columns, adding to the growing casualties and mayhem. Despite their losses, the Chinese army managed to escape destruction by the Japanese forces, who were attempting to encircle them in the last few days of the combat in Shanghai.

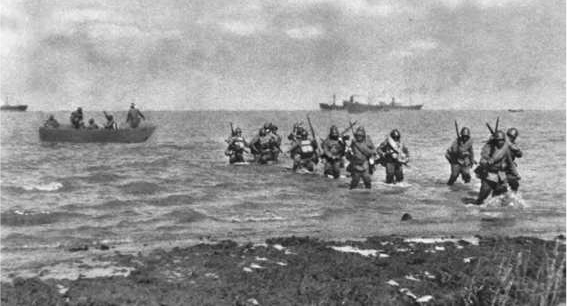
Japanese troops of the 16th Division landing on the South Yangtze near Baimaokou, November 13 or 14

On 12 November, the Japanese forces deployed in Shanghai were ordered to pursue the retreating Chinese forces. With most Chinese troops melting away into the retreat, many cities and towns were quickly captured by the Japanese, including Jiading, Taicang, and Jiashan. Japanese troops from the freshly deployed Tenth Army, consisting of the 6th, 18th, 114th divisions and the Kunisaki Detachment, were eager for combat. However, many of the other Japanese units were exhausted from the fighting in Shanghai, and were slower to follow through with their orders.

Despite the Chinese retreat, the Japanese encountered strong resistance at the Wufu defensive line between Fushan and Lake Tai, which had been nicknamed a "new Hindenburg line" in Chinese propaganda. At Changshu, Japanese forces had to fight slowly through an interlocking system of concrete pillboxes manned by Chinese soldiers fighting to the death, all whilst Chinese artillery bombarded them with accurate fire. The Japanese 9th Division was faced with a similar challenge in Suzhou: contrary to propaganda accounts of the city falling without a fight, Japanese soldiers had to fight through a series of pillboxes in front of the city before painstakingly eliminating pockets of resistance in street fighting. These operations were concluded by 19 November, with some 1,000 Chinese soldiers killed in Suzhou and another 100 artillery pieces captured, according to Japanese records.

By late November, the Japanese army was advancing rapidly around Lake Tai en route to Nanjing. The Chinese, in order to counter these advances, deployed some five divisions of the Sichuanese 23rd Group Army from warlord Liu Xiang's forces to the southern end of the lake near Guangde, and two more divisions (the 103rd and 112th) to the river fortress Jiangyin near the lake's northern end, which had been the site of a naval battle in August.

=== Battles of Lake Tai and Guangde ===
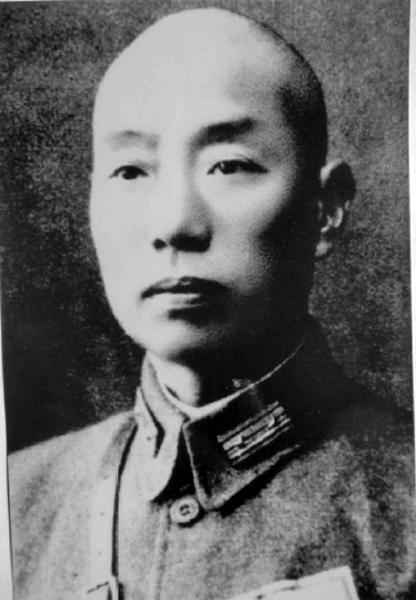
Sichuanese general Rao Guohua, whose forces would defend Guangde. He would commit suicide at the battle's end.

On November 25, the Japanese 18th Division attacked the town of Sian near Guangde. The Chinese defenders, underequipped and inexperienced troops from the 145th Division, were overwhelmed by Japanese airpower and tanks and hastily fell back. A counterattack on Sian from the 146th Division was repelled by Japanese armor.

On the southwestern edge of Lake Tai, the Sichuanese 144th Division from the 23rd Group Army had dug into a position where the local terrain formed a narrow funnel in the local road. When faced with the advance of the Japanese 114th Division, the Chinese ambushed the Japanese with hidden mountain guns, inflicting heavy casualties on the Japanese. However, fearing the loss of their artillery from retaliatory enemy attacks, the Chinese officers withdrew their artillery in the heat of battle. As a result, the Chinese infantry were slowly pushed back, and finally broke into a retreat towards Guangde when Japanese troops flanked their positions on the lake's shores via stolen civilian motor boats.

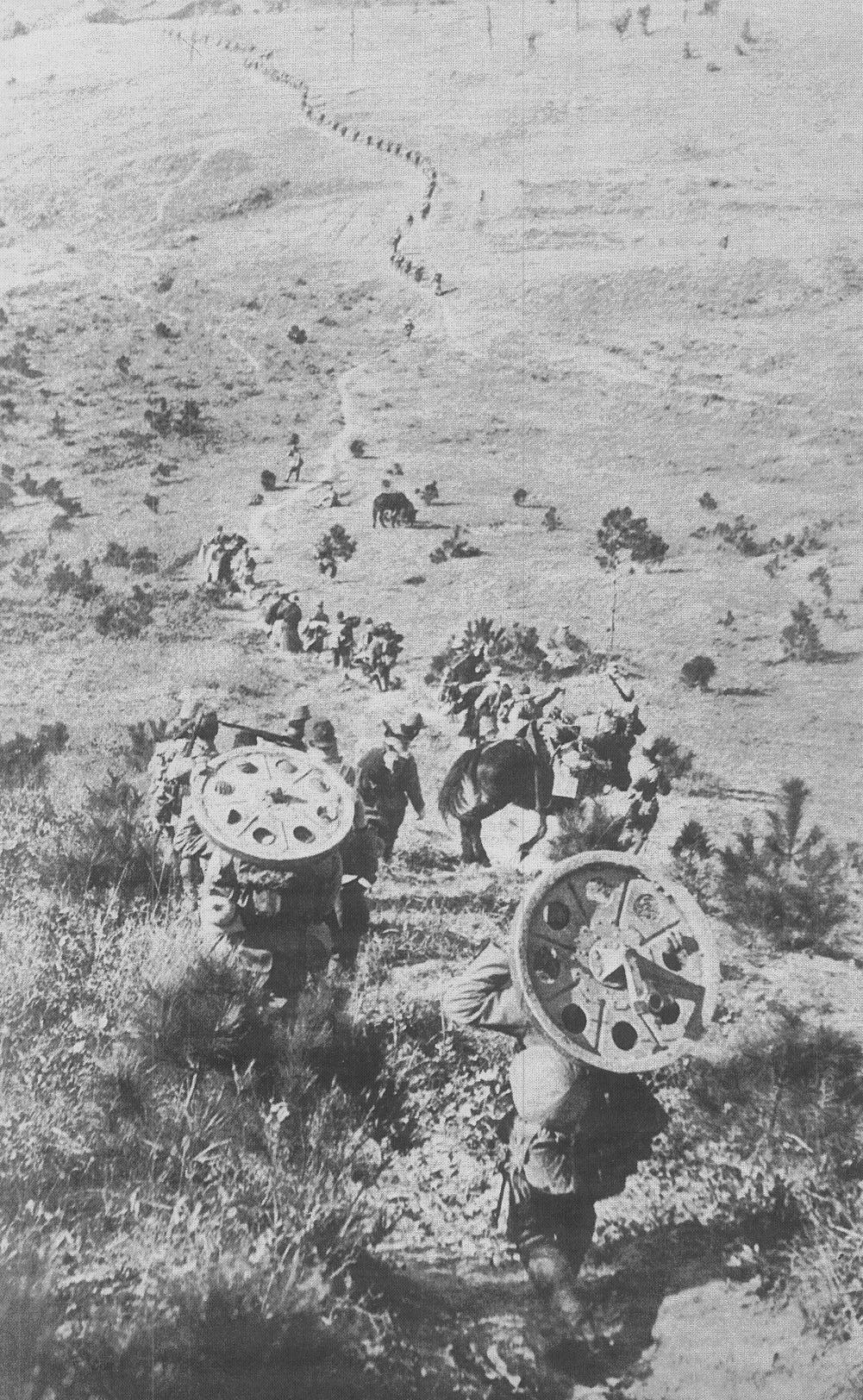
Japanese soldiers marching on Nanjing

The last days of November saw the five Sichuanese divisions fight fiercely in the vicinity of Guangde, but their defense was hindered by divided leadership and a lack of radio communications. The Japanese overwhelmed the Chinese defenders with artillery, and finally forced the 23rd Group Army back on November 30. Sichuanese division commander Rao Guohua, unable to bear the defeat, shot himself the day after the retreat. The 23rd Group Army suffered heavy casualties in this battle, with at least 4,454 killed, wounded, or missing. (Note: The losses of the 147th division and independent 13th and 14th brigades had not been reported.)

=== Battle of Jiangyin ===
On November 29, the Japanese 13th Division attacked the walled town of Jiangyin near the Yangtze River after a two-day artillery bombardment. They were confronted by some 10,000 troops from the Chinese 112th and 103rd Divisions, which were composed of a mix of Manchurian veteran exiles and recruits from Southwestern China, respectively. Despite encountering ambushes and difficult terrain in the form of 33 hills around the city, the Japanese were able to advance under the cover of land and naval artillery from their ships on the Yangtze. Chinese coastal batteries mounted on Jiangyin's walls retaliated against the Japanese ships, causing damage to several Japanese vessels. To even the odds, Chinese raiders organized suicide missions to infiltrate Japanese lines at night and destroy enemy tanks with explosives. The hills around Jiangyin were the site of vicious fighting, with Mount Ding changing hands several times, resulting in Chinese company commander Xia Min'an being killed in action.

The Japanese eventually managed to overcome the Chinese defenses through a combination of artillery, aircraft and tanks. The Chinese began a withdrawal on December 1, but poor communication resulted in the 112th Division leaving too soon, resulting in a chaotic retreat for the 103rd Division. Both divisions had suffered heavy losses in the fighting, and only a portion of their original strength (estimated to be between 1,000 and 2,000 men for the 103rd Division) made it back to Nanjing.

During the rest of their advance, the Japanese overcame resistance from the already battered Chinese forces who were being pursued by the Japanese from Shanghai in a "running battle". Here the Japanese were aided by their complete air supremacy, abundance of tanks, the improvised and hastily constructed nature of the Chinese defenses, and also by the Chinese strategy of concentrating their defending forces on small patches of relatively high ground which made them easy to outflank and surround. Tillman Durdin reported in one case where Japanese troops surrounded some 300 Chinese soldiers from the 83rd Corps on a cone-shaped peak: "The Japanese set a ring of fire around the peak. The fire, feeding on trees and grass, gradually crept nearer and nearer to the top, forcing the Chinese upward until, huddled together, they were mercilessly machine-gunned to death."

=== Japanese atrocities on the way to Nanjing ===
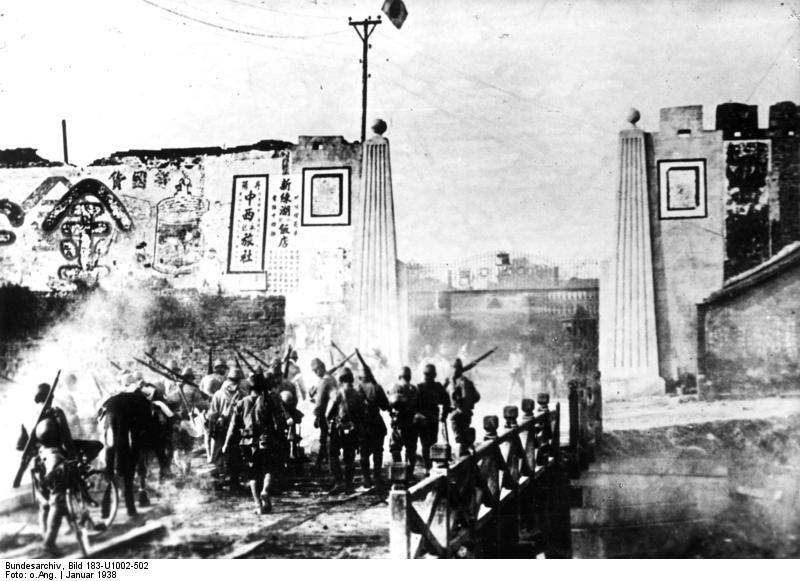
Japanese soldiers enter Danyang, 50 km (30 miles) east of Nanjing

General Matsui, along with the Army General Staff, had originally envisaged making a slow and steady march on Nanjing, but his subordinates disobeyed orders and instead raced each other to the city. The capture of Guangde had occurred three days before the army was even supposed to start its planned advance, and the SEA had captured Danyang on December 2, more than five days ahead of schedule. On average, the Japanese units were advancing on Nanjing at the breakneck pace of up to forty kilometers (25 miles) per day. In order to achieve such speeds, the Japanese soldiers carried little with them except weaponry and ammunition. Because they were marching well ahead of most of their supply lines, Japanese troops usually looted from Chinese civilians along the way, which was almost always accompanied by extreme violence. As a Japanese journalist in the 10th Army recorded, "The reason that the [10th Army] is advancing to Nanjing quite rapidly is due to the tacit consent among the officers and men that they could loot and rape as they wish."

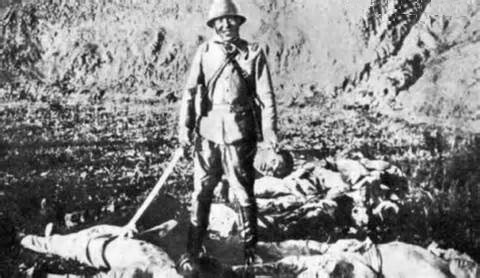
Japanese soldier posing with a severed head

The Japanese advance on Nanjing was marked by a trail of arson, rape and murder. The 170 miles between Shanghai and Nanjing were left "a nightmarish zone of death and destruction." Japanese planes strafed unarmed farmers and refugees "for fun". Civilians were subjected to extreme violence and brutality in a foreshadowing of the Nanjing Massacre. For example, the Nanqiantou hamlet was set on fire, with many of its inhabitants locked within the burning houses. Two women, one of them pregnant, were raped repeatedly. Afterwards, the soldiers "cut open the belly of the pregnant woman and gouged out the fetus." A crying two-year-old boy was wrestled from his mother's arms and thrown into the flames, while the hysterically sobbing mother and remaining villagers were bayoneted, disemboweled, and thrown into a nearby creek. Many Chinese civilians committed suicide, such as two girls who deliberately drowned themselves near Pinghu.

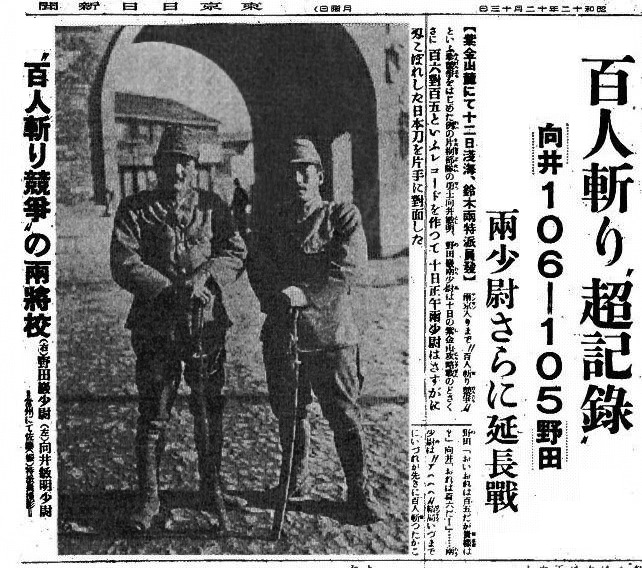
A Japanese newspaper reporting on the hundred man killing contest

Many cities and towns were subject to destruction and looting by the advancing Japanese, including but not limited to Suzhou, Taicang and Jiading. When massacring villages, Japanese forces usually executed the men immediately, while the women and children were raped and tortured first before being murdered. One atrocity of note was the killing contest between two Japanese officers, where both men held a competition to see who could behead 100 Chinese captives the first. The atrocity was conducted twice with the second round raising the goal to 150 captives, and was reported on by Japanese newspapers.

In a continuation of their practices from Shanghai, the Japanese troops executed all Chinese soldiers they captured on their way to Nanjing. Prisoners of war were shot, beheaded, bayonetted and burned to death. In addition, since thousands of Chinese soldiers had dispersed into the countryside, the Japanese implemented "mopping-up operations" in the countryside to deny the Chinese shelter, where all buildings without any immediate value to the Japanese army were burned down, and their inhabitants slaughtered.

== Battle for Nanjing's outer line of defense (December 5–9) ==
=== Battles of Chunhua and the Two Peaks ===
On December 5, Chiang Kai-shek paid a visit to a defensive encampment near Jurong to boost the morale of his men but was forced to leave when the Imperial Japanese Army began their attack on the battlefield. On that day the rapidly moving forward contingents of the SEA occupied Jurong and then arrived near Chunhua(zhen), a town 15 miles southeast of Nanjing and a key point of the capital's outer line of defense which would put Japanese artillery in range of the city. Chunhua was defended by China's 51st Division of the 74th Corps, veterans of the fighting from Shanghai. Despite facing difficulties in using the fortifications around the town due to a lack of keys, the 51st Division had managed to establish a three-line defense with pillboxes, hidden machine gun nests, two rows of barbed wire and an anti-tank ditch.

Battle had already begun on 4 December, when 500 soldiers from the Japanese 9th division attacked Chinese forward positions in Shuhu, a small town several miles away from Chunhua. The Chinese company in Shuhu held out for two days, and at one point deployed a tank platoon against the Japanese infantry, losing 3 armored vehicles in exchange for 40 Japanese casualties. By 6 December, the defenders abandoned their positions, and some 30 survivors fought their way out of Shuhu.

The Japanese pushed to Chunhua, but were faced with heavy resistance by the 51st Division, who inflicted heavy casualties on the Japanese in preplanned kill zones with machine guns and artillery attacks. Nevertheless, Japanese artillery strikes enabled their infantry to capture the first defensive line, while a well-timed attack by six Japanese bombers enabled a deeper breakthrough. The Japanese left flank managed to penetrate behind Chunhua on December 7, but the final breakthrough came on December 8 when an entire regiment of the 9th Division that had lagged behind entered the fray. The Chinese defenders, who had endured incessant shelling for days and suffered more than 1,500 casualties, finally cracked under the renewed Japanese assault and withdrew. In the five-day battle at Chunhua Town, the 51st division suffered more than 2000 casualties including 2 regiment commanders and 4 battalion commanders.

The SEA also took the fortress at Zhenjiang and the spa town of Tangshuizhen the same day. Meanwhile, on the south side of the same defense line, armored vehicles of Japan's 10th Army charged the Chinese positions at Jiangjunshan (General's Peak) and Niushoushan (Ox Head Peak) defended by China's 58th Division of the 74th Corps. The Chinese defenders had dug in on the high ground, and possessed mountain guns powerful enough to destroy Japanese armor. Multiple Japanese tanks were destroyed, and in some cases, valiant Chinese soldiers armed with hammers jumped onto the vehicles and banged repeatedly on their roofs shouting "Get out of there!" Gradually, through its coordinated use of armor, artillery and infantry, the Japanese managed to slowly dislodge the Chinese defenders. On December 9, after darkness fell on the battlefield, the 58th Division was finally overwhelmed and withdrew, having suffered, according to its own records, 800 casualties. By this point, the 58th division had suffered more than 1,700 casualties including 2 regimental adjutants and 5 battalion commanders.

=== Defensive stand of the 2nd Army and the Battle for Old Tiger's Cave ===
On December 6, the Japanese 16th Division attacked Chinese positions 14 miles east of Nanjing. The Chinese defenders were composed of fresh troops from the 2nd Army, and had dug in onto a ridgeline to meet the Japanese assault. Japanese aircraft and artillery shelled the Chinese defenses relentlessly, inflicting extensive damage and confusion. The Chinese defenders were also hampered by their own inexperience, with some soldiers forgetting to ignite the fuses of their hand grenades before throwing them. Only a cadre of experienced officers and NCO's prevented a total collapse, and enabled the 2nd Army to hold an organized defense for three days until December 9, when they were forced back to Qixia. The fighting had resulted in 3,919 killed and 1,099 wounded for the two divisions of the 2nd Army, an almost four-to-one death-injury ratio. Additionally, the special service company of the 2nd Army suffered 47 killed and 13 wounded.

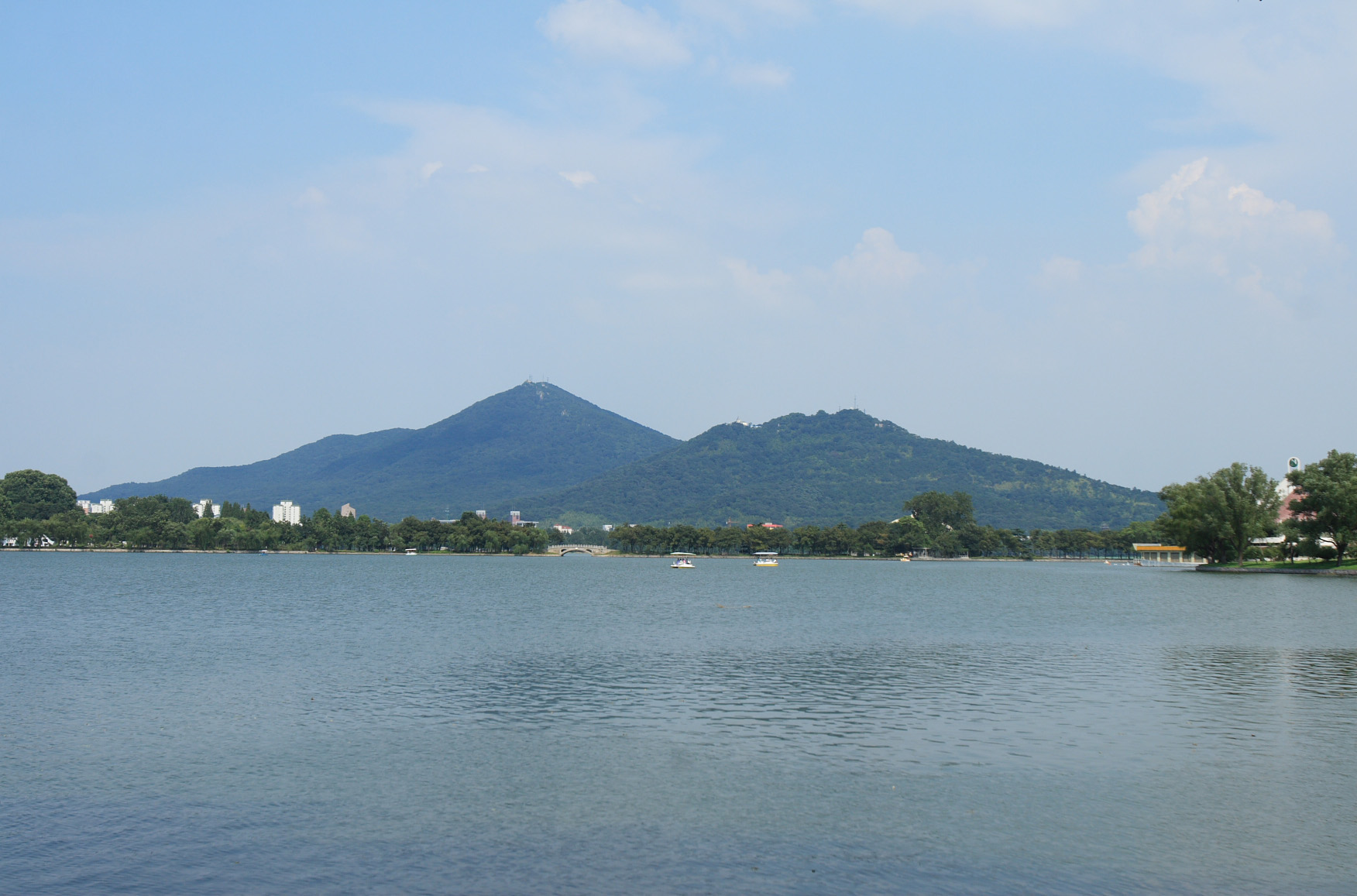
The peaks of Purple Mountain, where the Training Division made its stand

Meanwhile, the 16th division had also begun probing Chinese positions around Purple Mountain, which was manned by China's elite Training Brigade. The Japanese first attacked the Old Tiger's Cave on a hill east of Purple Mountain, which was defended by the Training Brigade's 5th Regiment. After shelling the peak on December 8, Japanese infantry attacked up the hill's slopes, but were cut down by accurate and concentrated fire. On December 9, the Japanese attacked again using smokescreens and air bombardment, but the assault was stopped again when a neighboring Chinese unit counterattacked on the Japanese right flank. However, the 5th Regiment had also suffered heavy casualties in the fighting, losing more than half their men including their commander. In addition, the hill was very exposed and hard to resupply, so the Training Brigade ultimately abandoned the Old Man's Cave and retreated to better positions on the Purple Mountain itself.

By December 9, Japan's forces had reached Nanjing's last line of defense, the daunting Fukuo Line. The stage was set for the final stage of the campaign: the battle for Nanjing itself.

== Final battle for Nanjing City (December 9–13) ==
=== Opening shots ===
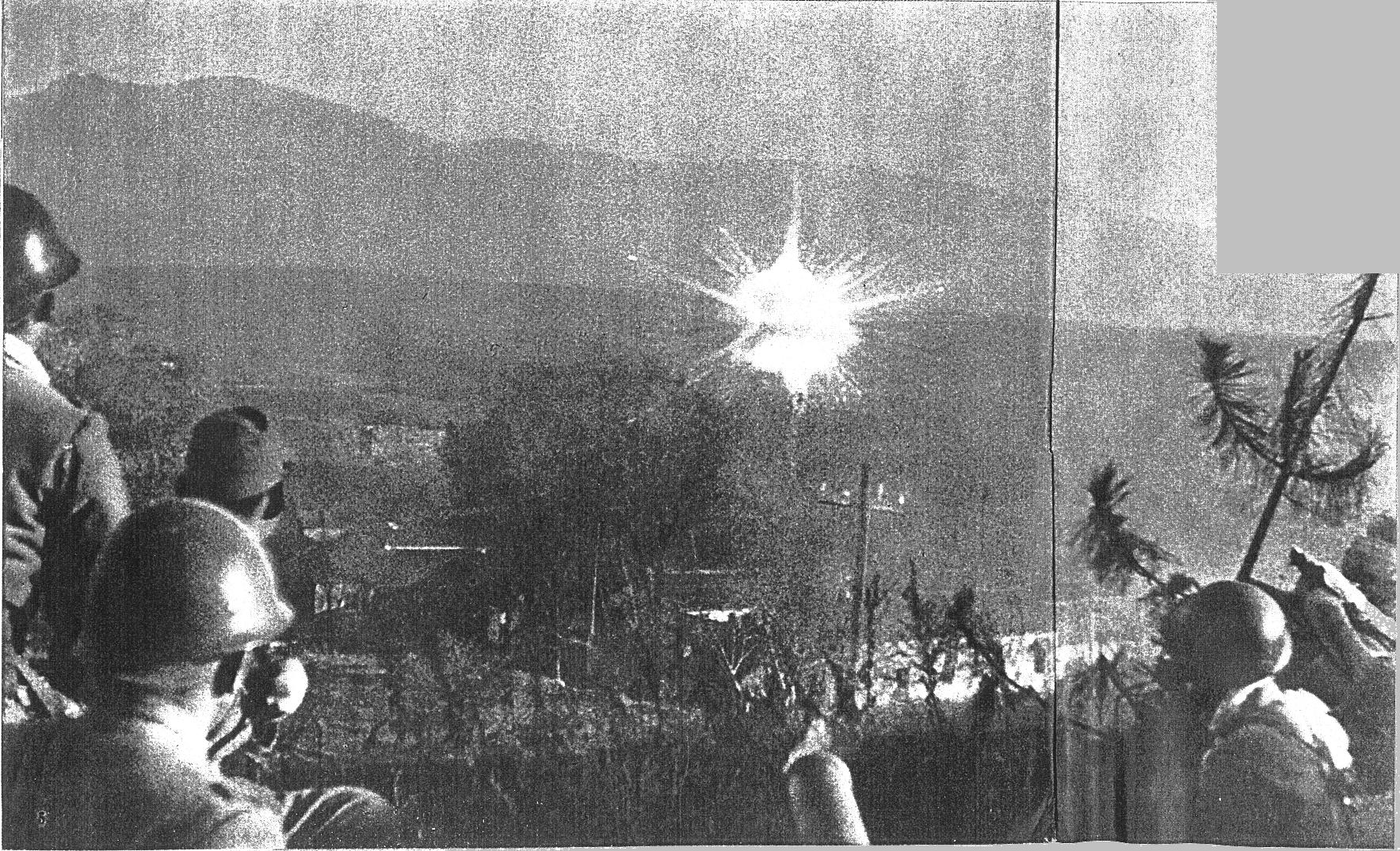
Japanese artillery shelling Guanghua gate

In the dawn of December 9, Japanese soldiers from the 36th Infantry Regiment engaged a battalion of the elite Training Division outside the Nanjing city wall near the Guanghua gate (Gate of Enlightenment). The Chinese withdrew into the wall after half had become casualties. When the Japanese attempted to follow, the Chinese exposed their positions with electrical lights and attacked with small-arms fire, forcing the Japanese back.

The Japanese then wheeled up two mountain guns and began shelling the gate, while Japanese aircraft launched several raids in the area, resulting in over 100 Chinese casualties. The Chinese reinforced the gate with troops from the Nanjing Gendarmerie Military Police and a battalion from the elite 88th Division, the latter of which suffered some 300 casualties in further fighting. The Japanese sent engineers to blow holes in the gate, but after three attempts failed to inflict significant damage. Additional Japanese soldiers rushed the gate in support, but most were cut down by Chinese gunfire. At one point, several Chinese defenders launched a raid to burn down a flour mill outside the wall to deny the Japanese an observation point, which they succeeded in accomplishing. Chinese stragglers outside the city wall also attacked the Japanese in the rear, targeting and killing several messengers in the Japanese communication network. By nightfall, the first battle had ended with a stalemate between both sides.

=== Japanese requests for a Chinese surrender ===
At this point General Matsui had a "summons to surrender" drawn up which requested the Chinese to send military envoys to Nanjing's Zhongshan Gate to discuss terms for the peaceful occupation of the city, and he then had a Mitsubishi Ki-21 scatter thousands of copies of the message over the city. On December 10 a group of Matsui's senior staff officers waited to see if the gate would be opened, but Tang Shengzhi had no intention of responding.

Later that day Tang proclaimed to his men that, "Our army has entered into the final battle to defend Nanjing on the Fukuo Line. Each unit shall firmly defend its post with the resolve to either live or die with it. You're not allowed to retreat on your own, causing defense to collapse." To enforce his orders, Tang deployed the elite 36th division near the Xiaguan docks to ward off any retreat attempts across the Yangtze River, and sent many of the larger vessels away to Hankou. The American journalist F. Tillman Durdin, who was reporting on site during the battle, saw one small group of Chinese soldiers set up a barricade, assemble in a solemn semicircle, and promise each other that they would die together where they stood.

The battle of Nanjing from Frank Capra's The Battle of China

=== Assault on Nanjing ===
At 1:00 pm on December 10, General Matsui ordered all units to launch a full-scale attack on Nanjing. The 16th division immediately assaulted China's super-elite Training Brigade on the peaks of Purple Mountain (Zijinshan), which dominate Nanjing's northeast horizon. Clambering up the ridges of the mountain, the men of the SEA had to painstakingly wrest control of each Chinese encampment one by one in bloody infantry charges. Advancing along the south side of Zijinshan was no easier as General Matsui had forbidden his men from using artillery there due to his deep conviction that no damage should come to its two famous historical sites, Sun Yat-sen Mausoleum and Ming Xiaoling Mausoleum.

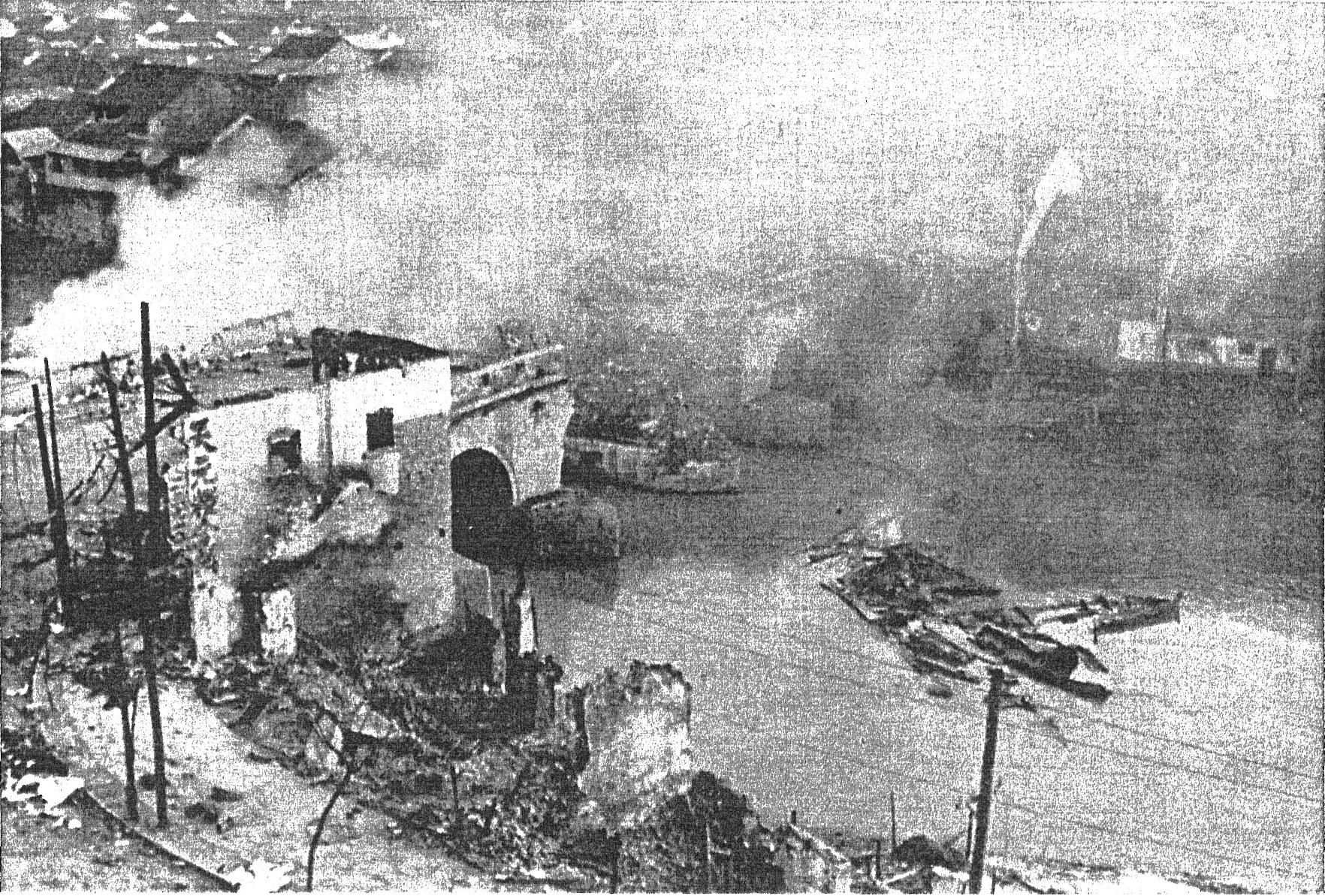
A bridge across the Nanjing city moat destroyed by artillery fire

Also on Nanjing's eastern side but further south, other units of the SEA faced the difficult task of fording the large moat standing between them and three of the city gates, Zhongshan Gate, Guanghua Gate, and Tongji Gate, though the speed of Japan's earlier advance played in their favor as key Chinese units slated to be deployed here were not yet in position.

=== Attacking the Gate of Enlightenment ===
That evening, Japanese engineers and artillerymen closing in on Guanghua Gate managed to blow a hole in the wall. Two Japanese companies of the 36th Regiment immediately launched a daring attack through the gap and planted a Japanese flag on a portion of the gate, but were immediately pinned down by a series of determined Chinese counterattacks.

The Chinese brought up reinforcements from the 83rd Corps and the elite 87th Division, including artillery, tanks and armored cars. The Chinese attacked the Japanese foothold with a pincer movement, inflicting serious losses on the Japanese, who deployed a third company to reinforce their bridgehead. Chinese soldiers atop the city wall attacked the Japanese from above, hurling down hand grenades and even flaming, gasoline-soaked lumber onto the Japanese defenders, which was only saved from annihilation by timely bursts of concentrated artillery fire from the rest of their division. One of the companies had lost eighty of its eighty-eight men as well as its leader, battalion commander Major Ito. The Chinese for their part had lost several officers and over 30 men killed in its counterattacks.

=== The 88th Division at Yuhuatai Plateau and Zhonghua Gate ===
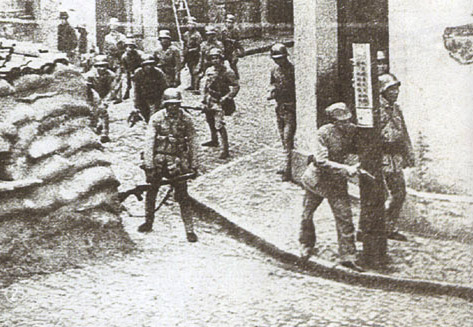
Troops of the 88th Division, who were tasked with defending Yuhuatai and Zhonghua Gate. Most would be killed in the battle.

At the same time, the Japanese 6th Division was storming Yuhuatai, a rugged plateau situated directly in front of Zhonghua Gate on Nanjing's southern side. The 6th division's progress was slow and casualties were heavy, as Yuhuatai was built like a fortress of interlocking fortifications and trenches, fortified with dense tangles of barbed wire, antitank ditches and concrete pillboxes. Making matters worse was the presence of the German-trained 88th Division, who were apt to counterattack, forcing some Japanese units to spend more time defending than attacking. The Chinese defenders, recognizing the importance of Yuhaitai, had deployed the 527th and 528th Regiment, providing tactical artillery support with two artillery companies. Behind Yuhuatai was Nanjing's Zhonghua Gate, which the 88th Division had stationed its barely trained new recruits atop.

The Japanese attacked the 88th division on December 10, but suffered heavy casualties, as they had to fight through hilly terrain covered in barbed wire barricades and tactically placed machine gun nests. Chinese defenders often fought to the last man, with Japanese soldiers noticing that many Chinese pillboxes had been chained from the outside to prevent their occupants from fleeing. The Japanese also encountered problems with advancing too fast at times and bypassing surviving Chinese soldiers, who would then open fire into their flanks and rear. The 88th division also encountered many difficulties for their part, as half of those fighting in the division's ranks were raw recruits, and nearly all of its trained officer corps had been wiped out from the fighting in Shanghai. Furthermore, Chinese artillery crews were reluctant to provide effective artillery support, citing a fear of exposing their positions to return fire.

On December 11, the Japanese, frustrated by the lack of progress near the Gate of Enlightenment, attacked the Zhonghua Gate. Japanese aircraft routed Chinese forces in front of the gate, forcing them inside with the Japanese on their heels. When some 300 Japanese soldiers managed to breach the wall, the Chinese mobilized all available forces and forced them out. By the end of the night, the 88th Division had been forced to fall back in front of the city wall, with many of its surviving troops suffering from severe fatigue. The Japanese made an attempt to infiltrate a "suicide squadron" bearing explosive picric acid up to the Zhonghua Gate to blow a hole in it, but it got lost in the morning fog and failed to reach the wall.

On the morning of December 12, the Japanese began to bombard Zhonghua Gate with field artillery and tank fire. Chinese troops who remained posted outside the gate attempted to retreat back inside the city wall, but almost all were killed before they could make it. By noon, Yuhuatai had been overrun and virtually every man of the 88th division defending it had been killed, including three of their four regimental commanders and both of their brigade commanders, but in the process the Japanese had suffered heavy casualties of their own, some 2,240 losses including 566 dead according to their own records.

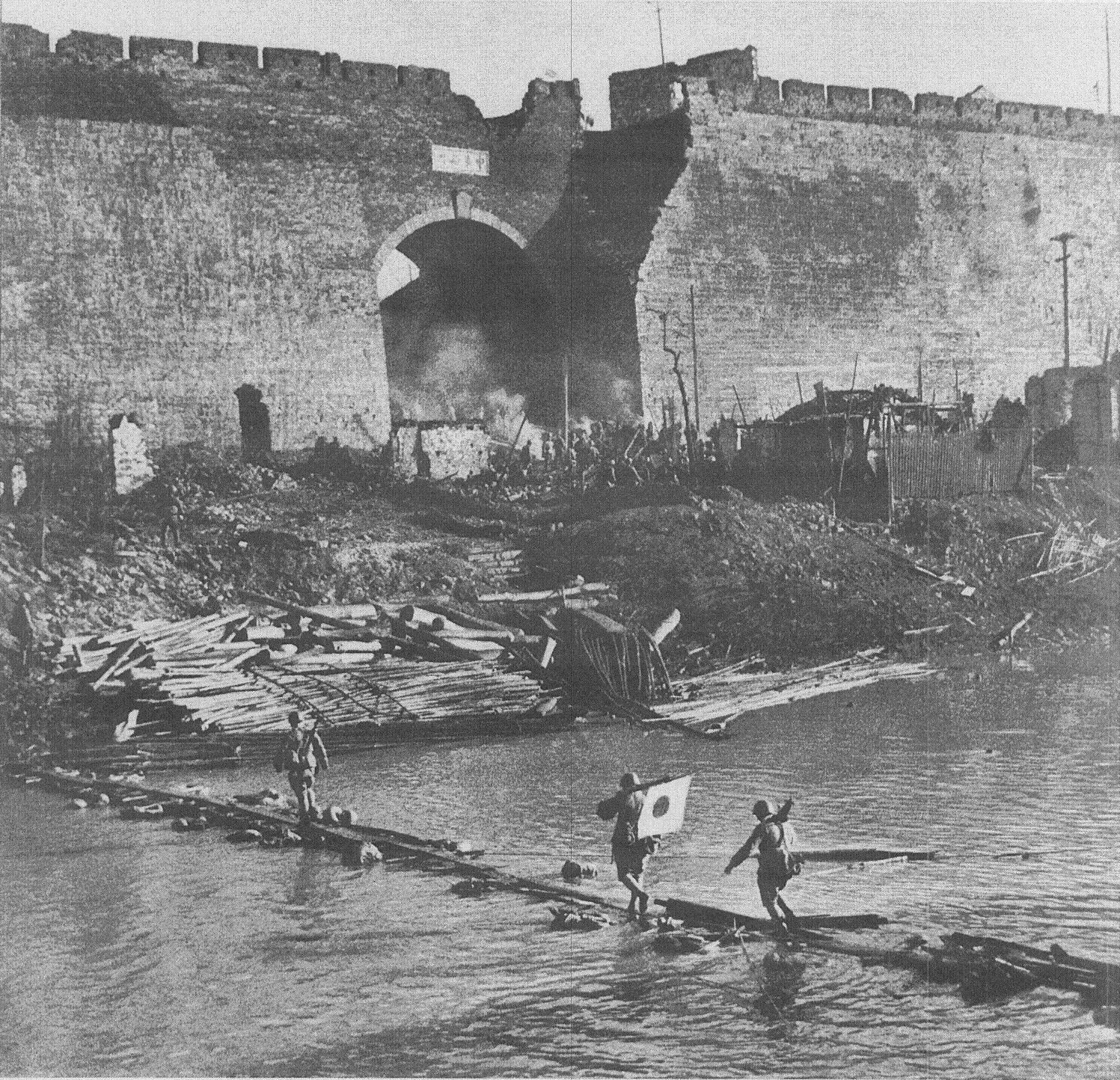
Japanese soldiers crossing the moat close to Zhonghua Gate

At noon on December 12 a squad of six Japanese soldiers made it across the moat in a small boat, and attempted to scale the wall at Zhonghua Gate with a bamboo ladder, but were killed by machine gun fire before they reached the wall.

=== Breaching the Nanjing city wall ===
Back at Guanghua Gate, the Japanese attempted to relieve their beleaguered comrades trapped inside, and after two attempts managed to link up with their forces inside. What followed was an artillery duel between both sides, which lasted the entirety of December 12. During the duel, a stray shell severed the telephone line of the Chinese 87th Division, severing their communications to the rear.

Burdened with the fog of war, the commanders of the 87th Division were alarmed upon noticing their comrades in the Guangdong 83rd Corps abandoning their positions, but did not immediately retreat due to their prior orders and because Nanjing had become considered a home amongst many soldiers in the division. After some deliberation through the night, the 87th Division, having already suffered 3,000 casualties, abandoned their positions on the Gate of Enlightenment at 2am on December 13 to retreat to the Xiaguan wharfs, leaving some 400 of the most severely wounded who could not walk behind in the city.

The Japanese, having noticed the diminishing Chinese resistance, scaled the city gate at around 4am and found it almost deserted. They killed whatever few Chinese soldiers remained in the area and raised the Rising Sun flag to cheers of "Banzai!" Per its own records, the 36th Regiment had suffered some 257 or 275 killed and 546 wounded in the battle of Nanjing, with most of the casualties being from the battle of Chunhua Town and the battle of Guanghua Gate.

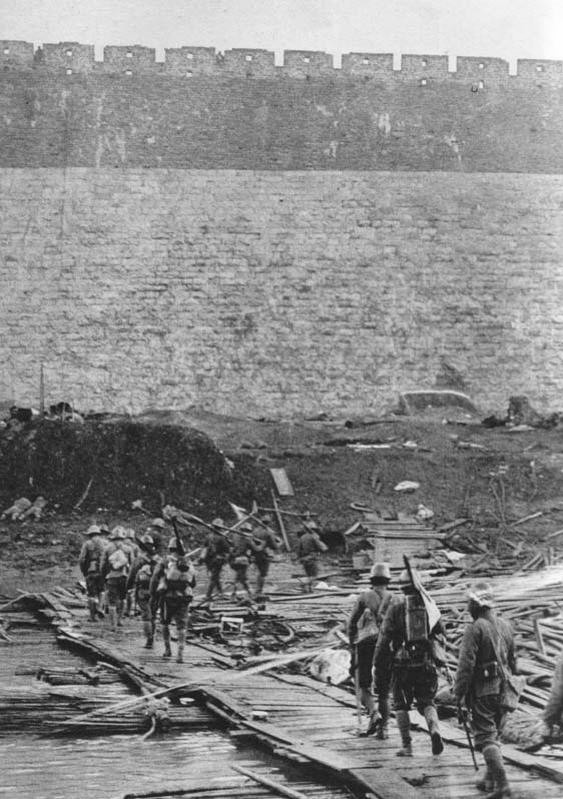
Japanese soldiers cross a moat beneath the Nanjing City Wall

Back near Zhonghua Gate, two Japanese regiments had become pinned down by Chinese gunfire and mortars atop the gate. To conceal their movements, a Japanese team set a fire in front of the gate to create a smokescreen, and by 5:00 pm more and more Japanese troops were crossing the moat and swarming Zhonghua Gate by fording makeshift bridges so rickety their engineers had to hold them aloft with their own bodies. Japanese artillery suppressed the Chinese defenders from atop the Yuhaitai heights, and fired so many rounds into the city wall that part of it finally crumbled. The Japanese seized the gate through this opening, and with artillery support beat back all Chinese counterattacks, securing the Zhonghua Gate by nightfall. Meanwhile, just west of Zhonghua Gate, other soldiers also of Japan's 10th Army had punched a hole through Chinese lines in the wetlands south of Shuixi Gate and were launching a violent drive on that gate with the support of a fleet of tanks.

At the height of the battle, Tang Shengzhi complained to Chiang that, "Our casualties are naturally heavy and we are fighting against metal with merely flesh and blood", but what the Chinese lacked in equipment they made up for in the sheer ferocity with which they fought, partially due to strict orders that no man or unit was to retreat one step without permission. Over the course of the battle, roughly 1,000 Chinese soldiers were shot dead by other members of their own army for attempting to retreat.

=== Attacks on the USS Panay and British vessels ===
In the morning of December 12, the American gunboat USS Panay was escorting three Standard Oil river tankers on the Yangtze River away from the battle zone. The ship was clearly marked by two large American flags painted on canvas awnings, as well as another cloth flag flying from the bow.

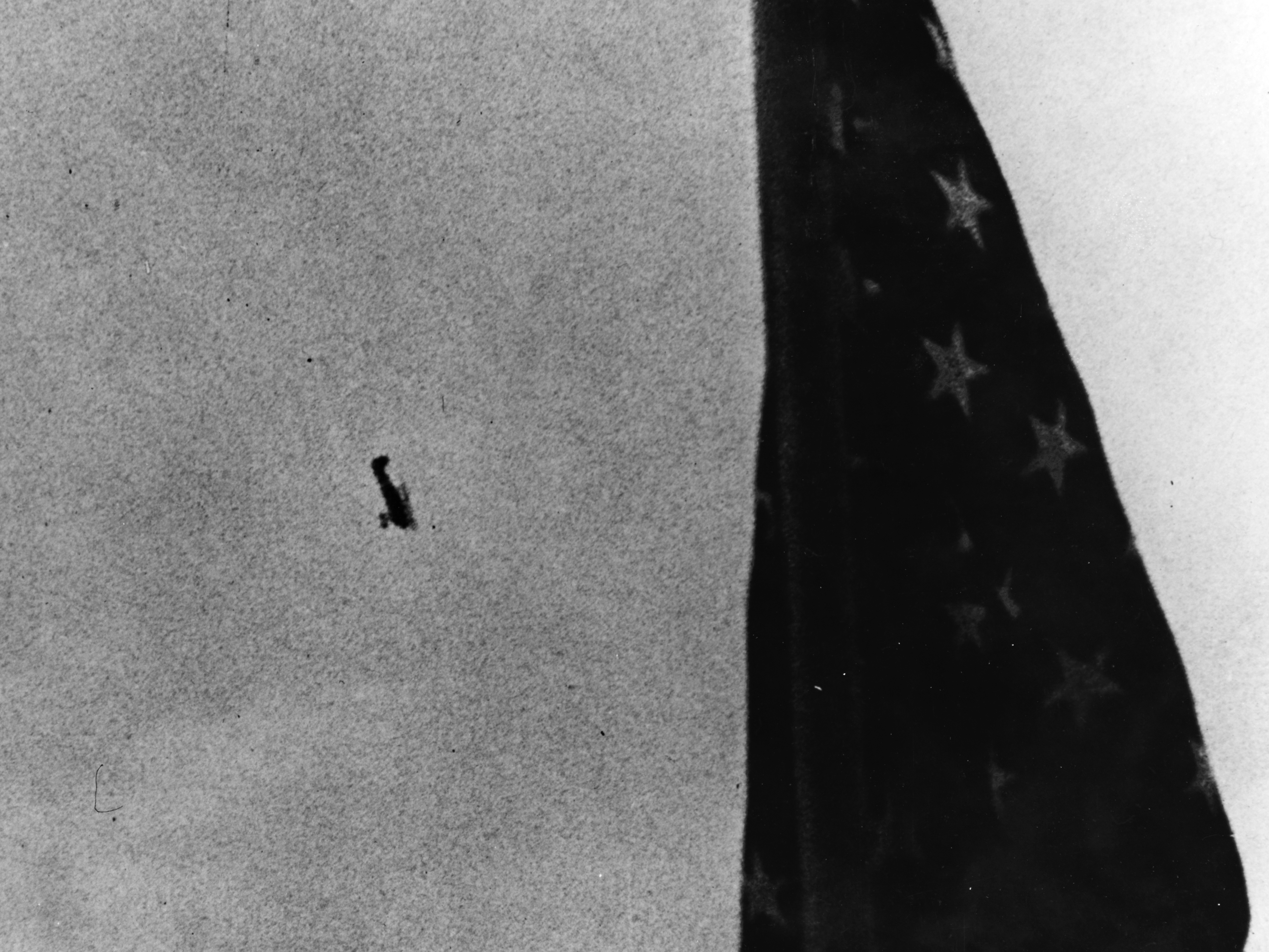
Japanese aircraft attack the Panay, filmed by cameramen Norman Alley and Eric Mayell

The Panay was about twenty-eight miles upstream from Nanjing when Japanese naval aircraft led by Lt. Shigeharu Murata (who would later lead torpedo bomber squadrons against Pearl Harbor) attacked and bombed the gunboat. The first bomb hit disabled the Panay's forward gun and snapped its foremast. Several A4Ns also machine-gunned the ship. After twenty minutes of continuous bombing and strafing, the Panay had caught fire and was listing to starboard, having been crippled by two bomb hits. The three other river tankers had been beached on the riverbanks.

The crew and civilians aboard the Panay, the vast majority of them injured in the attack, evacuated the sinking ship in two boats. Two newsreel cameramen on board the Panay were able to film parts of the attack, at one point capturing footage of Japanese aircraft passing so close to the ship that the pilots' faces were visible.

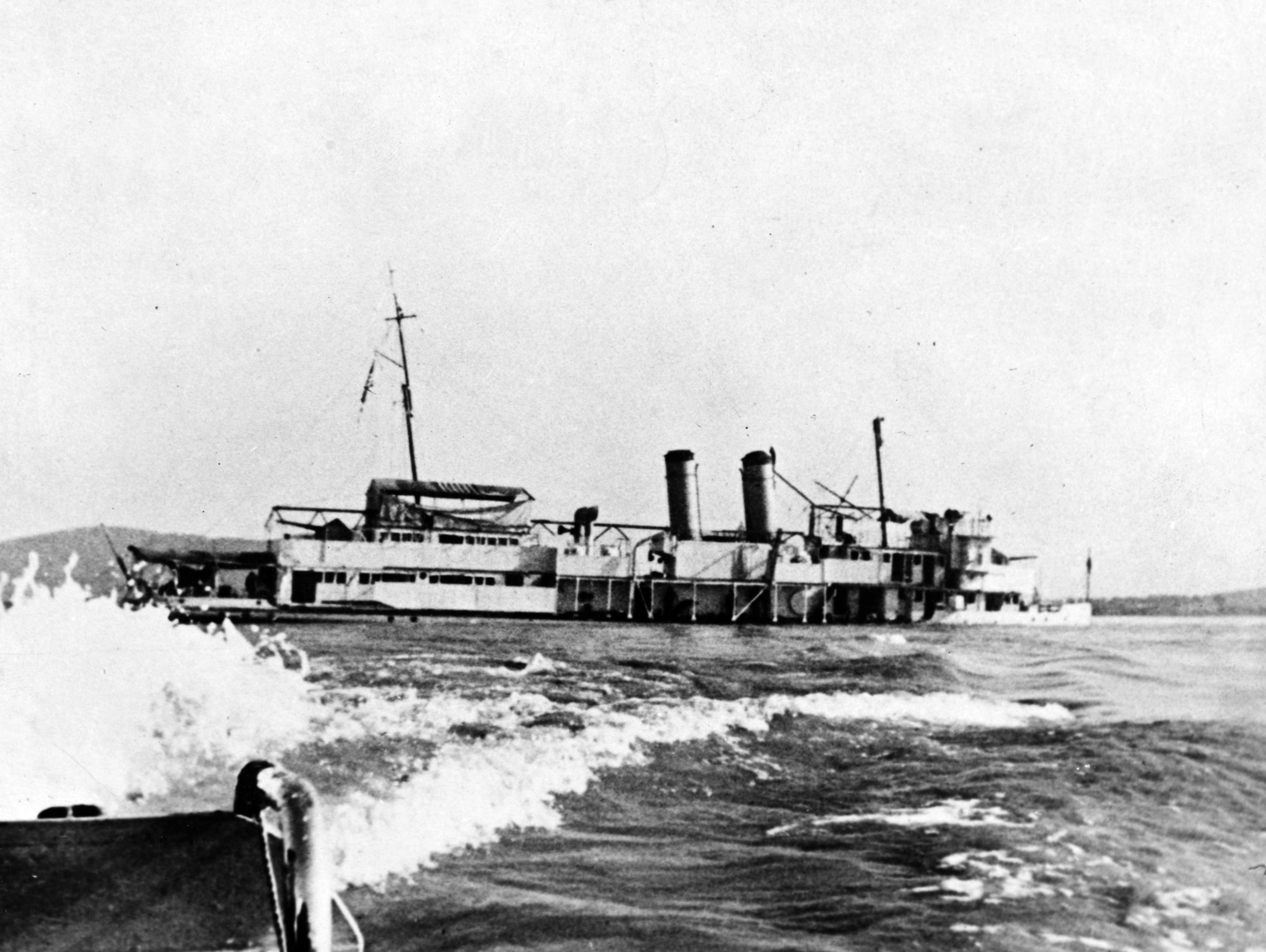
The USS Panay sinking beneath the Yangtze

The crew and passengers hid in the reeds of a nearby island, and witnessed a passing Japanese motorboat machine-gun the sinking ship and board it briefly before departing; the American flag had still been flying from the bow at that time. At 3:54pm, the Panay rolled over to starboard and sank. The survivors then made their way to a nearby village, where some of the injured succumbed to their wounds. Two crewmen and a civilian had been killed in the attack, and another forty-three crew and five civilians wounded.

In addition, the Panay's three consorts, the Standard Oil Company river tankers Mei Ping, Mei Hsia, and Mei An, had also been struck and severely damaged. The trio of ships had been evacuating about eight hundred Chinese employees of Standard Oil and their families on board, and presumably suffered high losses during the Japanese raid.

The pilots responsible for the Panay attack would also bomb the British vessel SS Wantung later that same day.

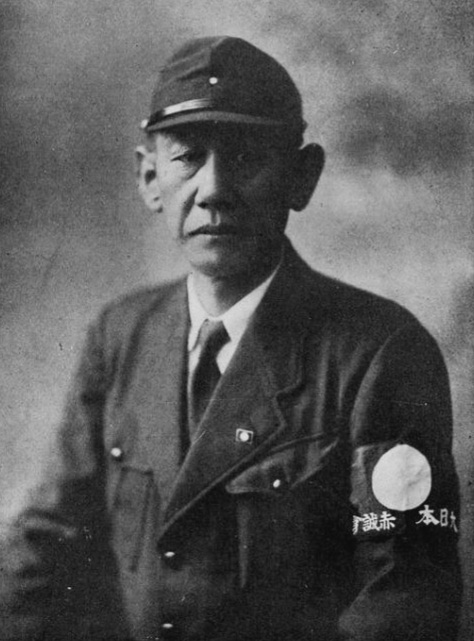
Japanese officer Kingoro Hashimoto, who ordered troops under his command to fire on the Panay and several British vessels

An Imperial Army officer in the vicinity, Col. Kingoro Hashimoto, a founder of one of the right-wing secret societies in Japan, also ordered firing on the Panay as it was sinking, in addition to several British vessels whose identities he knew, including the SS Scarab and HMS Cricket.

Upon receiving complaints that the vessels had clearly displayed the British flag, Hashimoto replied "I do not recognize any flag but my own." Hashimoto also issued orders for his troops and artillery to fire on all ships on the Yangtze "regardless of nationality."

=== Collapse of the Nanjing Garrison Force ===
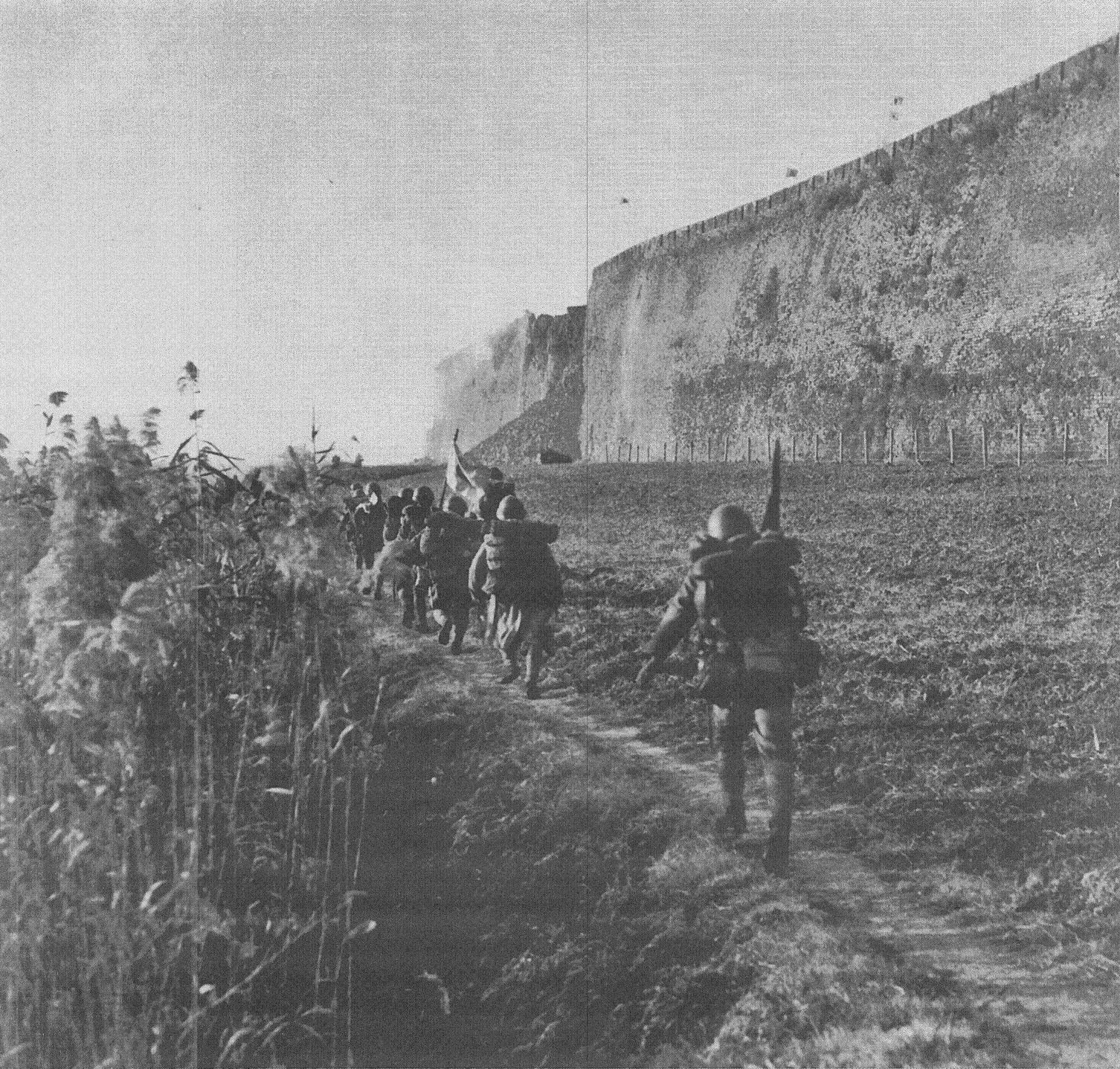
Japanese troops rushing the newly blasted hole in the Nanjing wall near Zhongshan Gate

Back in Nanjing, the Japanese had gained the upper hand over the hard-pressed and surrounded Chinese defenders. On December 12 the 16th division captured the second peak of Zijinshan, and from this vantage point unleashed a torrent of artillery fire at Zhongshan Gate where a large portion of the wall suddenly gave way. After sunset, the fires that blazed out of control on Zijinshan were visible even from Zhonghua Gate in the south, which had been completely occupied by Japan's 6th and 114th division on the night of December 12 to 13.

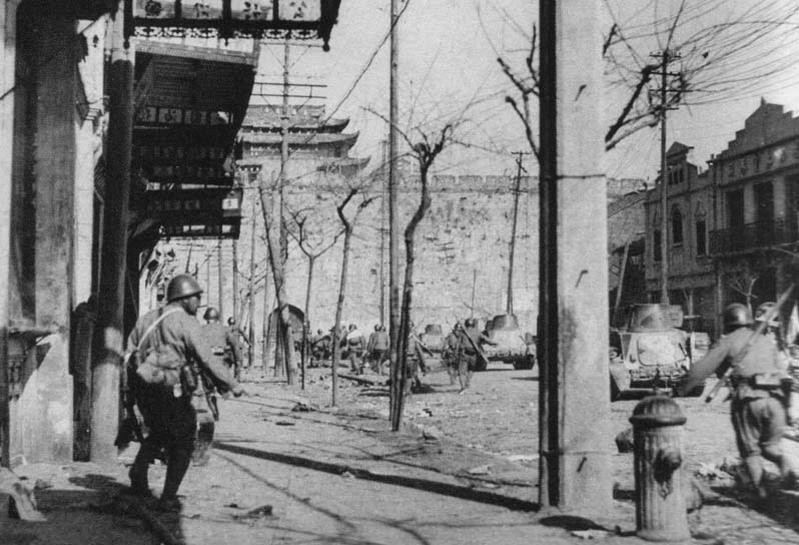
Japanese Type 94 tankettes and soldiers attack the Zhongshan gate on the Nanjing city wall

Unbeknownst to the Japanese, Chiang had already ordered Tang to abandon the defense. In spite of his earlier promise about holding out in Nanjing to the bitter end, Chiang telegraphed an order to Tang on December 11 to abandon the city. Tang prepared to do so the next day on December 12, but startled by Japan's intensified onslaught he made a frantic last-minute bid to conclude a temporary ceasefire with the Japanese through German citizens John Rabe and Eduard Sperling. Only when it became clear that the negotiations could not be completed in time did Tang finally finish drawing up a plan calling for all his units to launch a coordinated breakout of the Japanese encirclement. They were to commence the breakout under cover of darkness at 11:00 pm that night and then muster in Anhui. Just after 5:00 pm on December 12, Tang arranged for this plan to be transmitted to all units, and then he crossed the Yangtze River, escaping through the city of Pukou on the opposite bank of the river less than twenty-four hours before it was occupied by Japan's Kunisaki Detachment.

By the time Tang slipped out of the city, however, the entire Nanjing Garrison Force was rapidly disintegrating with some units in open retreat. Furthermore, contact had already been lost with many units (such as the 87th division) who never received Tang's message, and thus continued to hold their positions as ordered. However even those that did receive Tang's orders faced tremendous difficulties at slipping through the Japanese lines.

=== Unit-by-unit breakout attempts ===
In accordance with Tang's orders, the Guangdong 66th Corps under Ye Zhao and elements of the 83rd Corps under Deng Longguang gathered their remaining forces to break through the Japanese lines using a gap in the east, an extremely difficult task given the circumstances. Upon exiting the Taiping Gate, the troops of the Guangdong Army had to navigate both Chinese and Japanese minefields, then move through the countryside using pre-planned escape routes. Despite avoiding roads and Japanese armored patrols, the Guangdong troops were forced to fight through multiple attacks by Japanese units, and suffered many casualties including two divisional chiefs of staff in combat. After a three-day trek through the devastated countryside, the survivors of the two corps regrouped in Ningguo south of Nanjing, before being sent further south. Of the 12,500 men in the two corps at the start of the battle, only some 3,000 or 4,000 of them made it out of Nanjing. According to Ye Zhao, the 159th and 160th divisions of his 66th Corps still had more than 7,800 officers and soldiers after breaking out of the capital.

One of the units that did manage to escape Nanjing intact was China's 2nd Army led by Xu Yuanquan, situated just north of Nanjing. Though Xu never received Tang's order to abandon the defense, on the night of December 12 he had heard that Nanjing had been captured, and so decided to withdraw on his own accord. Having obtained some 20 private vessels ahead of time, the 2nd Army managed to evacuate 11,851 officers and soldiers, save for the 5,078 casualties already lost in battle, across the Yangtze River just before Japanese naval units blockaded the way. In addition, some 5,000 men and officers of the 74th Corps were also successfully evacuated across the river, as they had secured a boat for themselves in time.

Other units were less fortunate. Near dawn on December 13, a different part of the 74th Corps was destroyed in its attempt to break through Japanese lines along the Yangtze River south of Nanjing. According to the battle report of the 51st Division, the unit had suffered 4,070 killed and 3,785 wounded in the fighting for Nanjing.

Of the 1,000-2,000 troops of the 103rd Division from the former Guizhou Army, only 500 troops managed to break out. The 112th Division of the Northeastern Army was in a worse condition, with only 60 soldiers from the unit managing to cross the Yangtze River. The regular police, which participated in the battle with more than 6,000 men, had only 840 who broke out of the city, with the remaining 5,160 presumed dead.

Due to the chaotic nature of the evacuation in the city, only between 3,000 and 4,000 men of the 36th Division and 2,400 men from the Gendarmerie MP units managed to cross the Yangtze as planned, roughly half their strength. According to its own battle report, the 78th Corps (consisting of the 36th division and a supplementary brigade) participated in the battle with 11,967 troops and suffered 228 killed, 285 wounded, and 6,673 missing. By the end of December, the 78th Corps had taken in 4,937 officers and soldiers. The Nanjing Gendarmerie Military Police participated in the battle with 5,452 officers and soldiers, and suffered 794 killed, 56 wounded, and 2,184 missing. According to the casualty survey compiled by the Gendarmerie Headquarters on 1 July 1939, 3,097 of its men were killed and 14 badly wounded in the battle of Nanjing.

Due to their heavy losses from combat and proximity to the frontline, only between one and two thousand troops from the 88th Division escaped over the river, as did another thousand troops from the Training Division. Sun Yuanliang, commander of the 72nd Corps and 88th Division, claimed in his memoir to have led 600 of his men to reach Wuhan in late March 1938. Deputy commander Zhou Zhenqiang recalled the Training Division taking in 4,000 officers and soldiers after crossing the river. The 87th Division, which arrived at the Xiaguan wharves far too late with some 3,000 men, only had 300 survivors. Yu Jishi reported taking in 500 survivors and 400 rifles from the 87th Division.

During the battle of Nanjing, the Zhenjiang and Jiangning Fortresses exchanged fire with the Imperial Japanese Navy until December 12, breaking out on December 13 after suffering heavy losses from combined assaults of infantry, aircraft, and naval guns. All of the artillery guns and most of their equipment were destroyed or abandoned, and more than 1,000 of the defenders were killed, wounded, or went missing.

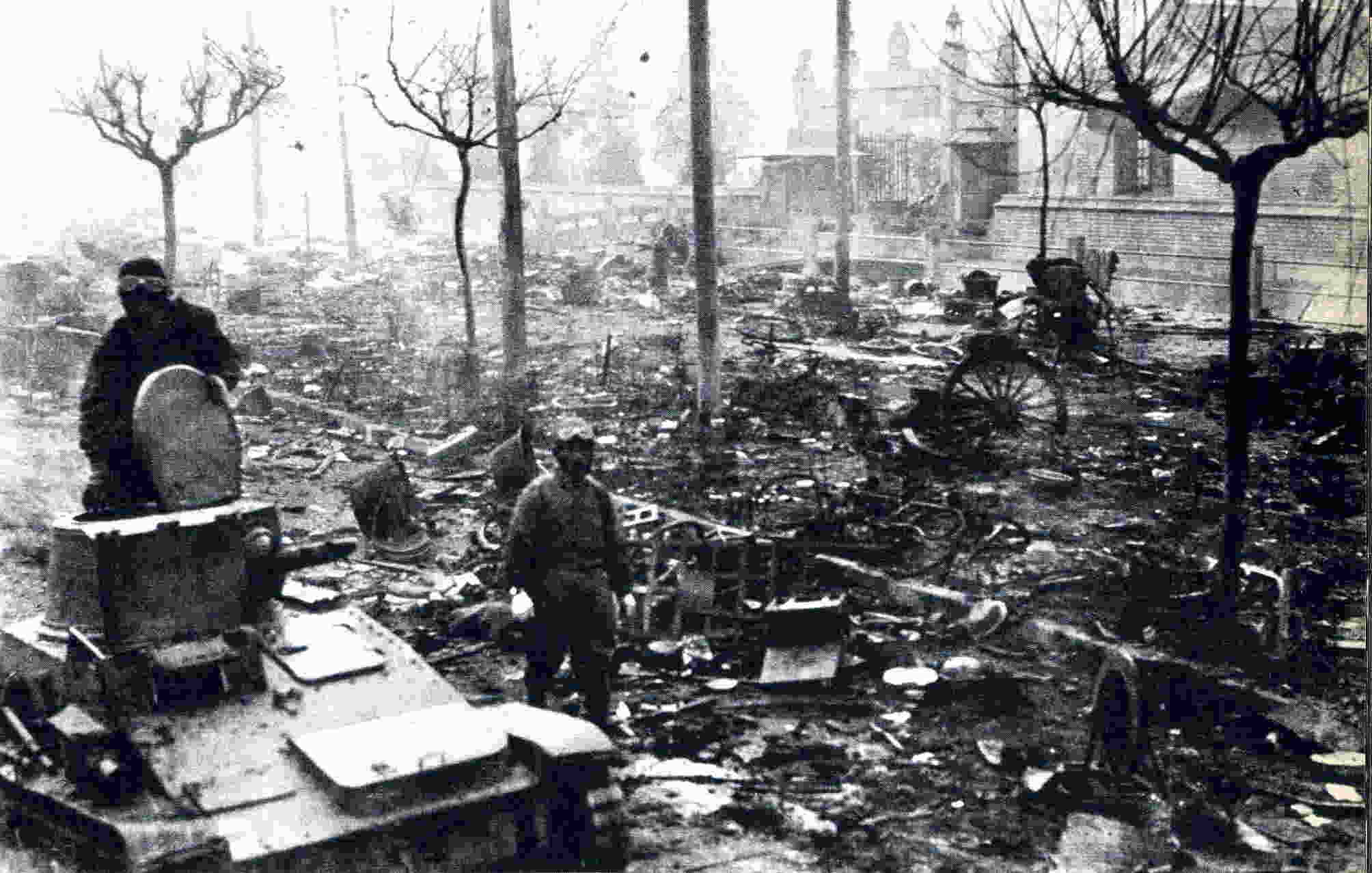
Debris scattered on Nanjing's Zhongshan Road

Perhaps the worst moments of the rout were in the city's northwest suburbs and the Xiaguan harbor itself. Near the Yijiang Gate, a massive crowd of fleeing Chinese soldiers and civilians from the south side of Nanjing, who were fleeing in panicked disarray from the advance of the Japanese, were funneled violently through the exit. However, only half of the gate was open, and combined with the crowd's density and disorganized movements, a deadly bottleneck formed that resulted in hundreds of people being crushed or trampled to death, including Colonel Xie Chengrui of the Training Division. Adding to the mayhem were barrier troops of the 36th Division posted atop the gate, who had not received word of Tang's orders and mistaken members of the crowd for deserters. Errors in communication resulted in those soldiers opening fire on parts of the crowd. So violent was the clash that a tank charged the barrier troops at around 9:00 pm, crushing many people until it was destroyed by a grenade.

Those who made it to Xiaguan were faced with "unimaginable chaos", because there was a severe shortage of boats as a consequence of Tang's earlier orders, and much of the harbor had been set aflame by Japanese bombardment. As a result, the crowd would frequently fight to clamber aboard what few craft were available, resulting in some becoming so overloaded that they sank midway across the 2 km stretch. Those who rigged improvised rafts rarely made it across the river, as their makeshift vessels frequently broke apart in the water. Many Chinese soldiers who couldn't get on a boat took to the Yangtze's rough and frigid waters while clinging to logs, furniture and pieces of scrap lumber, though most were quickly swallowed up by the river, or froze to death beforehand due to the icy waters from the winter cold. By the afternoon of December 13, the Japanese had virtually completed their encirclement of Nanjing, and patrols and sailors on naval vessels began shooting at soldiers and civilians crossing the Yangtze from both sides of the river. Others who saw this turned back to the city in despair.

Many of these tens of thousands of Chinese soldiers who could not escape the city responded by casting off their uniforms and weaponry, switching to civilian clothes often by stealing them from passersby, and then desperately seeking sanctuary in the Nanking Safety Zone by mingling with civilians.

The American journalist F. Tillman Durdin "witnessed the wholesale undressing of an army that was almost comic". "Arms were discarded along with uniforms, and the streets became covered with guns, grenades, swords, knapsacks, coats, shoes and helmets ... In front of the Ministry of Communications and for two blocks further on, trucks, artillery, busses, staff cars, wagons, machine-guns, and small arms became piled up as in a junk yard."

== The Nanjing Massacre ==
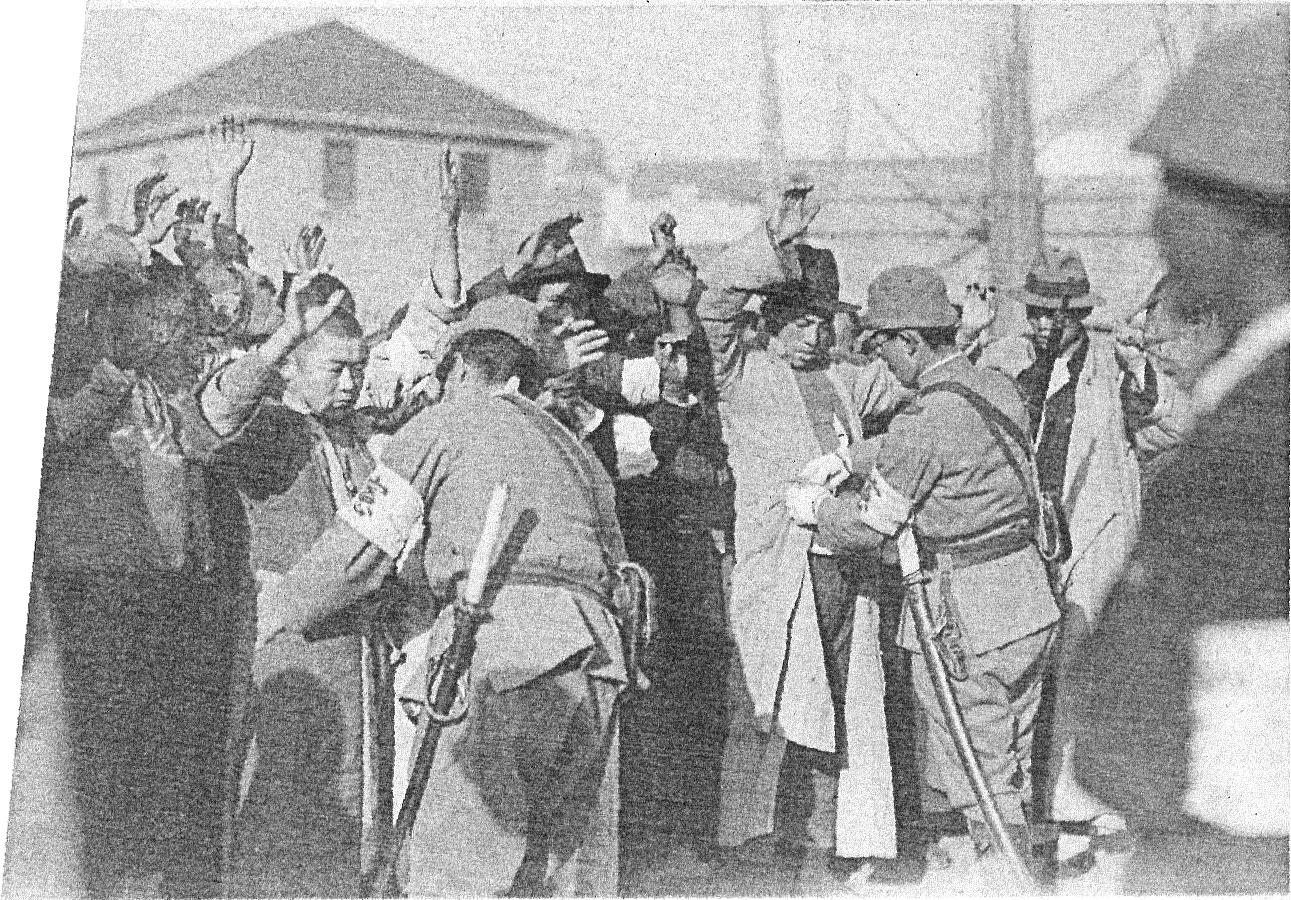
Kenpeitai officers searching Chinese men for weapons

=== "Mopping-up operations": the mass execution of prisoners ===
By the late morning December 13, all major gates to the city had been captured by the Japanese. The fighting in Nanjing did not end on the night of December 12–13, when the Japanese Army took the remaining gates and entered the city. During their mopping-up operations in the city the Japanese continued for several more days to beat back sporadic resistance from remnant Chinese forces. Though Mufushan, just north of Nanjing, was taken by Japan's Yamada Detachment without much bloodshed on the morning of December 14, pockets of resistance outside Nanjing persisted for several more days.

Months of fighting had taught the Chinese defenders to expect no mercy if captured by Japanese forces, and many who remained in the city were frantically seeking a way out before it was too late. For some units like those in the Guangdong Army, there were detailed plans establishing a route out of Nanjing. As a result, there were hundreds, or perhaps thousands, of Chinese stragglers who managed to slip through Japanese lines, in groups or individually. However, these plans were only good for those who got word of them, with most being intercepted by Japanese troops or remaining in the city, meeting almost certain death.

Meanwhile, the Japanese units in Nanjing, under the pretense of rooting out military opposition, began conducting thorough searches of every building in Nanjing for Chinese soldiers, and made frequent incursions into the Nanking Safety Zone in search of them. Japanese units attempted to identify former soldiers by checking if they had marks on their shoulders from wearing a backpack or carrying a rifle. However, the criteria used were often arbitrary; one Japanese company apprehended all men with "shoe sores, callouses on the face, extremely good posture, and/or sharp-looking eyes" and for this reason many civilians were taken at the same time. According to George Fitch, head of Nanjing's YMCA, "rickshaw coolies, carpenters, and other laborers are frequently taken." Chinese police officers and firefighters were also targeted, with even street sweepers and Buddhist burial workers from the Red Swastika Society being marched away on suspicion of being soldiers.

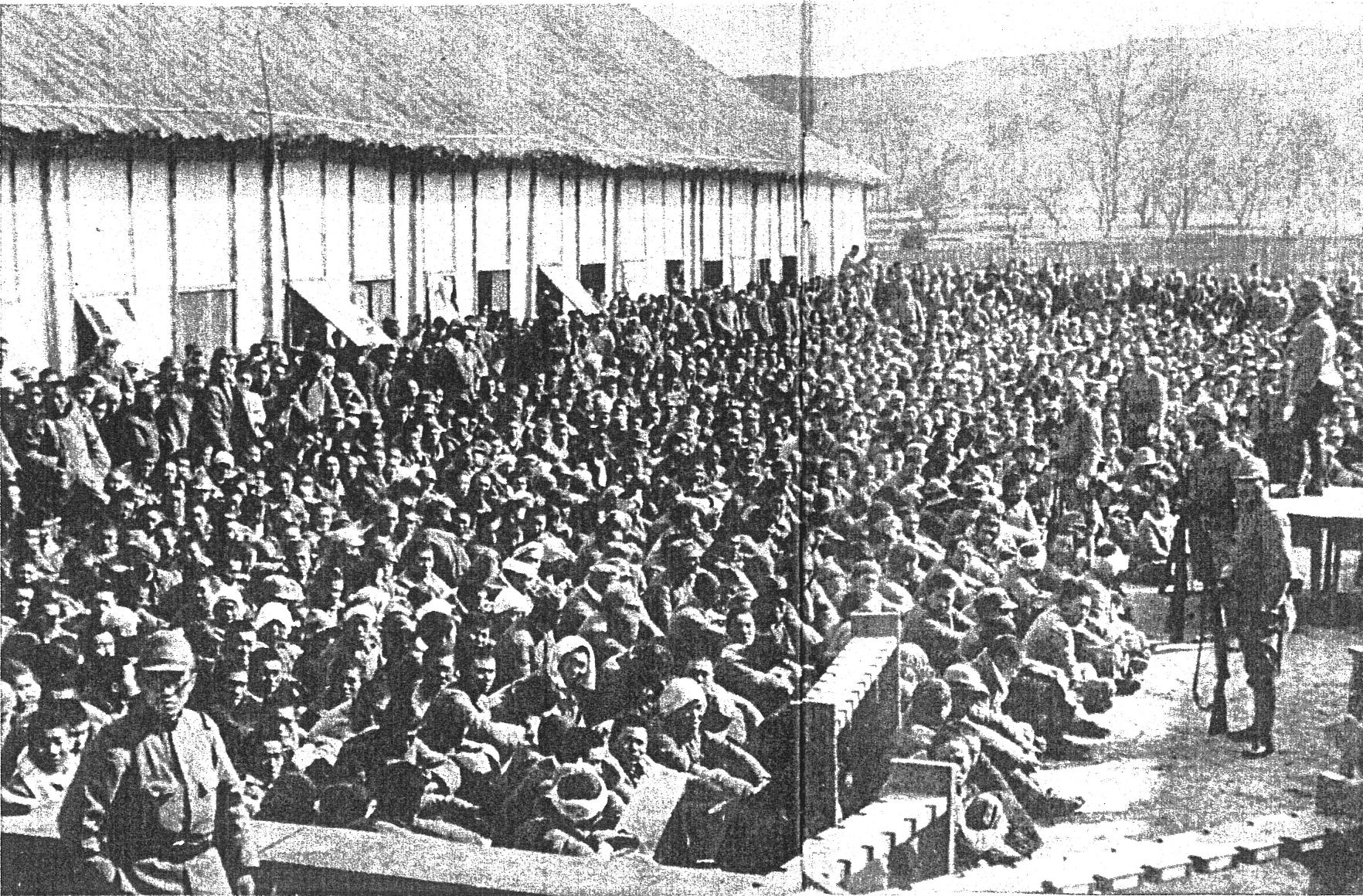
Chinese men rounded up in the "mopping-up operations". All of them would be killed within a few days, and their bodies dumped into the Yangtze

Chinese prisoners who were rounded up were summarily executed en masse as part of an event that came to be known as the Nanjing Massacre, which the foreign residents and journalists in Nanjing made known internationally within days of the city's fall.

The massacres were organized to kill many people quickly. Usually, Japanese troops used machine guns to mow down rows of unarmed prisoners, then finished them off with bayonets or revolvers. In one instance, troops from the Yamada Detachment and the 65th Infantry Regiment led 17,000 to 20,000 Chinese prisoners to the banks of the Yangtze River near Mufushan and machine-gunned them to death. They disposed of the corpses by burning or flushing them downstream.

In many other instances, prisoners were decapitated, used for bayonet practice, or tied together, doused in gasoline and set on fire. Wounded Chinese soldiers who remaining in the city were killed in their hospital beds, bayonetted, clubbed, or dragged outside and burned alive. The massacres were usually conducted on the banks of the Yangtze River to facilitate the mass disposal of corpses.

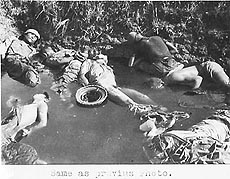
Photo by Bernhard Sindberg of a pond full of executed Chinese POWs who had received false promises of clemency by the Japanese

The rounding-up and mass killings of male civilians and genuine POWs were referred to euphemistically as "mopping-up operations" in Japanese communiqués, in a manner "just like the Germans were to talk about 'processing' or 'handling' Jews." The number of prisoners of war executed is disputed, as numerous male civilians were falsely accused of being former soldiers and summarily executed. The International Military Tribunal in Tokyo, using the thorough records of the Safety Zone Committee, found that some 20,000 male civilians were killed on false grounds of being soldiers, whilst another 30,000 genuine former combatants were unlawfully executed and their bodies disposed of in the river. Other estimates vary: Colonel Uemura Toshimichi wrote in his war diary that somewhere between 40,000 and 50,000 Chinese prisoners were executed, but makes no distinction between soldiers or male civilians. Zhaiwei Sun estimates between 36,500 and 40,000 Chinese prisoners of war were executed after capture.

=== The Rape of Nanjing ===
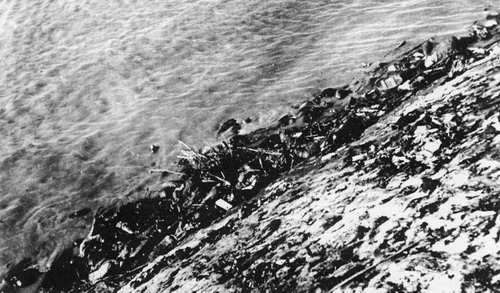
Bodies of Chinese refugees massacred by Japanese troops on the banks of the Yangtze River

Along with the mass executions of young men, the Japanese also committed numerous acts of murder, torture, rape, looting, and arson during their occupation of Nanjing.

According to the International Military Tribunal for the Far East, the total number of civilians and prisoners of war murdered in Nanjing and its vicinity during the first six weeks of the Japanese occupation was over 200,000 while at least 20,000 women were raped, including infants and the elderly. Recent research estimates up to 80,000 women and children were victimized. Japanese soldiers murdered many of their rape victims immediately afterward. Estimates for the total death toll of the Nanjing Massacre vary widely, from 40,000 at the least to 430,000 at the greatest.

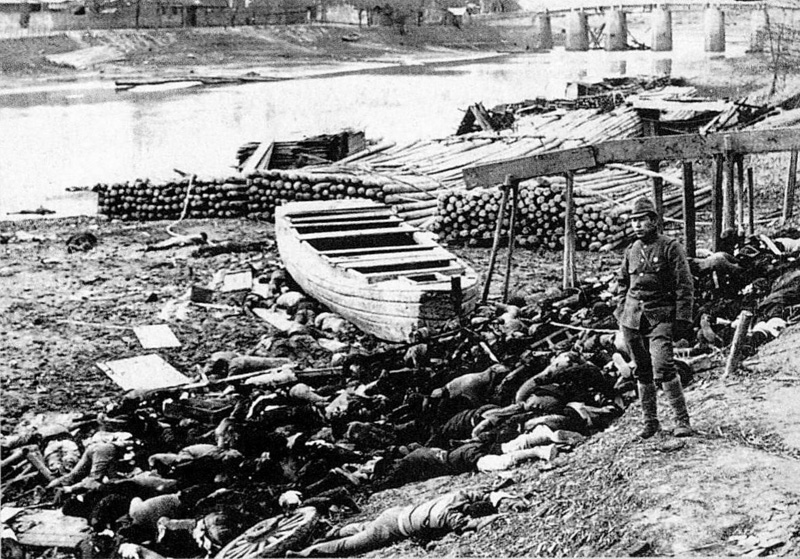
Victims of the Nanjing Massacre

By December 30, most Japanese soldiers had left Nanjing, though units of the Shanghai Expeditionary Army stayed on to occupy the city. The Nanjing Self-Government Committee, a new municipal authority formed from local Chinese collaborators, was inaugurated on January 1, 1938, but it was not until February 25 that all restrictions on the free movement of civilians into and out of the city were lifted.

== Casualties ==
The capture of Nanjing had been quicker and easier than the Japanese had foreseen. Excluding the Yamada Detachment, they lost only 1,558 soldiers in battle, plus 4,619 wounded. According to Benjamin Lai, casualties for the IJA over the entire month-long campaign are estimated at 26,000 killed and wounded.

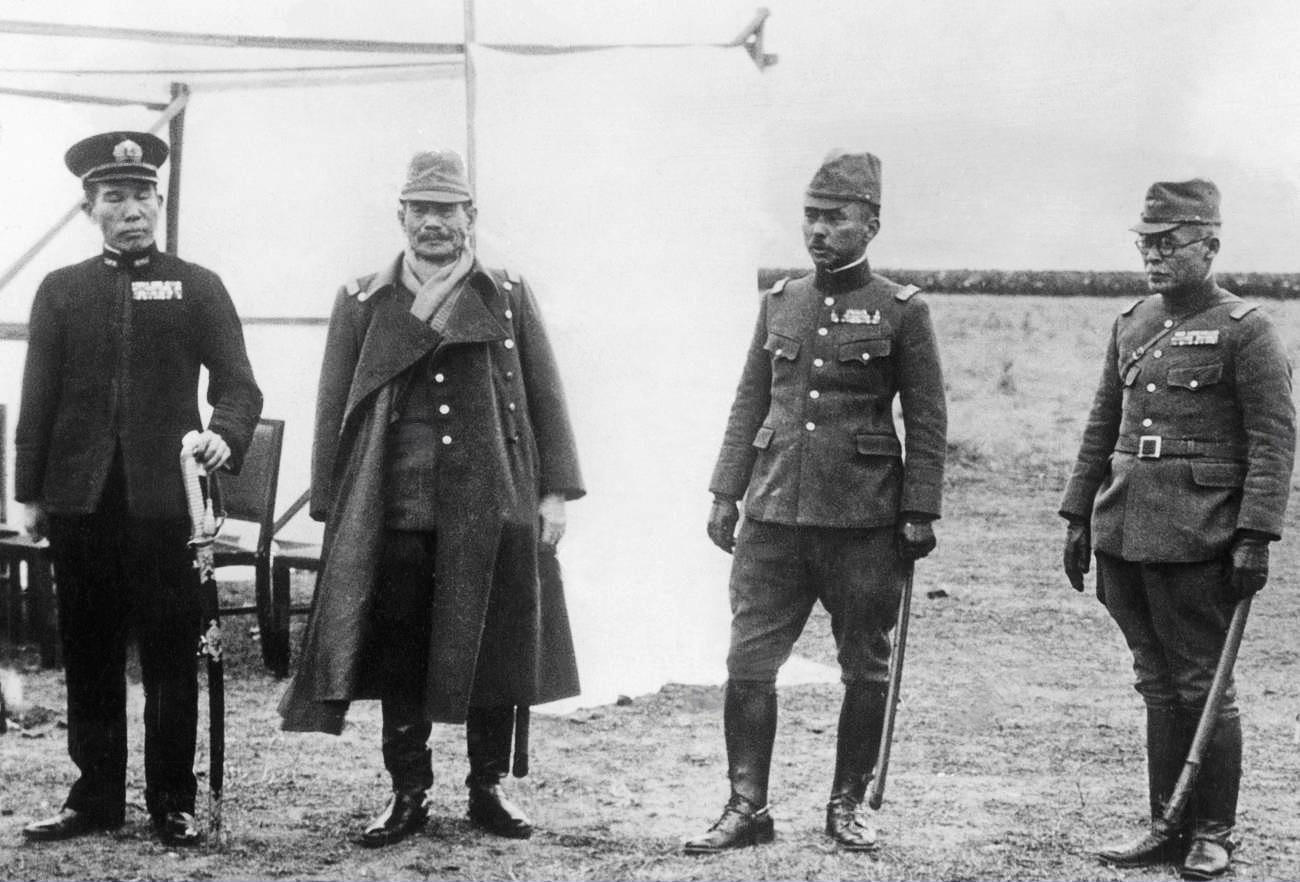
Japanese military leaders Kiyoshi Hasegawa (admiral), Iwane Matsui, Prince Yasuhiko Asaka, and Heisuke Yanagawa at the Memorial Ceremony for War Dead at Nanking Airfield on December 13, 1937

Chinese casualties were undoubtedly significantly higher, though no precise figures exist on how many Chinese were killed in action. The Japanese claimed to have killed up to 84,000 Chinese soldiers during the Nanjing campaign, whereas a contemporary Chinese source claimed that their army suffered 20,000 casualties in the fighting. Masahiro Yamamoto noted that the Japanese usually inflated their opponent's body counts by a factor of three while the Chinese had reason to downplay the scale of their loss. Ikuhiko Hata estimates that 50,000 Chinese soldiers were killed in combat during the entire battle whereas Jay Taylor puts the number at 70,000, and states that proportionate to the size of the force committed, such losses were greater than those suffered in the Battle of Shanghai. On the other hand, Chinese scholar Sun Zhaiwei estimates Chinese combat losses at 6,000 to 10,000 men. New York Times correspondent Tillman Durdin estimated some 33,000 Chinese soldiers had died in the city of Nanjing, including 20,000 who had been executed unlawfully as prisoners of war.

The number of Chinese soldiers wounded in action also lacks precise figures, but was undoubtedly also very high. Towards the end of November, wounded soldiers were arriving in Nanjing from the front line at a rate of 2,000 to 3,000 men per day, double the rate of the attrition in Shanghai. Many of these wounded soldiers would not receive adequate treatment due to the poor state of China's medical services, and also because Nanjing's hospitals were unable to treat so many patients at once. As a result, many injured soldiers were neglected and often succumbed to their wounds, a number estimated by Masahiro Yamamoto to be 9,000 total. Despite the efforts of hospital staff to evacuate as many wounded soldiers as possible during the last days of the battle, many, perhaps the majority of wounded Chinese soldiers were left behind in Nanjing at the mercy of the Japanese. Most, if not all of them, would be executed.

== Aftermath ==
News of the massacre was tightly censored in Japan, where Nanjing's capture provoked a frenzy of excitement among the citizenry. Mass celebrations of every sort, either spontaneous or government-sponsored, took place throughout the country, including a number of resplendent lantern parades which were still vividly remembered by onlookers several decades later. F. Tillman Durdin noted even before Nanjing had fallen that "Events in the field have renewed the belief of the Japanese people in the invincibility of their arms."

An official report of the Nationalist Government argued that an excess of untrained and inexperienced troops was a major cause of the defeat, but at the time Tang Shengzhi was made to bear much of the blame and later historians have also criticized him. Japanese historian Tokushi Kasahara, for instance, has characterized his battlefield leadership as incompetent, arguing that an orderly withdrawal from Nanjing may have been possible if Tang had carried it out on December 11 or if he had not fled his post well in advance of most of his beleaguered units. However, Chiang's very decision to defend Nanjing is also controversial. Masahiro Yamamoto believes that Chiang chose "almost entirely out of emotion" to fight a battle he knew he could only lose, and fellow historian Frederick Fu Liu concurs that the decision is often regarded as one of "the greatest strategical mistakes of the Sino-Japanese war". Still, the historian Jay Taylor notes that Chiang was convinced that to run from his capital city "without a serious fight ... would forever be regarded as a cowardly decision".

In spite of its military accomplishment, Japan's international reputation was blackened by the Nanjing Massacre, as well as by a series of international incidents that occurred during and after the battle. Most notable among them were the shelling by Japanese artillery of the British steamship Ladybird on the Yangtze River on December 12, and the sinking by Japanese aircraft of the American gunboat Panay not far downstream on the same day. The Allison Incident, the slapping of an American consul by a Japanese soldier, further increased tensions with the United States.

Furthermore, the loss of Nanjing did not force China to capitulate as Japan's leaders had predicted. Even so, buoyed by their victory, the Japanese government replaced the lenient terms for peace which they had relayed to the mediator Ambassador Trautmann prior to the battle with an extremely harsh set of demands that were ultimately rejected by China. On December 17 in a fiery speech entitled, "A Message to the People Upon Our Withdrawal from Nanjing", Chiang Kai-shek defiantly declared that,

The outcome of this war will not be decided at Nanking or in any other big city; it will be decided in the countryside of our vast country and by the inflexible will of our people ... In the end we will wear the enemy down. In time the enemy's military might will count for nothing. I can assure you that the final victory will be ours.

The Second Sino-Japanese War was to drag on for another eight years and ultimately end with Japan's surrender in 1945.

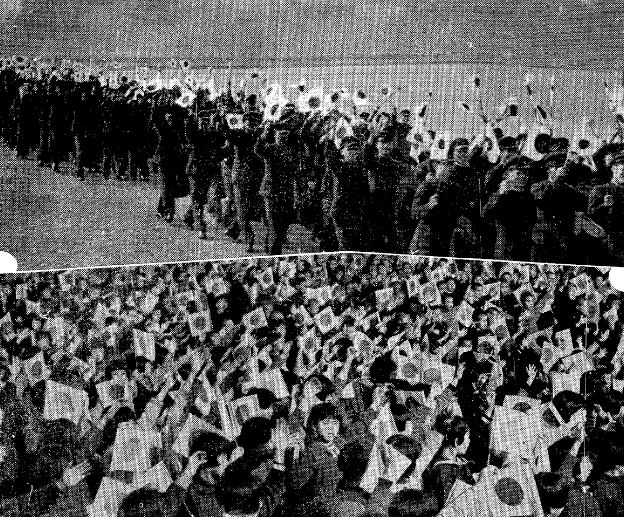
Celebrations in Japan following the fall of Nanjing

December 17 victory parade as seen in the Japanese propaganda film Nanking (1938)

== See also ==
- Air Warfare of WWII from the Sino-Japanese War perspective
- Battle of Wuhan—The battle over the new wartime capital of China following the Fall of Nanjing
- Battle of Chongqing—The battle over the wartime capital of China following the Fall of Wuhan
- Nanjing Massacre
