= Deng Longguang =

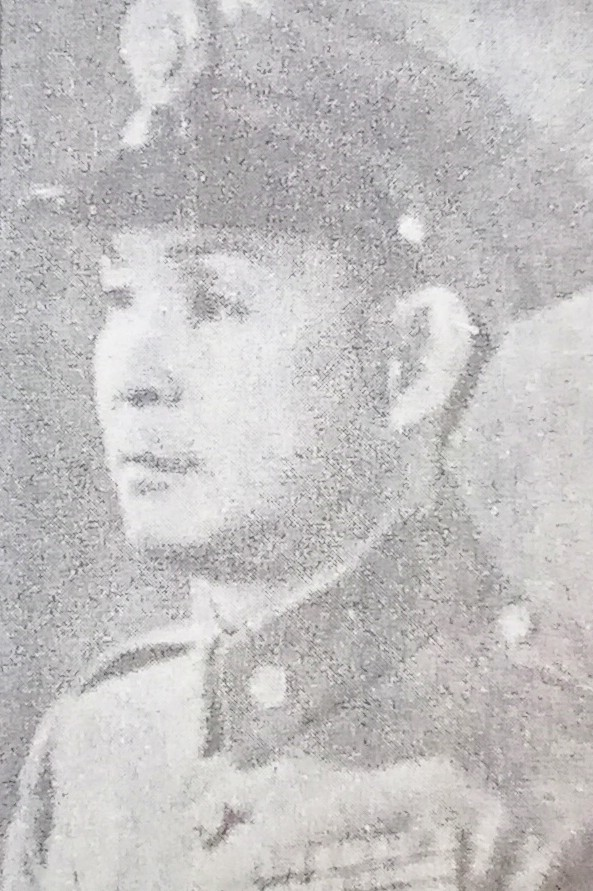
Deng Longguang

Deng Longguang (traditional Chinese: 鄧龍光; simplified Chinese: 邓龙光; pinyin: Dèng Lóngguāng; Wade–Giles: Teng Lung-kuang; 18 October 1896 – 3 February 1979) was a National Revolutionary Army general from Guangdong during the Second Sino-Japanese War and the Chinese Civil War.

== Biography ==
In 1916, Deng entered the sixth class of the infantry department at the Baoding Military Academy. After graduation, he returned to Guangdong to serve in the Guangdong Army. In 1923, he was assigned to the 3rd Division of the Guangdong Army as an adjutant of the 11th Regiment, 6th Brigade. During the Northern Expedition he served as deputy commander of the 4th Army's Training Division (later promoted to division commander). After the Northern Expedition, Deng's unit was reorganized into the 10th Brigade of the 4th Division. He served as brigade commander, chief of staff of the 12th Division, commander of the 4th Independent Division, and commander of the 9th Division of the 4th Route Army under Chen Jitang, who governed Guangdong.

After the 1936 Liangguang Incident which saw Chen removed from power in Guangdong, Deng's troops were reorganized by the Nationalist government, and he was appointed commander of the 156th Division and promoted to lieutenant general. After the outbreak of the Second Sino-Japanese War, Deng was promoted to deputy commander of the 83rd Army and sent to participate in the Battle of Nanjing, where he broke out of a Japanese encirclement. He was later transferred to serve as deputy commander of the 29th Corps, commander-in-chief of the 35th Group Army, and deputy commander of the 2nd Front Army.

In 1949, Deng moved with the Nationalist government to Taiwan. He died in Taipei on 3 February 1979.
