= Jiangjun =

Jiangjun (Chinese: 將軍) is the Chinese name for a general officer. It can also refer to the following places:

- Jiangjun District, district in Tainan, Taiwan
- Jiangjun Mountain, mountain in Jiangsu Province, China
