= Junjun =

Junjun may refer to:

- JunJun, a character from the Sailor Moon franchise
- Junjun (singer) (born 1988), former member of the all-girl J-pop group Morning Musume
- Hilario Davide III (born 1964), Filipino politician
- Jejomar Binay Jr. (born 1977), Filipino politician
- Jun-Jun, a song on the 1997 album Demonic by Testament

== See also ==
- Junjung, a West African drum
