= Jiangjun Mountain =

Mountain in Nanjing, China

Jiangjun Mountain (Chinese: 将军山; pinyin: jiāngjūnshān) is located near Tiexin Bridge in Jiangning District, Nanjing, Jiangsu Province, China. Facing Qinhuai River, it borders Niushou Mountain. Today, it is a place of historical interest.

== The environment ==
=== Lake ===
Jiangjun mountain is situated at the center of numerous mountains. A ground spring at the top of the mountain flows down the side and forms a lake at the bottom of the mountain.

=== Metasequoia ===
The metasequoia tree is a peculiar scene in Jiangjun mountain due to its mystery. It is always hidden in the shadow and the air there is fresh and humid. The winding bridge, made of metasequoia, leads tourists to the interior the mountain.

== History ==
=== Jin Army ===
In 1129, the Jin Army invaded. However the Jin army was inexperienced with sea warfare, so Wuzhu decided to withdraw.

In April 1130, the Yue Army of Song defeated the Jin Army at Jiangjun mountain.

The remaining ramparts are now historical relics from the battle. There are about 4,200 kilometers of ramparts from the New Qinhuai River of Tiexin bridge to Jiangjun Mountain and Niushou Mountain. The condition of the ramparts are especially well preserved on Jiangjun Mountain.

=== Food ===
One of the most famous food in Jiangjun Mountain is “泡椒花枝片” called the Pickle Cuttlefish. It is a homemade food which many people get here to have a taste of it. The “花枝” is the cuttlefish we met in daily life. Cooking it is very easy. Just use some cuttlefish with some onion and garlic, certainly can not except pickle. This diet contains the taste, the smelling and the good-looking. “竹蛏浸水蛋” is another famous food in Jiangjun Mountain. “竹蛏” is the Solen grandis which is a life live in lakes. It use Solen grandis and eggs too cook. With so much chili in it you can taste such a spicy diet in Jiangjun Mountain. The last famous food in Jiangjun Mountain is called “将军山泉水鱼”. It use the fish named herring which lives in Jingping Lake in Jiangjun Mountain. Use the way like Sichuan cooking to make this food which mixed the herring and vegetables. You will have the feeling of delicious and spicy.
