= Evelyn Waldren =

American pioneering pilot

Evelyn Esther Nicholas Waldren
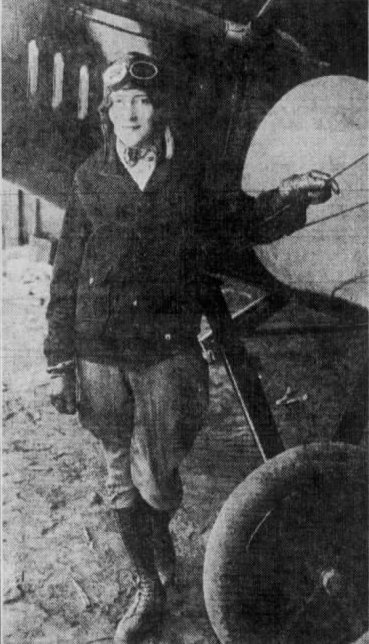
- Waldren circa 1928
- Born: Evelyn Esther Nicholas; June 25, 1908; Stockham, Nebraska, U.S.
- Died: October 25, 1986 (aged 78); Centralia, Washington, U.S.
- Occupations: Pilot and flight instructor

Evelyn Esther Nicholas Burleson Whitmaker Waldren (June 25, 1908 – October 25, 1986) was the first woman in Nebraska to become a pilot, the first woman in North Dakota with a transport pilot's license, and one of the first women in the United States with a flight instructor's license. In 1941, she set a new speed and distance record for female pilots in light planes.

== Childhood ==
Waldren was born Evelyn Esther Nicholas in Stockham, Nebraska. Her parents divorced when she was young, and she and her younger sister, Virginia, were raised by their mother and stepfather. When she was five years old, her family moved to Lincoln, Nebraska. Her stepfather was a "heavy duty equipment operator". A self-described tomboy, Waldren grew up helping him in his garage and visiting the construction sites where he worked. She attended McKinley School and Bryant School. She was skilled at drawing and considered a career as an artist.

In the summer of 1926, Waldren saw an airshow in the small southern Nebraskan town where her stepfather was working on a railroad. She wanted to go for a plane ride, but her parents were concerned about the risks. Aviation appealed to her because of the good pay, the opportunity for travel, and the chance to work outdoors. Hearing about the feats of pilots like Ruth Elder, Charles Lindbergh and Phoebe Omlie strengthened her resolve.

== Flight training ==
Despite Waldren's arguments, her mother and stepfather refused to let her fly. Finally, on March 1, 1928, Waldren's mother agreed to let her train at the Lincoln School of aviation and to pay for the first fifty hours of lessons. As she told the story in 1986, "My mother enrolled me, paid $50 and said, 'You're on your own now: probably just a whim anyhow.' Well, this whim has lasted 56 years."

On March 3, Waldren took her first flight in a surplus World War I biplane. She remembered it as "the most remarkable, wonderful feeling. I felt the rush of wind in my face, smelled the exhaust. It looked like a fairyland down there." After 14 hours of practice, Nicholas flew alone for the first time on June 7 at Page Field. Later that year, she obtained her pilot's license, becoming the first female pilot in Nebraska. By then, she had spent 75 hours flying solo.

For ten years, Waldren's father, Wilhelm Nicholas, had not known where she was. After he recognized her picture in the newspaper, he was reunited with his daughters in 1928.

== Great Depression ==
After graduating flight school, Waldren moved to Rockford, Illinois, where she carried passengers and did exhibition flying. She hoped to get a transport pilot's license, but needed 200 hours of flying time to qualify. After the Great Depression began in August 1929, Waldren had difficulty finding jobs, let alone work that would allow her to fly. She worked as a clerk and a ticket salesman, saving whatever money she could spare towards her transport license. Decades later, she recalled renting a plane and flying it once around the airport for a dollar. She remarked that "I've got a lot of three-, four- and five-minute entries in my log book. It came very slowly." Waldren also hunted coyotes for a $2.50 government bounty, shooting them from a Rearwin Sportster plane. Ranchers' associations would sometimes give her free chicken dinners and free gas for her plane to thank her.

== Jamestown Municipal Airport ==
In 1929, Waldren married Howard Burleson, who had been one of her instructors at the Lincoln flying school. They moved to North Dakota, where she became the first woman in the state to get a transport pilot's license in 1933. With her husband, she ran a flying service out of the Jamestown Municipal Airport from 1931 to 1937, making charter trips. She also worked as an airways observer for the weather bureau and as a station agent and traffic representative for a local firm. She recalled her time there in a 1986 interview:

"I used to fly barnstorming shows in North Dakota during the Depression. We used to send an advance man to a town to pick out a field and tack up some posters. Then we'd hit town on the weekend and put on a couple of shows for the folks. One of our tricks was to toss rolls of toilet paper out of the planes, so they'd unravel all the way down. Well, when we landed, we went back to pick up the paper- but we couldn't find any. You have to remember how poor everyone was. One lady in the audience picked it all up- a whole month's supply."

== Albany Airport ==
Waldren and Howard Burleson managed the Albany Municipal Airport in Oregon from 1937 to 1941. Waldren also wrote a column on aviation for the Albany Democrat-Herald, called Wings Over Willamette. In 1939, she was appointed to the women's committee and the junior activities committee of the National Aeronautic Association's Willamette Valley chapter.

In February 1939, Waldren was appointed an air patrolman by the Albany chief of police, making her the second female air patrolman in Oregon. Her jurisdiction extended over the airport, where she had the responsibility of enforcing aviation law and responding to any emergencies. She was recommended for the post by the Aero Policewoman's Association of America.

In October 1939, Albany Municipal Airport was approved to run a training program for the Civil Aeronautics Authority. Waldren became a Civilian Aviation Authority Flight Examiner after passing her written exam with a score of 94. It was the highest score her examiner had ever given. With this achievement, Waldren became the second women to receive a pilot instructor's license in the United States. Through the program, she instructed an initial group of ten students and a second group of fifteen students. Waldren's second class included six women. The students, who came from Oregon State University, were required to have eight hours of flight instruction before flying on their own.

In 1941, Oregon women reactivated their chapter of the Ninety-Nines, a professional organization for female pilots. Waldren was named vice governor of the chapter, which included Edith Foltz, Leah Hing, and Bessie Gale Halliday.

== Goodwill flight ==
In 1941, Waldren planned a nonstop flight from Canada to Mexico. She wanted to fly to Mexico City, where she would deliver goodwill letters from the governor of Oregon and the mayor of Vancouver, British Columbia. Waldren took off from Vancouver at 2:30 PM on October 1 in her Taylorcraft airplane, Miss Liberty. The plane held 80 gallons of gasoline. She had delayed her flight by a day due to bad weather.

That night, she flew into a fog bank over the Siskiyou Mountains. She considered bailing out, but decided it was too dangerous, since she "was probably too low to jump anyway." Disoriented, she made a series of climbs and dives, then decided her best chance was to try to rise above the mountaintops. After an uncertain amount of time, she emerged from the fog near Mount Shasta.

Waldren landed in Tijuana, Mexico on October 2 at 7:30 a.m., setting a new women's record for speed and distance in a light plane. Her average speed during the flight was 103 miles per hour. Upon landing in Tijuana, she abandoned her plan to fly to Mexico City.

== World War II ==
Waldren was recruited by Jacqueline Cochran to join the British Air Transport Auxiliary, but backed out when her mother and sister objected. Instead, she moved to the U.S. Army base in Alturas, California to train Army cadets to fly. She was one of two female instructors at the base. Waldren stayed at the base for several years, training students in "turns... stalls, spot landings from various altitudes, stick turns, spins, that sort of thing".

== Marriage to Robert Whitmaker ==
Waldren married Robert Whitmaker in 1942. The couple had a son, Douglas Whitmaker, in 1943. They divorced in 1949. Evelyn charged her husband with "cruel and inhuman treatment" and petitioned for custody of Douglas.

== Aircraft transport ==
In 1946, Waldren ferried planes from the Taylorcraft Aviation Corporation in Alliance, Ohio to the Northwest Aircraft Distributing Corporation at Evergreen Field in Washington. She was paid 250 dollars for every plane she transported, but had to arrange her own return trips without compensation. Waldren delivered three to four planes a month, flying 13 to 14 hours a day. In December 1946, Waldren left this job and joined the Piercy Flying Service in Medford, Oregon as a flight instructor.

== Community Involvement ==
Waldren served as the public relations coordinator of the Oregon State Board of Aeronautics. She planned the Central Oregon Aviation Day held in June 1949, an educational event which provided free plane rides. Waldren arranged invitations and registration to the Salem Aviation Day held on August 28, 1949, where she demonstrated pattern flying and dead-stick landings. She also helped organize an airshow in Lebanon, Oregon, and escorted former Oregon resident Kathleen "Klondike Kate" Van Duren to the event.

== Marriage to Robert Waldren ==
Evelyn married Robert Waldren, and together, they managed the Langmack Field airport in Sweet Home, Oregon. There, Evelyn Waldren received her private examiner's rating in 1951, allowing her to give out student pilot certificates. She was the first woman in Oregon with this rating. With their business partner, Homer Moxley, the Waldrens bought the Oregon City Skypark in 1953.

== Career in California ==
Waldren moved to Corvallis, Oregon, where her family lived, "to instruct students learning to fly under the GI Bill." After the program lost funding, she flew for US Forest Service and the California Division of Forestry as a fire spotter. In Enterprise, California, she operated the B & E flying service with another pilot, Helen Benna. After Benna left the business, Waldren became a flight instructor with Shasta Aviation at the Redding Sky Camp in Redding, California. After a heat wave in the summer of 1971, Waldren decided to return to the Pacific Northwest.

== Evergreen Airport ==
In 1971, Waldren began working for the Mill Plain Flying Service at Evergreen Field in Washington as a flight instructor. She remained there until she died in 1986. Six months before her death, Waldren was training nearly a dozen students. That same year, the Federal Aviation Administration named her Instructor of the Year for the Western Region. By the time she died, Waldren had flown 23,700 hours.

== Recognition ==
In 1978, Waldren was named the National OX-5 Pioneer Aviatrix of the Year. In 1984, she was elected to the OX-5 Pioneer Hall of Fame.
