= Mary Riddle =

Native American pilot

- Mary Riddle posing with her plane.
- Born: April 22, 1902; Bruceport, Washington, U.S.
- Died: October 25, 1981 (aged 79); Portland, Oregon, U.S.
- Other name: Kus-de-cha
- Known for: Second Native American woman airplane pilot

Mary Riddle, also known as Kus-de-cha or Kingfisher, (April 22, 1902 – October 25, 1981) was the second Native American woman to earn a pilot's license. Bessie Coleman was the first to earn a license. Soon after earning her pilot's license she also earned her commercial license.

== Early life ==
Riddle was a member of the Clatsop Tribe in Oregon and the Quinault Indian Nation in Washington. She was born on April 22, 1902 in Bruceport, Washington to parents Albert "Doc" Riddell and Elizabeth Salikike. Elizabeth Salikike's family name was also spelled as Salikie and Silackie in various sources.

Riddle said that her grandmother gave her the name Kus-de-cha, meaning 'kingfisher', after noting that her cries sounded like a kingfisher's call. Anthropologist Llyn de Danaan states that the word 'kus-de-cha' does not appear in the Chinook, Clatsop, or Lower Chehalis languages. However, 'kuśdecá' is listed as the Dakota word for kingfisher in the book An English and Dakota Vocabulary.

Riddle had two brothers, Thomas and Valentine. After their mother's death in 1905, Riddle and her brothers were placed in the Chemawa Indian School in Salem, Oregon. In 1911, Riddle was transferred to the Sisters of the Valley Academy in Beaverton, Oregon. Riddle's father died in 1912.

Riddle's interest in aviation began when she first saw an airplane while on a trip home from the Sisters of the Valley Academy. When Riddle was seventeen, she saw a woman fatally crash an airplane. The incident made her determined to prove women could fly well.

== Aviation career ==
=== Pilot ===
Riddle saved money for two years to attend the Rankin Flying School in Portland, run by noted aviator Tex Rankin. Rankin, who also taught Chinese-American pilot Leah Hing, was interested in creating "a 'rainbow', all-female stunt team," but Riddle declined to participate, and the idea fizzled out. She flew solo for the first time on May 10, 1930. "I wasn't scared," said Riddle one month later. "On that first trip alone I just missed the weight of the instructor in the plane." She featured in an airshow at the 1930 Portland Rose Festival, riding up to her plane on horseback and in "full tribal costume." Riddle was one of three female pilots in the show: the others were Dorothy Hester and Edith Foltz. In August of that year, she made plans to fly to Washington, D.C., with "beaded gifts from Indian tribes of the Northwest," to be delivered to for "President Hoover and others." Riddle earned a limited commercial pilot's license in 1933. In June 1934, she was featured on the 99's magazine, The 99er. An all-around athlete, she enjoyed swimming, riding, "golf, tennis, and ice skating."

=== Parachutist ===
Riddle later went to the Spartan School in Tulsa to learn parachute jumping. Though the school was all-male at the time, Riddle convinced them to admit her and graduated with honors. By 1937 she was performing as a parachutist while touring the United States on "The Voice of Washington," advertised as the largest tri-motored plane in the world, on which she also served as chief stewardess. Press described her as quiet and charming. Riddle did forty parachute jumps. In 1937, she almost died when her parachute, which had not opened correctly, became tangled with her legs. The next year, a back injury caused her to quit parachuting.

=== Aircraft Inspector ===
World War II restrictions on civilian aircraft forced Riddle to give up flying. She began working with aluminum sheet metal as part of the U.S. Air Force's Civil Service, reasoning, "I just had to be near airplanes- even if I could not fly them." She was recruited by the government to inspect civilian aircraft and work as an aircraft maintenance advisor. Riddle recalled, "I was a sort of guinea pig, really, on account of being the only woman, but I got along fine."

== Later life ==
After the war, Riddle became a receptionist at the Gibbs and Hill firm in New York City but continued to fly on occasion and to visit the Northwest.

== See also ==
- Bessie Coleman
- Ola Mildred Rexroat
- Eula Pearl Carter Scott
- Leah Hing
- Hazel Ying Lee
