= Silas Christofferson =

American aviation pioneer (1890–1916)

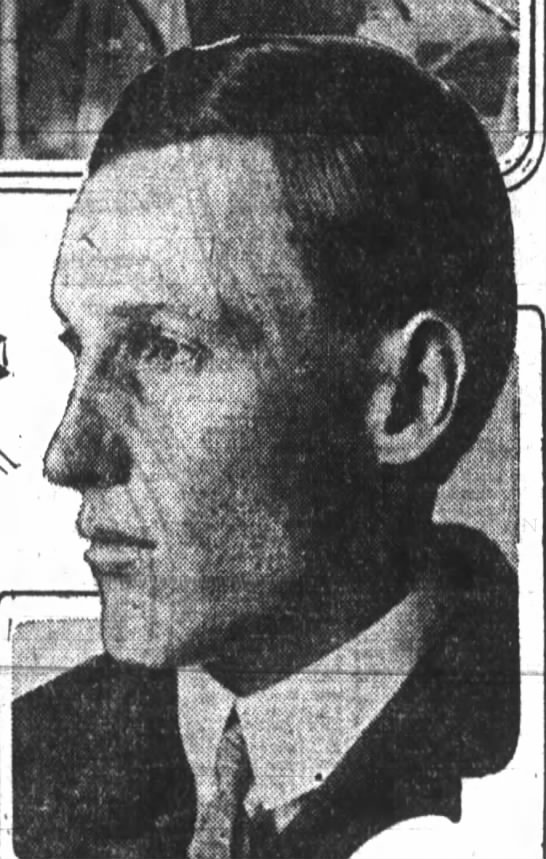
- Christofferson in 1912
- Born: March 15, 1890; Polk County, Iowa
- Died: October 31, 1916 (aged 26); Redwood City, California
- Cause of death: Plane crash
- Burial place: Cypress Lawn Memorial Park, Colma, California
- Occupation: Aviator
- Years active: 1910–1916
- Spouse: Edna Christofferson

Silas G. Christofferson (March 15, 1890 – October 31, 1916) was an American aviator. He was the brother of Harry Christofferson, a fellow Early Bird of Aviation, and the husband of aviator and X-ray technician Edna Christofferson.

Christofferson was born in Polk County, Iowa, in 1890. When he was six years old, his family moved to California. He had six brothers, four of whom also became aviators. The most notable of these was Harry Christofferson. By 1908, Christofferson had moved to Los Angeles, California, where he worked as a chauffeur.

In 1910, Christofferson co-founded the Bennett-Christofferson Airship Company in Portland, Oregon. Also named on the incorporation papers were Fred and Mabel Bennett. The company started out with a capital stock of US$3,000. By 1911, Christofferson and Fred Bennett were making practice flights on the artillery drill grounds of the Vancouver Barracks Vancouver, Washington. They were permitted to fly only in the early morning and after 4:00 p.m. to avoid spooking the mules at the barracks. Christofferson took a passenger, Edna Becker, on at least one of these flights. Becker and Christofferson married on November 19, 1912.

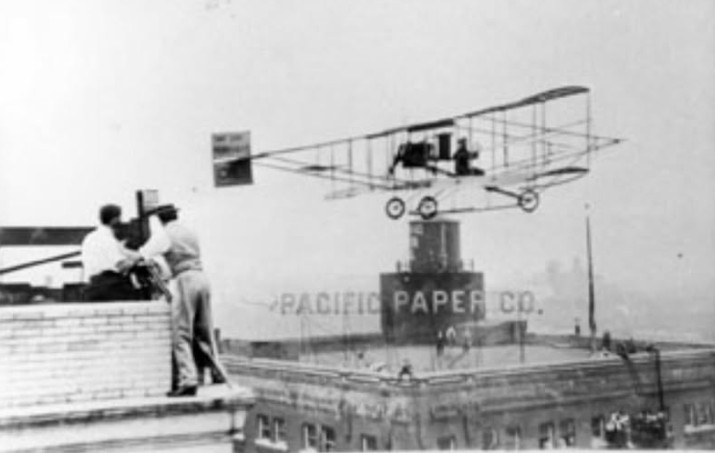
Silas Christofferson takes off from the roof of the Multnomah Hotel in Portland, Oregon, for a flight to Vancouver Barracks on June 11, 1912.

On June 11, 1912, Christofferson flew eight miles (13 kilometres) from a 170-foot-long (52-meter) ramp on the roof of the 150-foot-tall (46-meter) Multnomah Hotel in Portland to the Vancouver Barracks. The flight took him 12 minutes and was observed by a crowd of over 45,000. Upon landing, he said that "[w]hile my trip was not as pleasant as some might think, I enjoyed it immensely." The Oregonian declared it a record-setting feat, claiming Christofferson was the first to "[trust] his heavier-than-air machine in a start from the midst of a business section of a great city."

On June 25, 1914, Christofferson reached an altitude of 15,728 feet (4,794 metres) in a flight over 14,505-foot (4,421-meter) Mount Whitney in the Sierra Nevada of California, setting a national record. It was his second attempt of the day to fly over the mountain: his first attempt, at 5:21 a.m., was unsuccessful due to strong winds.

On October 31, 1916, Christofferson was testing a new biplane prototype at Redwood City, California, to demonstrate its safety. Two hundred feet (61 meters) above the ground, his engine died and his aircraft crashed. He was rushed to the Redwood City Hospital by Edna and Harry. A few hours after the crash, Christofferson died of internal injuries. He was buried beside Lincoln Beachey in Cypress Lawn Memorial Park in Colma, California.

== See also ==
- EAA Aviation Museum
- Walter Edward Kittel (1880–1922) early American aviation pioneer
