= Edna Christofferson =

American aviator, markswoman, and X-ray technician

Edna Emma Christofferson
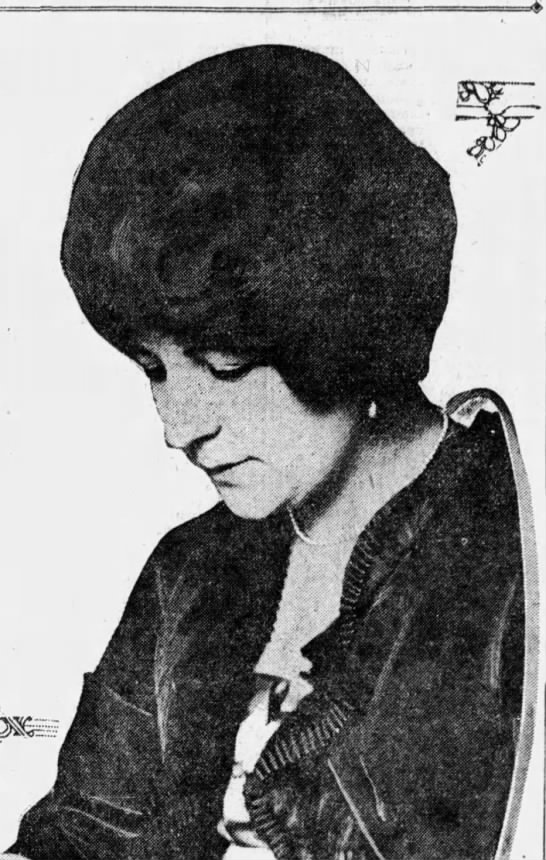
- Born: Edna Emma Bissner; September 4, 1886; Pipestone County, Minnesota, U.S.
- Died: March 8, 1945 (aged 58); Vancouver, Washington, U.S.
- Known for: Aviator, sharpshooter, radiographer

Edna Emma Bissner Christofferson (4 September 1886 - 8 March 1945) was an American aviator, markswoman, and radiographer. She was the wife of pioneering aviator Silas Christofferson.

== Early life ==
Edna Christofferson was the daughter of Martin and Mary Elizabeth Bissner, immigrants from Alsace-Lorraine. Upon arriving in the United States, they settled in Pipestone County, Minnesota, where Edna was born in 1886. She had three siblings who died in childhood: Bertha, Edward, and Jack. Two brothers, William and Harry, survived. When Edna was five years old, her family moved to Vancouver, Washington. She attended school at the House of Providence and was interested in becoming a nurse.

== Marriage to Rudolph Becker ==
Edna married Rudolph Becker Jr. in September 1906. Becker was the heir to the Becker Auto Company, a car dealership in Portland, Oregon.

When the Beckers' home caught fire in 1907, Edna Becker ran back into the flaming building to rescue her pet dog. Since the building also housed their auto garage, the fire was estimated to cause 15,000 dollars' worth of damage (over 403,000 dollars today).

In 1909, Edna's friend Hazel Maddux was accused of vehicular manslaughter. Edna, who had seen the collision, was a reluctant witness. Though she freely admitted knowing the driver's identity, she refused to say who it was, claiming that "The woman has an old and kindly mother whose heart would be broken did she know of this." Maddux was found not guilty.

The Beckers' marriage had ended by November 1912, when Edna Becker married Silas Christofferson. Since Rudolph Becker Jr. was still alive, it can be assumed they had divorced.

== Marriage to Silas Christofferson ==
Becker made her first flight in 1911, with Silas Christofferson as her pilot. She sat on the lower wing of his biplane, holding onto a wooden strut for support. They took off from Pearson Field in Vancouver, reaching heights of 500 feet and circling the field twice. The flight lasted eight minutes.

On September 1, 1912, Silas Christofferson made the first hydroplane flight in Oregon, taking off from Oaks Amusement Park. He chose two women, Edna Becker and Mrs. R.F. Cox, to take turns flying with him. By then, Becker was determined to become a pilot and had ordered her own biplane. As she explained, "I have an inordinate craving to fly at a tremendous height, and I intend to indulge myself."

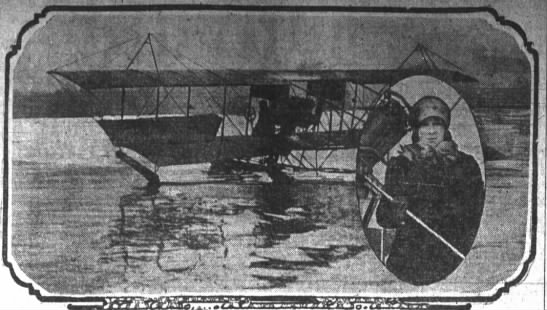
Edna Christofferson with the hydroplane used on her honeymoon flight

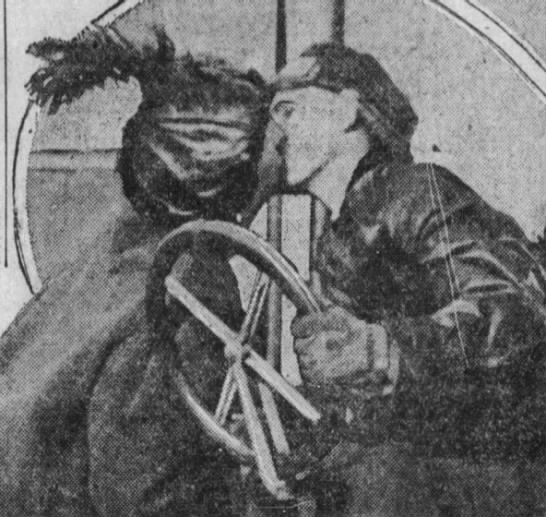
Edna (right) and Silas Christofferson kiss goodbye

Becker was the second of the women to ride with Silas Christofferson, taking off at 5 PM. With no safety harness, she clung to an aluminum bar with a half-inch diameter. Despite a strong wind, the two reached an altitude of 1,250 feet. Upon landing, they received a standing ovation from the tightly packed crowd.

Edna Becker and Silas Christofferson were married on November 19, 1912, at the King Hill apartments in Portland. The marriage took many of their friends by surprise. An hour after the ceremony, they made a honeymoon flight over the Willamette Valley that lasted thirty minutes.

The Christoffersons moved to San Francisco, where Silas opened a flying school. The school, which relocated to Redwood City in 1914, attracted students from around the world and trained several female pilots.

Though Edna made many flights with Silas as her co-pilot, she did not fly solo during their marriage. After she made a mistake while volplaning, Silas refused to give her further lessons "until she should prove capacity to do the right thing at the time of emergency."

A 1913 article mentioned Edna Christofferson helping her husband prepare planes for an air show, and claimed she "knows pretty near everything there is to know about aeroplanes." A Reno Gazette-Journal article, looking back on Silas's career in 1961, mentioned Edna approving a landing site for Silas, and said that "his wife's advice was sought and always adhered to by the famous airman." After the Christoffersons' friend Lincoln Beachey was killed in 1915, she organized a ceremony to commemorate the one-year anniversary of his death.

On October 31, 1916, Silas was testing a new biplane prototype when his engine died. He glided downward for several hundred feet, then fell the last one hundred feet to the ground. Edna had been watching his flight and was one of the first people to reach him. She directed the men who carried him to the ambulance and accompanied him to the hospital, where he died of internal injuries. Edna arranged for him to be buried alongside Lincoln Beachey in the Cypress Lawn Cemetery. After the funeral, she went to stay with relatives on an Oregon ranch for a year.

== Radiology career ==
In 1917, Christofferson enrolled in a post-graduate class in X-ray operation. She struggled with the subject matter at first, but became a proficient radiographer. She began her career at the Providence St. Vincent Medical Center in Oregon, but moved to Seattle to study with Eddy Jerman at "the Providence hospital", possibly Providence Seattle Medical Center. She also worked at the Legacy Good Samaritan Medical Center. After further studies in Chicago, she was named vice president of the American Association of Radiological Technicians.

For six years, Christofferson worked for Dr. F. E. Diemer as his chief radiographer. In 1925, she founded her own school in Portland for Radiographer, teaching basic and advanced courses. She acted as an expert witness in at least one criminal trial, examining the defendant in her capacity as an Radiographic specialist.

Christofferson traveled to Germany in 1930 for post-graduate work at the Lerchenfeld Institute in Hamburg. She was impressed by commercial aviation in Europe, noting the efficiency of the Berlin airport in particular.

By 1932, 153 students had graduated from Christofferson's school. Many went on to become technicians at hospitals throughout the Pacific Northwest.

== Marksmanship ==
Christofferson placed second in an international police shooting competition in 1927, scoring 52 out of 60 points. Participants included members of the Portland, Seattle, Vancouver, and Victoria police departments. Christofferson was the only female competitor.

Christofferson believed that "a pistol, and a knowledge of its operation, is the best possible means of home protection for a woman." She was the founder and president of the Oregon Women's Revolver Club, formed in 1928. The club had fifteen charter members, including Christofferson's sister-in-law, Ethel Bissner. A score of at least 75% in marksmanship was required to join. Christofferson convinced the Portland Police Bureau to sponsor the club and to let them use the police shooting range. She also arranged access to shooting ranges in Clackamas and at Vancouver Barracks.

She was awarded a medal for expert shooting by the United States Department of War after achieving a rating of 85% at the army course in Vancouver, Washington. At the time, only two other women in the country had made this qualification.

Christofferson traveled to New York in 1928, where she took part in a police shooting competition and scored 96 out of 100 possible points. Police captain Ralph Micelli called her "the best woman revolver shot I have ever seen."

== Aviation career ==
Christofferson was one of twenty-four Portland women who founded an Oregon chapter of the Women's National Aeronautic Association in 1930. She was the first president of the chapter, with stunt pilot Dorothy Hester serving as vice president. In 1931, she was appointed to the Oregon state board of aeronautics.

In 1931, Christofferson enrolled in a flying class run by the National Solo Flying Corporation. The company operated a Portland airport soon to be dedicated in honor of her late husband, and Christofferson wanted to fly at the dedication ceremony. She made her first flight on July 31, 1931 with instructor Charles Hanst. Christofferson, who was used to earlier plane types, remarked that "I would have felt more at home and would have done much better, if I had had a wheel instead of a stick to control the plane." On October 31, 1931, she spoke at the dedication, then flew alone over the airfield, dropping flowers from the plane. It was the fifteenth anniversary of Silas Christofferson's death.

In February 1932, Christofferson set out on an expedition to Alaska with pilot William Graham. The two were hoping to find the lost steamship SS Baychimo, which held a cargo of valuable furs. En route to Atlin, British Columbia, head winds and lack of fuel forced them to make an emergency landing. They spent ten days camped on an uncharted lake, enduring temperatures as low as -40 degrees Fahrenheit, before they were rescued by pilot Stanley McMillan. Though they did not find the ship, Christofferson staked two gold claims in the Kougarok district near Nome.

Christofferson returned to Portland on June 26, 1932. There, her friends and family welcomed her back at the Swan Island Airport. In July`1932, she obtained her private pilot's license. She set out again for Alaska in October 1932, and stayed there, panning for gold, for the next three years.

Christofferson returned to Portland in December 1935. She was accompanied by fellow prospector Isador Fix, who she had worked with closely in Alaska. Sometime before 1939, Fix and Christofferson married.

Edna Christofferson died in a hospital in Vancouver, Washington on March 8, 1945. Her age was recorded as 64, though an 1886 birthdate would have made her 58 years old at the time of her death.

== See also ==
- Amelia Earhart
- Dorothy Hester Stenzel
- Hazel Ying Lee
- Leah Hing
- Eddy Jerman
- Lincoln Beachey
- Evelyn Waldren
