= Walter Edward Kittel =

American aviator

Walter Edward Kittel, often known as Walter Edwards, (1880–1922) was an early pioneer in American aviation in the Pacific Northwest.

== Biography ==
On August 10, 1912, upon being granted temporary route #673001 by the United States Post Office Department, Kittel/Edwards flew the first officially sanctioned airmail flight in the Pacific Northwest when he flew mail from Waverly Golf Links in Oregon to his home base at the Vancouver Barracks in Vancouver, Washington.

Using the same aircraft used earlier that year by Silas Christofferson to take off from the roof of the Multnomah Hotel in Portland, Oregon, Kittel/Edwards delivered 5,000 pieces of mail, each postmarked with a special commemorative cancellation, to the Vancouver, Washington postmaster that same day. In what would be recorded as "US pioneer air mail /light #48", the flight was the first interstate airmail run in the United States.

== Walter Edwards / Walter Edward Kittel ==
In 1912, from a Seattle hotel, Kittel issued a statement regarding his decision to change his name to Walter Edwards in which he criticized members of his social circle and their idleness as his reasons for becoming estranged with his family.

== See also ==
- EAA Aviation Museum
