= Waldren =

Waldren is a surname. Notable people with the surname include:

- Dino Waldren (born 1991), American rugby union player
- Evelyn Waldren (1908–1986), American pilot
- Murray Waldren, Australian journalist, editor, and writer

== See also ==
- Walden (name)
- Walgren
