= Henry Wong =

Henry Wong may refer to:

- Henry Wong (politician), Hong Kong businessman and politician
- Henry Hope Wong, Chinese-American aviator
- Henry Vernon Wong, Jamaican-American physicist
- Henry Wong (Digimon Tamers), a character from the Digimon Tamers anime

== See also ==
- Harry Wong, educator, educational speaker and author
- Harry Hon Hai Wong, inventor of instant noodles
