= Walgren =

Walgren is a surname of Swedish origin. Notable people with the surname include:

- Doug Walgren (born 1940), American attorney and politician
- Gordon Walgren (1933–2018), American lawyer and politician

== See also ==
- Wahlgren
- Waldren
