= Dorothy Hester Stenzel =

American aviator and stunt pilot

- Born: Dorothy Hester; September 14, 1910; Milwaukie, Oregon, U.S.
- Died: February 25, 1991 (aged 80); Bend, Oregon, U.S.
- Occupation: Pilot
- Spouse(s): Robert Dent Hofer, Franklin H. Stenzel
- Children: Sabine Hofer Ladd, Dorothy Hofer Vandehey

Dorothy Hester Hofer Stenzel (September 14, 1910 – February 25, 1991) was an American aviator and stunt pilot. She had a groundbreaking stunt aerobatics career, often performing as "Princess-Kick-a-Hole-in-the-Sky", and later opened her own flight school in Cornelius, Oregon.

== Childhood ==
Stenzel was born in Milwaukie, Oregon, in 1910. She attended Ardenwald Elementary School, St. Agatha School, and Milwaukie High School. As a child, she remembered chasing after a hot-air balloon in an attempt to get a ride. She was the second-youngest of five sisters.

== Pilot training ==
A week before Stenzel turned seventeen, she learned that she could get a plane ride near the Swan Island Municipal Airport in Portland. She took a street car into Portland, then walked to a small airport "just south of Swan Island". As she neared the airport, she began to run, afraid that "they were either going to crack up or run out of gas before I could get there." She loved her plane ride, and remarked to the pilot, "If I was a boy, I'd certainly learn to fly!" The pilot encouraged her to sign up for lessons, but the cost was prohibitively high. To start flying lessons, which cost 25 dollars an hour (equivalent to $463 today,) she would first have to pass a 250-dollar flight school ground course.

Stenzel learned that she could make 100 dollars by making a parachute jump, and asked Tex Rankin, head of the Rankin Flying School, if he would take her up. After he declined, she found another pilot to carry her at an airshow in Medford, Oregon. She was initially too frightened to jump and clung tightly to the wing of the plane. After circling the jump site four times, Stenzel fell at last. She believed the pilot had hit her hands with a fire extinguisher to get her loose. Though she had been terrified before the jump, Stenzel recalled decades later that she had loved drifting down to earth. However, when the incident was just two years behind her, she said "I'll never do another one unless I have to."

When Rankin heard the story, he offered Stenzel four more parachuting jobs, which gave her enough money to enroll in the ground course. However, when she graduated from the class, she discovered Rankin's mixed opinion of female aviators. "He mentioned all the things the boys could do," she said, "and then he looked at me sitting in the front row and said, 'Oh, and the girls can work in the office.'"

Stenzel challenged him to ride alongside her and, in her words, "pick holes in my flying." Rankin was impressed by her performance and began teaching her stunts. She took lessons on weekends and after working eight-hour shifts as an inspector at a wool mill. According to Rankin, Stenzel spent her little remaining time "learning everything she could about airplanes, reading books, working on airplanes and motors". One of her fellow students was Robert Dent Hofer, whom she later married.

== Stunt pilot career ==
=== Early performances ===
Stenzel became a popular feature in Rankin's weekly air shows. Despite her newfound celebrity, she was shy in front of large crowds, and tried to avoid them. "I'd get way down low and work in about their knees, [ending] up behind the crowd," she remembered.

Despite Stenzel's discomfort with crowds, she performed in front of 25,000 people at the 1930 Portland Rose Festival. Stenzel was one of three female pilots in the show: the others were Mary Riddle and Edith Foltz. During the same show, Tex Rankin unsuccessfully tried to fly an upside-down figure eight, a feat which Stenzel would achieve later that year.

=== 1930: Northwest tour and first outside loop ===
On June 22, 1930, Stenzel became the first woman to complete an upside-down outside spin. After two failures, she took a two-hour break, then returned to the air and finished the stunt correctly.

One week later, on June 29, Stenzel became the first woman to complete an outside loop. At sunset, with 3,000 spectators watching her, she flew to an elevation of 6,000 feet. After three failed attempts, she made five successful outside loops. On her third, she dove "upside down for 3,000 feet" at nearly 200 miles per hour.

After Stenzel's fourth loop, Rankin claimed that "if she tries to better that one, she will have to do some flying." Right after this declaration, Stenzel did yet another outside loop.

On July 29, Stenzel joined a fleet of fifty airplanes and embarked on a tour of Oregon, Washington, and Idaho. Edith Foltz seems to have been the only other female pilot on the tour. Over less than two weeks, Stenzel performed stunts in twenty-two cities, flying a yellow and red Great Lakes biplane with a 90 horsepower motor. Her sister, Helen Hester, traveled with her. In Springfield, Oregon, she performed outside loops, barrel rolls, "elephant rolls", and "almost every other kind of an aerial maneuver" in front of 6,000 onlookers. The Eugene Register claimed that after this performance, local security "had great difficulty in keeping the spectators from crowding forward and fully crushing her and her small machine." The tour concluded on August 7.

After returning to Portland, Stenzel broke another record on September 21, when she became the first woman to complete an upside-down spiral and an upside-down figure eight. On her first two attempts at the figure eight, her motor stalled before she could complete her second loop. The third try, however, was a success.

Over the course of 1930, Stenzel performed in front of half a million people. On November 29, the Women's International Association of Aeronautics awarded her a bracelet bearing their emblem. The bracelet was given to her by Grace Hay Drummond-Hay, the first woman to cross the Atlantic Ocean in a zeppelin.

Stenzel belonged to Portland's chapter of the National Women's Aeronautic Association, which was led by Edna Christofferson and included noted pilot Edith Foltz.

=== 1931: Outside loop record ===
Stenzel practiced her flying daily over the winter, and in February, traveled to California. On February 22, she set the new women's record for outside loops, completing five in a row over the Grand Central Airport in Glendale. On the same trip, Rankin completed 72 consecutive outside loops in 88 minutes. In March, Stenzel set a new record, increasing to 23 consecutive outside loops at a benefit show for the Red Cross.

By May, Stenzel had developed several new maneuvers, including the "Hester roll", created by accident. The Oregonian's aviation editor, Webster A. Jones, described it: "She places the plane in a vertical bank to the left, reverses suddenly into position, completes half of a snap roll to the right, and flies away upside down. In the air it looks like a question mark."

By this time, Stenzel could also complete "an outside loop, upside down spin, upside down figure eight, vertical rolls, double barrel rolls, slow aileron rolls, perpendicular whip stalls, 1 1/2 snap rolls, a 1 1/2 snap roll upside down, an upside down barrel roll, and several others." In total, she could do 31 different stunts.

In May, Stenzel performed in the first annual Omaha Air Show in Nebraska. She set yet another record by flying 69 consecutive outside loops, 62 of which were deemed perfectly rounded by observers from the National Aeronautic Association (NAA). This record would remain unbroken by any woman for 57 years. She had wanted to break Rankin's 72-loop record, but ran out of fuel before she could reach it. Stenzel was laughing when she landed and refused the ambulance that had been called for her. Instead, she walked away for a 90-minute nap, then returned to perform more stunts.

Stenzel made 56 inverted snap rolls in a row, setting a new world record for both men and women. Noted aviator Al Williams said of her performance:

"There's a mere slip of a girl doing stunts that chiefs of the army and navy air units of the nation said could not be done a year ago and the maneuvers the greatest fliers in the world would not have attempted three years ago- and she is not doing it in a $30,000 military plane with a powerful motor, but she is doing it in a light, cheap airplane with a four-cylinder engine at only 90 horsepower."

Stenzel and Rankin flew to Cleveland, Ohio to receive a plane from the Great Lakes Aircraft Company. It was presented to her by Robert Hofer and the B.F. Goodrich Company. The plane was designed specifically for Stenzel and meant to be flown upside down "with the same ease as in a normal position of flight." Described as "trim, light-brown and crimson with crimson wings", it had a 90 horsepower motor and weighed less than 1,000 pounds. After the ceremony, Rankin, Stenzel, and Hofer flew back west together. Upon her return, she attended a reception in her honor, which was organized by the National Women's Aeronautic Association and drew 1,000 guests.

Stenzel was a key performer in the 1931 Portland Rose Festival on June 12. Before an audience of over 20,000 people, she did eleven stunts, including six never before completed by a female pilot.

After her performance in the Omaha Air Show, Stenzel was invited to the National Air Races in Cleveland, Ohio. She was the first woman to perform stunts at a national air show and the only pilot, male or female, to perform every day of the show. During each performance, she flew for 15 to 30 minutes. Also taking part in the races was Robert Hofer, Stenzel's former classmate. Stenzel's act was sponsored by the B.F. Goodrich Company.

The races began on August 29. Stenzel hoped to break the men's record of 125 consecutive outside loops on Labor Day, but was unsuccessful. The Tennessean described a positive reaction to her flights:

"She had the women at the races ga-ga every afternoon. She was the only woman stunt artist on the bill, and after watching men pilots go nuts with airplanes in the clouds for a couple of hours the women in the stands nearly applauded their heads off when Dorothy would put on her show."

In an interview after she landed, Stenzel explained her passion for flying. "Why do I love it- this risking my life? Because up there it's so free. Just think, in the sky nobody can tell you what to do. With a good plane there isn't anything you can't do."

=== 1932: Flight instructor ===
Stenzel received her transport pilot's license in 1932. In April, Stenzel flew in the New Orleans Carnival of the Air. Later that month, she performed in an air show to raise money for the Goodfellow employment bureau in Shreveport, Louisiana.

Stenzel became a flight instructor for the Union Avenue Flying Service, a flying school "and air taxi service" organized by Tex Rankin and his brothers Dudley and Richard. Just one month after the flying service was announced in The Oregonian, Dudley Rankin died from injuries sustained while working on his plane. On October 10, Rankin Field was dedicated in his honor: Stenzel and Tex Rankin both performed stunts at the ceremony. Also in 1932, Stenzel founded her own flight school, which she operated for the next two years.

== Marriage to Robert Hofer ==
Stenzel married Robert Dent Hofer on June 30, 1934. The couple had two daughters, Sabine and Dorothy. Stenzel quit flight instruction and stunt flying when she married. In 1981, she recalled that "I had watched other women try to carry on a business and be married, too, and decided that I wasn't smart enough to be a good wife and keep up that kind of flying." The couple frequently traveled by plane, and had their own airstrip outside their home in Banks, Oregon.

== Gravity testing ==
Stenzel was the first woman to undergo the U.S. Navy's gravity test for pilots. Although 6 Gs of force was considered "rough", Stenzel was able to endure 8.6 Gs.

== Joann Osterud ==
In 1984, Stenzel was guest of honor at the Creswell Air Fair in Creswell, Oregon. There, she saw stunt pilot Joann Osterud fly, and asked her when she was going to try breaking Stenzel's outside loop record. On July 13, 1989, Osterud completed 206 consecutive loops at the North Bend, Oregon, Air Show, also beating the men's record of 180 loops. Stenzel came to the show to watch. She said that "I've had my day, and I think it's time for someone to have theirs."

== Later life ==
Stenzel flew less often in her later years, lamenting the stricter regulations on air travel and "preferring to spend time with her five grandchildren". She remarried to Franklin H. Stenzel, and spent her retirement in a house near Banks, Oregon. She died of lung cancer on February 25, 1991, in a hospital in Bend, Oregon.

== Recognition ==
The Oregon legislature passed a resolution in 1985 commending her "for her courage, her determination and her achievements in aviation."
