= Milo Burcham =

American aviator

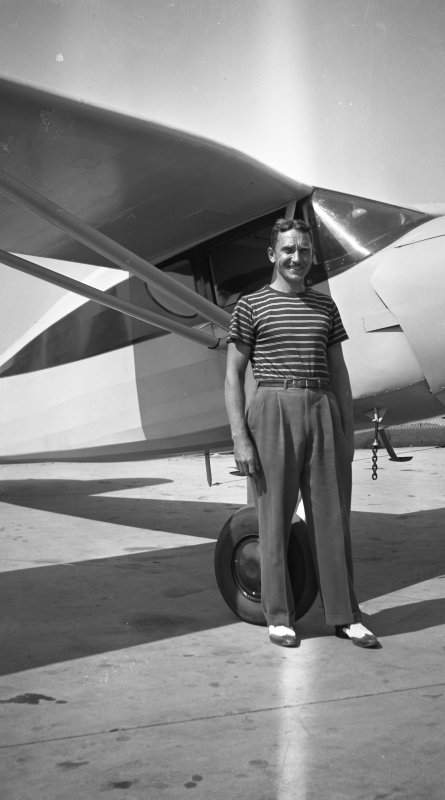
- Born: May 24, 1903; Cadiz, Indiana, U.S.
- Died: October 20, 1944 (aged 41); Burbank, California, U.S.
- Cause of death: Aircraft crash
- Resting place: Forest Lawn Cemetery, Glendale, California
- Education: O'Donnell School of Aviation
- Known for: Stunt pilot, airshow pilot, test pilot; inverted flight endurance record; first flight of the Constellation; first flight of the XP-80

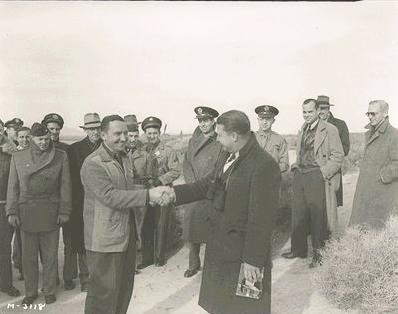
Clarence “Kelly” Johnson (right) congratulates Milo Burcham on the successful first flight of the XP-80 Shooting Star.

Milo Garrett Burcham (May 24, 1903 – October 20, 1944) was an American aviator. He worked as a stunt pilot, airshow pilot, and test pilot.

Burcham was born in Cadiz, Indiana, and grew up in Whittier, California, in the eastern Los Angeles basin. Burcham sold burglar alarms of his own design to finance flying lessons from the O'Donnell School of Aviation in Long Beach, California, where he became chief instructor. In 1933, Burcham and Lt. Tito Falconi of the Italian Air Service competed in setting inverted flight endurance records. Burcham's flight of 4 h 5 min 22 s flying in circles over Long Beach, California that December was not broken until July 24, 1991, when U.S. airshow pilot Joann Osterud set a new world's record of 4 h 38 min 10 s. In 1936, Burcham flew his Boeing 100 to the World's Aerobatic Championship at the National Air Races in Los Angeles.

In 1941, Burcham joined Lockheed as a production test pilot and spent a year as chief pilot of Lockheed's operations in England. He became chief engineering test pilot a few years later, and in that capacity was served as copilot on the first flight of the Constellation on January 8, 1943. On January 9, 1944, he turned the first flight of Lulu-Belle, the XP-80 prototype, into a thrilling low-level airshow before a crowd of military and civilian VIPs at Muroc Army Air Base (now Edwards AFB).

On October 20, 1944, Burcham was flying the third production prototype YP-80 from Lockheed Air Terminal in Burbank, California. The engine flamed-out on takeoff due to a main fuel pump failure and the airplane crashed one mile west of the terminal, killing him.

He is buried in Forest Lawn Cemetery in Glendale, California.
