= Rose Lok (pilot) =

First female Chinese-American pilot in New England

- Born: 1912; China
- Died: 1978; California, U.S.
- Known for: Aviation, First Chinese-American female pilot

Rose Lok (1912–1978) was the first female Chinese American pilot in New England.

== Early life ==
Lok was born in 1912 in China. Lok emigrated to the U.S. with her family as a child. She grew up on Tyler Street in Boston, Massachusetts, near Denison House, where Amelia Earhart was a social worker in the 1920s. At 18, Lok took up flying. Earhart may have inspired Lok to take up flying.

== Career ==
The Chinese Patriotic Flying Corps was formed in the early 1930s to assist China in its defense against Japanese aggression. The pilots were all trained at East Boston Airport (later Logan Airport) by Francis P. Kendall of the Curtiss-Wright Flying Service. Local Chinese-American merchants sponsored the group and bought them an airplane, a "Curtiss Fledgling", emblazoned with the Chinese flag and the name of the organization in English and Chinese. Lok joined the corps in 1932. She obtained her pilot's license from the U.S. Department of Commerce that same year.

As the only female flyer in the group, Lok became a local celebrity and made national headlines. A Boston Globe reporter writing about her first solo flight in May 1932 referred to her as "a winsome Chinese maid". On June 12, 1932, at a Chinatown celebration honoring the flyers, Lok gave a "stirring address on the need of airplanes in China with Chinese pilots". In 1933 she was mentioned in the Ninety-Niner (journal of the Ninety-Nines, an international group of women pilots) along with Hazel Ying Lee and Katherine Sui Fun Cheung.

Lok was one of a handful of Chinese-American women who earned their pilot's licenses during the 1930s, along with Hazel Ying Lee, Leah Hing, Hilda Yen, and Lee Ya-Ching. She was the first female Chinese-American pilot in New England, and the first to solo at Logan Airport. She was memorialized by the Ninety-Nines with a tree at the International Forest of Friendship, and is remembered on the Boston Women's Heritage Trail.

== Personal life ==
Rose Lok married Edward N. Jung in Boston in 1935. She died on May 22, 1978.
