= Evergreen North–South Airpark =

Airport in Washington, United States

- IATA: none; ICAO: none; FAA LID: WA81

Summary
- Airport type: Private
- Owner: North/South Airpark Association
- Serves: Vancouver, Washington
- Elevation AMSL: 312 ft (95 m)
- Coordinates: 45°37′52″N 122°31′51″W
- Interactive map of Evergreen North–South Airpark

Runways
Direction	Length		Surface
Direction	ft	m	Surface
18/36	1,700	518	Turf
- Source: Federal Aviation Administration

Evergreen North–South Airpark (FAA LID: WA81) is a private-use airport located six nautical miles (11 km) east-northeast of the central business district of Vancouver, in Clark County, Washington, United States. It is owned by North/South Airpark Association.

The airpark was established in 1968, adjoining Evergreen Field which closed in 2006. After a four-year legal battle with a neighboring commercial property owner and the county planning commission, the airpark owners won the right to continue flight operations in 1997.

== Facilities and aircraft ==
Evergreen North–South Airpark is at an elevation of 312 feet (95 m) above mean sea level. It has one runway designated 18/36 with a turf surface measuring 1,700 by 75 feet (518 x 23 m).

As of May 18, 2023, there were 17 single-engine aircraft based at this airport.

== See also ==
- Evergreen Field
