= Joann Osterud =

American pilot

Joann Osterud (November 14, 1945 - March 12, 2017) was an American pilot who flew for commercial airlines as well as stunt performances.

== Biography ==
Joann Osterud was born in Minneapolis, Minnesota on November 14, 1945 to parents Kenneth Osterud (1914-1994) and Dorothy (Wellington) Osterud (1919-1971). She had an older brother and a younger sister. Her father taught biology at the University of Minnesota from 1941 until 1948, when the family relocated to Seattle, Washington, for Kenneth Osterud's teaching post at the University of Washington.

She married John Gregory Hull (1939-2012) in Seattle on April 15, 1971 and they divorced in July 1973. On November 5, 1978, she married fellow pilot Robert H. Nottke (1939-2012) in California; they divorced in 1984.

Osterud was a longtime animal rescuer, specifically cats and tortoises, and a member of Concerned People for Animals.

She died of natural causes on March 12, 2017 at age 71.

=== Education and early life ===
Osterud graduated from Roosevelt High School in Seattle in 1964, and then attended Reed College in Portland, OR, graduating in 1968 with a degree in political science. She was a member of Phi Beta Kappa and wrote her senior thesis on science and public policy, but discovered a love of physics late in college while working on the installation of the Reed reactor, and was one of the original students licensed to operate it. During Osterud's summers, as well as the year after graduation, she worked at Seattle's Pacific Science Center as the Science Education Coordinator. Her boss was Dr. Dixie Lee Ray who would later be Washington's first female governor, but who was then a colleague of Osterud's father at the University of Washington.

Osterud also briefly attended Massachusetts Institute of Technology, working on a graduate degree in science and public policy, but was disappointed with the school and left after one year.

=== Flight and world records ===
Osterud started taking flying lessons in 1968 from a female instructor at Hillsboro Airport, just outside Portland, Oregon, and earned her pilot's license while at MIT as a grad student. She worked briefly as a flight instructor for Bell Air Service in Seattle, before being hired as both a secretary and pilot for Lynden Transport in Alaska. Osterud's first appearance as a stunt pilot at an airshow appears to have been in 1974 at the Abbotsford Air Show, flying clipped wing Cub aerobatics.

In 1975, she became the first female pilot employed by Alaska Airlines, starting out as a co-pilot on Alaska's DHC Twin Otter turboprop out of Juneau. This made her the sixth female commercial pilot in the country. After flying for Alaska for three years, Osterud became the fourth woman graduate of the United Airlines training school, and in May 1978, was hired by United Airlines, becoming the sixth female pilot to fly for the airline. During her employment with Alaska Airlines, she participated in the investigation into the cause of an Alaska Airlines 727 crash at Juneau on September 4, 1971. Her research was key to finding the elusive cause of an error in VOR station propagation which resulted in the aircraft descending into terrain.

Despite her time spent flying for major airlines, Osterud worked steadily as a stunt pilot, working at airshows across the U.S. and Canada most weekends between March and November. She bought her first plane in 1976, a Stephens Akro plane built by Gerry Zimmerman in 1971, which was the first amateur-built Akro to fly. Osterud used the Akro for stunt performance maneuvers like hammerhead turns, tailslides, and lomcevaks (tumbling end over end) in the air show circuit. She donated the Akro to the Museum of Flight in 1994.

Osterud almost set her first record in 1987, where she was supposed to be the first woman to compete in the Reno Air Races. A technical requirement kept her from competing during the weekend in a 40 year old British plane called Blind Man's Bluff. The plane had been converted to burn methanol, and because of this, it did not pass race checkout.

At an airshow on July 13, 1989 in North Bend, Oregon, Osterud set her first world flight record, flying 208 outside loops in her Sorrell Biplane Supernova. The plane was 21 feet long with a 23-foot wingspan, and topped out at 170 MPH. It had a 230-horsepower engine and a nitrous oxide injection system for an extra boost. Osterud modified it with straps to hold her feet to the pedals, and she trained for the time upside down with a special harness that allowed her to hang upside down for long periods of time. Previous record holder Dorothy Stenzel set the record of 62 outside loops in 1931 and, after seeing Osterud perform at an airshow, encouraged her to break her record. Stenzel commented to Sports Illustrated, "I believed it was well past time the record was broken… She's a smooth flyer and I didn't think she'd tear her wings off." The 208 outside loops took her 2 hours, 4 minutes, 38 seconds, and not only broke Stenzel's record of 62 outside loops, but also the unofficial men's record of 180 outside loops, which was set by Hal McClain in the 1980s. Osterud also used the record-breaking stunt to raise money for United Way of Southeastern Oregon, allowing people to sponsor individual loops. She raised $1,364.67, and would have quit at 200 loops, but one of her favorite Eagles songs was playing, so she kept going.

Osterud next set two records at once on July 24, 1991, for both the longest flight upside down and the longest flight upside down in one stretch, flying for 4 hours and 38 minutes over 658 miles in her Ultimate 10-300S biplane between Vancouver BC and Vanderhoof BC. She was scheduled to perform in the 1990 Vanderhoof Air Show, so decided to try her hand at breaking Milo Burcham's 1933 record. She had previously attempted the flight in 1990, but had to end the flight early due to an engine oil leak. Burcham flew 4 hours, 5 minutes, 22 seconds flying upside down from Long Beach to San Diego and back in a Boeing 100 where he had inverted the engine. The records were part publicity stunt for the Vanderhoof Air Show, partly to fundraise for the Canadian Air Cadets, and also to prove that she could do it. Osterud upgraded her biplane with six fuel tanks, specialized oil and electrical systems, special seat belts and drinking tubes, the last two for making the long flight more comfortable. She had the same problems she always did with her body on her inverted flights: painful leg cramps, facial swelling, eyes swelling, and head congestion. During the record-setting flight, she was accompanied by five other planes, including an official observer from the Canadian Federation Aeronautique Internationale and another to navigate for her. "The world looks real weird upside down," she said. "The normal points of reference just aren't there." As of 1991, she was flying 20-25 airshows a year as well as flying for United Airlines, and compared the difference between the two types of planes as "the difference between driving a Cadillac and riding a dirt bike."

=== Last flight and career ending accident ===
Osterud's last stunt flight ended abruptly, when she crashed during an airshow at the MCAS Yuma Airshow in Yuma, Arizona, at the MCAS, Yuma International Airport on April 11, 1997. She was flying her Ultimate 10-300S biplane in a performance at the airshow she called "Ring of Fire", which she had performed numerous times over the years both in the United States and abroad. The stunt centered on a giant ring of flames at center stage of the show. She would make multiple passes through the flaming ring, and on the last pass, flew upside down and cut a ribbon suspended between two poles with the tail of her plane, while the plane was 10–20 feet off the ground. According to the NTSB accident report, Osterud had personally chosen the location for the poles and ribbon, which was just to the south of the runway over old asphalt and concrete. This meant that her path was free of any obstacles and would parallel the runway. She planned to cut the ribbon while flying inverted on her third pass, and then land. She ended up flying at dusk, and then had to fly directly into the setting sun before turning around for her last pass, which was the one that was upside down. "I remember the turn-around at the west end, rolling inverted [and] establishing my sight picture for the run-in. However, the next few seconds are a total blank in my memory. I can remember the sound of the impact, but my recollection of a visual picture resumes only with the sparks created by the inverted slide." Osterud crashed into the runway while upside down on the third pass, totaling the plane, but was able to walk away from the crash unhurt. She apparently went back to the grandstand covered in soot, dirt and mud in her hair and apologized to the crowd for crashing. Her insurance covered the remaining debt on the plane, but did not leave enough for her to buy another plane. This crash ended her stunt career. The NTSB inspector found no mechanical or engine problems with the plane and cited "the pilot's failure to maintain adequate vertical clearance from the runway, while flying inverted" as well as "the light conditions at dusk, and the pilot's lack of visual ques [sic] due to the light conditions" as factors relating to the accident.
