= Bruceport, Washington =

Ghost town in Washington (state)

- Ghost town
- Location within Washington (state) Location within the United States
- Coordinates: 46°40′45″N 123°54′01″W
- Country: United States
- State: Washington
- County: Pacific
- Elevation: 30 ft (9 m)
- Time zone: UTC-8 (Pacific (PST))
  - Summer (DST): UTC-7 (PDT)
- Area code(s): 360, 564
- GNIS feature ID: 1510843

Bruceport is an extinct settlement in Pacific County, in the U.S. state of Washington.

== History ==
The settlement was founded in December 1851 by the crew of the schooner Robert Bruce, which had burned on Willapa Bay while transporting oysters. The settlement, initially named Bruceville in 1854, grew into a trading post for oysters and was settled. From 1854 to 1860, Bruceville was the county seat of Chehalis County (later Grays Harbor County) and had a population of 25 families by the 1870s.

A post office called Bruceport was established in 1858, and remained in operation until 1895. The community was named after Robert the Bruce, King of the Scots.
