= Leah Hing =

Chinese aviator

- Born: September 25, 1907; Portland, Oregon, U.S.
- Died: July 21, 2001 (aged 93); Portland, Oregon, U.S.
- Burial place: River View Cemetery Portland, Multnomah County, Oregon, U.S.
- Occupation: Pilot
- Known for: First Chinese American female aviator

Leah Hing (1907–2001) was the first Chinese American woman to earn her pilot's license. Trained by Tex Rankin, an early aviation pioneer at Pearson Field in Vancouver, Washington, she received her pilot's license in 1934. Later she became an instrument mechanic during World War II at a Portland air base.

== Childhood ==
Hing grew up near Salem, Oregon, and spent her school breaks working on her father's hops ranch. Her mother, Ah Sin Hing, had emigrated from Canton, China: her father, Lee Hing, was born in Oregon. She had two sisters, Lily and Ruth, and one brother, Peter. When she was five years old, her father bought a house in the Ladd's Addition neighborhood of Portland. Hing would live in Ladd's Addition for the rest of her life. Hing was a member of the Tanda Campfire Girls and president of the Portland Chinese Girls' Club. Her family were members of the Holt Presbyterian Church. She attended Atkinson Elementary School, Stephens Middle School, Washington High School, and the Northwestern Business College. In 1927, she danced in the Portland Rose Festival alongside seventeen other Chinese-American girls, including her lifelong friend Lillian Lang and future pilots Hazel Ying Lee and Virginia Wong. Hing was one of the first Chinese-American women in Portland hired as an elevator operator.

== Vaudeville tour ==
In 1927, Hing and five other young women founded the Portland Chinese Girls' Orchestra under the umbrella of the Portland Chinese Girls' Club. Hing played the saxophone, and was accompanied by cymbals, drums, xylophone, trombone, and banjo. Lillian Lang and Virginia Wong were also members. After three years of local performances, they joined The Honorable Wu's Vaudeville Troupe and took their show on the road. The band allowed them to travel America at a time when few jobs were open to Chinese-American women. At the time they left, they ranged in age from eighteen to twenty-two. They spent a year touring the U.S. and Canada, but only played one song, "Happy Days Are Here Again." Family friend Patsy Lee said that they "just lived hand-to-mouth, but they were able to travel." While they were playing in Chicago, Hing took her first airplane ride at a school for Chinese-American aviators. She returned to Portland determined to become a pilot.

== Aviation career ==
=== Rankin Flying School ===
Hing managed the Chinese Tea Garden restaurant, where her father was a stockholder. While working there, she met Tex Rankin, who recruited her for his flying school. Rankin had taught Native American pilot Mary Riddle and was interested in creating "a 'rainbow', all-female stunt team", though the group never materialized.

In March 1932, Hing had her first flying lesson. According to her teacher, Tex Rankin, she was a remarkably quick learner. He shared more details in the Oregonian:

"The first lesson consists of control exercises; the use of the rudder in the extremes, full rudder to the right and full rudder to the left; the use of the allerons, banking the ship vertically to the left and then to the right, and the use of the elevators, diving and zooming the ship several times. The trick is to learn to use all three together. This Miss Hing did after only ten minutes, and at the end of 15 minutes she pulled the throttle back and put the ship into a glide, landing it with little difficulty. I coached her through the speaking tube, but she did everything right. That's unusual the first time for anyone."

=== Chinese-American Flying School ===
Hing, who had family in China, wanted to become an aviation instructor for Chinese women. "I believe that women can learn to fly as easily as men," she told reporters, "and that eventually there will be just as many women flying as men." It was her opinion that "a country sees only through the eyes of its fliers." After the Japanese invasion of Manchuria in 1931, Portland became the site of a Chinese-American flying school, with the aim of training students to become fighter pilots in the Second Sino-Japanese War. Hing wanted to attend, but her father forbade it. However, he did allow her to buy her own aircraft, a 1931 B-5 Kinner Fleet biplane, which she used to perform in airshows up and down the West Coast. She once made a surprise visit to her brother and sister-in-law's farm in Aurora, Oregon, landing her plane in their wheat field. By 1942, she had accumulated over 200 hours of flying time.

=== Plane crashes ===
Hing once collided with a pothole on the runway, flipping her plane onto its back, and had to have it rebuilt. In 1936, Lacey Murrow, brother of Edward R. Murrow, crashed his plane into Leah's while trying to land. Her plane, which was parked and unoccupied, sustained 500 dollars' worth of damage. The Murrow brothers bought Leah's plane: she spent the money on a Travel Air plane once owned by stunt pilot Dorothy Hester Stenzel. In 1937, she crashed her plane while landing at the Boeing Field airport in Washington. The plane was severely damaged, and Hing and her passenger received minor injuries.

=== World War II ===
During World War II, Hing worked at the Portland Air Base, checking and repairing flight instruments. She also enlisted in the West Coast Civil Air Patrol to fly reconnaissance missions. After the internment of Japanese Americans, Hing and many other Chinese-Americans began wearing buttons identifying them as Chinese. Hing recalled that "we were very proud, and we didn't want to get mixed up with the Japanese."

=== The Ninety-Nines ===
Hing joined the Oregon section of The Ninety-Nines when the chapter was revived in 1941. She served as secretary-treasurer and notified members of upcoming meetings.

=== Aero Club ===
Hing and Lang found jobs at the Aero Club of Oregon. Hing worked there as a switchboard operator and hat check girl until she retired in her sixties. A 1936 Oregonian article said she "knows every hat that was ever bounced upon the counter."

== Community involvement ==
Hing helped immigrants navigate the citizenship process. Patsy Lee said that "she drilled them for months before they took their tests. And she gave them other information. Instead of going to a lawyer, people would go to her."

Hing was general manager of the Chung Wah Hoopers, Portland Chinatown's all-girl basketball team, which played an annual benefit game to raise money for poor and elderly Chinese-Americans to buy food. In 1932, she and Lang assisted with a reception for a medical missionary traveling to China.

== Personal life ==
Hing's sister, Lily, died on March 10, 1933. Her father died in 1956, at the age of 85. Her mother died a year later.

Hing served as a bridesmaid in her brother's 1934 wedding to Gertrude Johnsang. She herself turned down several marriage proposals, saying she "liked her independence." In addition to her aviation career, she "sold insurance, had her own watch-repair business and was a professional photographer." She traveled internationally and across the United States with her parents and Lang. Hing and Lang were well known for the parties they threw in Ladd's Addition.

Historian Jackie Peterson described her as having "a remarkable ability to take in life and enjoy it." According to her sister-in-law, Gertrude Johnsang Hing:

"There was just something about her. She kept everyone laughing. And she had a lot of gumption. I don't think her parents were modern, but they couldn't hold her back. She was going to do what she wanted to do."

Hing died of cancer and heart failure in July 2001.

== Legacy ==
Hing is portrayed in a mural of female Oregon aviators at the Portland International Airport. Her story was featured in the Multnomah County Library's 2012 exhibit "Flying Tigers: Chinese American Aviators in Oregon, 1918-1945" and the Oregon Historical Society's 2016 exhibit, "Beyond the Gate". Hing's first plane is displayed in the Pearson Air Museum.

== See also ==
- Hazel Ying Lee
- Bessie Coleman
- Mary Riddle
- Dorothy Hester Stenzel
- Arthur Chin
- Henry Hope Wong
- Rose Lok
- Lee Ya-Ching
- Tex Rankin
