= Edith Foltz =

American aviator

Edith Magalis Foltz Stearns Grissom
- Born: Edith Magalis; August 17, 1902; Dallas, Texas, U.S.
- Died: June 27, 1956 (aged 53); Corpus Christi, Texas, U.S.
- Occupation: Pilot
- Spouse(s): Joseph Rathelle Foltz, Harold Dickinson Stearns
- Children: 2

Edith Magalis Foltz Stearns Grissom (August 17, 1902 – June 27, 1956) was the first female transport pilot in Oregon, the fifth female transport pilot in the United States, and the first female state governor of the National Aeronautic Association. For her work as a transport pilot in World War II, she received the King's Medal for Courage in the Cause of Freedom. By the time she died, she had logged over 5,000 hours of flying time.

== Early life ==
Edith Foltz was born Edith Magalis in Dallas, Texas. She had one brother, Cyrus Magalis. As a young woman, she studied to become a singer.

== Marriage to Joseph Foltz ==
Her first husband was Joseph Rathelle Foltz Jr., a celery farmer from Milwaukie, Oregon. They had two children, one of whom died shortly after birth.

== Aviation career ==
=== Training and commercial flights ===
Foltz was upset when her husband bought a barnstorming plane: she had wanted to use the money for new furniture. But after the plane's propeller broke, Foltz volunteered to take a new one out to the barnstorming circuit. She wound up staying to act as an usher and sell tickets. In 1931, Foltz explained to The Oregonian what happened next:

After four weeks of this, the pilot said to me, "I believe you could learn to fly." I laughed and said, "Never," for I didn’t want the fliers making fun of me: I had heard about fliers laughing at the girls who were trying to learn to fly at this time. He insisted, so the next day as we were waiting for passengers to arrive he suggested that I get in the pilot cockpit and he in the front and for me to fly the ship.

After 110 minutes' training, Foltz flew solo. She "overshot her first attempt at landing, undershot the second, but set in a perfect landing the third try". After 200 hours of practice, Foltz became the first woman in Oregon – and the fifth in the United States – with a transport pilot's license. She begain co-piloting a Bach tri-motored transport plane owned by the West Coast Air Transport corporation. This made her the first female pilot to fly regularly for a commercial airline. After the company was bought by Western Air Express she flew Bach, Fokker, and Ford tri-motors until West Coast Air Transport was bought by United.

=== Air derbies ===
In 1929, Foltz entered the first annual Women's Air Derby, nicknamed the Powder Puff Derby, in an experimental Eaglerock Bullet plane. The race began in Santa Monica, California, and ended in Cleveland, Ohio, with a $25,000 cash prize. The pilots set out on August 18.

On August 23, Foltz's landing gear was damaged. Foltz told reporters in Midland, Texas that she suspected her gear had been sabotaged. Foltz pointed to the damage of Claire Fahy's plane and the fire in Blanche Noyes's plane as other examples of possible sabotage, saying she suspected the husband of one of the derby entrants.

Foltz overshot the Cincinnati checkpoint, became lost, and eventually landed in a farmer's field, rolling almost up to his front door. Once the man got over his initial surprise, he invited her in for dinner. "I should have gone back [to the checkpoint]," Foltz said, "but the farmer said dinner was just ready and there was fried chicken. I stayed and went on to Cleveland". Though the detour caused some controversy, Foltz was ultimately awarded second place and $700 prize money. Foltz continued to place high in air derbies for the next three years.

=== Promoting aviation ===
Along with Edna Christofferson and Dorothy Hester, Foltz co-founded the Portland chapter of the Women's National Aeronautic Association. She served on the board of directors and was chairman of the junior division. In 1931, she was named governor of Oregon's chapter of the National Aeronautic Association and became the first woman nationwide to serve as a state governor in the NAA. Foltz was also president of the Pacific Northwest chapter of the Ninety-Nines.

Foltz designed and marketed a multipurpose flying and casual suit for women, called the Folzup. It consisted of "riding trousers with a skirt that can be opened from hem to waistline on both sides, lifted and buttoned at the shoulder to make a jumper". Foltz modeled the suit herself in air races and sports shops.

=== Airline management and marriage to Harry Stearns ===
By 1939, Foltz had married Harry Stearns. That year, the couple bought Oregon Airways, a small airline with routes across western Oregon. The airline was suspended during the war, and Foltz seems to have had no involvement with it after 1946. A 1946 Oregonian article listed Stearns as Foltz's 'late husband'.

=== World War II ===
During World War II, Foltz was a flight instructor at the Multnomah Flying Club on Swan Island. In 1941, she was recruited by Jacqueline Cochran to join the civilian Air Transport Auxiliary in Britain, where she rose to the rank of first officer. She served in Europe for three and a half years. During that time, she met several of the pilots she had trained back in the United States.

Foltz stated that she preferred the Air Transport Auxiliary to American organizations like the Women Airforce Service Pilots because the British men she worked with judged her by her skills and not her gender. She declared that "the English treated us with the utmost courtesy and consideration".

During her time in the Air Transport Auxiliary, Foltz was chased by a Nazi pilot and had to dive into a cloud to lose him. On another occasion, she was mistaken for an Axis buzz bomb and almost shot down by friendly fire. For her service to Britain, Foltz was awarded the King's Medal for Courage in the Cause of Freedom.

=== Post-war career and third marriage ===
After the war ended, Foltz became a real estate saleswoman in Portland, Oregon. By 1947, she had grown bored with the work and returned to flying, moving back to Texas to teach at the Irwin School of Flight in Corpus Christi.

On April 26, 1947, Foltz was married in Houston. Her husband was a rancher from Beeville, Texas. His last name was Grissom: his first name is unknown.

Foltz later became a primary flight instructor at the Naval Air Station Corpus Christi. She then taught instrument flying, using Link Trainer flight simulators. She continued to teach at the Naval base until the year of her death.

Foltz and her co-pilot, Pauline Glasson, came in fifth at the Transcontinental All-Women's Air Race in 1953. In 1954, she was one of three women from Corpus Christi to enter the Powder Puff Derby. She and her co-pilot, Joy Callahan, had dropped out by the first day of the race, but continued on the route, "flying along for fun".

After a brief illness, Foltz died on June 27, 1956.
