= Evergreen Field =

Coordinates: 45°37′12″N 122°31′39″W

Evergreen Field (closed 2006)
- IATA: none; ICAO: none; FAA LID: 59S

Summary
- Airport type: Public
- Owner: Olson Family Trust
- Location: Vancouver, Washington
- Elevation AMSL: 312 ft (95 m)
- Interactive map of Evergreen Field (closed 2006)

Runways
Direction	Length		Surface
Direction	ft	m	Surface
10L/28R	2,155	657	Asphalt
10R/28L	2,000	610	Turf
- Source: Federal Aviation Administration

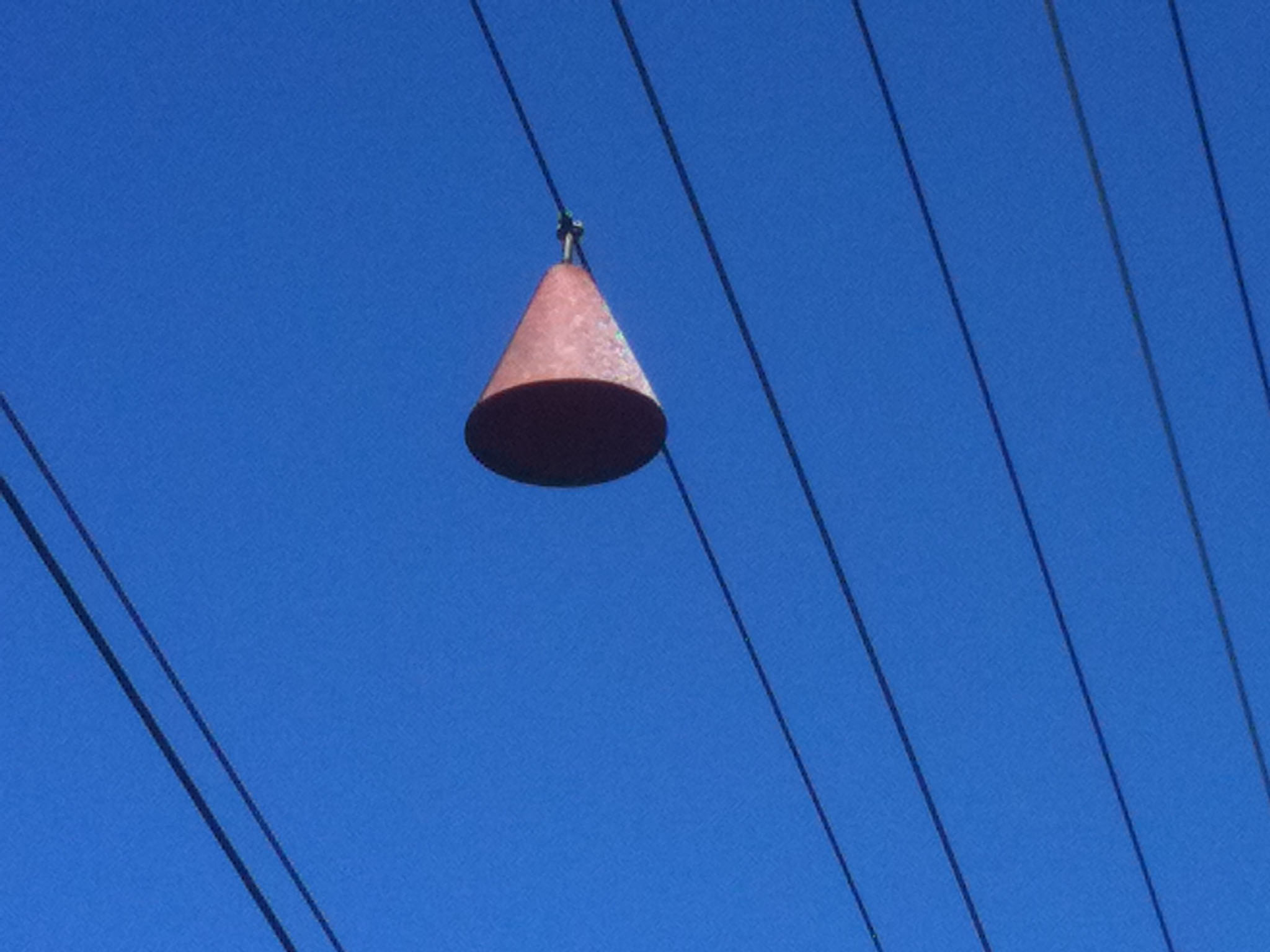
A remaining artifact of Evergreen Airfield in Vancouver, Washington. The orange cone served as a visual aid to pilots warning of power lines within the flight approach of the runway at Evergreen. Usually mounted in pairs, the other cone has apparently fallen off the wire. Located about 75 meters east of SE Park Crest Ave. on the south side of Mill Plain Blvd.

Evergreen Field (FAA LID: 59S), also known as Evergreen Airport, was a public-use airport located five miles (8.0 km) east of the central business district of Vancouver, a city in Clark County, Washington, United States. It was located northeast of the intersection of Southeast Mill Plain Boulevard & Southeast 136th Avenue.

The airport was established in August 1944 after Roy C. Sugg was granted a permit by the Clark County planning commission for an airport on Mill Plain Road "seven miles east of Vancouver". Sugg sold the airport to Wally Olson in 1945.

Since 1964 it was home to the Northwest Antique Airplane Club (NWAAC) and the Evergreen Fly-In. A residential airpark was established adjacent to the airport in April 1968. In 1997, a four-year legal battle ended allowing the Evergreen North-South Airpark to continue operation after Evergreen's closure. After Olson's death in July 1997, his family continued to operate the airport until closing it in July 2006.

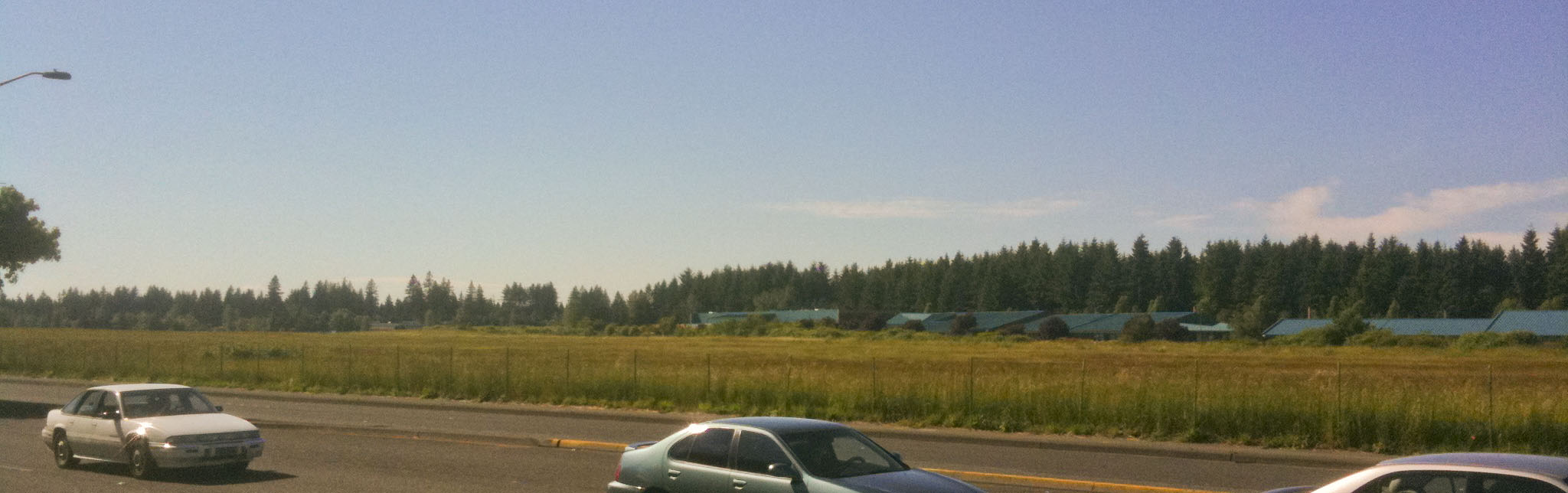
The open field where Evergreen Field was located.

The property was reportedly being sold for $15 million to a developer, but the $215 million redevelopment deal fell through in 2007.

== Facilities ==
Evergreen Field covered an area of 68 acres (28 ha) which contained two runways: 10L/28R with an asphalt pavement measuring 2,155 ft × 40 ft (657 m × 12 m) and 10R/28L with a turf surface measuring 2,000 ft × 100 ft (610 m × 30 m).
