= Stockham, Nebraska =

- Village
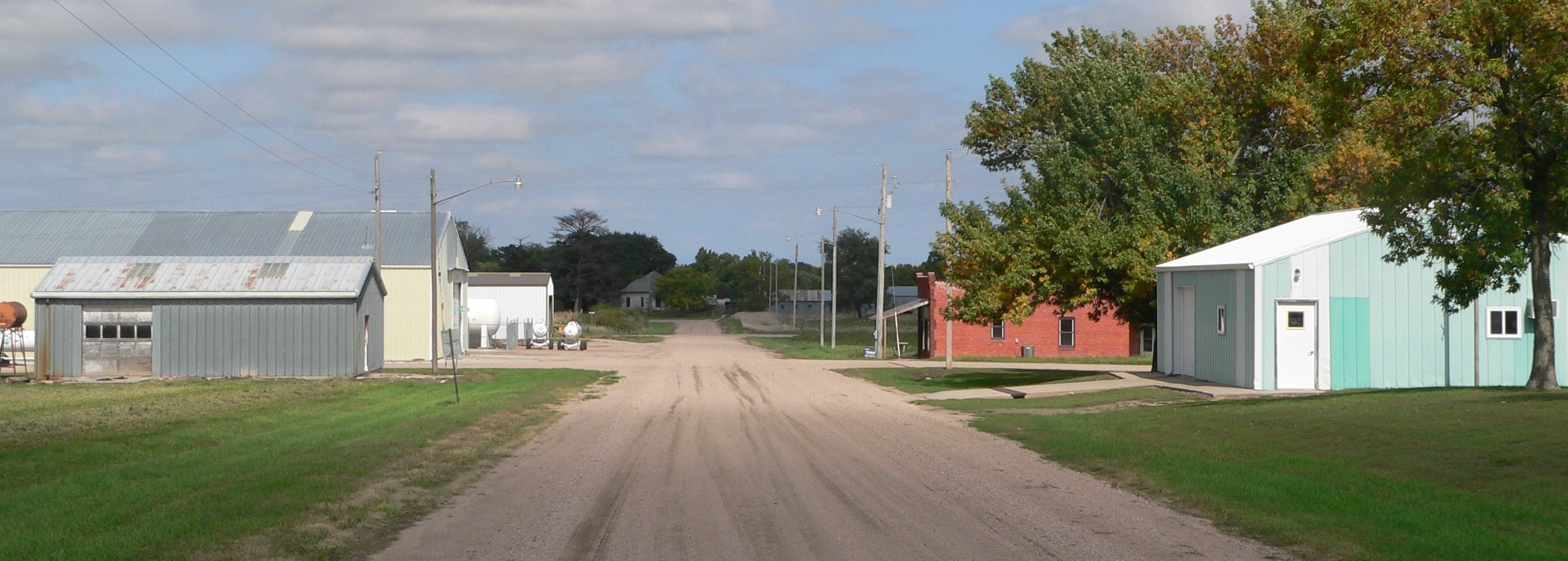
- Main Street, Stockham

- Location of Stockham, Nebraska
- Coordinates: 40°42′59″N 97°56′36″W
- Country: United States
- State: Nebraska
- County: Hamilton

Area
  - Total: 0.17 sq mi (0.44 km^{2})
  - Land: 0.17 sq mi (0.44 km^{2})
  - Water: 0 sq mi (0.00 km^{2})
- Elevation: 1,703 ft (519 m)

Population (2020)
  - Total: 32
  - Density: 188.9/sq mi (72.92/km^{2})
- Time zone: UTC-6 (Central (CST))
  - Summer (DST): UTC-5 (CDT)
- ZIP code: 68818
- Area code: 402
- FIPS code: 31-47220
- GNIS feature ID: 2399903

Stockham is a village in Hamilton County, Nebraska, United States. As of the 2020 census, Stockham had a population of 32.

== History ==
Stockham was platted in 1887 when the Fremont, Elkhorn and Missouri Valley Railroad was extended to that point, but an "Old Stockham" had existed nearby since the 1870s, and the community moved in order to be on the new railroad. The town was named for Joseph Stockham, town trustee. Stockham was incorporated as a village in 1888.

== Geography ==
According to the United States Census Bureau, the village has a total area of 0.17 square miles (0.44 km^{2}), all land.

== Demographics ==
Historical population
Census	Pop.	Note	%±
1890	211		—
1900	169		−19.9%
1910	189		11.8%
1920	239		26.5%
1930	211		−11.7%
1940	197		−6.6%
1950	82		−58.4%
1960	69		−15.9%
1970	65		−5.8%
1980	68		4.6%
1990	64		−5.9%
2000	60		−6.2%
2010	44		−26.7%
2020	32		−27.3%
U.S. Decennial Census

=== 2010 census ===
As of the census of 2010, there were 44 people, 18 households, and 14 families residing in the village. The population density was 258.8 inhabitants per square mile (99.9/km^{2}). There were 19 housing units at an average density of 111.8 per square mile (43.2/km^{2}). The racial makeup of the village was 100.0% White.

There were 18 households, of which 22.2% had children under the age of 18 living with them, 72.2% were married couples living together, 5.6% had a male householder with no wife present, and 22.2% were non-families. 22.2% of all households were made up of individuals, and 16.7% had someone living alone who was 65 years of age or older. The average household size was 2.44 and the average family size was 2.79.

The median age in the village was 52 years. 18.2% of residents were under the age of 18; 6.6% were between the ages of 18 and 24; 13.7% were from 25 to 44; 45.5% were from 45 to 64; and 15.9% were 65 years of age or older. The gender makeup of the village was 50.0% male and 50.0% female.

=== 2000 census ===
As of the census of 2000, there were 60 people, 19 households, and 14 families residing in the village. The population density was 351.8 inhabitants per square mile (135.8/km^{2}). There were 21 housing units at an average density of 123.1 per square mile (47.5/km^{2}). The racial makeup of the village was 100.00% White.

There were 19 households, out of which 42.1% had children under the age of 18 living with them, 68.4% were married couples living together, 5.3% had a female householder with no husband present, and 21.1% were non-families. 21.1% of all households were made up of individuals, and 10.5% had someone living alone who was 65 years of age or older. The average household size was 3.16 and the average family size was 3.73.

In the village, the population was spread out, with 31.7% under the age of 18, 16.7% from 18 to 24, 20.0% from 25 to 44, 28.3% from 45 to 64, and 3.3% who were 65 years of age or older. The median age was 35 years. For every 100 females, there were 106.9 males. For every 100 females age 18 and over, there were 105.0 males.

As of 2000 the median income for a household in the village was $31,250, and the median income for a family was $43,125. Males had a median income of $26,250 versus $0 for females. The per capita income for the village was $9,310. There were 23.1% of families and 37.9% of the population living below the poverty line, including 47.4% of under eighteens and 50.0% of those over 64.
