= Lincoln Beachey =

American aviator

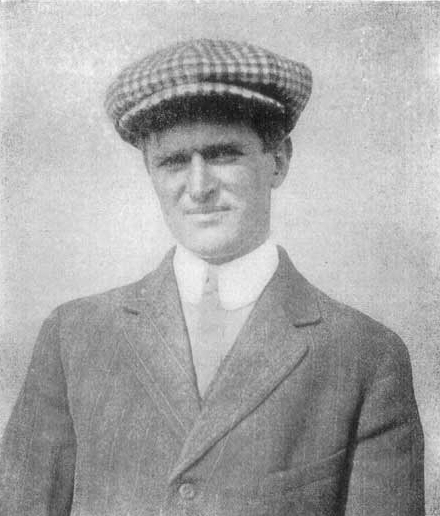
- Born: March 3, 1887; San Francisco, California, US
- Died: March 14, 1915 (aged 28); Panama–Pacific International Exposition; San Francisco, California, US
- Cause of death: Drowning
- Resting place: Cypress Lawn Memorial Park
- Occupation: Aviator
- Spouse: May (Minnie) Wyatt

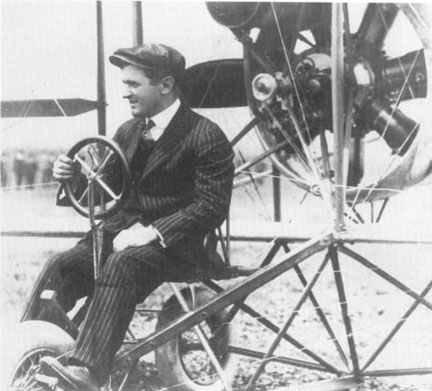
Lincoln Beachey, in his business suit he wore for flying

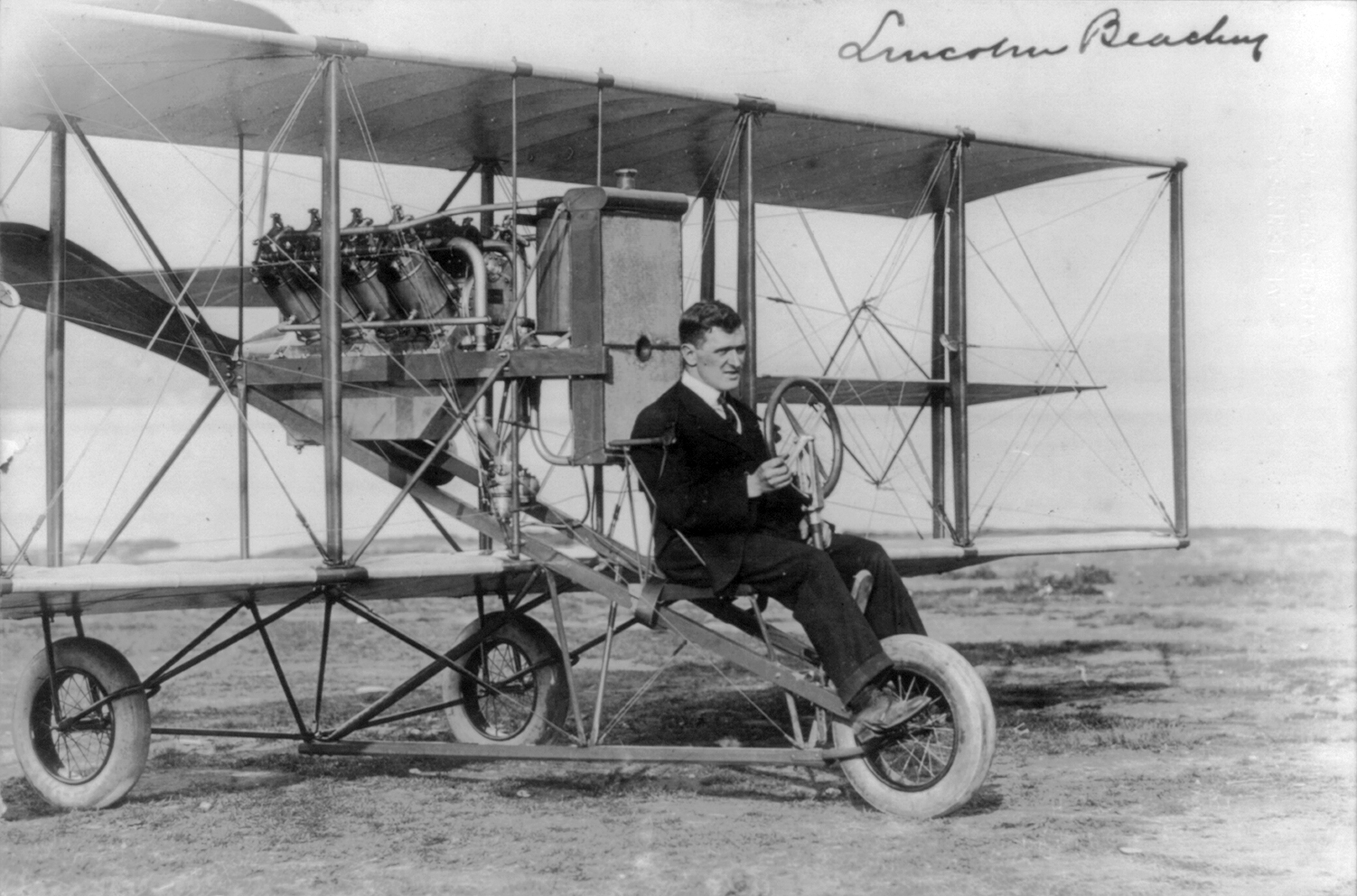
Lincoln Beachey with his plane

Lincoln Beachey (March 3, 1887 – March 14, 1915) was a pioneer American aviator and barnstormer. He became famous and wealthy from flying exhibitions, staging aerial stunts, helping invent aerobatics, and setting aviation records.

He was known as The Man Who Owns the Sky, and sometimes the Master Birdman. Beachey was acknowledged even by his competitors as "The World's Greatest Aviator". He was "known by sight to hundreds of thousands and by name to the whole world".

== Career ==
Lincoln Beachey was born on March 3, 1887, in San Francisco. In 1903, he first rode in a tethered balloon. In 1905, Lincoln and his older brother Hillery signed a contract with Thomas Scott Baldwin to fly his dirigible at the Lewis and Clark Centennial Exposition. On September 10, 1906, the Beachey brothers flew their dirigible around Washington, D.C., with Lincoln landing on the White House lawn, and then on the United States Capitol steps. Lincoln then participated in the 1910 Los Angeles International Air Meet at Dominguez Field. This led Lincoln to abandon dirigibles, and start his career with aeroplanes as a mechanic for Glenn Curtiss.

At the 1911 Los Angeles airshow, Beachey made the first successful nose-diving spin recovery, and deadstick landing. No previous pilot had survived a "deadly spiral." Lincoln then won the shortest take-off event at the Tanforan Aviation Meet.

Although Wilfred Parke is credited with developing "Parke's technique" to recover from a tailspin, Beachey is also cited as having discovered the maneuver. Climbing to 5,000 feet (1,500 m), he forced his plane into the spin and then turned the rudder in the direction of the spin, allowing him to level out. He repeated the maneuver eleven more times to confirm that it worked.

In June the organizers of the U.S.-Canadian International Carnival offered $4,000 to fly through the Niagara Gorge, and another $1,000 to fly under the Honeymoon Bridge. On June 27, 1911, Beachey flew his Curtiss D biplane before an estimated 150,000 spectators. Flying through the mist of Horseshoe Falls, then descending within 6 meters (20 feet) of the surface of the Niagara River, he flew his plane under the bridge, and down the length of the gorge.

At the 1911 Chicago International Aviation Meet, after coming in second in the fast climb event, Beachey entered a steep dive, and then flew alongside a locomotive, first on one side of the passenger cars, then on the other, before placing his wheels on top, hopping from one car to the next. Winning the altitude record, he had filled his tanks with fuel, climbing skyward until the fuel ran out after an hour and forty-eight minutes. After his engine quit, he glided in spirals to the ground over the next twelve minutes. The barograph aboard the plane showed he had reached a height of 11,642 feet (3,548 m), a world record for altitude.

In 1912, Beachey, Parmelee, and aviation pioneer Glenn Martin performed the first night flights in California with acetylene burners, fuses, and small noise making bombs dropped over Los Angeles. In 1913, Beachey took off inside the Machinery Palace on the Exposition grounds at the San Francisco World's Fair. He flew the plane at 60 miles per hour (97 km/h) and landed it, all inside the confines of the hall. His stunt speciality was the "dip-of-death", where he would take his plane up to 5,000 feet (1,500 m), and dive toward the ground at full speed with his hands outstretched. At the last moment he would level the plane and zoom down the raceway, with his hands off of the controls, gripping the control stick with his knees. In a jest aimed at Blanche Stuart Scott, another member of the Curtiss exhibition team, Beachey dressed up as a woman and pretended to be out of control in a mock terror to hundreds of thousands.

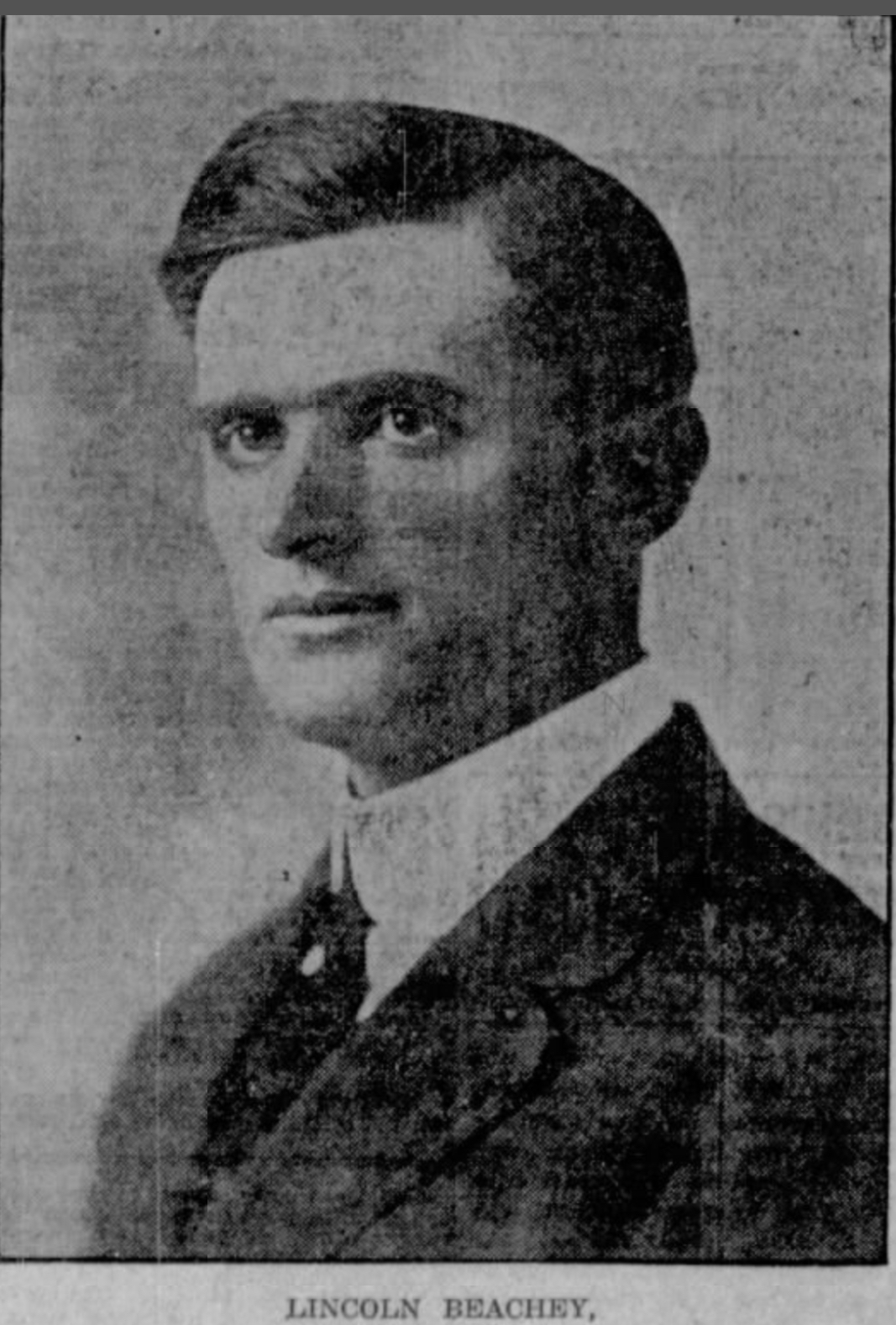

In 1913, a Russian pilot, Captain Pyotr Nesterov, made the first inside loop. Frenchman Adolphe Pegoud later that year became the second and more famous person to do it. Beachey wanted to try it himself. Curtiss refused to build him a plane capable of the stunt, and Beachey left the flying team. At the same time, he wrote a scathing essay about stunt flying, stating most people came to exhibitions out of morbid eagerness to see young pilots die. On March 7, 1913, he announced he would never again fly professionally, believing he was indirectly responsible for the deaths of several young aviators who had tried to emulate his stunts. In May, he would cite twenty-four fatalities, all of whom were "like brothers" to him.

Beachey went into the real estate business for a time, until Curtiss reluctantly agreed to build a stunt plane powerful enough to do the inside loop. Beachey returned and, on October 7, took the plane up in the air at Hammondsport, New York. On its first flight, either a downdraft or a loss of speed following a turn caused the plane to dip momentarily. One wing clipped the ridgepole of a tent on the field and the plane then swept two young women and two naval officers off the roof of a nearby hangar, from where they had been watching the flight, contrary to Beachey's wishes. One woman was killed and the others injured as a result of the fall, a distance of about 10 feet (3 m). Beachey's plane crashed in a nearby field but he managed to walk away from the wreckage with minor injuries. A coroner's jury ruled the death of the 20-year-old woman as accidental.

Beachey became an aviation superstar: In one year, 17 million people saw him fly. At the time, the population of the United States was just 90 million people. His achievements include inventing figure 8s and the vertical drop. He was also the first pilot to achieve terminal velocity by flying straight toward the ground. On November 24, 1913, he flew an inside loop, first flying upside down, and then flying repetitive loops over San Diego Bay. Beachey stated afterwards, "The silent Reaper of Souls and I shook hands that day."

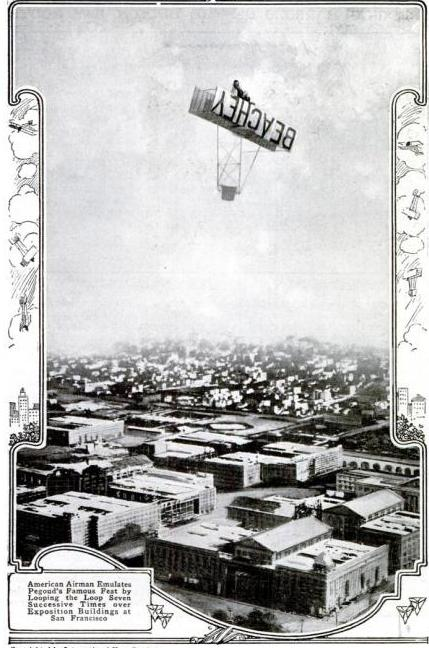
Lincoln Beachey flying a loop over the San Francisco Exposition

On March 3, 1914, Beachey formed his own company, with Bill Pickens as promoter, and Warren Eaton as aircraft designer and builder. After flying a Glenn L. Martin tractor configuration plane powered by a Gnome et Rhône engine, Beachey traveled to France and purchased two 80 horsepower Gnome Lambdas and brought it back to Chicago. One of those powered his "Little Looper" biplane, with a 21-foot wingspan, in which he demonstrated a tailslide.

During Beachey's 126-city tour in 1914, he would sometimes race Barney Oldfield on a local race track. Beachey's airshow spectators included Thomas Edison and Orville Wright. Orville Wright said, "An aeroplane in the hands of Lincoln Beachey is poetry. His mastery is a thing of beauty to watch. He is the most wonderful flyer of all."

In 1914, he dive-bombed the White House and Congress in a mock attack, proving that the US government was woefully unprepared for the age that was upon it.

On November 26, 1914 outside San Diego, according to Marrero, " Lincoln Beachey demonstrated the military use of airplanes by cropping sacks of flour on a ship, while Bill Pickens, his promotional wizard, set off charges to produce 'special effects' of black smoke."

== Death ==
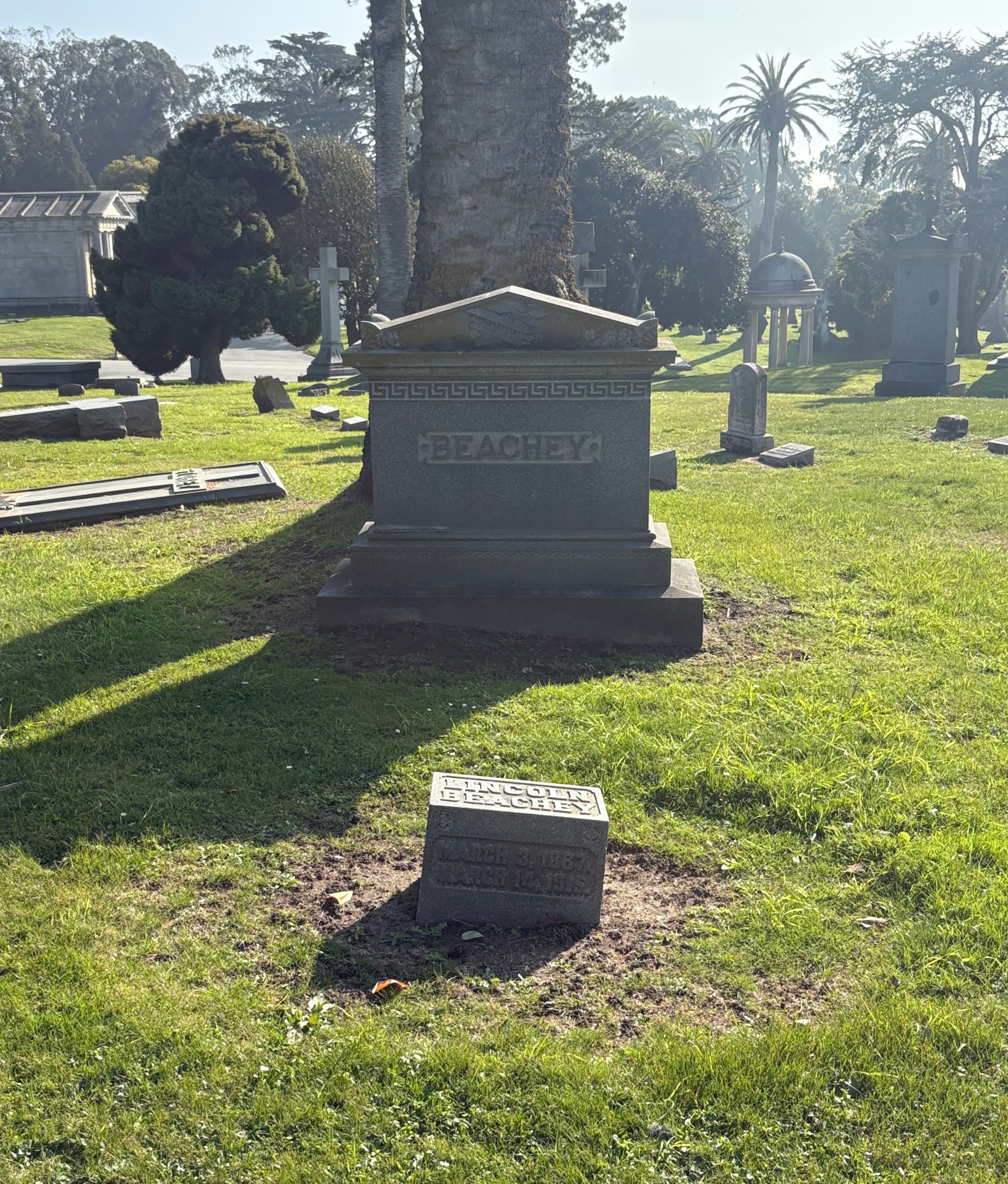
Beachey's grave at Cypress Lawn Memorial Park

Beachey made his final flight at the Panama–Pacific International Exposition. Prior to the exposition, in 1914, he had the Beachey-Eaton Monoplane built, the Taube (Dove), which included tricycle landing gear, enclosed cockpit, ailerons at the ends and rear of the wings, and cowling around his Gnome engine.

On March 14, 1915, he took the plane up in front of a crowd of 50,000 (inside the Fairgrounds—with another 200,000 on the hills), made a loop, and turned the plane onto its back. He may have been so intent on leveling the inverted plane, he failed to notice he was only 2,000 feet (610 m) above San Francisco Bay. He pulled on the controls to pull the plane out of its inverted position, where it was slowly sinking. The strain caused the rear spars in its wings to break, and the crumpled plane plunged into the bay between two ships. Navy men jumped into action, but it took 1 hour and 45 minutes to recover Beachey's body. Even then, rescuers spent three hours trying to revive him. The autopsy found he had survived the crash with only a broken leg, but had died from drowning, unable to release his safety harness while falling.

Thousands lined the streets for his funeral in San Francisco. On the one year anniversary of his death, a memorial organized by aviator Edna Christofferson drew hundreds to pay their respects, and the San Francisco Examiner reported that Beachey's grave "was buried under an avalanche of floral tributes." He was interred at Cypress Lawn Memorial Park in Colma.

== In popular culture ==
Beachey's final flight, which resulted in his death, was remembered in a children's jump-rope rhyme which was sung by children in San Francisco in the 1920s,

Lincoln Beachey thought it was a dream

To go up to heaven in a flying machine.

The machine broke down, and down he fell.

Instead of going to heaven he went to . . .

Lincoln Beachey thought it was a dream...

Beachey is also referenced in pages 19 and 20 of the fiction book Johnny Got His Gun. In the book he is flying over the main character's home town.
