= Eddy Jerman =

Eddy C. Jerman
- Born: November 21, 1865
- Died: September 13, 1936 (aged 70)
- Education: Franklin College
- Medical career
- Profession: Medical device manufacturer, educator
- Field: Medical radiography

Eddy Clifford Jerman (November 21, 1865 – September 13, 1936) was an American inventor and an early expert in the techniques of medical radiography. In the years that followed the discovery of X-rays, Jerman was one of the first people to focus on the details that created quality X-ray images, such as exposure and positioning. He served as an examiner during the initial efforts to license personnel who took X-rays. He has been referred to as "the father of radiography".

== Biography ==
Jerman was born on November 21, 1865, in Ripley County, Indiana. He was the son of a physician. As a child, he became interested in the study of the batteries that powered his father's medical equipment. He attended Franklin College in Indiana, but experienced health problems in his last year and was unable to finish his studies. Jerman went to work for the Physicians & Surgeons Supply Company in Cincinnati, a medical device company. He became the shop foreman there and then created the Jerman Electric Company.

As part of his new enterprise, Jerman manufactured a power source for other medical equipment known as a Jerman static machine. His device was the only one available that was large enough to create X-rays. When Jerman created his first X-ray image, he created an image of his own hand. He described taping his hand down with electrical tape and exposing the hand to the radiation for 30 minutes. He worked closely with Victor Electric Company in the manufacture of his machines. Suffering from health issues again, Jerman left Cincinnati for Topeka, Kansas, in search of a more suitable climate.

Jerman thought that insufficient attention had been paid to standardizing radiographic technique in the years since the discovery of X-ray. X-rays had been used largely for entertainment purposes in those early days and clinical techniques varied from provider to provider. He wrote that "the weakest link of the chain was technique, and the chain could be no stronger than its weakest link." By 1916, he had begun offering courses in radiography to professionals. About two years later, Jerman became the head of the education division at Victor Electric Company. In that capacity, he established 12 divisions of the company that offered classes to healthcare providers. The courses lasted between five and seven days.

The American Roentgen Ray Society (ARRS) made Jerman its president in 1920 and he served several terms, becoming president emeritus in 1930. Jerman wrote Modern X-ray Technic (1928), the first textbook of radiographic techniques. It was published for several editions. He was a founder of the American Association of Radiological Technicians (now the American Society of Radiologic Technologists). Jerman served as the examiner for the first 1,000 candidates for credentialing by the American Registry of X-Ray Technicians.

Late in his life, Jerman became interested in the application of X-rays to fields like botany, zoology and paleontology. After retiring in 1934, Jerman died two years later. In his final months, he dealt with painful sequelae of frequent X-ray exposure.
