= Henry Hope Wong =

Aviator (b. 1900)

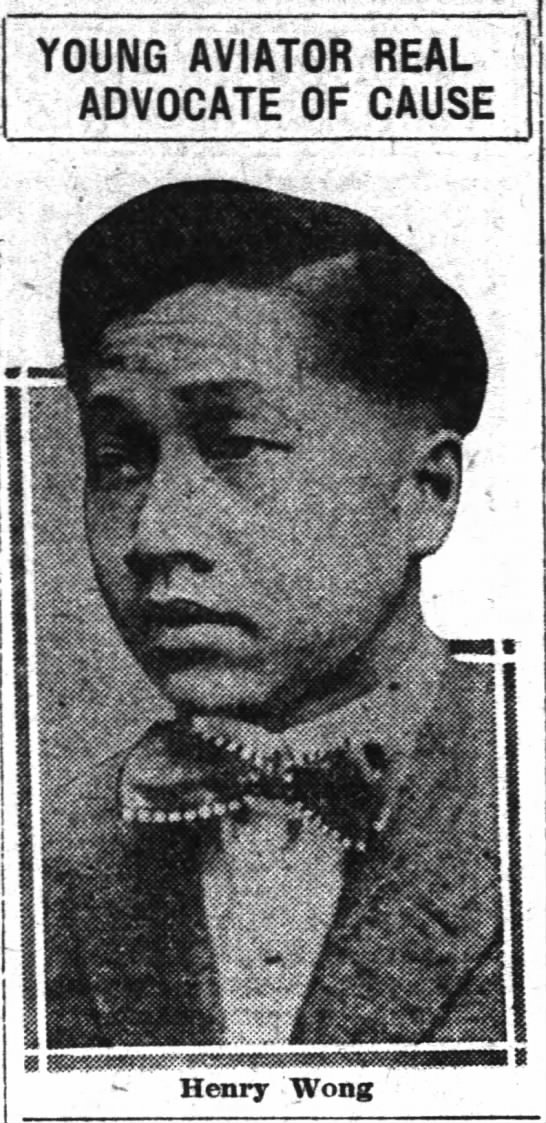
- Wong with bow tie
- Born: 1900; Portland, Oregon, United States
- Died: Unknown
- Occupation(s): Pilot and inventor

Henry Hope Wong was an early Chinese-American aviator from Portland, Oregon. At the age of 19, he designed, built and flew his own plane.

Wong was born in Portland, Oregon in 1900. He grew up at 246 Jefferson and First Street. His father, Wong Fook On, was a Chinese immigrant who used the name William Hope in dealings with white Americans. In later documents, Wong Fook On was often referred to as William Hope Wong. Wong Fook On and his wife, Chun Yow, had five other sons and one daughter. The family were members of the Holt Presbyterian Church. Henry Hope Wong attended the Couch Grammar School, and began working "even earlier than the law would allow a Caucasian to labor for pay."

Wong was interested in planes from a young age, and began saving his wages towards a career in aviation. He "made a continuous study of aeroplanes; read innumerable books, built models and made drawings." Wong planned to study at the American School of Aviation in Chicago, but his father believed flying was too dangerous. After Wong sent his design for an airplane model to the school, they wrote to his parents, urging the Wongs to let their son attend. Wong's father still refused to pay the cost, so Wong's uncle, Wong Tee, paid instead.

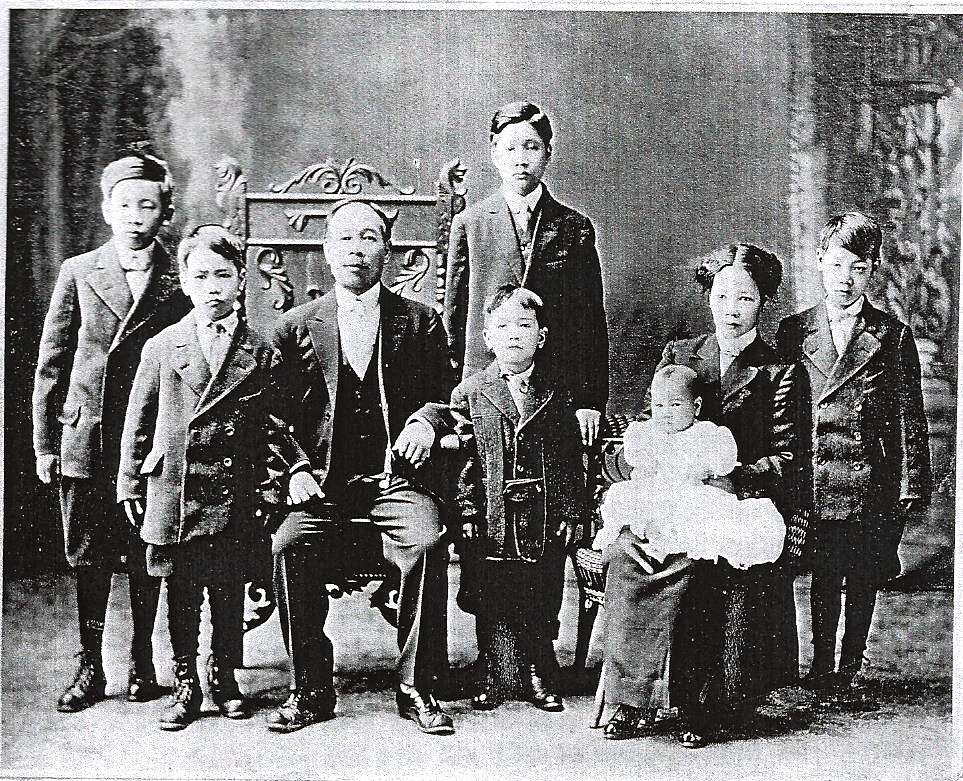
Hope Wong family portrait, 1913

Soon after Wong enrolled in the American School of Aviation, the instructor was injured, and Wong's tuition was refunded. He remained in Chicago for two months, working in the E.B. Health Plane Company's factory.

At the age of sixteen, Wong enrolled in the Beam School of Aviation in Celina, Ohio. He made his first flight after less than two months of school, reaching an altitude of 5,827 feet. Between flights, he studied the theory of aviation and learned to assemble airplane parts. On one flight, Wong "reached an altitude of 7,000 feet." He claimed to have had only one accident in training, when a ground wire broke as he was preparing to take off and caused the plane to flip over. Wong received a scar under his right eye, but did not seem to be seriously injured. At the age of seventeen, he graduated with high honors and was awarded a diploma "as a regular aviator." He shared his thoughts on aviation with The Oregon Daily Journal:

"Yes, it's lonesome up there. Seems that there is nothing in the world but me and the plane. The earth looks like a checkerboard with its farms, woods, and cities. What if something were to go wrong? Well, I'd just go wrong too, I guess. You can't do anything in a case of that kind and have got to take the consequences. But there is no reason for anything going wrong with the present perfection of airplanes. All you've got to do is be careful. There is a great future for aviation and I'm glad something told me while I am young and can take full advantage of it."

After graduating, Wong applied to the United States Signal Corps, but was rejected because he was under eighteen. He began planning to build his own airplane "so that he may keep in training and be in readiness to report for duty in case his services are needed before he attains the proper age for military service." Wong's early estimate of the cost was $2500 (roughly $49000 today). He returned to Portland in the fall of 1917 and began building the plane in his parents' house.

Wong named his plane the H.W. It was a "tractor biplane" with two sets of wings, a 90-horsepower engine, and two passenger seats. The plane was 27 feet long and 12 feet high, with wings 40 feet across. The Oregon Daily Journal reported that "the wood is dressed and polished up as handsomely as if done by an expert." Wong did much of the building in a shop on 290 South 3rd Street, finishing in 1919. Wong remarked on his difficulties building the H.W.:

"I have been two years building my biplane, because I would run short of money and had to go to work and earn more. If at the beginning I had had the necessary means I could have accomplished my object in six months. But I am near the end of my task now. I expect to be flying by the middle of July."

After finishing work on the H.W., Wong showed the plane in "an automobile salesroom on Broadway and Burnside Streets". In July 1919, he began testing the plane in the area of Portland called Mock's Bottom. While trying to take off on one of his flights, Wong collided with a tree stump and broke his propeller. A week later, on 22 July 1919, Wong was flying the H.W. when it began to rock from side to side. At 50–100 feet above the ground, the plane went into a sudden nosedive. The H.W. crashed into the ground nose-first, breaking the propeller and tail, splintering the body, and trapping Wong under the wreckage. Spectators pulled Wong out and took him to the Good Samaritan Hospital. His worst injury appeared to be a sprained back. After this point in the record, it is not clear what happened to Wong.

W.R. Cheadle, who worked with Wong on the H.W., blamed the crash on the roughness of the ground at Mock's Bottom:

"Because of this, he said, Wong was obliged to rise before he had attained enough headway on the ground, climbed at a 45-degree angle and found he had insufficient power to keep going on such an abrupt ascent. The machine struck directly on its running gear, said Cheadle, bending the axle and causing the fusilage to break in two when the momentum doubled over the plane's tail."

== See also ==
- Hazel Ying Lee
- Leah Hing
- Arthur Chin
