= Multnomah Hotel =

Hotel and historic building in Portland, Oregon, U.S.

- U.S. National Register of Historic Places
- Portland Historic Landmark
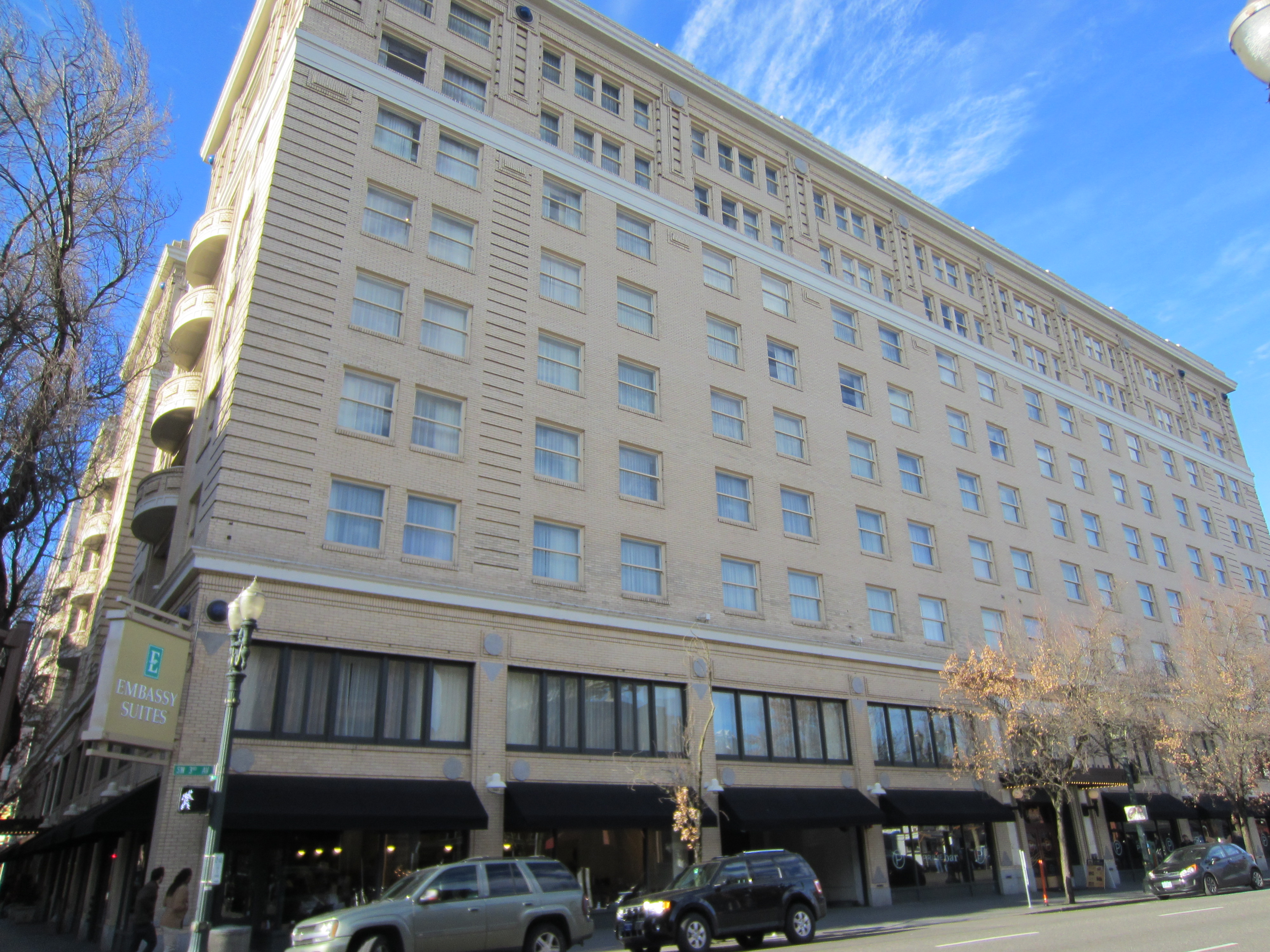
- Embassy Suites Portland - Downtown seen in 2012 (former Multnomah Hotel)

- Location within Portland, Oregon
- Location: 319 SW Pine Street; Portland, Oregon
- Coordinates: 45°31′19″N 122°40′27″W
- Built: 1911-1912
- Architects: Gibson & Cahill
- Architectural style: American Renaissance
- NRHP reference No.: 85000369
- Added to NRHP: February 28, 1985

The Multnomah Hotel, located in downtown Portland, Oregon, United States, is a historic hotel building listed on the National Register of Historic Places. It currently operates as the Embassy Suites by Hilton Portland Downtown and was inducted as a member of Historic Hotels of America in 2016.

== History ==
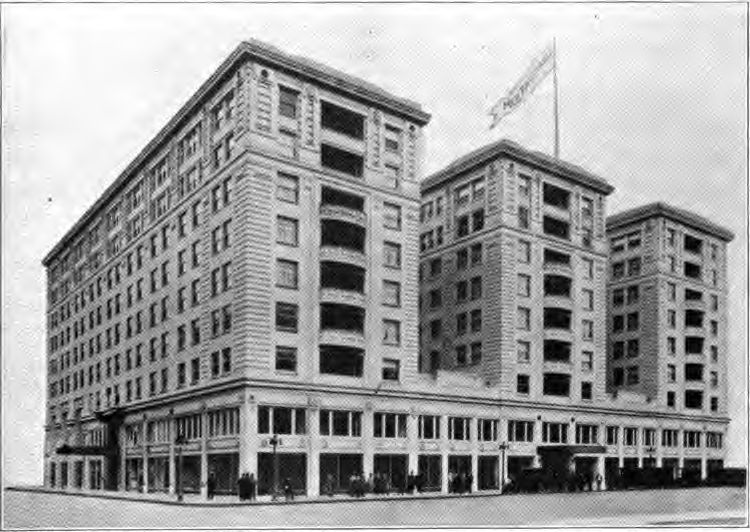
Multnomah Hotel circa 1920

The 700-room hotel was built by local entrepreneur Philip Gevurtz and opened on February 8, 1912. The nine-story building filled an entire city block. It was operated by Western Hotels, now known as Westin Hotels & Resorts, from 1931 until it closed in 1963. At the time of its closure, The Oregonian wrote that the Multnomah had been "one of the most famous hotels on the Pacific Coast". From 1965 to 1992 the building housed government offices. It was sold in 1995 and restored, its 700 rooms reduced to 276 suites, reopening in 1997 as the Embassy Suites Portland - Downtown. The hotel is currently a member of Historic Hotels of America, the official program of the National Trust for Historic Preservation.

== Famous guests ==
The hotel has hosted Paramahansa Yogananda, Queen Marie of Romania, Charles Lindbergh, Rudolph Valentino, Amelia Earhart, Jimmy Stewart, Bing Crosby, Jack Benny, Elvis Presley, and every president from Theodore Roosevelt to Richard Nixon. Maurice Ravel and Lisa Roma played a concert in the hotel ballroom on February 15, 1928.

== See also ==
- National Register of Historic Places listings in Southwest Portland, Oregon
