= Haining railway station =

Railway station in Jiaxing, China

Coordinates: 30.5361°N 120.6812°E

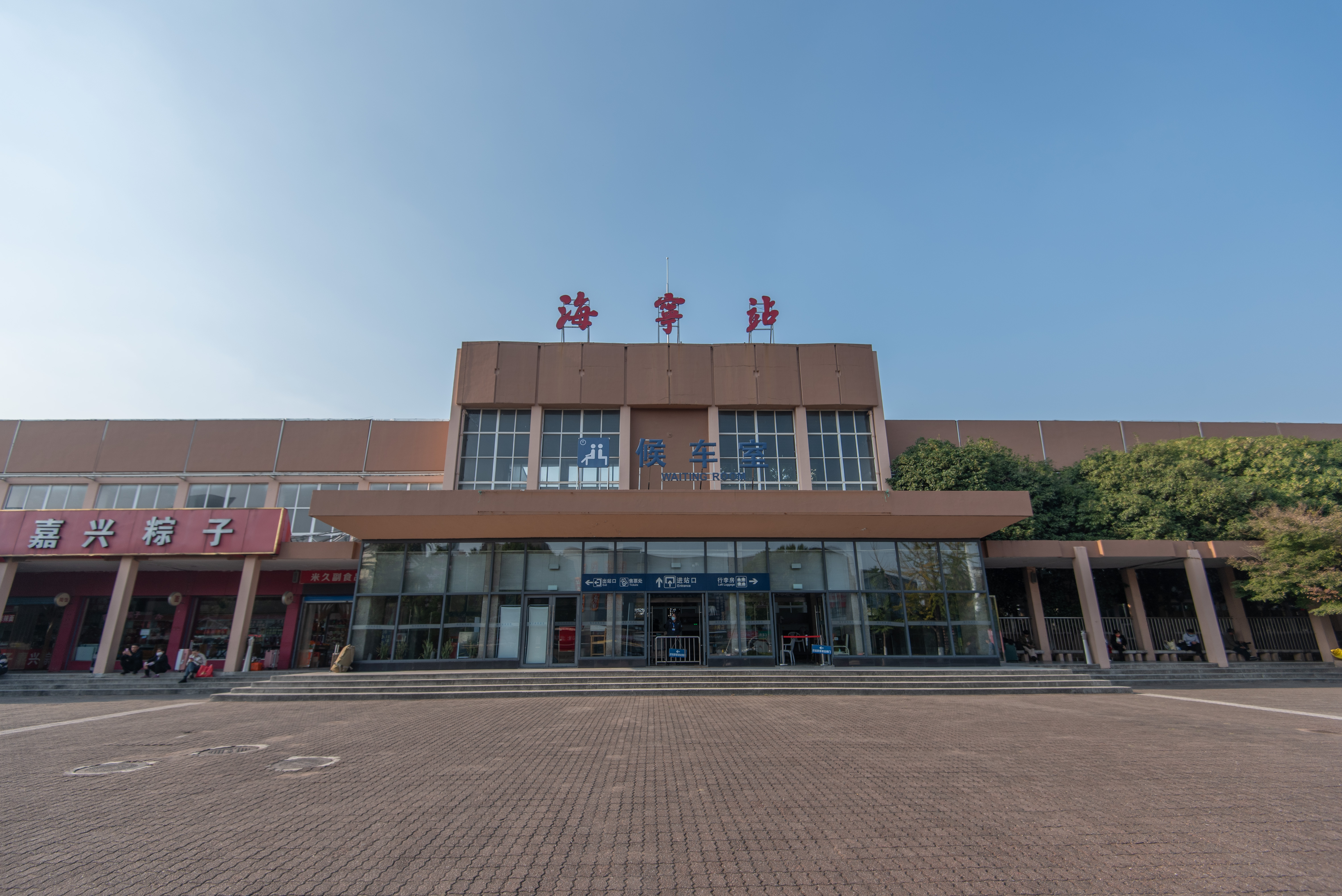
The entrance to Haining Railway Station

Haining railway station (simplified Chinese: 海宁站; traditional Chinese: 海寧站; pinyin: Hǎiníng zhàn) is a railway station on the Shanghai–Kunming railway located in Haining, Jiaxing, Zhejiang in China.

== See also ==
- Haining West railway station

Preceding station	China Railway	Following station
Jiaxing towards Shanghai or Shanghai South	Shanghai–Kunming railway	Hangzhou towards Kunming
