= Jiaxing South railway station =

Railway station in Jiaxing, China

Jiaxingnan 嘉兴南站
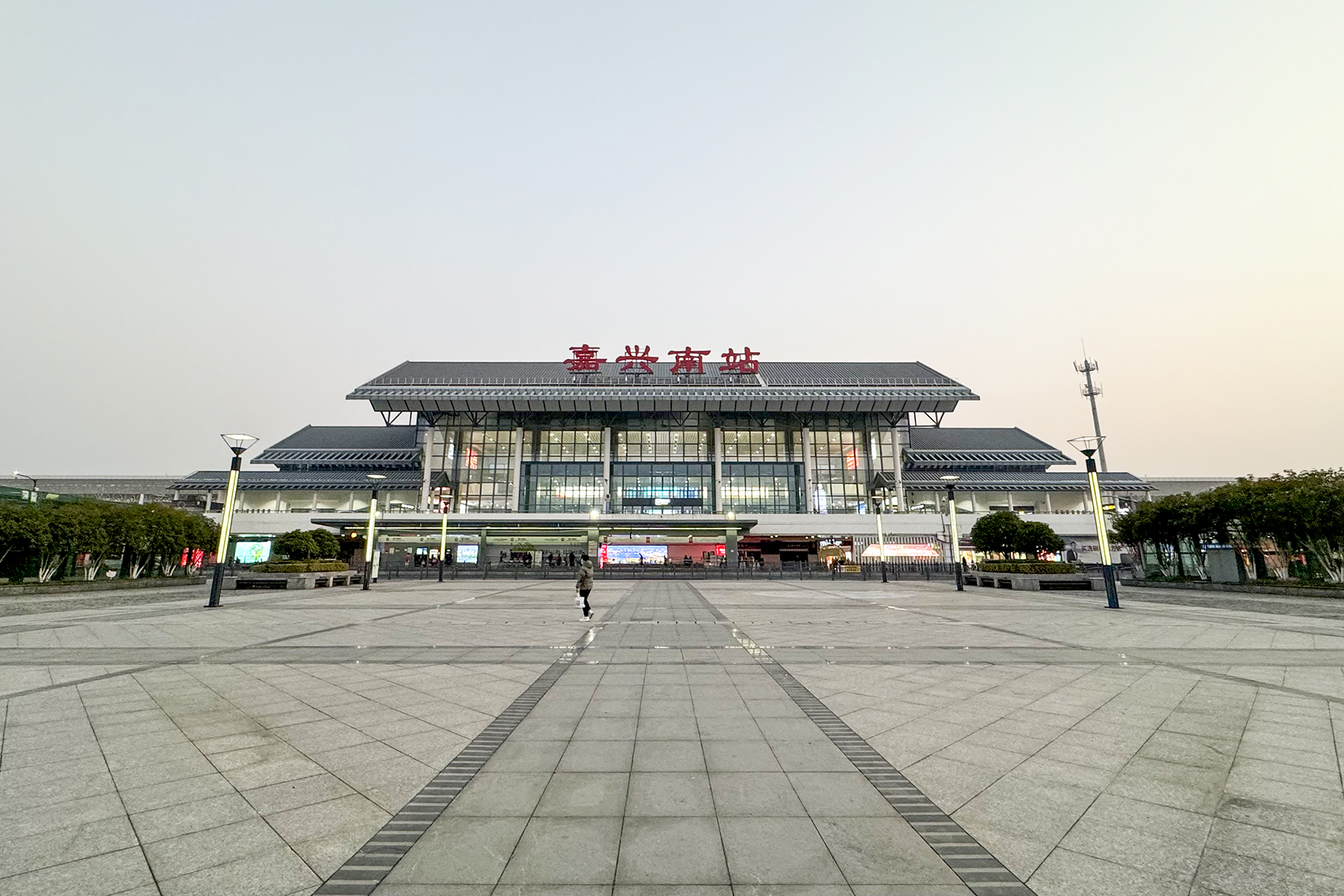

General information
- Other names: Jiaxing South
- Location: Nanhu District, Jiaxing, Zhejiang; China
- Coordinates: 30°41′35″N 120°47′44″E
- Operated by: China Railway Shanghai Group
- Line(s): Shanghai–Hangzhou high-speed railway; Nantong–Ningbo high-speed railway (planned)

Other information
- Station code: 32013 (TMIS code); EPH (telegram code); JXN (pinyin code)
- Classification: 2nd class station

History
- Opened: October 26, 2010
Location

Jiaxing South railway station
- Traditional Chinese: 嘉興南站
- Simplified Chinese: 嘉兴南站
Transcriptions
Standard Mandarin
- Hanyu Pinyin: Jiāxīng nán zhàn

Jiaxingnan (Jiaxing South) railway station (simplified Chinese: 嘉兴南站; traditional Chinese: 嘉興南站; pinyin: Jiāxīng nán zhàn) is a railway station on the Shanghai–Hangzhou high-speed railway located in Nanhu District, Jiaxing, Zhejiang, People's Republic of China. It is only used for high-speed EMU G and D trains and has four platforms and eight rail lines. Normal-speed trains arrive at and depart from Jiaxing railway station.

It was officially opened on October 26, 2010.

At peak times, the station handles 2300 people per hour.

== Connections ==
The station is the southern terminus of the Jiaxing Tram. It is also connected to the city by public buses.

Preceding station	China Railway High-speed	Following station
Jiashan South towards Shanghai South or Shanghai Hongqiao	Shanghai–Hangzhou high-speed railway	Tongxiang towards Hangzhou
