= Hangzhou–Haining intercity railway =

Railway line in Zhejiang, China

Hangzhou–Haining Intercity Rail
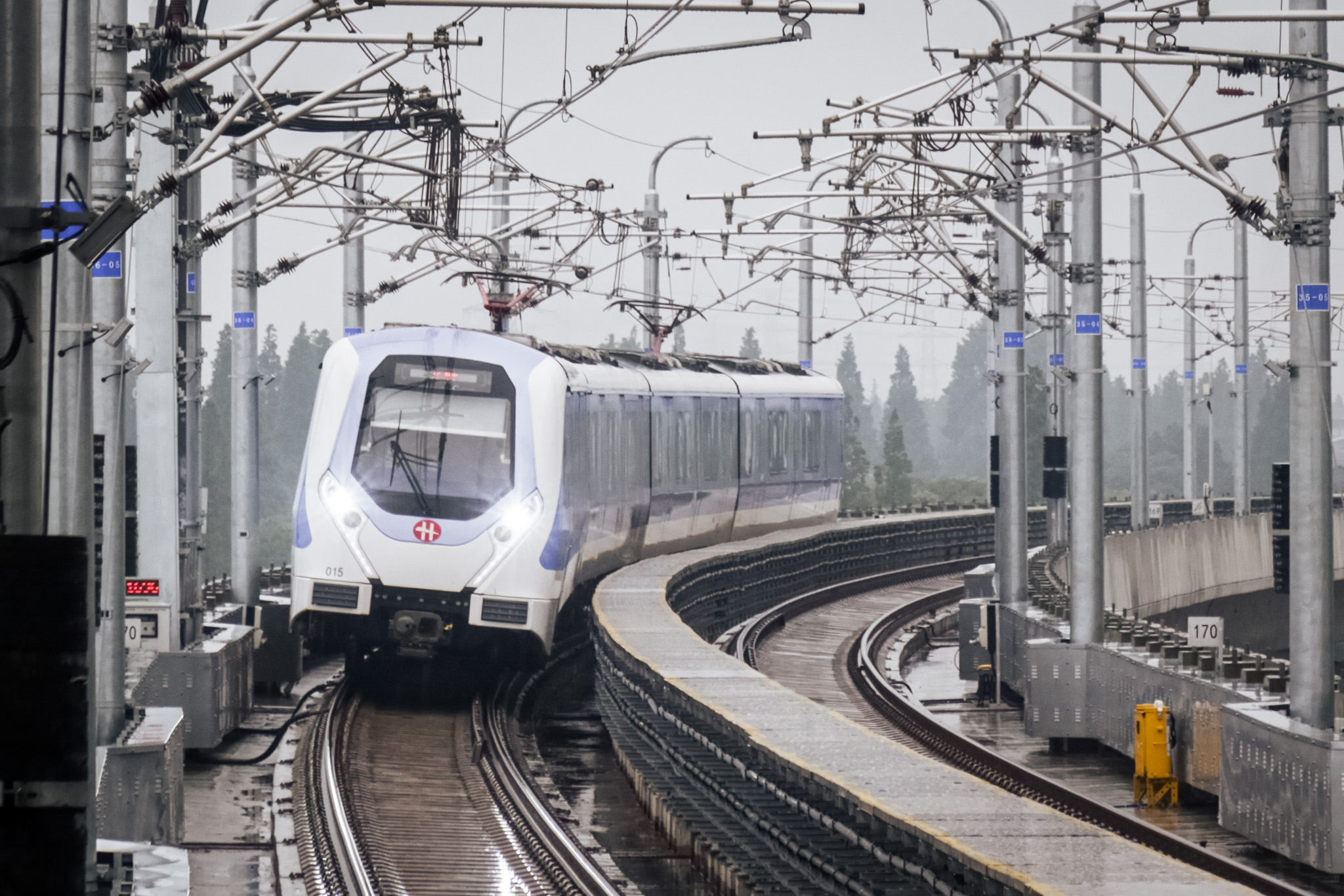

Overview
- Other name: Hangzhou–Haining Intercity Railway (杭州至海宁城际铁路、杭海城际铁路)
- Status: Operational
- Locale: Hangzhou and Haining, Zhejiang, China
- Termini: Linpingnan Railway Station; International Campus, ZJU
- Stations: 12

Service
- Type: Intercity rail, Suburban railway
- System: Hangzhou Metro (transfer available, separate fare required)
- Operator: Zhejiang Rail Transit Operation Management Group Co., Ltd
- Rolling stock: 4 car CRRC Nanjing Puzhen PM143

History
- Opened: 28 June 2021; 5 years ago

Technical
- Line length: 46.38 km (28.819 mi)
- Num of tracks: 2
- Character: Underground and Elevated
- Track gauge: 1,435 mm (4 ft 8 1/2 in)
- Loading gauge: Type B
- Electrification: Overhead line, 1500 V DC
- Operating speed: 120 km/h (75 mph)
- Signalling: Moving block CBTC

The Hangzhou–Haining Intercity Rail (Chinese: 杭海城际, abbreviation: HHCJ), also known as the Hanghai line, is a suburban metro line connected to, but operated independently of, the Hangzhou Metro that connects the cities of Hangzhou and Haining in Zhejiang, China. The line's total length is 46.38 km (28.819 mi) and it has 12 stations, including 4 underground stations, 8 elevated stations and 2 stations with passing loops for express services. The construction on the line began in late 2016 and it opened on 28 June 2021.

== Opening timeline ==
In November 2012, the Haining Municipal Government started preliminary work on the project. In December of the same year, an agreement was signed with the Yuhang District of Hangzhou.

In February 2013, the Zhejiang Provincial Development and Reform Commission submitted the "Recent Construction Plan for the Intercity Railway in the Metropolitan Area of Zhejiang Province" to the National Development and Reform Commission, the plan includes the Hangzhou-Haining Intercity Railway. This plan was approved by the NDRC on 16 December 2014. construction started on the first section of the Hangzhou–Haining intercity railway project between Chang'an and Zhouwangmiao Stations on 15 December 2016.

Segment	Commencement	Length	Station(s)	Name
Yuhang Railway Station (now Linpingnan Railway Station) — International Campus, ZJU	28 June 2021	46.38 km (28.819 mi)	12	

== Fares ==
Fares for the line start at ¥2 for a trip of 4 km (2.485 mi) or less. For trips between 4 and 12 km (2.485 and 7.456 mi), each additional 4 km (2.485 mi) or less costs ¥1. For trips between 12 and 24 km (7.456 and 14.913 mi), each additional 6 km (3.728 mi) or less costs ¥1. For trips over 24 km (14.913 mi), each additional 8 km (4.971 mi) costs ¥1. A trip along the entire line from Linpingnan Railway Station to International Campus, ZJU costs ¥9. The fare for this line is counted separately from the rest of the Hangzhou Metro.

Hangzhou Metro and Shaoxing Metro farecards (including senior cards) and the Hangzhou Metro and Shaoxing Metro ride code can be used on the line. It is possible to buy a ticket from any metro station in Hangzhou or Shaoxing directly to a station on the Hangzhou-Haining Intercity Rail, as passengers do not pass through ticket gates when transferring at Linpingnan Railway Station. However, Hangzhou Metro adult farecard discounts (i.e. monthly 10%/30%/50% loyalty discount) and day passes are not valid on the Hangzhou-Haining Intercity Rail.

== Route description ==
The line begins in the Linping district of Hangzhou at the Linpingnan Railway Station metro station, which connects the line to Line 9 (formerly the Linping branch of Line 1) of the Hangzhou Metro and is the only place on the line where passengers can transfer to the Hangzhou Metro. The line starts underground in its first tunnel (out of three tunnels) parallel to the Shanghai-Hangzhou high-speed railway and proceeds eastward underground, where it surfaces and rises to a viaduct before reaching Xucun station. The line continues eastward, continuing to parallel the Shanghai-Hangzhou high-speed railway, until it reaches Hainingxi Railway Station, where passengers can transfer to the high-speed rail station of the same name, which parallels the Hangzhou-Haining Intercity Rail station.

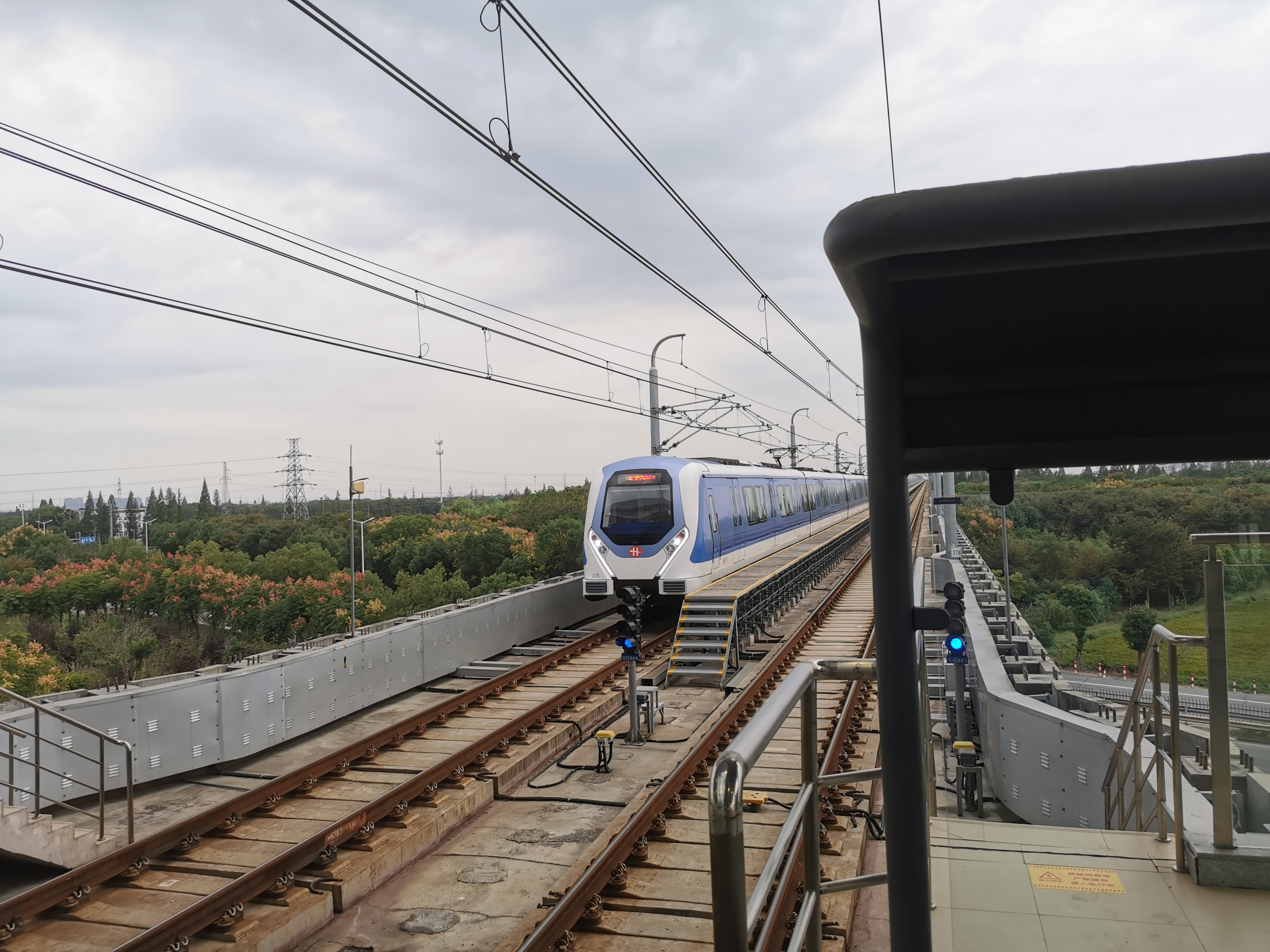
A train on the Hangzhou-Haining Intercity Rail arrives at Yanguan station.

Past Hainingxi Railway Station, the line enters its second tunnel, where it curves away from the Shanghai-Hangzhou high-speed railway. The line then rises back to a viaduct and reaches the town of Chang'an and makes several stops there. Past Chang'an, the line reaches Zhouwangmiao station, which contains the first of the line's two passing loops for express trains. The train travels through the rural countryside until it reaches Yanguan station, located north of the Yanguan Town Tide-Viewing Park.

The line then passes by the Yanguan Depot, located north of the tracks, which stores and maintains the fleet of trains used on the line, and Tongjiu Highway station, a station at a road that leads northwards to Tongxiang. At Xieqiao station, the line reaches its second and final passing loop for express trains.

Arriving in downtown Haining, the line descends into its third and final tunnel, making three final stops at Leather City, Haichang Road, and International Campus, ZJU, all three of which are located underground. The tail tracks, which are used for reversing trains, extend a couple hundred metres past International Campus, ZJU station, ending just before reaching the station's namesake campus.

The line does not share tracks with any other line, and its trackage is completely isolated from the Hangzhou Metro and the national railway system.

=== Westward extension ===
A 1.02 kilometre westward extension past the Linpingnan Railway Station metro station to Wenzheng Street station is in progress.

=== Xiasha-Chang'an Intercity Railway ===
A branch line called the Xiasha-Chang'an Intercity Railway also known as the Hangchang Intercity Railway or the Qianhai Intercity Railway started construction in June 2025 and is planned to be completed and opened to traffic by the end of 2029. It connects the Xiasha area of Qiantang District in Hangzhou with Chang'an Town in Haining City, Jiaxing City at Chang'an (Dongfang College) station on the Hangzhou–Haining intercity railway. The line is 20.79 kilometers long with 7 stations, including 3 underground stations and 4 elevated stations. It as a design speed of 120 kilometers per hour and designed for train services to through operate into the Hangzhou–Haining intercity railway.

== Stations ==

Notes on service routes as of June 2024:

- L: Local service, runs every 10 minutes throughout the day, departing at :00, :10, :20, :30, :40 and :50 past the hour at both termini
- Ex: Express service, runs once a day per direction with one train in the morning towards Hangzhou and another train in the afternoon to Haining, only trains toward Linpingnan Railway Station stop at Hainingxi Railway Station (↑), and only those toward International Campus, ZJU stop at Chang'an (Dongfang College) (↓)

Service Routes		Station name		Connections	Distance km	Location	
L	Ex	English	Chinese	Connections	Distance km	Location	
●	●	Linpingnan Railway Station	临平南高铁站	9 EVH		Linping	Hangzhou
●	｜	Xucun	许村			Haining	Jiaxing
●	↑	Hainingxi Railway Station	海宁高铁西站	EUH		Haining	Jiaxing
●	↓	Chang'an (Dongfang College)	长安 (东方学院)	Hangchang Intercity Railway		Haining	Jiaxing
●	｜	Chang'an East	长安东			Haining	Jiaxing
●	｜	Zhouwangmiao	周王庙			Haining	Jiaxing
●	｜	Yanguan	盐官			Haining	Jiaxing
●	｜	Tongjiu Highway	桐九公路			Haining	Jiaxing
●	｜	Xieqiao	斜桥			Haining	Jiaxing
●	●	Leather City	皮革城			Haining	Jiaxing
●	●	Haichang Road	海昌路			Haining	Jiaxing
●	●	International Campus, ZJU	浙大国际校区			Haining	Jiaxing
		Biyun (construction deferred)	碧云			Haining	Jiaxing

Passing loops for express trains are located at Zhouwangmiao and Xieqiao stations.

There is a police checkpoint at Linpingnan Railway Station. Passengers’ identity documents may be checked by the police when passing through the transfer corridor from the Hangzhou–Haining Intercity Rail to the Hangzhou Metro.

== Rolling stock ==
The line uses Type B metro-style rolling stock with a top speed of 120 km/h. Seating is arranged in a 2+2 fashion with soft padded seats.

Stock	Class	Year built	Builder	Number built	Numbers	Formation	Depots	Line assigned	Notes
PM143	B (Express train)	2020–2021	CRRC Nanjing Puzhen	68 (17 sets)	HH 001 - HH 017 (HH0011-HH0174)	TMc+Mp+Mp+TMc	Yanguan Depot	Hanghai	
PM258	B (Express train)	2023–2024	CRRC Nanjing Puzhen	24 (6 sets)	HH 018 - HH 023 (HH0181-HH0234)	TMc+Mp+Mp+TMc	Yanguan Depot	Hanghai	
