= Jinshan North railway station =

Railway station in Shanghai, China

Jinshanbei 金山北
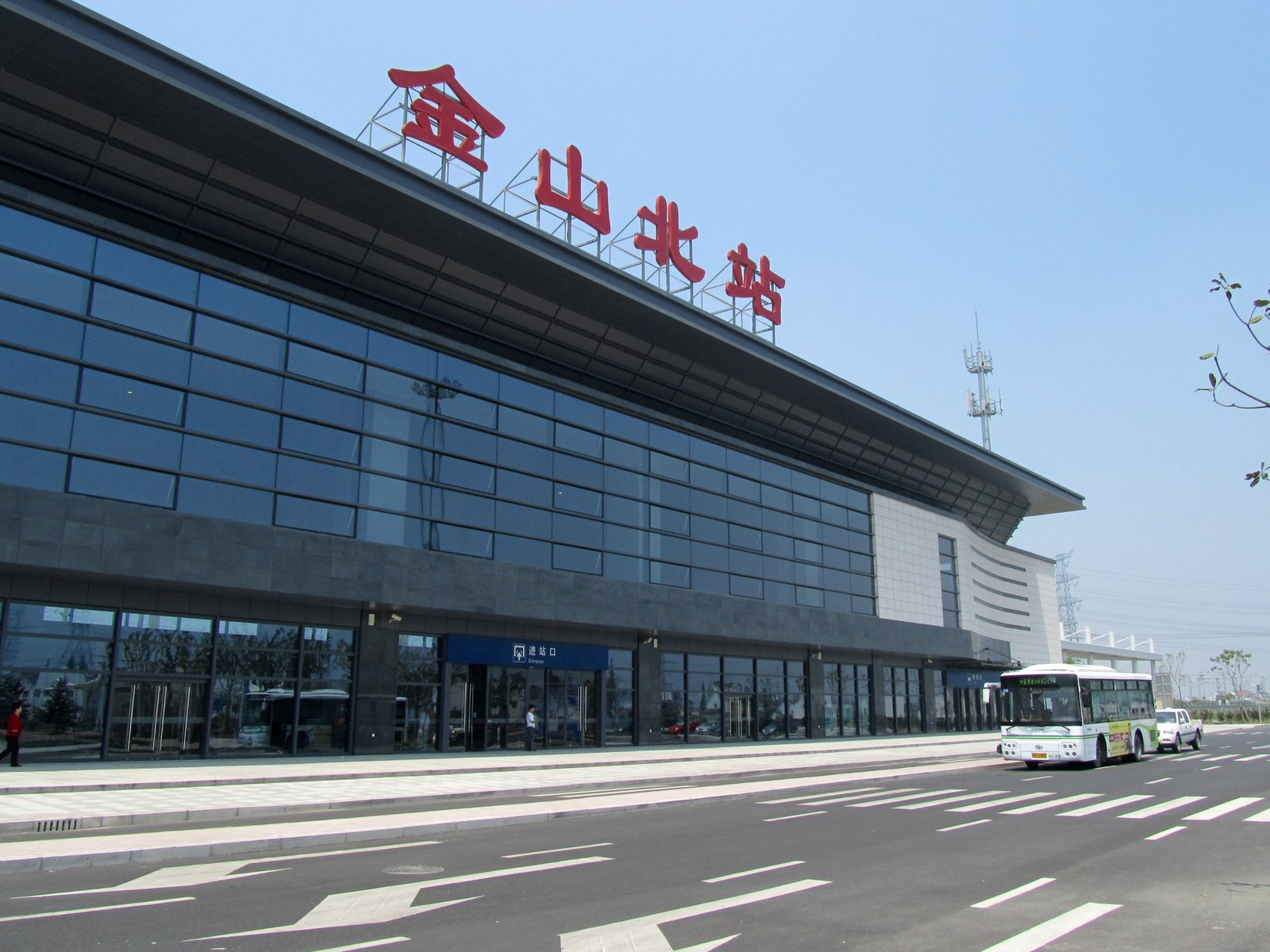

General information
- Other names: Jinshan North
- Location: Jinshan District, Shanghai; China
- Coordinates: 30°53′47″N 121°5′6″E
- Operated by: China Railway Corporation
- Line(s): Shanghai–Hangzhou high-speed railway

Other information
- Station code: TMIS code: 32019; Telegraph code: EGH; Pinyin code: JSB
- Classification: 3rd class station

History
- Opened: 26 October 2010

Jinshanbei (Jinshan North) railway station (Chinese: 金山北站; pinyin: jīn shān běi zhàn) is a railway station in Fengjing, Jinshan District, Shanghai, China. It is on the Shanghai–Hangzhou high-speed railway, also known as the Huhang Passenger Railway. The station opened on 26 October 2010. Legoland Shanghai opened on 5 July 2025, connected to the station 1 km away by 58 bus departures daily.

Preceding station	China Railway High-speed	Following station
Songjiang South towards Shanghai South or Shanghai Hongqiao	Shanghai–Hangzhou high-speed railway	Jiashan South towards Hangzhou
