= Jiashan South railway station =

Railway station in Jiaxing, China

Jiashannan 嘉善南
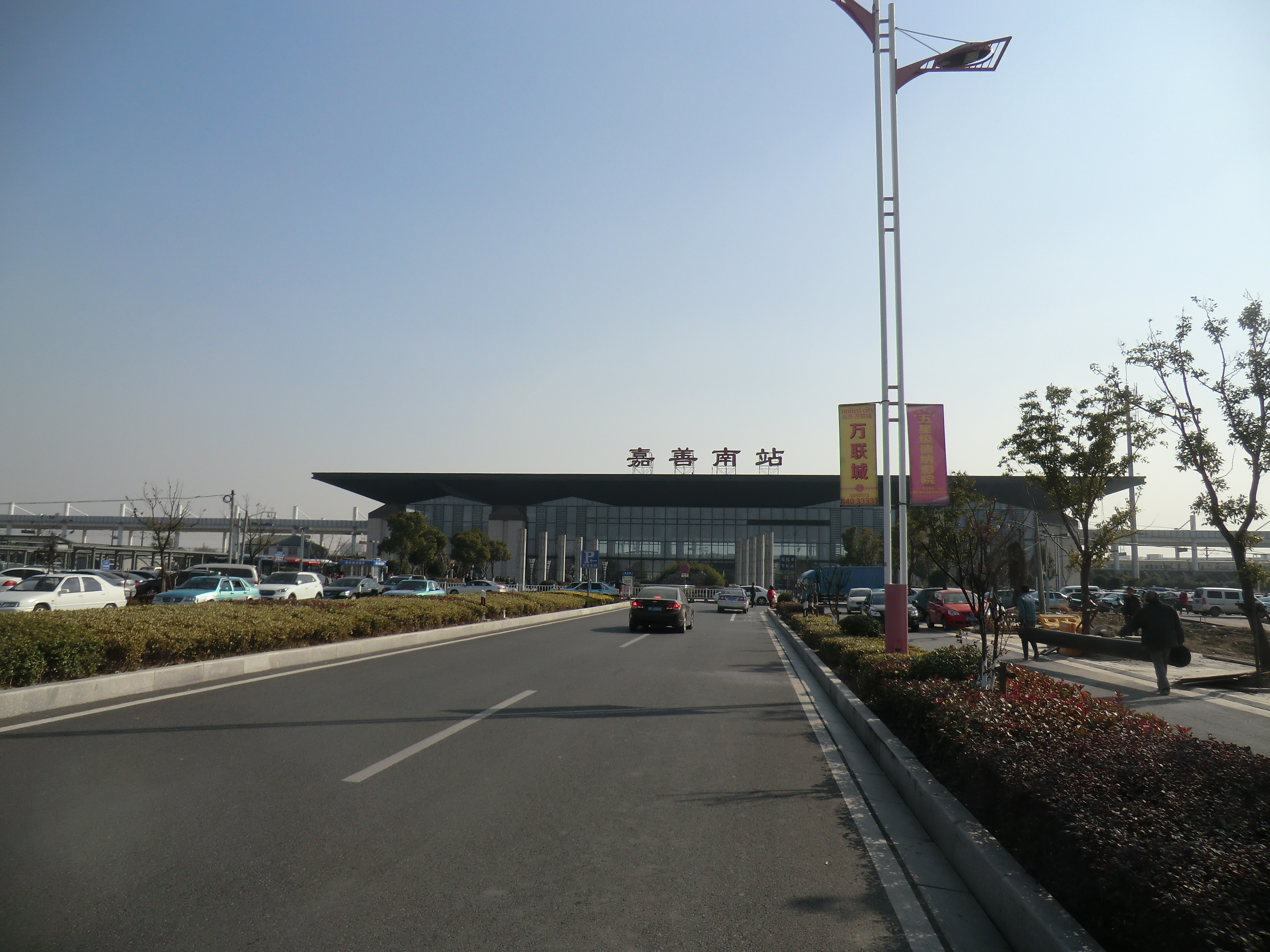

General information
- Other names: Jiashan South
- Location: Jiashan District, Jiaxing, Zhejiang; China
- Coordinates: 30°47′25″N 120°55′54″E
- Operated by: China Railway Corporation
- Line(s): Shanghai–Hangzhou high-speed railway

Other information
- Station code: TMIS code: 32016; Telegraph code: EAH; Pinyin code: JSN
- Classification: 3rd class station

History
- Opened: 26 October 2010

Jiashannan (Jiashan South) railway station (Chinese: 嘉善南站; pinyin: jiā shàn nán zhàn) is a railway station on the Shanghai–Hangzhou high-speed railway located in Zhejiang, China. It opened on 26 October 2010.

Preceding station	China Railway High-speed	Following station
Jinshan North towards Shanghai South or Shanghai Hongqiao	Shanghai–Hangzhou high-speed railway	Jiaxing South towards Hangzhou
