= Tongxiang railway station =

Railway station in Tongxiang, China

Tongxiang 桐乡
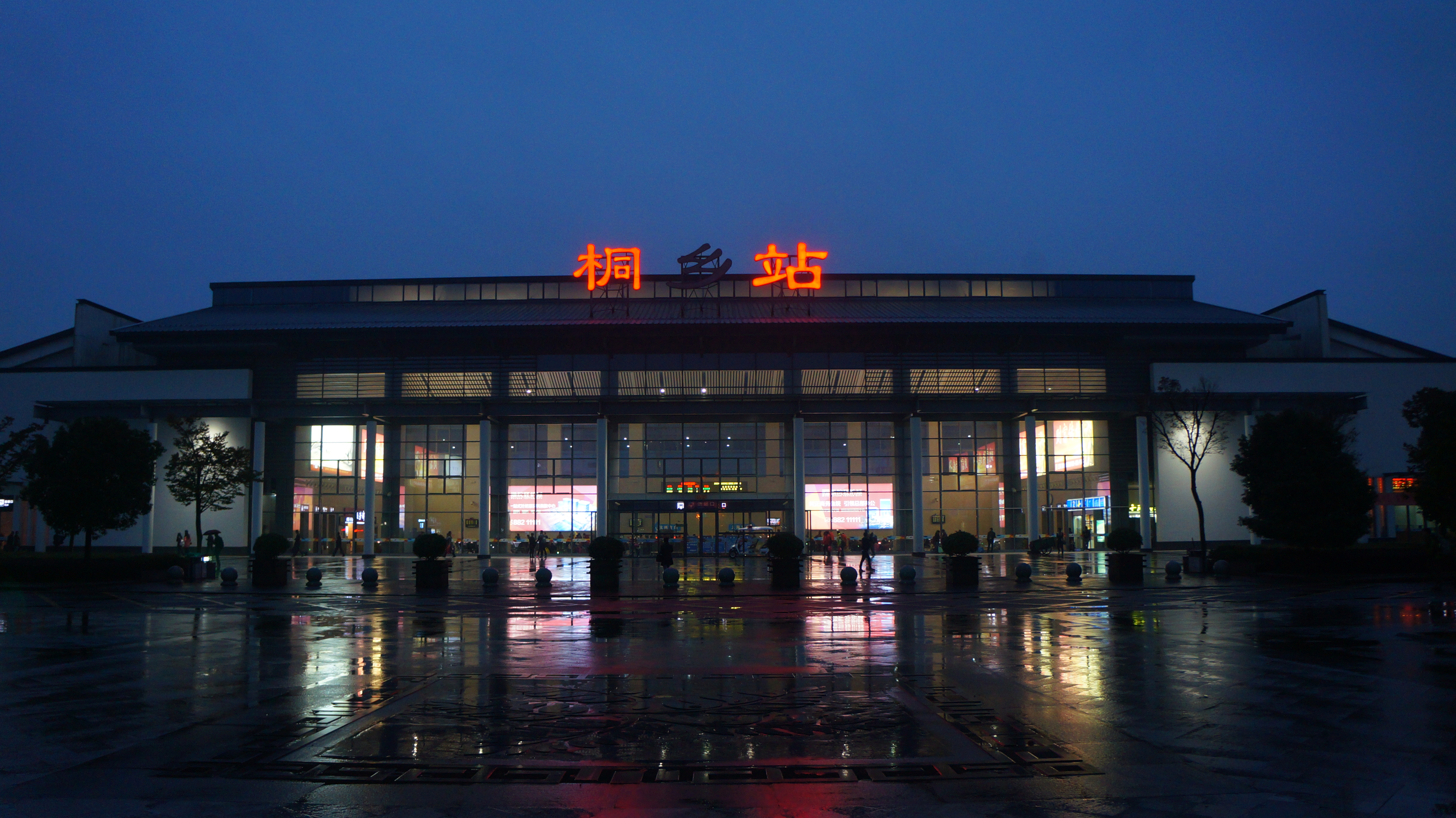
- Tongxiang Station's main building

General information
- Location: Tongxiang, Jiaxing, Zhejiang; China
- Coordinates: 30°32′22″N 120°33′49″E
- Operated by: China Railway Corporation
- Line(s): Shanghai–Hangzhou high-speed railway

Other information
- Station code: 32010 (TMIS code); TCH (telegram code); TXI (pinyin code)
- Classification: 3rd class station

History
- Opened: 26 October 2010

Tongxiang railway station
- Simplified Chinese: 桐乡站
Transcriptions
Standard Mandarin
- Hanyu Pinyin: Tóngxiāng Zhàn

Tongxiang railway station is a railway station on the Shanghai–Hangzhou high-speed railway located in northern Zhejiang, China. It is located south of Tongxiang, a city in Jiaxing Prefecture. It has two platforms, and is only served by high-speed EMU G and D trains. It opened on 26 October 2010.

Preceding station	China Railway High-speed	Following station
Jiaxing South towards Shanghai South or Shanghai Hongqiao	Shanghai–Hangzhou high-speed railway	Haining West towards Hangzhou
