= Linping South railway station =

Hangzhou Metro and railway station

Linpingnan 临平南
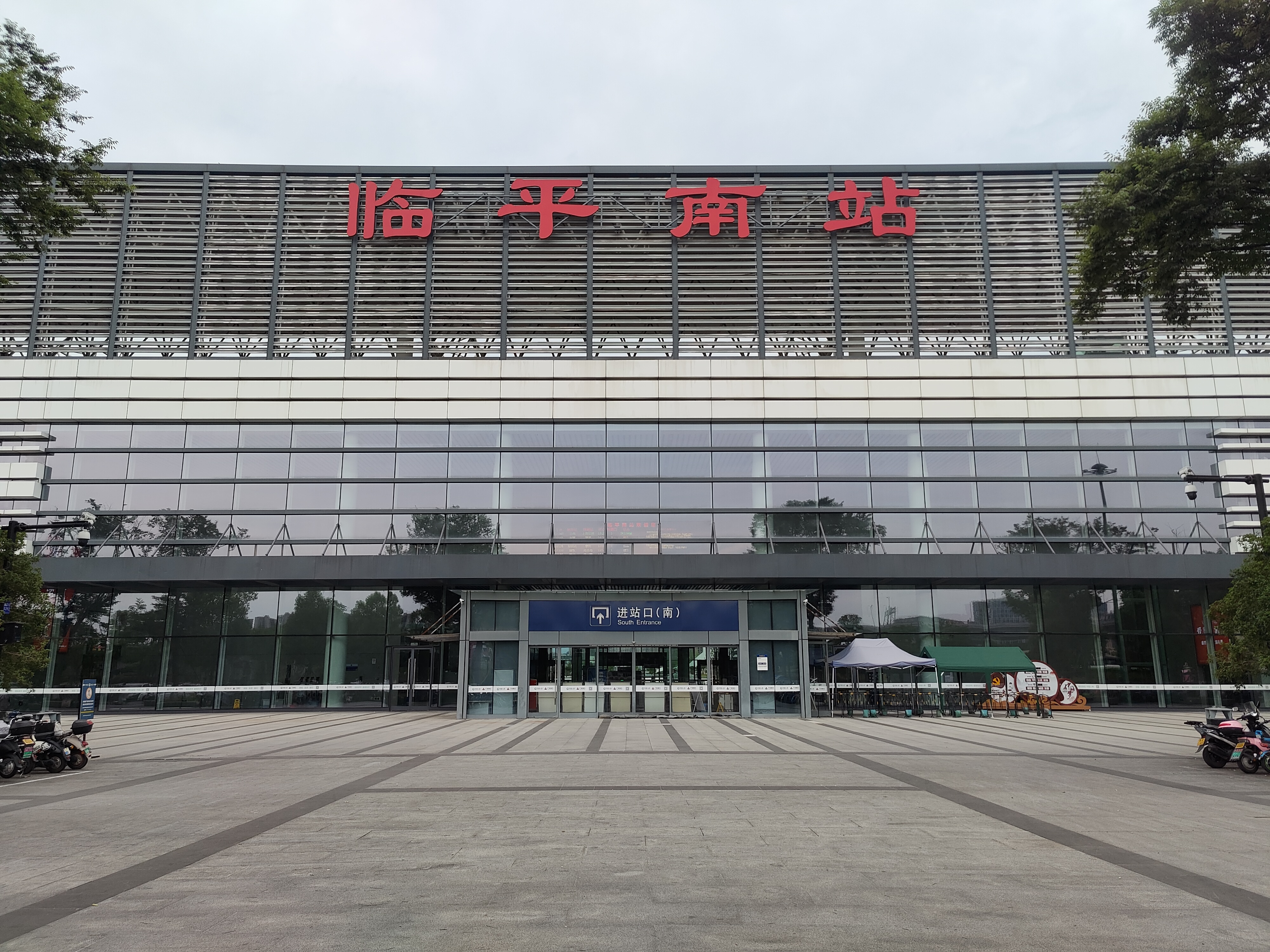
- South Square

General information
- Location: Linping District, Hangzhou, Zhejiang; China
- Coordinates: 30°22′59″N 120°17′30″E
- Operated by: China Railway Shanghai Group
- Line(s): Shanghai–Hangzhou high-speed railway; Hangzhou Metro; Line 9; Hangzhou–Haining Intercity Rail

Other information
- Station code: TMIS code: 32004; Telegraph code: EVH; Pinyin code: YHA
- Classification: 3rd class station

History
- Opened: October 26, 2010

Services
Preceding station	China Railway High-speed	Following station
Haining West towards Shanghai Hongqiao	Shanghai–Hangzhou high-speed railway Part of the Shanghai–Kunming high-speed railway	Hangzhou East Terminus
Haining West towards Shanghai Hongqiao	Shanghai–Hangzhou high-speed railway Part of the Shanghai–Kunming high-speed railway	Hangzhou Terminus
Preceding station	Hangzhou Metro	Following station
Wengmei towards Guanyintang	Line 9	Nanyuan towards Long'an
Preceding station	Hangzhou–Haining Intercity Rail	Following station
Terminus	Hangzhou–Haining Intercity Rail	Xucun towards International Campus, ZJU

Linpingnan (Linping South) railway station (Chinese: 临平南站; pinyin: Línpíngnán zhàn, formerly Yuhang railway station) is a railway station of the Shanghai–Hangzhou high-speed railway located in Linping District, Hangzhou, Zhejiang, China.

== History ==
The station opened on October 26, 2010 as Yuhang railway station. The name was changed to Linpingnan railway station on November 18, 2021.

== Metro station ==
This station is served by a station of the same name on Line 9 of the Hangzhou Metro and the Hangzhou–Haining Intercity Rail.

There is a police checkpoint at the Linpingnan Railway Station metro station. Passengers’ identity documents may be checked by the police when passing through the transfer corridor from the Hangzhou–Haining Intercity Rail to the Hangzhou Metro.

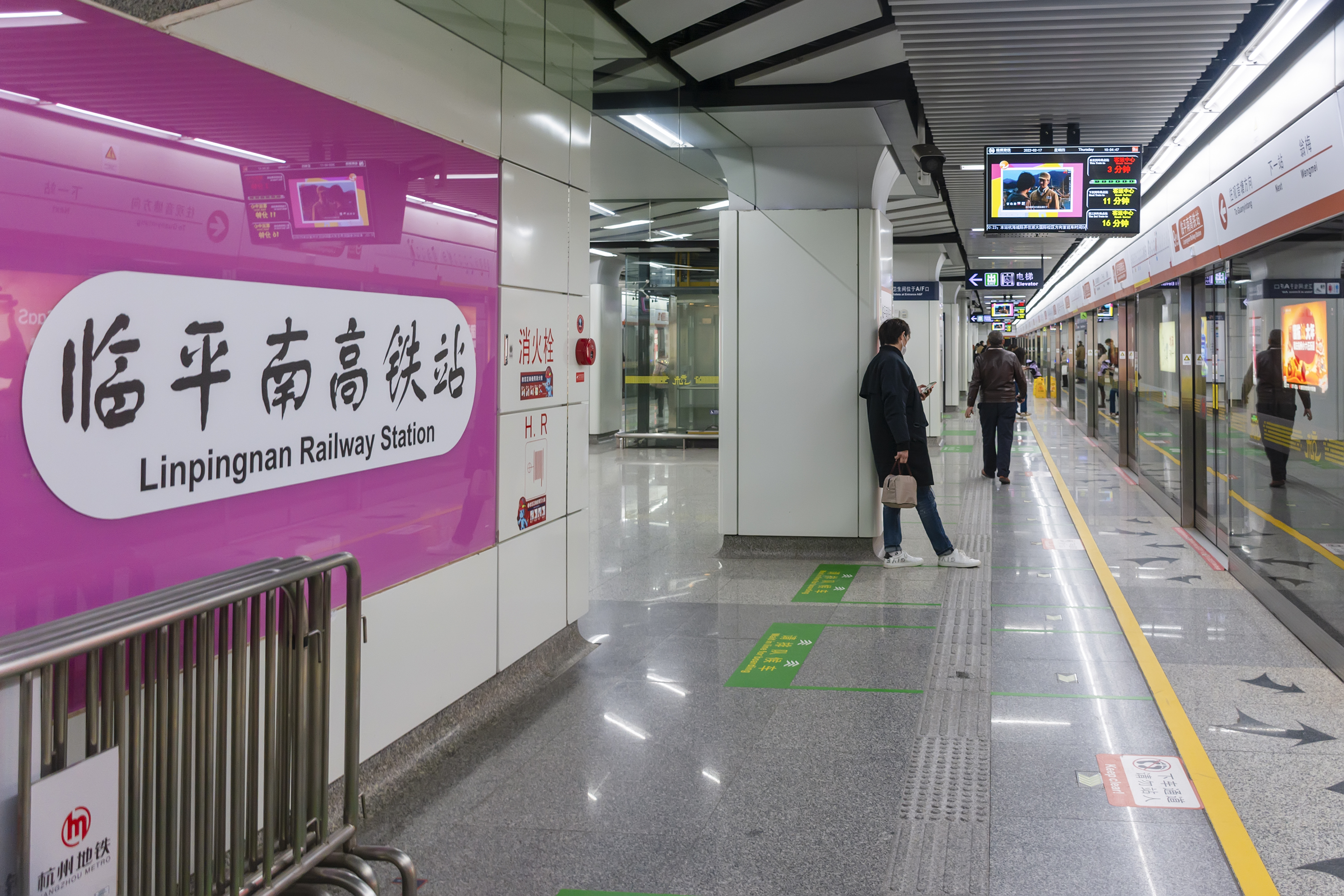
Platform of Hangzhou Metro Line 9 station
