= Huhang high-speed railway =

Huhang high-speed railway may refer to:

- Huzhou–Hangzhou high-speed railway, opening in late 2022
- Shanghai–Hangzhou high-speed railway, opened in 2010
