= Jiaxing railway station =

Railway station in Jiaxing, China

Jiaxing 嘉兴
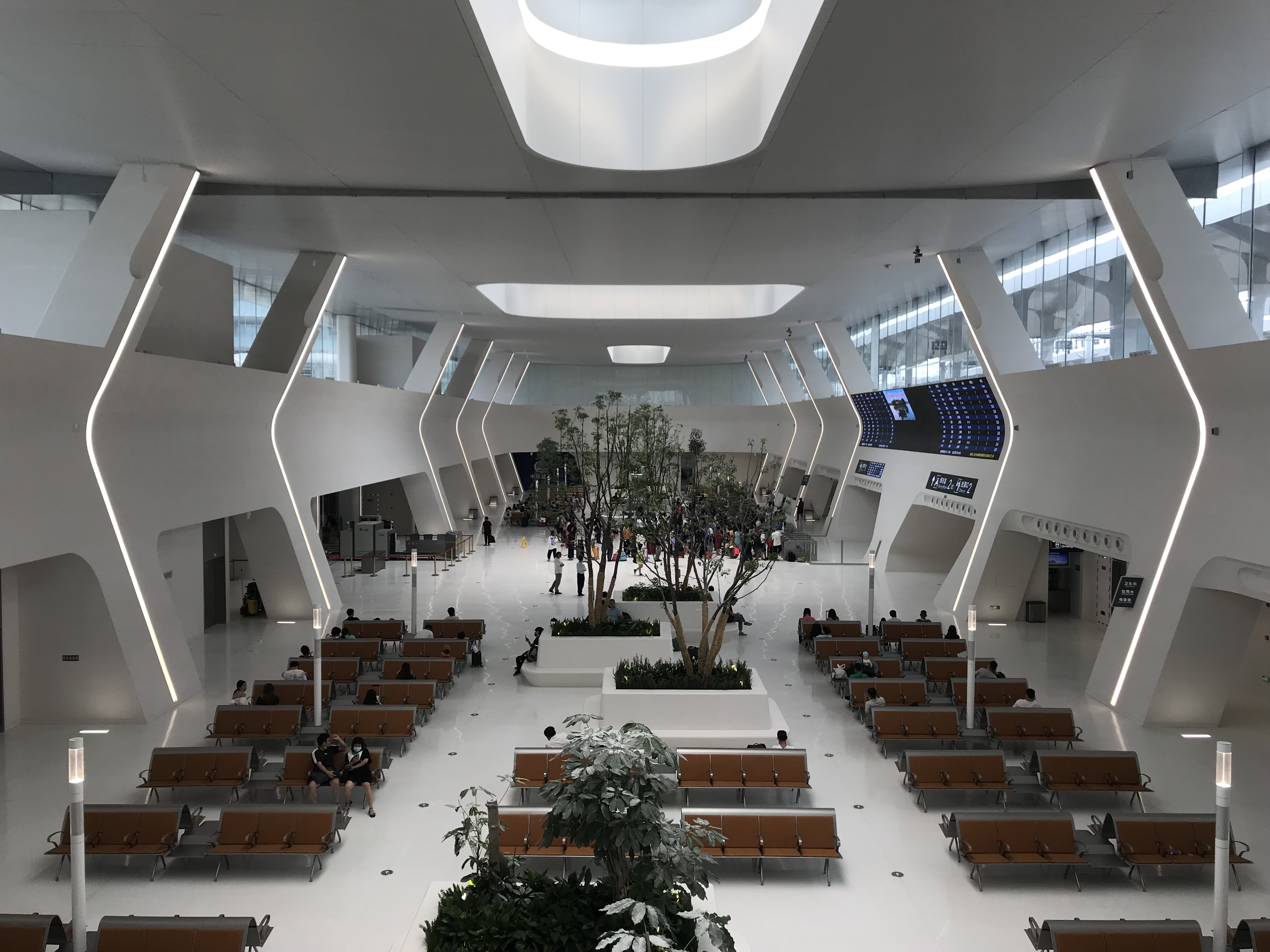
- South Waiting Area of Jiaxing Railway Station

General information
- Location: Nanhu District, Jiaxing, Zhejiang; China
- Coordinates: 30°45′53″N 120°45′50″E
- Operated by: China Railway Shanghai Group
- Line: Shanghai–Kunming railway

Construction
- Architect: Ma Yansong (MAD Studio)

History
- Opened: 1909; 25 June 2021 (after renovation)
Location

Jiaxing railway station (simplified Chinese: 嘉兴站; traditional Chinese: 嘉興站; pinyin: Jiāxīng Zhàn) is a railway station located in Nanhu District, Jiaxing, Zhejiang, People's Republic of China, on the Shanghai–Kunming railway. It handles all non-high-speed rail services for Jiaxing City. High-speed trains arrive at and depart from Jiaxing South railway station.

The station has 13 ticket windows, 6 VIP lounges, one quiet waiting room, one soft-seat waiting room, and 4 normal waiting rooms.

In 2007, Jiaxing railway station handled 31.1 million passengers and 28.5 million tons of cargo. The new station was put into operation on June 25, 2021.

== History ==
Jiaxing Station was built at the same time with the Shanghai-Hangzhou Railway in the 33rd year of Qing Guangxu (1907) and opened in 1909. The station building is located in Yangqiao Cave, Dongmen, Jiaxing Old Town, 110 kilometers away from Shanghai Station (North Station) and 91 kilometers away from Hangzhou Station. It was one of the largest stations on the Shanghai-Hangzhou Line at that time. When it was first built, the station house was two floors, covering an area of 4,800 square feet (446 square meters). The roof was renovated in 1915. The station has an upward side platform with a length of 650 feet and a width of 30 feet and an island platform with a length of 840 feet and a width of 27 feet. There is a floor between the two Road connections.

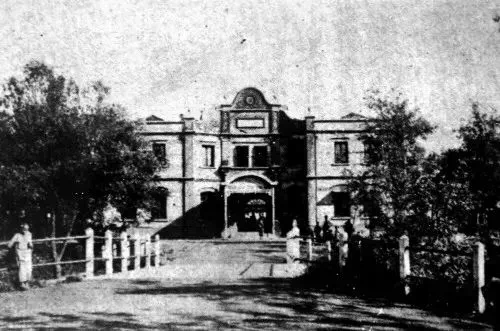
Jiaxin Station

station before renovation

On July 15, 1936, the Sujia Railway was connected to Jiaxing Station and demolished in 1944. On August 13, 1937, the battle between China, Japan and Shanghai broke out. From August 17 to October 23, Jiaxing Station began to be bombed seven times by the Japanese army, dropping a total of 68 bombs, causing a large number of casualties among railway workers and passengers. After many bombings, the station buildings were completely destroyed by war, and the entire railway line was interrupted. In 1938, the Japanese occupation authorities forced migrant workers and railway employees to rebuild the station building and build a turret bunker to preserve it to this day.

By 1969, Jiaxing Station had one main line, two arrival lines and three cargo lines, with a waiting area of 202 square meters. In 1976, the station modernized the passenger service facilities of the second-generation station room. A new ticket office with an area of 361 square meters was built, the waiting room area was increased to 657 square meters, and the private room was 562 square meters. Before the re-tracking of the Shanghai-Hangzhou Railway in 1990, the station had one main line, three arrival lines and seven cargo lines, two passenger platforms with a length of 500 meters, and three special lines .

Jiaxing Station used to be the central station under the jurisdiction of the Hangzhou Railway Branch of the Shanghai Railway Bureau, which is bounded by Jiashan Station under the jurisdiction of the Shanghai Railway Branch. Since 1978, it has been under the jurisdiction of the newly established Jiaxing Vehicle Service Section .

In 2009, the old station building of Jiaxing Station was listed as a municipal cultural protection unit, which is currently used by Jiaxing Railway Police Station.

== Jiaxing New Railway Station ==
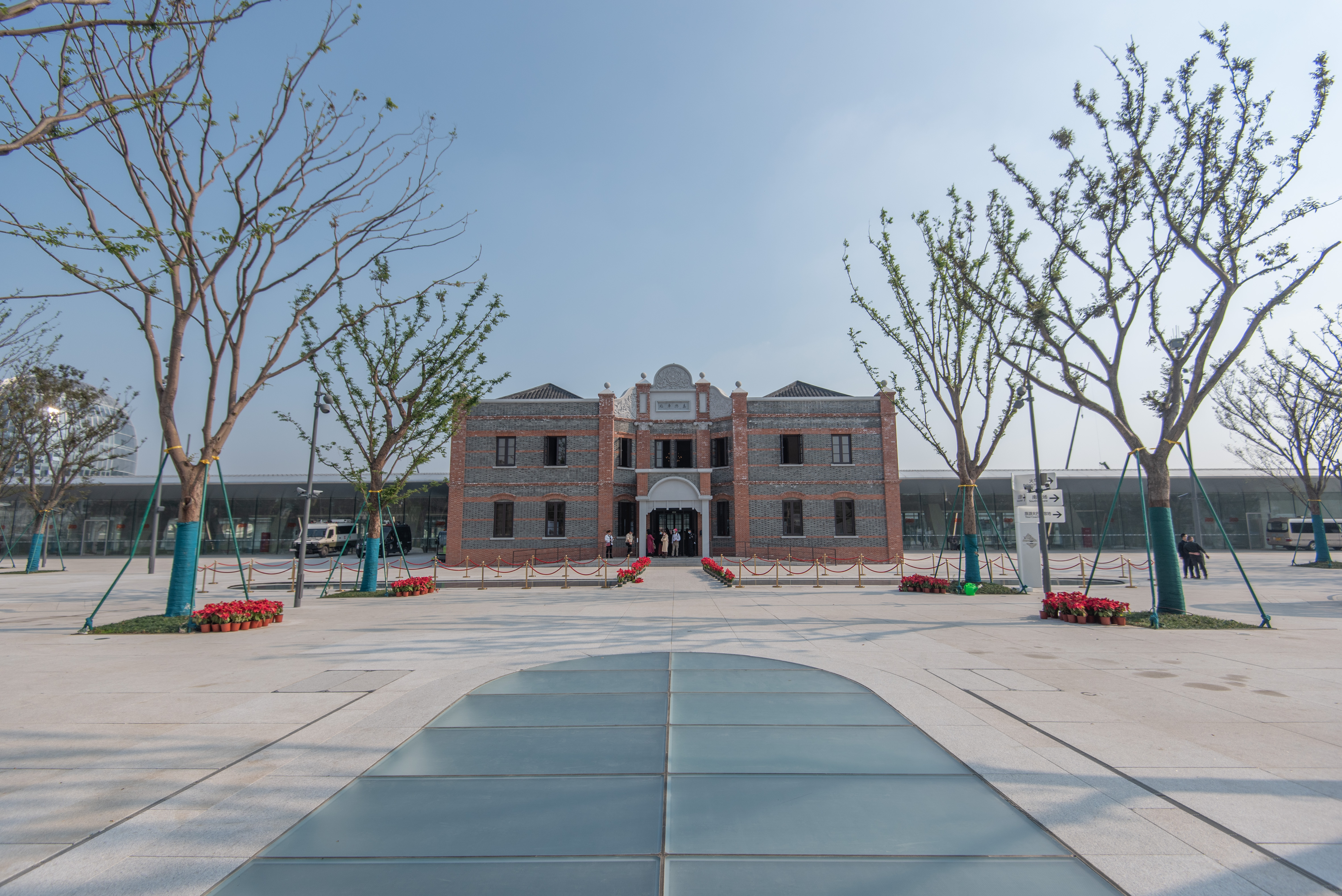
New Jiaxing Railway Station

In the "Approval on the Preliminary Design of the Shanghai-Hangzhou Re-Line" in 1975, the Ministry of Railways determined that Jiaxing Station will carry out passenger and cargo diversion and passenger station transformation in the construction of the Shanghai-Hangzhou Railway. The maximum number of people originally scheduled for the new station building will be 1,000, but later increased to 1,500 by In 1992, Jiaxing East Station was built on Lingtang Bridge to divert the freight business of Jiaxing Station. On February 12, 1996, the reconstruction project of Jiaxing Station began. Jiaxing New Passenger Station was completed on January 16, 1997, and put into operation on January 18.

The total construction area of Jiaxing New Station is 5045.14 square meters. Among them, the main station house is 3,861 square meters, with two floors: the first floor is the entrance hall, the waiting hall, the ticket office and the private room. Among them, the ticket hall has 13 ticket windows, with a private room area of 778.54 square meters; there are east and west waiting halls next to the entrance hall: one for trains to Shanghai, and the other for Hangzhou, with an area of 635 square meters, with 500 seats in each waiting hall; There is a soft-seat waiting room on the second floor, with an area of 100 square meters (180 square meters after renovation in 2010). After the renovation, the station has two main lines, two passenger to and one freight to and from, two passenger platforms, and tunnel connections between the two passenger platforms. The station has two special lines to Minfeng Paper Factory, Cold Storage and Grain Storage. Jiaxing New Passenger Station also has a station square of 8,800 square meters.

On July 1, 2006, Jiaxing Station started the N892 train to Shanghai. In the same year, the Minfeng special line and the grain depot special line were discontinued.

In January 2007, the Shanghai-Kunming Railway opened EMU trains, but due to limited equipment at Jiaxing Station, EMU trains could not stop at Jiaxing Station. After joint research by the Jiaxing Municipal Government and the Shanghai Railway Bureau, it was decided to implement the overall renovation and expansion project of Jiaxing Railway Station: the project includes the renovation of the 1-station high platform, the extension of the tunnel, and the use of the original truck to the departure line and the cargo yard area to build a new No. 5 high platform, the new Harmony waiting All moved to Jiaxing East Station: the station stopped freight business on April 15, 2007. On January 1, 2008, the first phase of the expansion and renovation of Jiaxing Station was completed, and the Harmony EMU began to stop at Jiaxing Station.

== North-South integration ==
In May 2008, the local government of Jiaxing began to discuss the follow-up renovation, including the expansion of the station square and station building, but the implementation did not start until 2019. According to relevant plans, the renovation of Jiaxing Station will rebuild the existing north station building and build a new south station building; and adjust the layout of the station yard to separate the uplink and downlink main lines and make two arrival and departure lines in the uplink and downlink directions to solve the current problem. The problem of insufficient receiving and dispatching capacity of uplink trains.

During the reconstruction period, the local government plans to divert the trains that stopped at Jiaxing Station to Jiashan Station and Haining Station. For this reason, the construction party first built a temporary waiting room at Jiashan Station from November 2019 to April 2020 to accommodate passenger flow; In addition, due to the need to occupy the square in front of the station for the renovation of Jiaxing Station, the local government built a new temporary hub station 500 meters away from the original station, which was opened on April 18, 2020. The station will suspend passenger services from May 6, 2020, to June 24, 2021, in order to cope with the renovation . During the suspension period, the temporary hub station of the railway station will open the connecting bus to Haining Station and Jiashan Station. From June 25, 2021, the station will resume passenger service. Initially, only the north square will be open to enter the station. The entrance to the south station building and the ticket office are expected to open at the end of 2021.

The Jiaxing Station Reconstruction Project, as one of the 100 major projects in Jiaxing City to welcome the 100th Anniversary of the Chinese Communist Party, was completed and put into use on June 25, 2021. In the initial stage, only the North Square will be open to enter the station. The entrance and ticket office of the south station building will open on January 1, 2022.

== Station structure ==
=== Station room ===
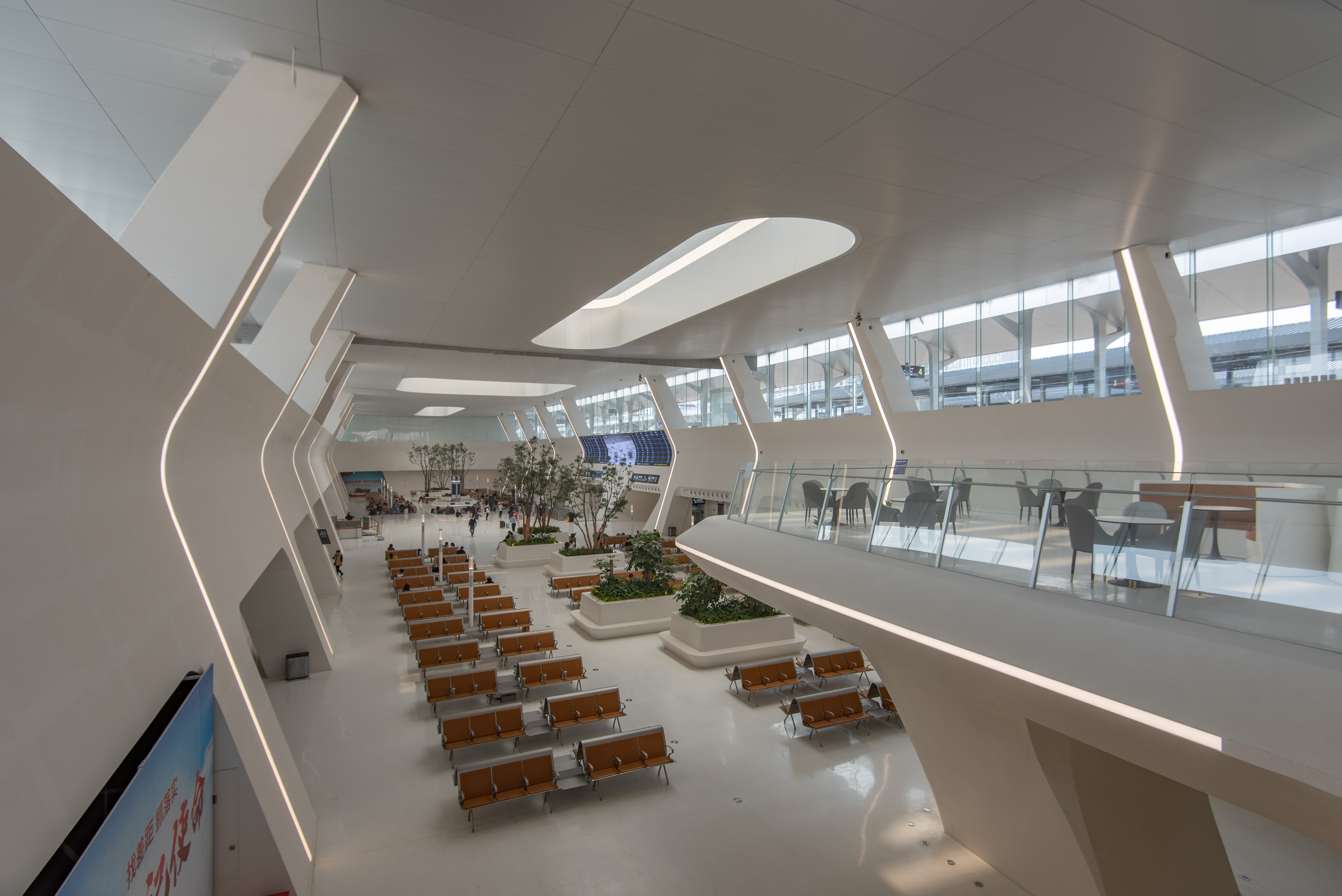
a spacious waiting area

The current station building and surrounding facilities of Jiaxing Station will be put into use in 2021, and will be planned and designed by MAD Architects led by Ma Yansong. There are two station buildings in the north and south of the station, both of which are arranged under the line side. Passengers enter and exit the station using the bottom-in and bottom-out mode, and the maximum number of people gathered per hour is 2,500. The facades of the two station buildings are decorated with aluminum-magnesium-manganese metal roof panels, and the roofs are paved with solar power generation photovoltaic modules with a total capacity of about 1.2 MW using building-integrated photovoltaic (BIPV) technology. Among them, the south station building is located on the south side of the line, with an area of 7,700 square meters. There is a station entrance 1 and a ticket office 1 (both temporarily closed), and a Jiaxing tram station is set up on the basement level. The waiting room of the south station building is mainly for the boarding and landing of train passengers bound for Hangzhou, and there is a ticket gate 1.

The north station building of Jiaxing Station is located on the north side of the line, where the original station building was built in 1997. The main body is located underground, with a construction area of 7,300 square meters, and the first-generation station building is restored at a 1:1 ratio on the ground in the middle. The "1921 Reconstruction Station Building" covers an area of 446 square meters and has 2 floors. It is a brick-wood structure with clear water brick walls. Nearly 130,000 pieces of blue and red bricks made of Nanhu lake heart mud were used in the reconstruction project of the old station building. The surface of some bricks was engraved with the words "Century of the founding of the party" and "Jiaxing 2021". "1921 Reconstruction Station There are steps and elevators in front of the room” leading to the entrance of the north station building on the basement floor. There are entrance 2 (north) and ticket office 2 (north). The waiting room of the north station room is mainly for trains bound for Shanghai. There is a ticket gate 2 for passenger boarding and landing.

platform	Side platform
1 platform	Shanghai-Kunming Railway to Shanghai (Jiaxing East Station)
Pass the line	Shanghai-Kunming Railway Uplink Train Passing Line
2 platform	Shanghai-Kunming Railway to Shanghai (Jiaxing East Station)

Island platform
3 platform	Shanghai-Kunming Railway to Kunming (Mawangtang Station)
Pass the line	Shanghai-Kunming Railway down train passes through the line
4 platform	Shanghai-Kunming Railway to Kunming (Mawangtang Station)

=== Stations ===
At the beginning of its establishment, the station had an ascending platform with a length of 198 meters and a width of 9 meters; an island platform with a length of 195 meters and a width of 8 meters, and a tunnel crossing the track. At the end of 2007, a new side-type high platform 5 was built, and the existing platform 1 was raised at the same time. In 2020, the station will be rebuilt to separate the uplink and downlink main lines, and two arrival and departure lines will be set in each direction. Between the north and south station buildings and each platform, there is a 4-meter-wide entry and exit tunnel.

==== around the station ====
In addition to the station building and station yard project, the renovation project of Jiaxing Station also includes the renovation of surrounding areas. Among them, the North Square connects the People's Park through artificial forestation, forming a "railway station in the forest"; a "dome"-shaped public commercial facility "Yu Jue" will be built near the South Square. In addition, the renovation project will also repair and transform the four cultural relics buildings in Xuangong Lane on the west side of the existing station into a historic district.

== Shuttle traffic ==
The traffic connection facilities at the North Square of Jiaxing Station are all located underground. On the B1 floor, there is a taxi pick-up and drop-off area and an online car-hailing parking area, which are connected to the railway entrance 2, ticket office 2 and exit 2. On the B2 floor, Chengdong Road Tunnel passes by. There is a pick-up and drop-off area and a bus stop "Jiaxing Railway Station North Square" in the auxiliary road of Chengdong Road. There are buses 4, 19, 22, 24, 1, 2, 5, 7, 9, 10, 31, 33, 89, 281, 51 nights, 52 nights, 56 nights, 58 nights, etc.; and connected to social vehicle parking garages, with A, B, C, D, E, 5 areas, a total of 218 parking spaces.

There is also the first and last bus station "Daxin Road Bus Hub Station" (formerly known as "Temporary Railway Station Hub Station") near the North Square.

Jiaxing Railway Station South Square East
serial number	route	Remark
2	Changsheng Garden Bus Terminal ⇆ Xiangdu Bus Terminal	
5	Changsheng Garden Bus Terminal ⇆ Red Boat College West (High School Park West)	
6	Jiaxing Railway Station Bus Junction Station ⇆ Jiaxing College Bus First and Last Station	
7	China-Hong Kong Business Center ⇆ Kaixi Road Bus Terminal	
9	Xiuzhou District Administrative Center Bus Junction Station ⇆ China-Hong Kong Business Center	
11	Jiaxing Railway Station Bus Hub Station ⇆ Neihe Port	Original 291
22	Jiaxing Railway Station Bus Hub Station ⇆ Bus Hexing North Road Station	
33	Xiuyuan Road Bus Junction Station ⇆ Municipal Vehicle Management Office	
35	Daxin Road Bus Junction Station ⇆ Shonan Bus First and Last Station	Original 292
55	Jiaxing North Bus Station West ⇆ Nanjiang Road Guangyi Road	
58	Daqiao Town Bus Hub Station ⇆ Yaohan Bus Hub Station	
82	Yaohan Bus Hub Station ⇆ The first and last bus station of E-Commerce Industrial Park	
87	Bus Hexing North Road Field ⇆ Bus East Field Junction Station	
89	Southwest Bus Junction Station (South of Municipal First Hospital) ⇆ Bus Dongchang Junction Station	
95	Daxin Road Bus Junction Station ⇆ Jiaxing South Railway Station	
150	Daxin Road Bus Junction Station ⇆ Jiashan Passenger Transport Center	
162	Daxin Road Bus Hub Station ⇆ Zhapu Bus Hub Station	
201	Yuxin Town Bus Junction Station ⇆ Daxin Road Bus Junction Station	Original 102 (first generation)
212	Xinhuang Bus Junction Station ⇆ Daxin Road Bus Junction Station	Original 103
223	Yuli ⇆ Daxin Road Bus Junction Station	Original106
233	Dayun ⇆ Daxin Road Bus Junction Station	Original 107, merged original 232
681	Youchegang Bus Hub Station ⇆ Jiaxing Railway Station Bus Hub Station	

North Square of Jiaxing Railway Station
Number	Route	Remarks
Tour 3 Child-friendly themed bus line	Xiuyuan Road Bus Hub Station ⇆ Daxin Road Bus Hub Station	
1	Jiaxing Automobile Passenger Transport Center ⇆ Ping An Home Bus First and Last Stop	
2	Changsheng Garden Bus First and Last Stop ⇆ Xiangdu Bus First and Last Bus Stop	
3	Daxin Road Bus Junction ⇆ Gaozhao Bus Hub Station	Through Xiuyuan Road, Zhongshan West Road (Mintai Bank), Weisheng Road, Zhongshan West Road
4	Jinjiabang Street Bus Station ⇆ Daxin Road Bus Hub Station	
5	The first and last bus stop of Changsheng Garden ⇆ Red Boat College West (West of High School Park)	
7	China-Hong Kong Trade Center ⇆ The first and last bus stop of Kaixi Road	
9	Xiuzhou District Administrative Center Bus Hub Station ⇆ China-Hong Kong Trade Center	
10	The first and last bus stops of Happy Home⇆ Zhou'an Road Bus Hub	
19	Daxin Road Bus Hub Station ⇆ Jiaxing Automobile Passenger Transportation Center	36 offices of Zhongdian Science and Technology, Municipal Talent Apartment
Interval 19	Daxin Road Bus Hub Station ⇆ Jiaxing Airport	
24	Zhou'an Road Bus Hub Station ⇆ Daxin Road Bus Hub Station	Jinglanshan Road Zhengyuan Road, east of Yuehe Historic District Merge the original 54
31	Jiacheng Lvdu Bus Hub Station ⇆ Yaojiadang Experimental Primary School	
33	Xiuyuan Road Bus Hub Station ⇆ Municipal Vehicle Management Office	
51	Jiaxing Automobile Passenger Transportation Center ⇆ Daxin Road Bus Hub Station	Through the Lianglin Campus of Jiaxing College and Jishui Road Farmers' Market 19 night shift
52	Daxin Road Bus Junction ⇆ Gaozhao Bus Hub Station	Through Longsheng Road, Xiuyuan Road, Honggao Road and Xiuxin Road 3 Night shift
55	West of Jiaxing North Bus Station ⇆ Nanjiang Road Guangyi Road	
56	Junli Road, Rongjia Road⇆ City Library	
58	Daqiao Town Bus Hub Station ⇆ Baiban Bus Hub Station	
89	Southwest Bus Hub Station (City's First Hospital South) ⇆ Bus Dongchang Hub Station	
101	Fengqiao Town Bus Hub Station ⇆ Daxin Road Bus Hub Station	Original Tour 1
161	Jiaxing North Bus Station ⇆ Pinghu Passenger Transportation Center	
171	Jiaxing North Bus Station ⇆ Haiyan Passenger Transportation Center	
222	Xinfeng Town Bus Hub Station ⇆ Daxin Road Bus Hub Station	Original 109
281	Yuquan Road Bus Station ⇆ Oil Truck Port Bus Hub	Original 38

Preceding station	China Railway	Following station
Jiaxing East towards Shanghai or Shanghai South	Shanghai–Kunming railway	Mawangtang towards Kunming
