= Haining West railway station =

Railway station in Jiaxing, China

Hainingxi 海宁西
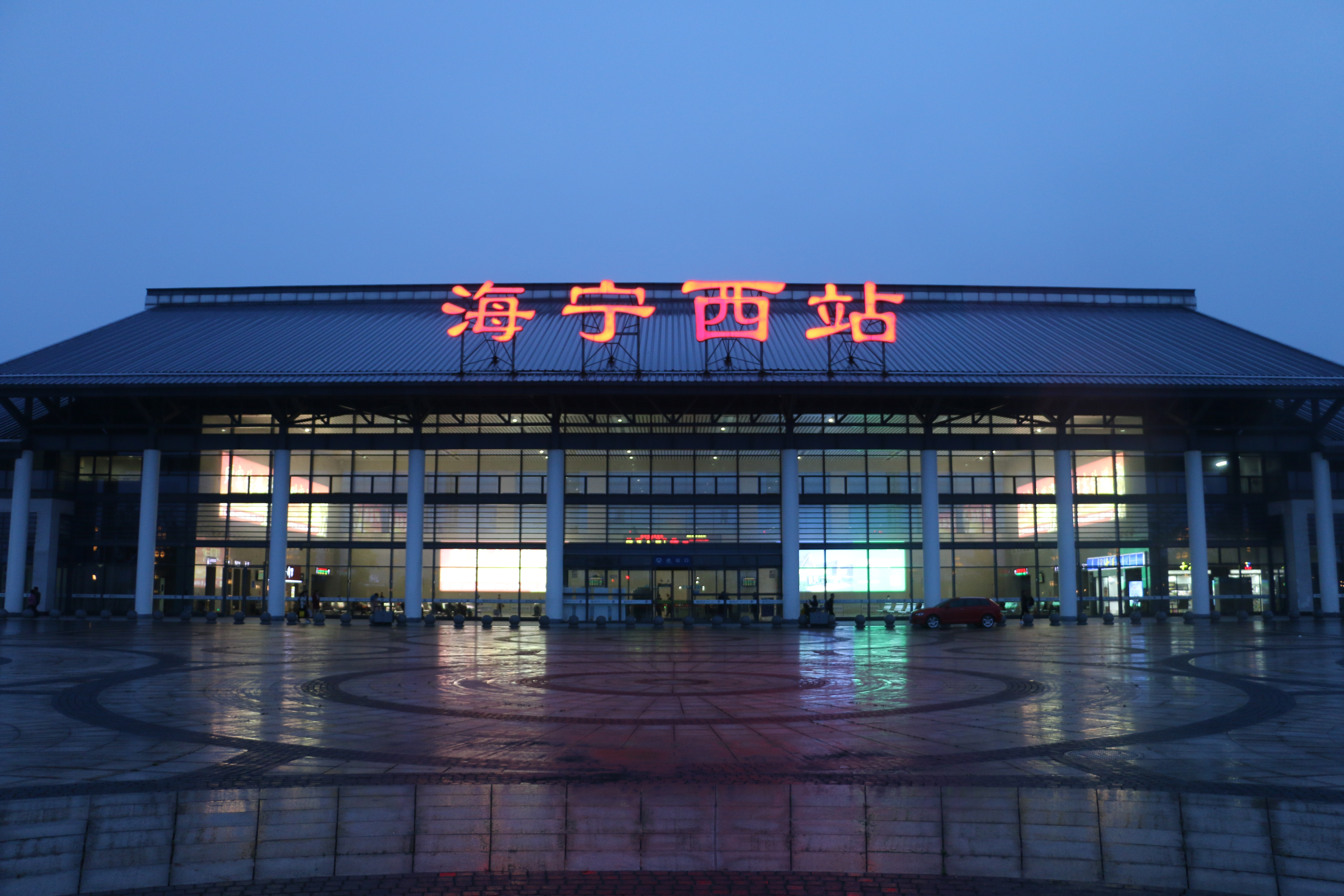

General information
- Other names: Haining West
- Location: Haining, Jiaxing, Zhejiang; China
- Coordinates: 30°26′27″N 120°23′14″E
- Operated by: China Railway Corporation
- Line(s): Shanghai–Hangzhou high-speed railway; Hangzhou–Haining Intercity Rail

Other information
- Station code: TMIS code: 32007; Telegraph code: EUH; Pinyin code: HNX
- Classification: 3rd class station

History
- Opened: 26 October 2010; 14 years ago

Hainingxi (Haining West) railway station (simplified Chinese: 海宁西站; traditional Chinese: 海寧西站; pinyin: Hǎiníng xī zhàn) is a railway station on the Shanghai–Hangzhou high-speed railway located in Haining, Jiaxing, Zhejiang, China. It opened on 26 October 2010, ushering in the era of high-speed rail in Haining.

== Commuter rail station ==
Hainingxi Railway Station on the Hangzhou-Haining Intercity Rail. It is located adjacent to the high-speed railway station.

Preceding station	China Railway High-speed	Following station
Tongxiang towards Shanghai Hongqiao	Shanghai–Hangzhou high-speed railway Part of the Shanghai–Kunming High-Speed Railway	Linping South towards Hangzhou
