= Legoland Sichuan =

Resort in Sichuan

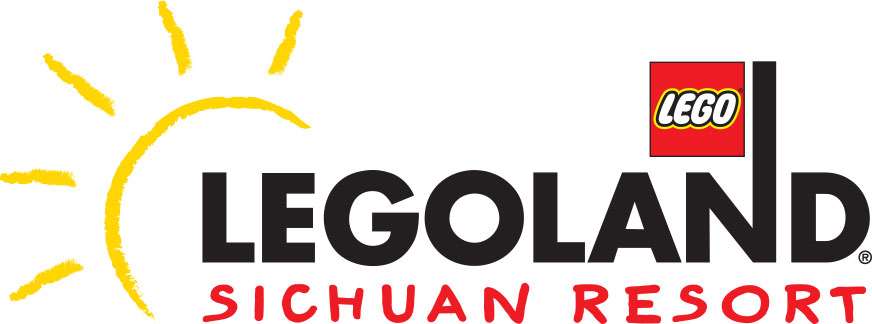
- Legoland Sichuan Resort logo
- Location: Shigao, Tianfu New Area, Sichuan, China.
- Status: Under construction
- Owner: Global Zhongjun Cultural Tourism Development Co., Ltd and Merlin Entertainments
- Operated by: Merlin Entertainments
- Theme: Lego
- Area: 57 hectares

Attractions
- Total: TBA
- Roller coasters: 4
- Water rides: 1

Legoland Sichuan is an upcoming theme park and resort located in Shigao, Sichuan, China. The resort started construction on June 8, 2020, and was planned to open in 2025. As of 2026, construction of the park remains on hold until further notice.

== Plans ==
The project is led by Merlin Entertainment. On 27 September 2019, Merlin and Global Zhongjun announced a Legoland Resort in Sichuan Province. The resort was scheduled to open in 2023, however, it was pushed back to 2025, before being delayed again.

The resort area covers 57 hectares, with a building area of 159,000 square metres spread over 10 themed areas. The estimated construction cost is CN¥3 billion (US$412 million).

== Construction progress ==
- On February 6, 2018, Global Zhongjun Cultural Tourism Development Co., Ltd and The Chengdu Global Century – Exhibition & Travel Group signed project agreement with Merlin Entertainments.
- On September 16, 2019, the Legoland Sichuan project ceremony was held at the Lego headquarters in Billund, Denmark.
- On September 27, 2020, Merlin Entertainments announced that it has entered into a partnership agreement with Global Zhongjun Cultural Tourism Development Co., Ltd ("Global Zhongjun") to build and operate a Legoland Resort in Sichuan.
- On June 8, 2020, Legoland Sichuan Resort started construction.
- On October 22, 2021, the General Manager of Merlin Entertainments (Southwest China), said the resort will include a Legoland theme park, a Legoland Water Park and two Legoland hotels with a total of 500 rooms.
- As of 2026, the park's construction has been paused until further notice and the announced 2025 opening year missed.

== See also ==
- Legoland Shanghai
- Universal Beijing
- Universal Studios Beijing
- Shanghai Disneyland
- Shanghai Disney Resort
