= Legoland Shanghai =

Amusement park in Shanghai, China

Legoland Shanghai Resort
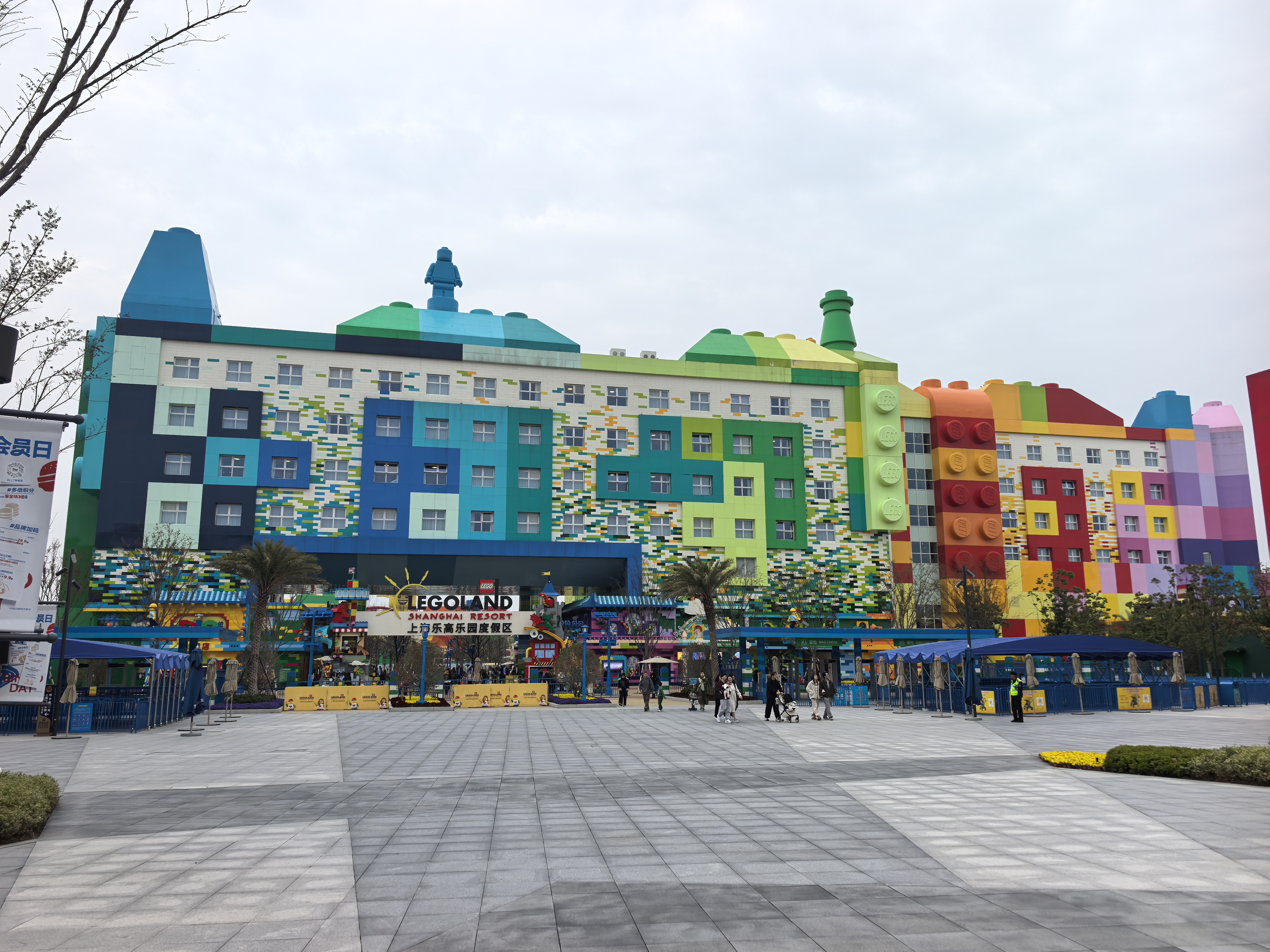
- Main entrance of Legoland Shanghai
- Interactive map of Legoland Shanghai Resort
- Location: China Fengjing, Jinshan disctrict, Shanghai
- Coordinates: 30.88598°N 121.09116°E
- Status: Operating
- Opened: July 5, 2025
- Owner: Shanghai Jinshan Urban Investment Group and Merlin Entertainments
- Operated by: Merlin Entertainments
- Theme: Lego
- Operating season: Year-round
- Area: 318,000 m^{2} (3,420,000 sq ft)

Attractions
- Total: 35
- Website: Official website

Legoland Shanghai Resort is a theme park located in Fengjing, Jinshan district, Shanghai, China. It is operated by Merlin Entertainments of the United Kingdom. Construction began on November 17, 2021, and the park opened on July 5, 2025. It was the first Legoland theme park in China and fourth in Asia (after the Legoland Malaysia, Legoland Japan and Legoland Korea), and the eleventh worldwide.

The resort spans 318,000 square meters with an investment of 3.6 billion RMB. It includes the Legoland theme park and a Lego-themed hotel. It is the largest Legoland park worldwide.

== History ==
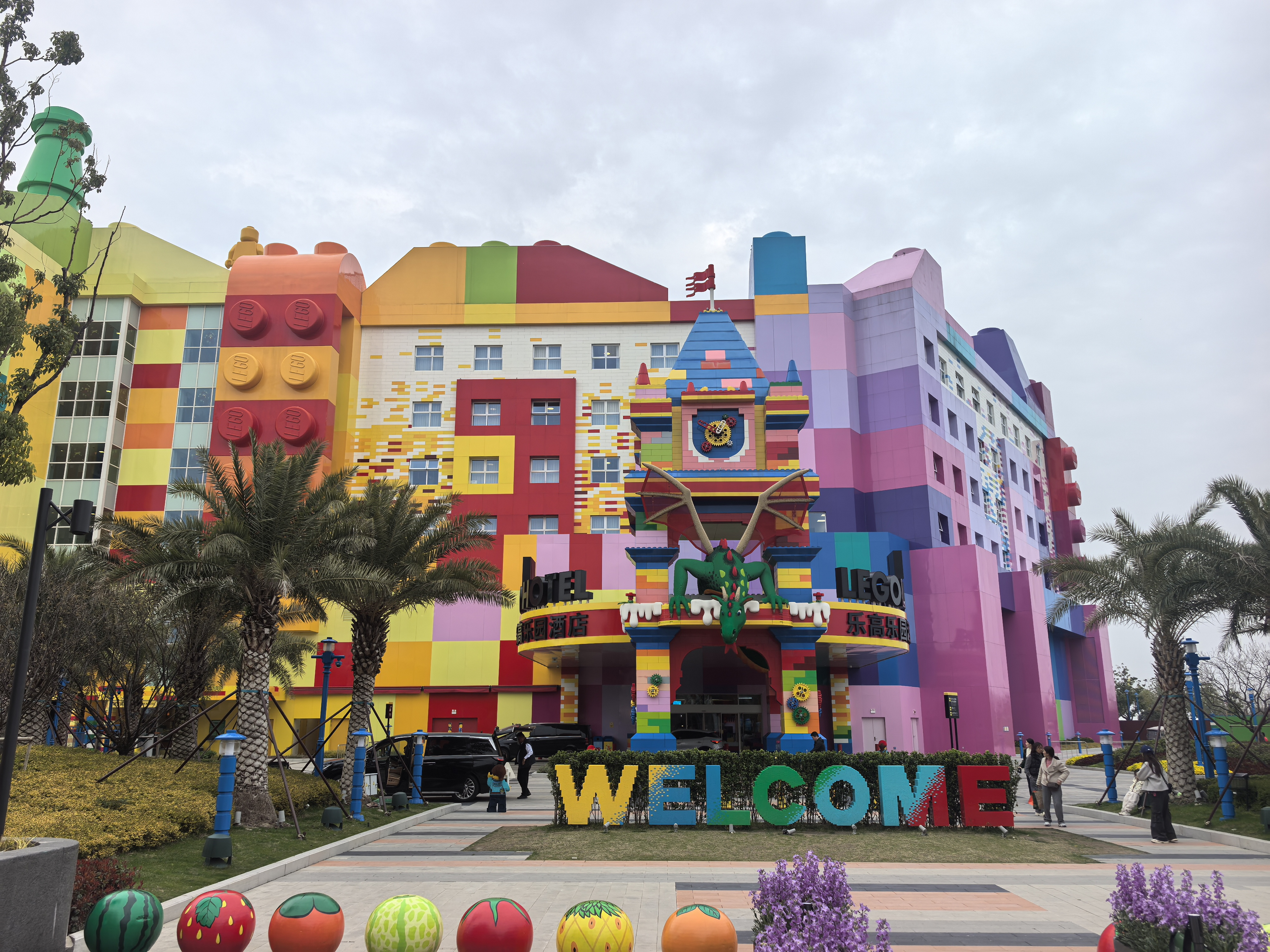
Legoland Hotel

Originally planned for Dianshan Lake in Qingpu, Shanghai, the park was expected to begin construction in 2020 and open in 2022.

On November 6, 2019, during the 2nd China International Import Expo, Jinshan District signed an agreement with The Lego Group, Merlin Entertainments, and CMC Inc. to officially locate the resort in Jinshan.

On October 9, 2020, the resort was confirmed to be located in Fengjing, near Jinshan North railway station. The project is jointly funded by Shanghai Jinshan Urban Investment Group, Merlin Entertainments, KIRKBI Invest A/S, and CMC Inc., with a total investment of USD $550 million.

Construction began on November 17, 2021. Trial operations started June 20, 2025, with the official opening on July 5, 2025.

== Resort features ==
=== Legoland Theme Park ===
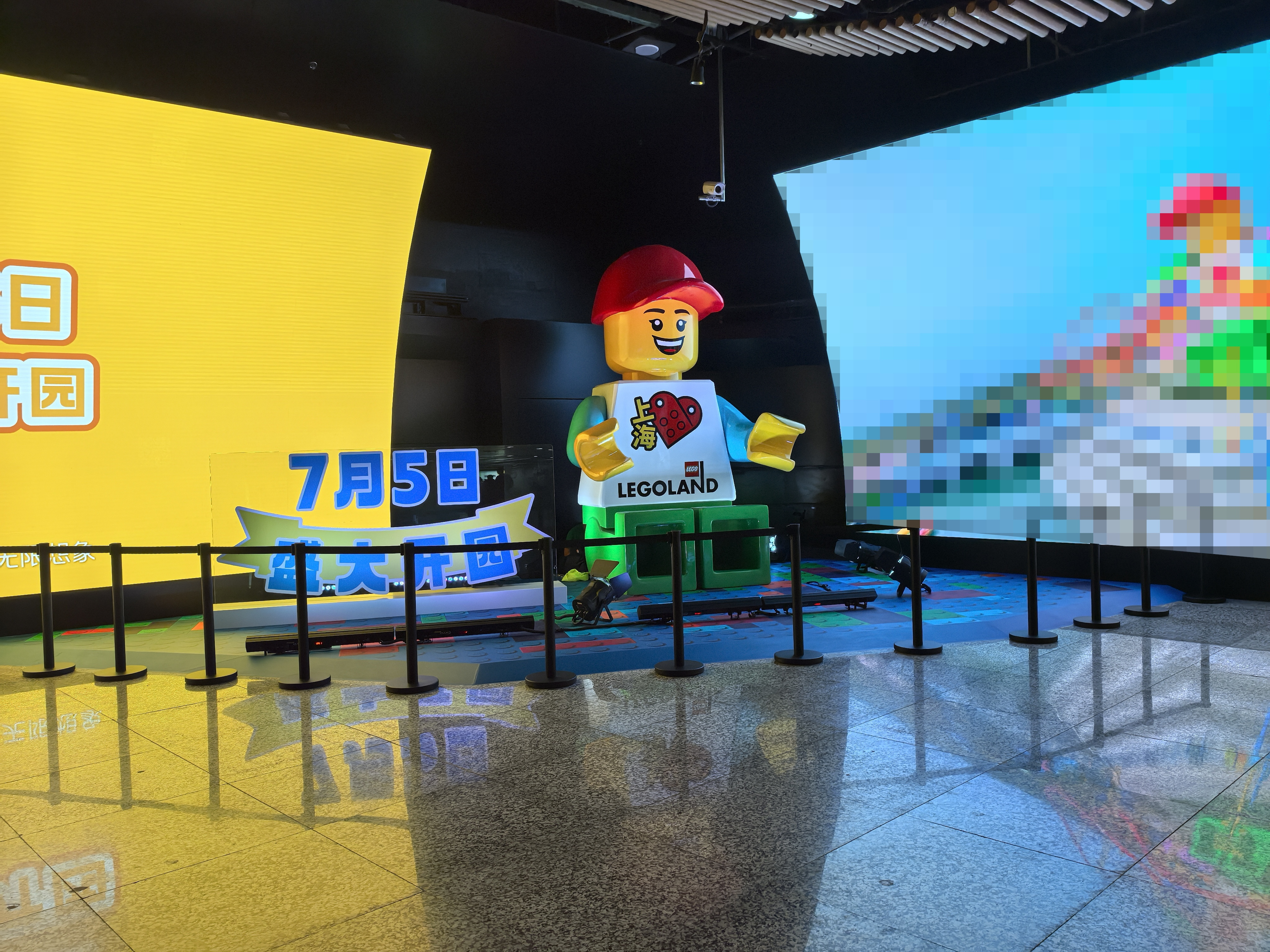
Promotion for the opening of Legoland Shanghai at Xujiahui station.

The theme park, the second-largest Legoland globally and the first in mainland China, includes eight themed areas, over 75 interactive attractions, and several world-first features such as:

- "Big Lego Coaster" – a Bolliger & Mabillard inverted roller coaster inspired by Lego brick design
- "Dragon" and "Dragon's Apprentice" – a Zierer and Zamperla family roller coaster for older kids and younger children respectively
- A 60-meter Lego-style observation tower
- The world's first Monkey King-themed attraction inspired by Journey to the West and Lego's Monkie Kid series

The site also includes a smart parking system with 1,700 spaces.

=== Legoland Hotel ===
Located near the park, the Legoland Hotel Shanghai is decorated with 450 Lego brick models and has 250 themed rooms.

== Tickets ==
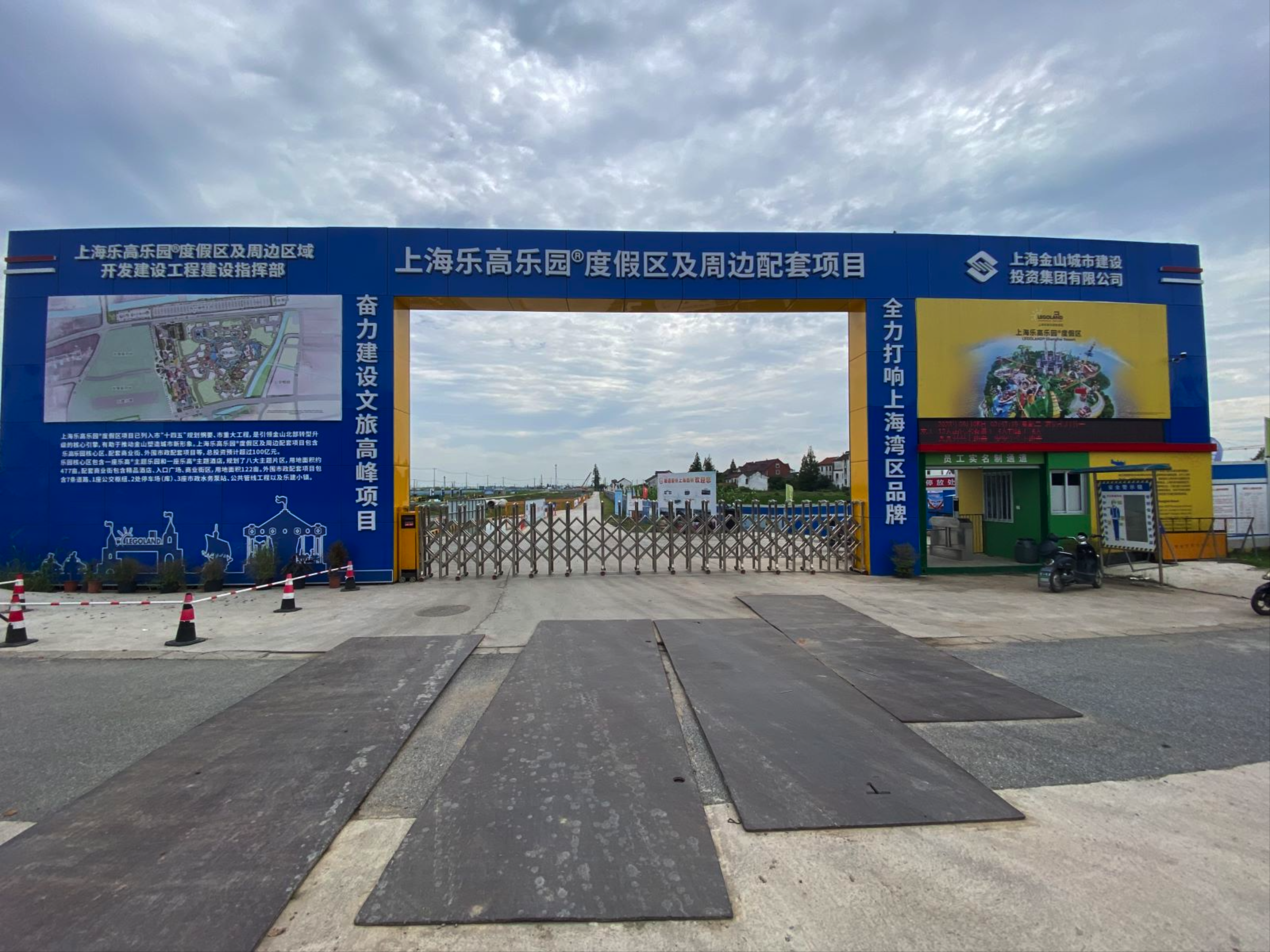
Legoland under construction (2023)

Legoland Shanghai uses a tiered pricing system:

- Off-peak: ¥319
- Standard weekdays: ¥379
- Peak dates: up to ¥599

Tickets went on sale on May 28, 2025.

== Transportation ==
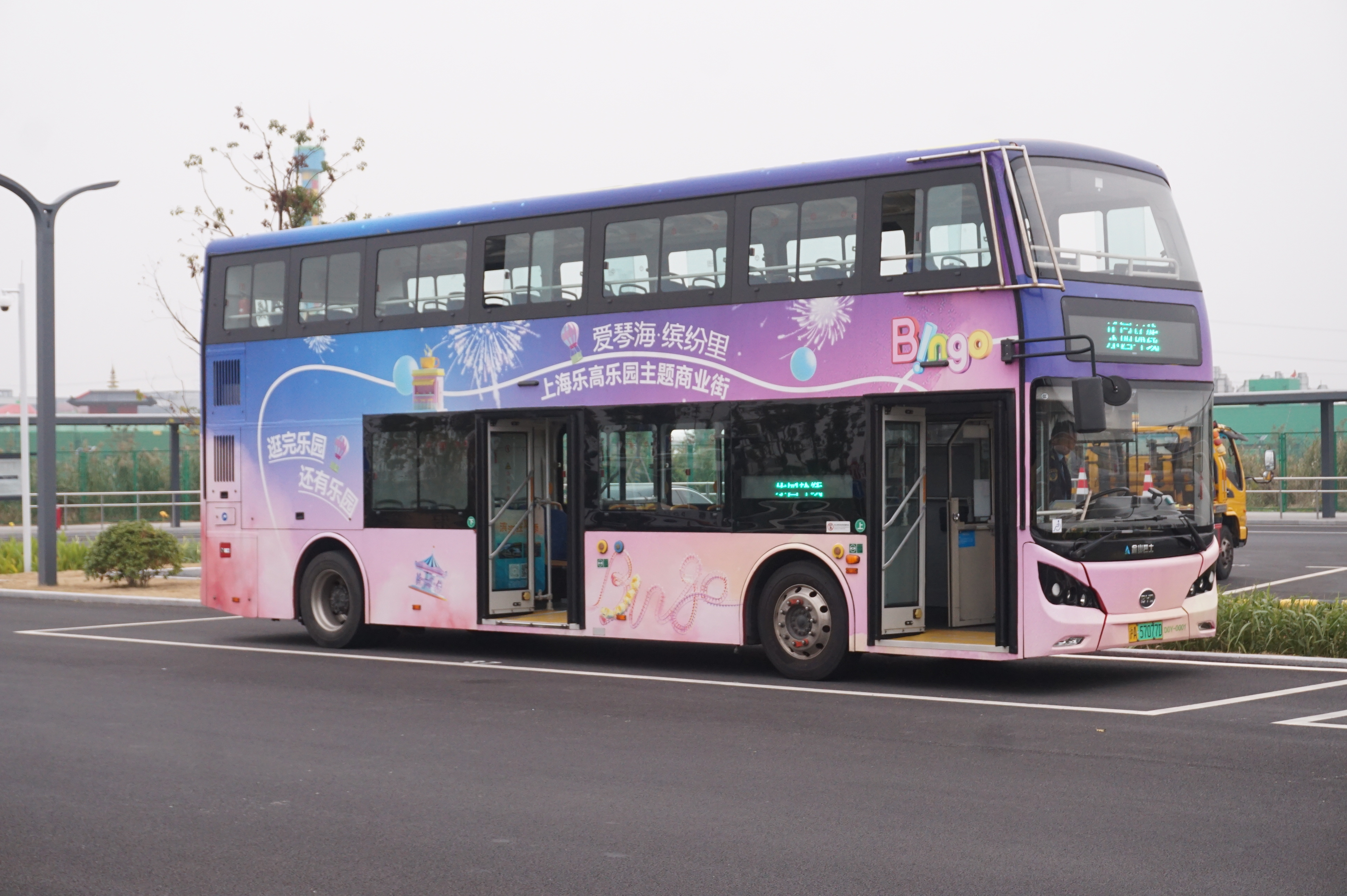
Legoland loop bus line, using a BYD K9S double-decker bus

Located 1 km from Jinshan North railway station. A special bus loop with 58 daily departures connects the station directly to the park as of June 10, 2025.

Bus routes from both Shanghai and nearby Jiaxing (e.g. Pinghu and Jiashan) have been updated to serve the resort.

== Investment and operations ==
Videovisit to the park.

The project is managed through a joint venture among Shanghai Jinshan Urban Investment Group, Merlin Entertainments, KIRKBI Invest A/S, and CMC Inc. A dedicated management company will operate the resort.

As part of the agreement:

- Merlin Entertainments receives a one-time development service fee.
- Annual licensing fees are paid for the Legoland and Merlin brands, based on park revenue.
- An annual operations management fee is also paid to the management company.

== See also ==
- Legoland Sichuan
- Universal Beijing
- Universal Studios Beijing
- Shanghai Disneyland
- Shanghai Disney Resort
