= Tongxiang =

City in China

Tongxiang 桐乡市 Tunghiang
- County-level city
- Wuzhen in Tongxiang

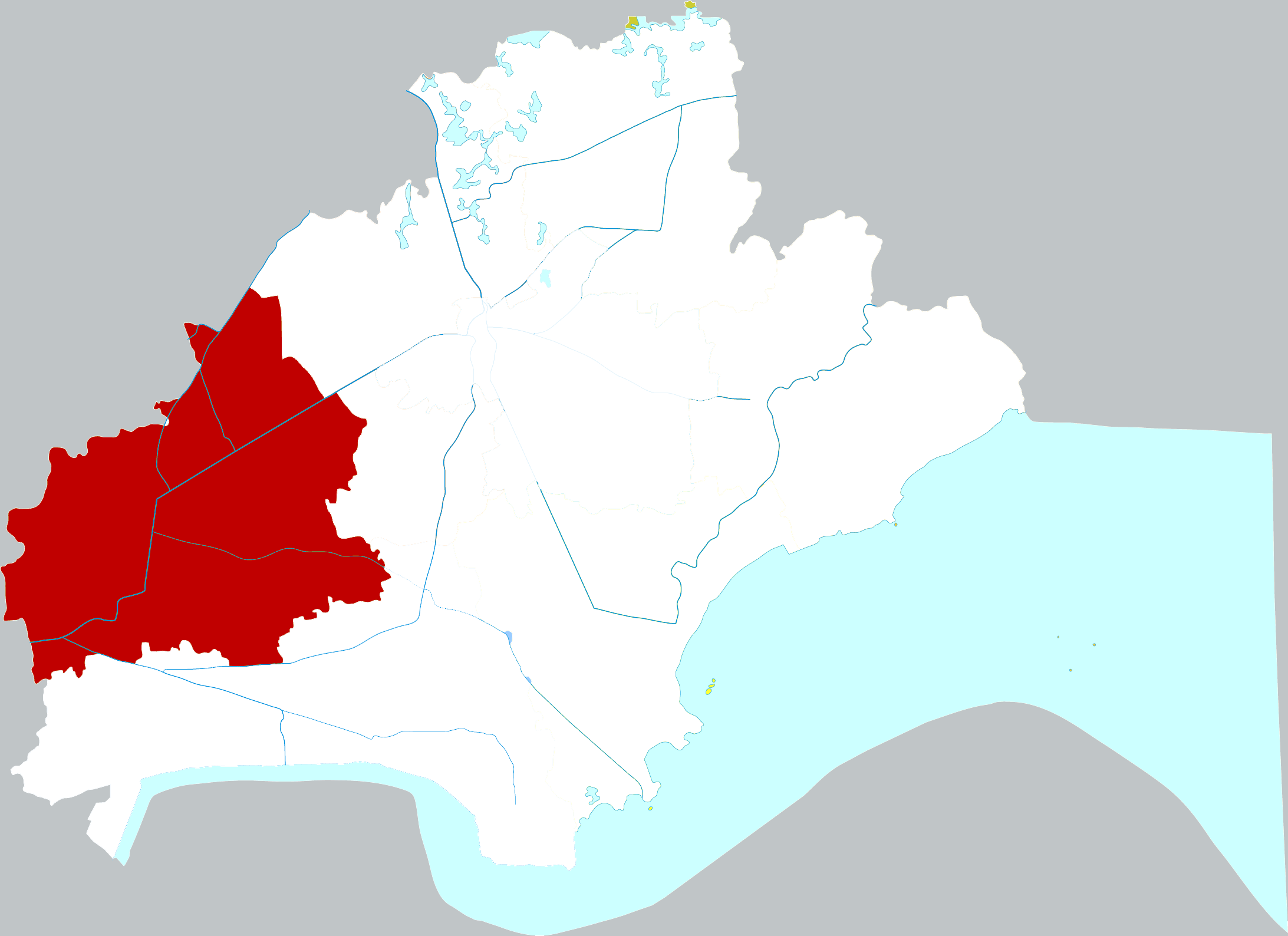
- Location of Tongxiang City within Jiaxing

- Location in Zhejiang
- Coordinates: 30°38′N 120°32′E
- Country: People's Republic of China
- Province: Zhejiang
- Prefecture-level city: Jiaxing

Area
  - County-level city: 727.49 km^{2} (280.89 sq mi)
  - Urban: 727.49 km^{2} (280.89 sq mi)
  - Metro: 727.49 km^{2} (280.89 sq mi)

Population (2020 census)
  - County-level city: 1,029,754
  - Density: 1,415.5/km^{2} (3,666.1/sq mi)
  - Urban: 1,029,754
  - Urban density: 1,415.5/km^{2} (3,666.1/sq mi)
  - Metro: 1,029,754
  - Metro density: 1,415.5/km^{2} (3,666.1/sq mi)
- Time zone: UTC+8 (China Standard)

Tongxiang City (Chinese: 桐乡; pinyin: Tóngxiāng; Wu: Ton-shion) is a county-level city, part of Jiaxing, in northern Zhejiang Province, China, bordering Jiangsu province to the north. It had a population of 1,029,754 as of the 2020 census even though its built-up (or metro) area is smaller. Nevertheless, as the city is expanding east quickly, its now nearly conurbated with Jiaxing built-up (or metro) area by Xiuzhou District.

Tongxiang was the birthplace of 20th-century novelist and cultural critic Mao Dun. The scenic town of Wuzhen is part of Tongxiang.

== Administration ==
Tongxiang administers three subdistricts and eight towns.

- Wutong Subdistrict (梧桐街道), seat of the administration
- Fengming Subdistrict (凤鸣街道)
- Gaoqiao Subdistrict (高桥街道)
- Puyuan Town (濮院镇)
- Tudian Town (屠甸镇)
- Heshan Town (河山镇)
- Wuzhen Town (乌镇镇)
- Shimen Town (石门镇)
- Dama Town (大麻镇)
- Chongfu Town (崇福镇)
- Zhouquan Town (洲泉镇)

== Climate ==
Climate data for Tongxiang, elevation 6 m (20 ft), (1991–2020 normals, extremes 1981–present)
Month	Jan	Feb	Mar	Apr	May	Jun	Jul	Aug	Sep	Oct	Nov	Dec	Year
Record high °C (°F)	23.1 (73.6)	28.3 (82.9)	33.6 (92.5)	33.7 (92.7)	36.6 (97.9)	38.0 (100.4)	41.0 (105.8)	39.7 (103.5)	38.7 (101.7)	34.7 (94.5)	29.8 (85.6)	23.9 (75.0)	41.0 (105.8)
Mean daily maximum °C (°F)	8.2 (46.8)	10.6 (51.1)	15.2 (59.4)	21.3 (70.3)	26.1 (79.0)	28.8 (83.8)	33.3 (91.9)	32.6 (90.7)	28.3 (82.9)	23.3 (73.9)	17.4 (63.3)	11.1 (52.0)	21.4 (70.4)
Daily mean °C (°F)	4.5 (40.1)	6.6 (43.9)	10.6 (51.1)	16.4 (61.5)	21.5 (70.7)	24.8 (76.6)	29.1 (84.4)	28.6 (83.5)	24.4 (75.9)	19.0 (66.2)	13.0 (55.4)	6.8 (44.2)	17.1 (62.8)
Mean daily minimum °C (°F)	1.5 (34.7)	3.3 (37.9)	7.1 (44.8)	12.4 (54.3)	17.7 (63.9)	21.8 (71.2)	25.7 (78.3)	25.6 (78.1)	21.2 (70.2)	15.3 (59.5)	9.3 (48.7)	3.4 (38.1)	13.7 (56.6)
Record low °C (°F)	−7.2 (19.0)	−6.6 (20.1)	−2.6 (27.3)	1.7 (35.1)	8.4 (47.1)	13.1 (55.6)	17.9 (64.2)	18.2 (64.8)	11.7 (53.1)	2.5 (36.5)	−3.1 (26.4)	−9.5 (14.9)	−9.5 (14.9)
Average precipitation mm (inches)	86.1 (3.39)	79.4 (3.13)	116.7 (4.59)	96.5 (3.80)	112.3 (4.42)	229.0 (9.02)	146.9 (5.78)	173.6 (6.83)	105.3 (4.15)	66.9 (2.63)	66.0 (2.60)	57.3 (2.26)	1,336 (52.6)
Average precipitation days (≥ 0.1 mm)	12.3	11.4	14.0	13.0	12.3	14.9	12.4	13.7	10.8	8.0	9.9	9.0	141.7
Average snowy days	3.6	2.3	0.9	0.1	0	0	0	0	0	0	0.2	1.2	8.3
Average relative humidity (%)	78	76	75	73	74	80	77	78	79	76	78	76	77
Mean monthly sunshine hours	104.5	106.4	130.4	151.4	160.8	120.8	198.0	193.9	148.5	147.0	121.7	119.3	1,702.7
Percentage possible sunshine	32	34	35	39	38	29	46	48	40	42	39	38	38
Source: China Meteorological Administrationall-time extreme temperature

== Economy ==
Hángbáijú (杭白菊), a variety of chrysanthemum flower tea, originates from Tongxiang. There are also annual Chrysanthemum festivals.

Tongxiang is one of biggest woolen sweater manufacturing base. In 2006, Tongxiang sold over 600 million woolen sweaters.

Puyuan Town (濮院镇) hosted the GQ Men of the Year awards in 2023; Brunello Cucinelli was honored as "Designer of the Year".

== Education ==
Tongxiang is home to a joint-venture Canadian high school program called Jiaxing Grand Canadian Academy at Maodun Senior High School. The school offers the British Columbia, Canada high school graduation program that culminates in the awarding of the Dogwood Diploma. The school enrolls local Chinese students and employs only foreign, B.C. certified teachers to teach all subjects in English (Canadian history, math, science, English, PE, etc.). The school is on a sprawling campus with modern features (gym, running track, science labs, etc.). The school opened in 2005 and has been inspected and re-certified by the BC Government (MOE) each year since.

== Notable people ==
- Mao Dun (1896–1981), essayist, journalist, novelist and playwright.
- Kun-Liang Guan (born 1963), biochemist, born in Tongxiang
- Feng Zikai (1898–1975), prolific artist, writer, and intellectual who made strides in the fields of music, art, literature, philosophy, and translation.

== Transport ==
Tongxiang is served by Tongxiang Railway Station, which connects it to Shanghai, Hangzhou, and other cities with a number of high speed trains.

== Twin towns ==
Tongxiang is twinned with:

- Bandırma, Turkey since 2002
