= Shanghai–Hangzhou high-speed railway =

350 km/h-max train route in eastern China

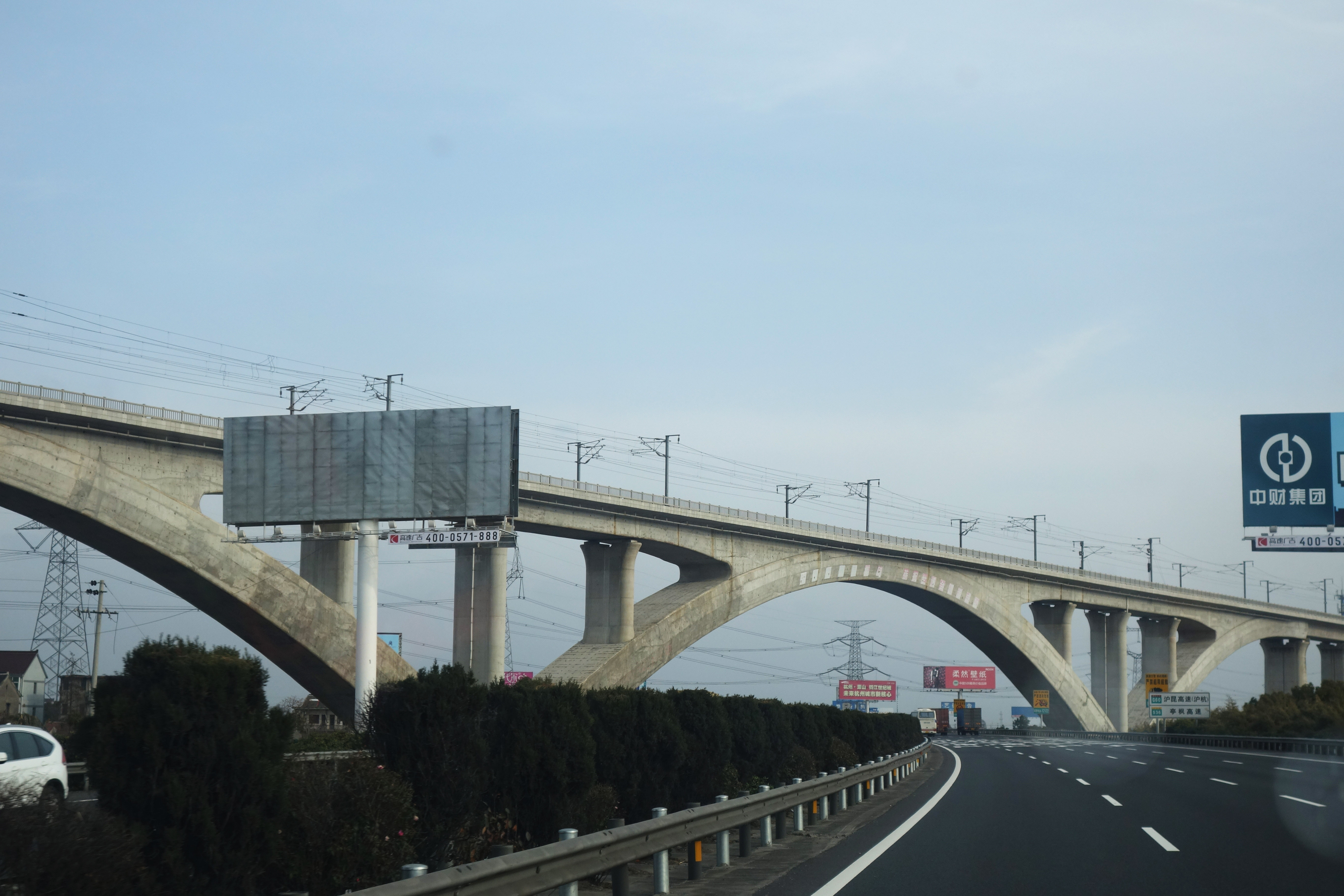
- Viaduct carrying the Shanghai–Hangzhou high-speed railway

Overview
- Native name: 沪杭客运专线 沪杭高速铁路 沪昆高速铁路上海至杭州段
- Status: Operational
- Owner: CR Shanghai
- Locale: Shanghai; Zhejiang province: Jiaxing, Hangzhou
- Termini: Shanghai Hongqiao Shanghai South (from 2025); Hangzhou East Hangzhou

Service
- Type: High-speed rail
- System: China Railway High-speed
- Operator: CR Shanghai
- Rolling stock: CRH1A, CRH1B, CRH1E; CRH2A, CRH2B, CRH2C, CRH2E; CRH3C; CRH380A, CRH380AL; CRH380B, CRH380BL, CRH380CL; CRH380D; CR400BF, CR400BF-A, CR400BF-B
- Daily ridership: 82,000 per day (2011)

History
- Opened: October 26, 2010; 15 years ago

Technical
- Line length: 169 km (105 mi)
- Track gauge: 1,435 mm (4 ft 8 1/2 in) standard gauge
- Electrification: 25 kV 50 Hz AC (Overhead line)
- Operating speed: 350 km/h (220 mph)
- Signalling: CTCS Level 3
- Maximum incline: 2%
Route map

Shanghai–Hangzhou high-speed railway
- Simplified Chinese: 沪杭客运专线 or 沪杭高速铁路
- Traditional Chinese: 滬杭客運專線 or 滬杭高速鐵路
Transcriptions
Standard Mandarin
- Hanyu Pinyin: Hùháng Kèyùn Zhuānxiàn or Hùháng Gāosù Tiělù
Wu
- Romanization: ghu^{上}ghaon^{平} khah^{入}yiuin^{去} tsoe^{平}sie^{去} or ghu^{上}ghaon^{平} kau^{平}soh^{入} thih^{入}lu^{去}

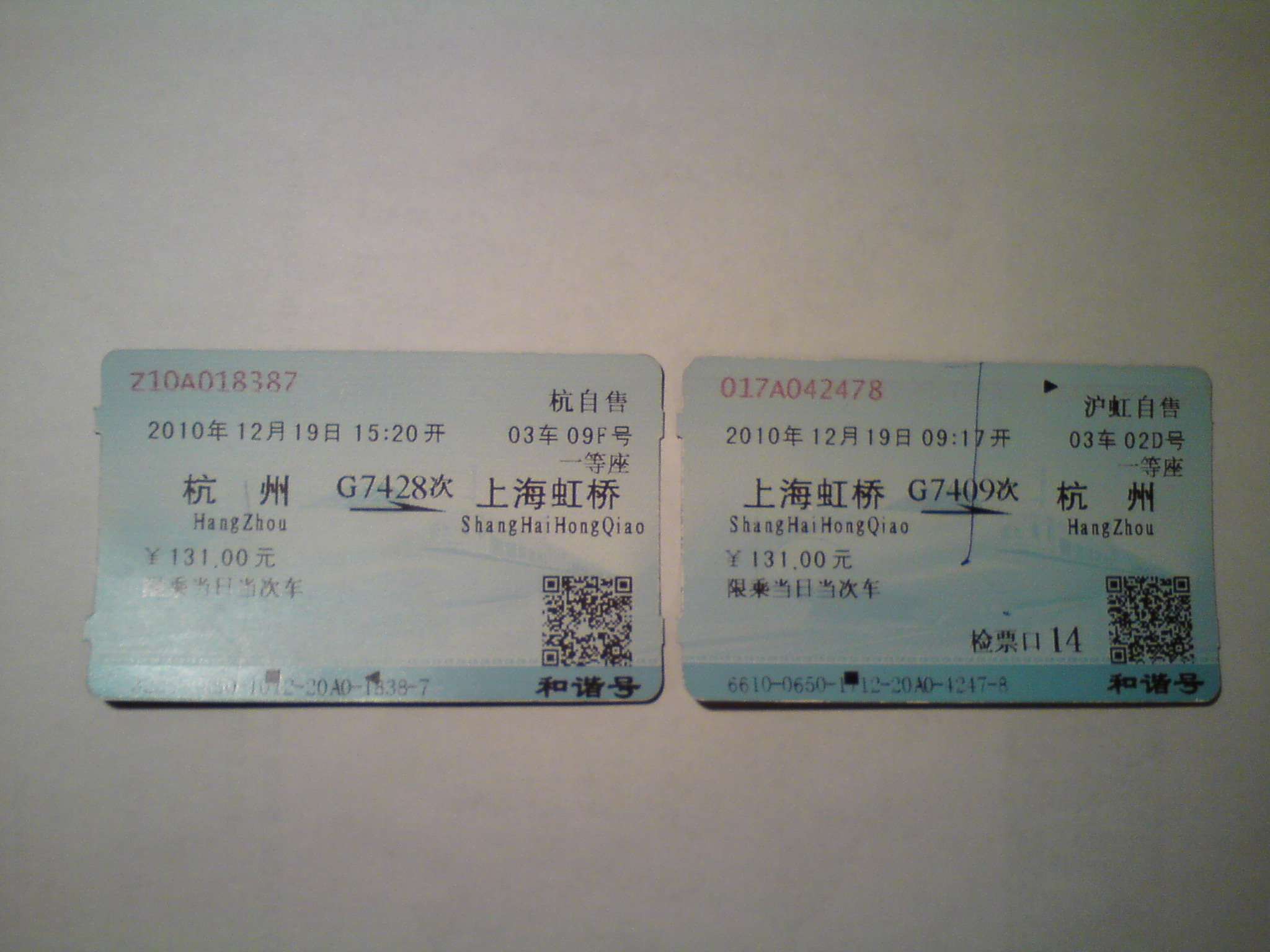
Tickets for the Shanghai-Hangzhou high-speed railway

The Shanghai–Hangzhou high-speed railway (Chinese: 沪杭客运专线 or 沪杭高速铁路), also known as the Huhang high-speed railway or Huhang passenger railway, is a high-speed rail line in China between Shanghai and Hangzhou, Zhejiang. The line is 202 km (126 mi) in length and designed for commercial train service at 350 km/h (215 mph). It was built in 20 months and opened on October 26, 2010. The line shortened travel time between the two cities from 78 to 45 minutes. The line is also used by trains departing Shanghai's terminals for Nanchang, Changsha, Guiyang, and Kunming, making it part of the Shanghai–Kunming High-Speed Railway. It has made the proposed Shanghai–Hangzhou Maglev Line unlikely. It serves as a faster alternative to the original Shanghai–Hangzhou Railway, built in 1909.

== Speed records ==
In September 2010, a test train on the Shanghai-Hangzhou high-speed line achieved a speed of 416.6 km/h (258.9 mph), setting a Chinese train speed record.

In October 2010, Chinese officials stated that a bullet train on the Huhang high-speed railway had set a new world record for train speed on a scheduled trip at 262 mph (422 km/h).

== Etymology ==
"Hù" (沪) is the official abbreviation for Shanghai and "Háng" (杭) stands for Hangzhou, the capital city of Zhejiang Province.

== Station list ==
There are nine railway stations on the line:

- Shanghai Hongqiao railway station
- Shanghai Songjiang railway station
- Jinshan North railway station
- Jiashan South railway station
- Jiaxing South railway station
- Tongxiang railway station
- Haining West railway station
- Linping South railway station
- Hangzhou East railway station
- Hangzhou railway station

On July 1, 2013, the new Hangzhou East station was opened which serves the Shanghai–Hangzhou Passenger Railway, as well as the Hangzhou–Ningbo high-speed railway, the Nanjing–Hangzhou Passenger Railway, and the Hangzhou–Changsha high-speed railway.

From 2025, a branch line to Shanghai South will open to relieve overcrowding at Hongqiao station.

| Station | Chinese | Distance (km) | Prefecture-level city | Province / Municipality | Metro transfers |
|---|---|---|---|---|---|
| Shanghai Hongqiao | 上海虹桥 | 0.00 | Shanghai | Shanghai | 2 10 17 |
| Shanghai Songjiang | 上海松江 | 31.00 | Shanghai | Shanghai | 9 |
| Jinshan North | 金山北 | 48.00 | Shanghai | Shanghai | |
| Jiashan South | 嘉善南 | 67.00 | Jiaxing | Zhejiang | |
| Jiaxing South | 嘉兴南 | 84.00 | Jiaxing | Zhejiang | Jiaxing Tram Line 1 |
| Tongxiang | 桐乡 | 112.00 | Jiaxing | Zhejiang | |
| Haining West | 海宁西 | 133.00 | Jiaxing | Zhejiang | Hanghai |
| Linping South | 临平南 | 144.00 | Hangzhou | Zhejiang | 9 Hanghai |
| Hangzhou East | 杭州东 | 159.00 | Hangzhou | Zhejiang | 1 4 6 19 |
| Hangzhou | 杭州 | 169.00 | Hangzhou | Zhejiang | 1 5 |
