= Nanyuan station =

Nanyuan station may refer to:

- Nanyuan station (Hangzhou Metro), a station on Line 9 of the Hangzhou Metro.
- Nanyuan station (Ningbo Rail Transit), a station on Line 8 of the Ningbo Rail Transit.
