= Nanhu, Jiaxing =

Nanhu 南湖区
- District
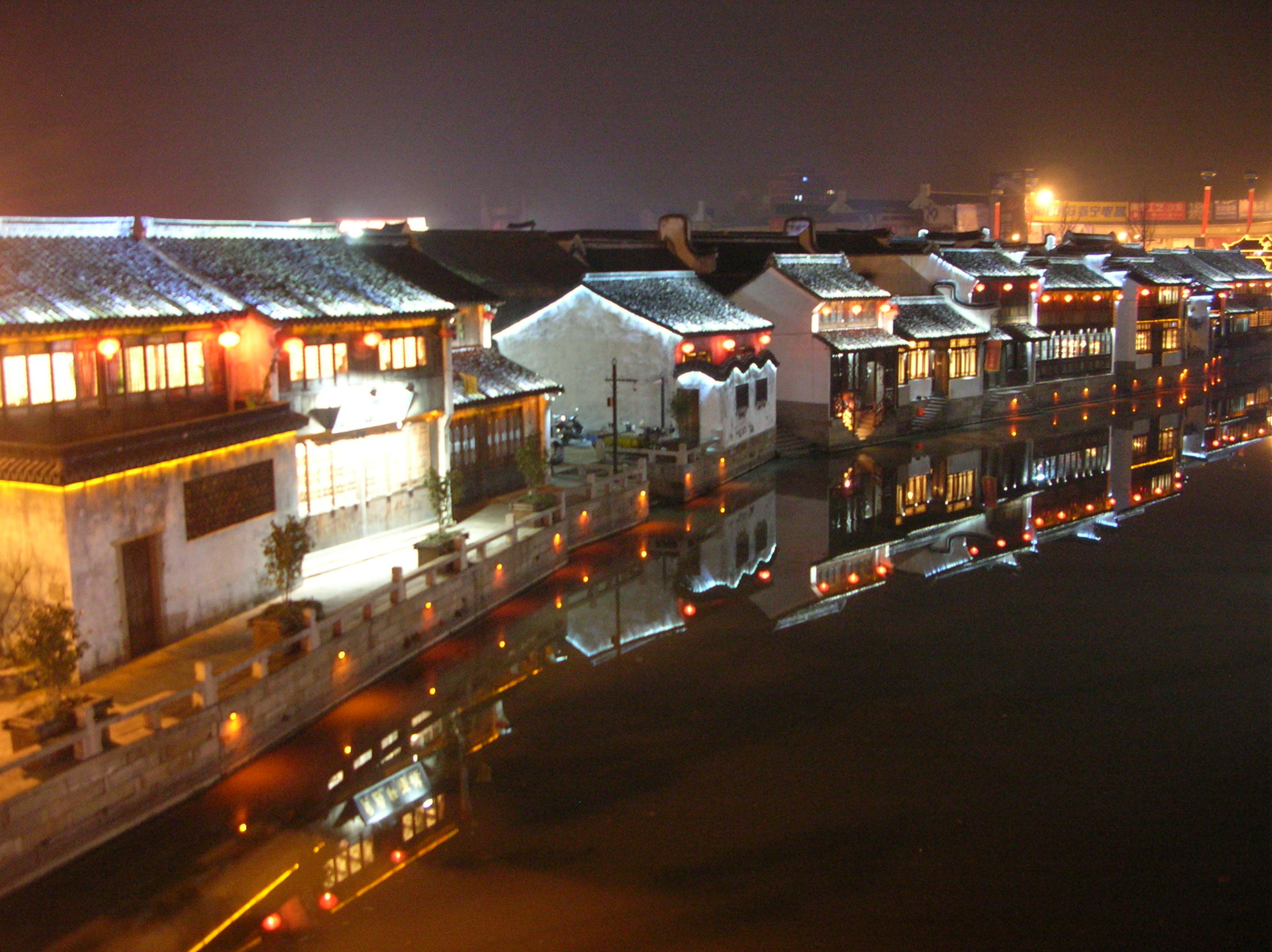

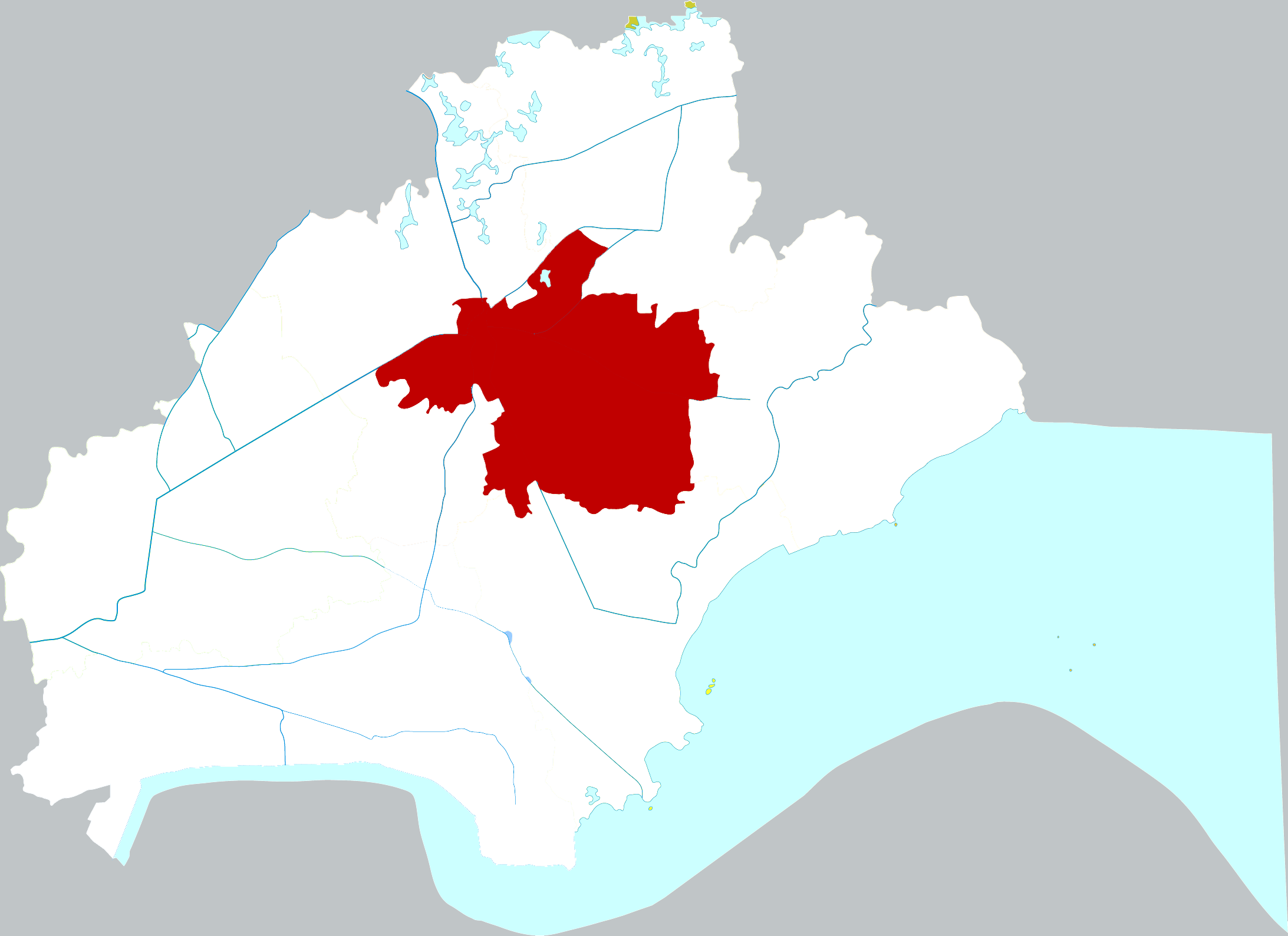
- Location of Nanhu District within Jiaxing

- Location in Zhejiang
- Coordinates: 30°45′N 120°46′E
- Country: People's Republic of China
- Province: Zhejiang
- Prefecture-level city: Jiaxing

Area
  - Total: 438.99 km^{2} (169.49 sq mi)

Population (2020)
  - Total: 839,433
  - Density: 1,912.2/km^{2} (4,952.6/sq mi)
- Time zone: UTC+8 (China Standard)

Nanhu District (Chinese: 南湖区; pinyin: Nánhú Qū) is a district in Jiaxing, Zhejiang Province of China. Its former name was Xiucheng District (秀城区), and it changed to its current name on 17 May 2005. Total area is 425.83 km^{2} (164.41 sq mi), and total population is 450,000 in 2001. At the end of 2013, the number of households registered in Nanhu District

== Population ==
According to the administrative divisions was 168,982, with a population of 48,905, an increase of 1.2% over the previous year. Among them, the non-agricultural population was 340,708, an increase of 1.7% over the previous year. The annual birth rate is 8.64%, the mortality rate is 6.45%, the natural population growth rate is 2.19%, and the family planning rate is 98.81%.

== Transportation ==
Nanhu District is surrounded by Shanghai Hongqiao International Airport, Shanghai Pudong International Airport, Hangzhou Xiaoshan International Airport and Ningbo Lishe International Airport. It is also close to the Port of Shanghai, Beilun Port and Zhangpu Port, as well as Shanghai–Changzhou Expressway and Ningbo. (Pu) Jia (Xing) Su (State) Expressway and three expressways connecting Shanghai to Ningbo's Hangzhou Bay Bridge.

The Shanghai–Hangzhou railway Double Line, China National Highway 320 and Beijing–Hangzhou Grand Canal run through the whole area of Nanhu District. Among them, there are more than 80 pairs of passenger and freight trains on the Shanghai-Hangzhou Railway, and more than 100,000 passengers are transported daily, and more than 50,000 tons of goods are sent. The Beijing-Hangzhou Grand Canal is perennial. It is a 500-ton ship and is connected to the Zhapu Port and the railway transit port by a river network.

== Administration ==
Nanhu District is divided into 13 township-level towns or subdistricts (街道), including five inner subdistricts, four outer subdistricts and four towns.

Inner subdistricts:

- Jianshe (建设)
- Jiefang (解放)
- Xinjia (新嘉)
- Xinxing (新兴)
- Nanhu (南湖)

Outer subdistricts:

- Chengnan (城南)
- Changshui (长水)
- Dongzha (东栅)
- Qixin (七星)

Towns:

- Yuxin (余新)
- Fengqiao (凤桥)
- Xinfeng (新丰)
- Daqiao (大桥)
