= Hangzhou railway station =

Railway station in Hangzhou, China

Hangzhou 杭州
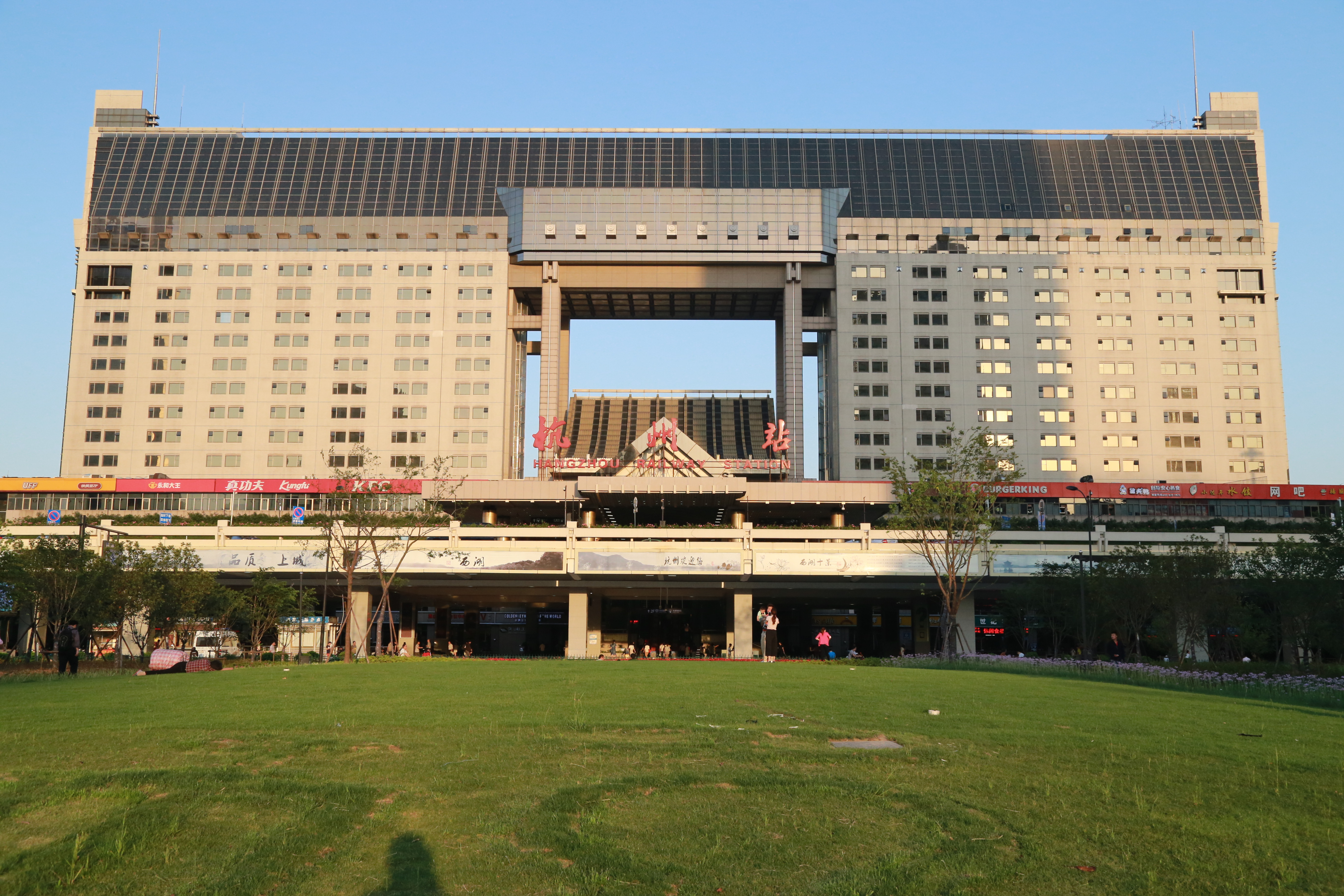
- Hangzhou railway station in May 2015

General information
- Other names: City Station (Chinese: 城站)
- Location: Huancheng Donglu, Shangcheng District, Hangzhou, Zhejiang; China
- Coordinates: 30°14′46″N 120°10′42″E
- Operated by: Shanghai Railway Bureau, China Railway Corporation
- Lines: Shanghai–Kunming Railway; Xuancheng–Hangzhou Railway; Shanghai–Hangzhou High-Speed Railway
- Platforms: 9

Construction
- Architect: Cheng Taining

Other information
- Station code: TMIS code: 32252; Telegraph code: HZH; Pinyin code: HZH
- Classification: 1st class station

History
- Opened: 1907; rebuilt 1942, 1999

Services
Preceding station	China Railway	Following station
Genshanmen towards Shanghai or Shanghai South	Shanghai–Kunming railway Hangzhou branch	Yingning towards Kunming
Preceding station	China Railway High-speed	Following station
Yuhang towards Shanghai South or Shanghai Hongqiao	Shanghai–Hangzhou high-speed railway Part of the Shanghai–Kunming High-Speed Railway	Terminus
Location

Hangzhou railway station (Chinese: 杭州火车站; pinyin: Hángzhōu Huǒchē Zhàn or Chinese: 城站; pinyin: Chéng zhàn; lit. 'station in city') is located in Shangcheng District, Hangzhou, Zhejiang Province of China. It is affiliated to Shanghai Railway Bureau, and is also the terminal of the Shanghai–Hangzhou Railway. The station is ranked first-class.

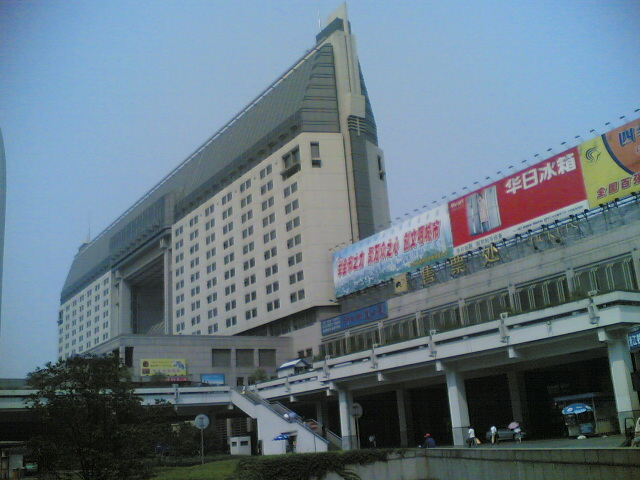
Hangzhou railway station

== History ==
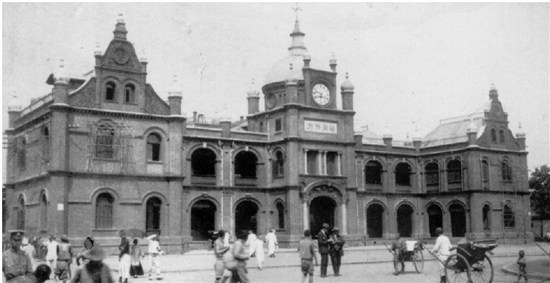
Hangzhou railway station in the early 20th century

The station was first built in 1906 as a stop along the Jiang-Shu railway (江墅铁路), and at that time was called "Qing Tai Men Station" (清泰门站). It was opened on 23 August 1907 as the railway was put into use. Because the station was hundreds of meters away from Hangzhou City at that time, the residents inside the city found it inconvenient. Thus, Ma Yifu (马一浮), a scholar returning from America, suggested the station move into the city. The building of the in-town station started in 1909 and was completed the following year. In 1937, the Sino-Japanese War began. The station was bombarded twice in October by the Japanese, and Hangzhou was occupied on 24 December. During the Japanese occupation in Hangzhou, the station was rebuilt from 26 March 1941 to 21 March 1942.

As the passenger load continuously grew, the station's capacity could hardly cope with the future demands. Thus the old station building was demolished in summer 1997, and a new one was erected and put into use on 28 December 1999.

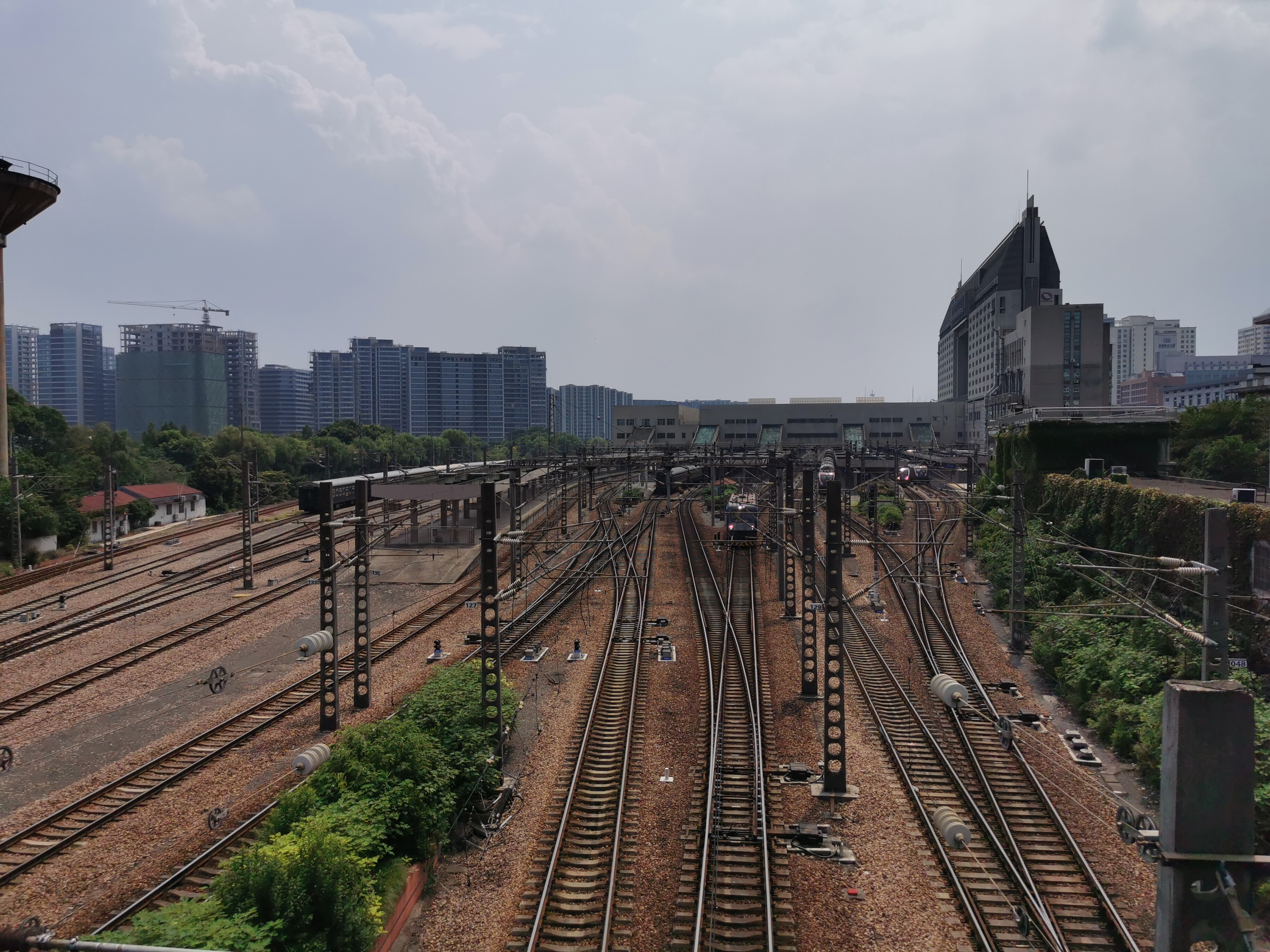
View of the tracks and platforms at Hangzhou railway station

== See also ==
- Hangzhou East railway station
- Hangzhou South railway station
- Hangzhou Metro
