= Yudao station =

Metro station in Hangzhou, China

Yudao 御道
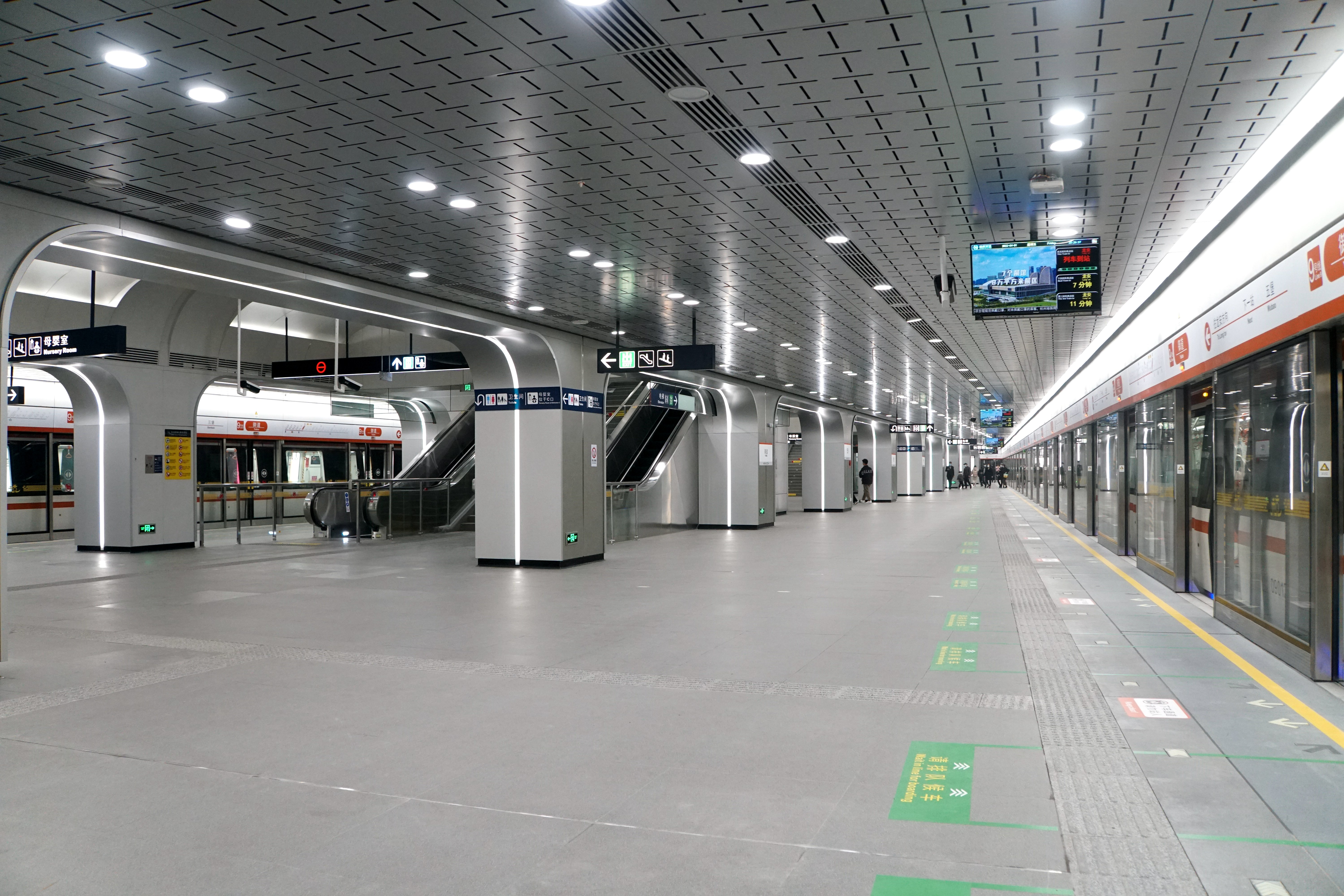
- Platform of Line 9 (before Line 19 opened)

General information
- Location: Qianjiang Road (钱江路); Shangcheng District, Hangzhou, Zhejiang; China
- Coordinates: 30°16′35″N 120°13′54″E
- Operated by: Hangzhou Metro Corporation
- Lines: Line 9 Line 19
- Platforms: 4 (1 island platform and 2 side platforms)

Construction
- Structure type: Underground (Line 9); Elevated (Line 19)
- Accessible: Yes

History
- Opened: Line 9: 1 April 2022; Line 19: 22 September 2022

Services
Preceding station	Hangzhou Metro	Following station
Sanbao towards Guanyintang	Line 9	Wubao towards Long'an
East Railway Station (East Square) towards Tiaoxi	Line 19	Pinglan Road towards Yongsheng Road
Location

Yudao (Chinese: 御道) is a metro station of Line 9 and Line 19 of the Hangzhou Metro in China. It is located in Shangcheng District of Hangzhou. The part of Line 9 was opened on 1 April 2022. The part of Line 19 was opened on 22 September 2022.

== Station layout ==
2F	Side platform, doors open on the right
2F		← Line 19 towards Tiaoxi (East Railway Station (East Square))
2F		Line 19 towards Yongsheng Road (Pinglan Road) →
2F	Side platform, doors open on the right
G	Line 19 concourse	Exits, Tickets, Customer Service Center
B1	Line 9 concourse	Tickets, Customer Service Center
B2		← Line 9 towards Guanyintang (Sanbao)
B2	Island platform, doors open on the left
B2		Line 9 towards Long'an (Wubao) →

=== Entrances/exits ===
- A: south side of Qianjiang Road
- B: opening soon
- C: north side of Qianjiang Road, Yudao Road (御道路)
- D: opening soon
- E: south side of Qianjiang Road
- F: opening soon

== Design ==
Yudao Station serves as the starting point of the "Lianbaofengcheng" (Chinese: 连堡丰城) project, positioned as an air-rail hub and a vital connection within the city. The station uses interconnected lighting to illustrate the operational pathways of the air-rail hub, showcasing a new urban ecosystem driven by the IoT.

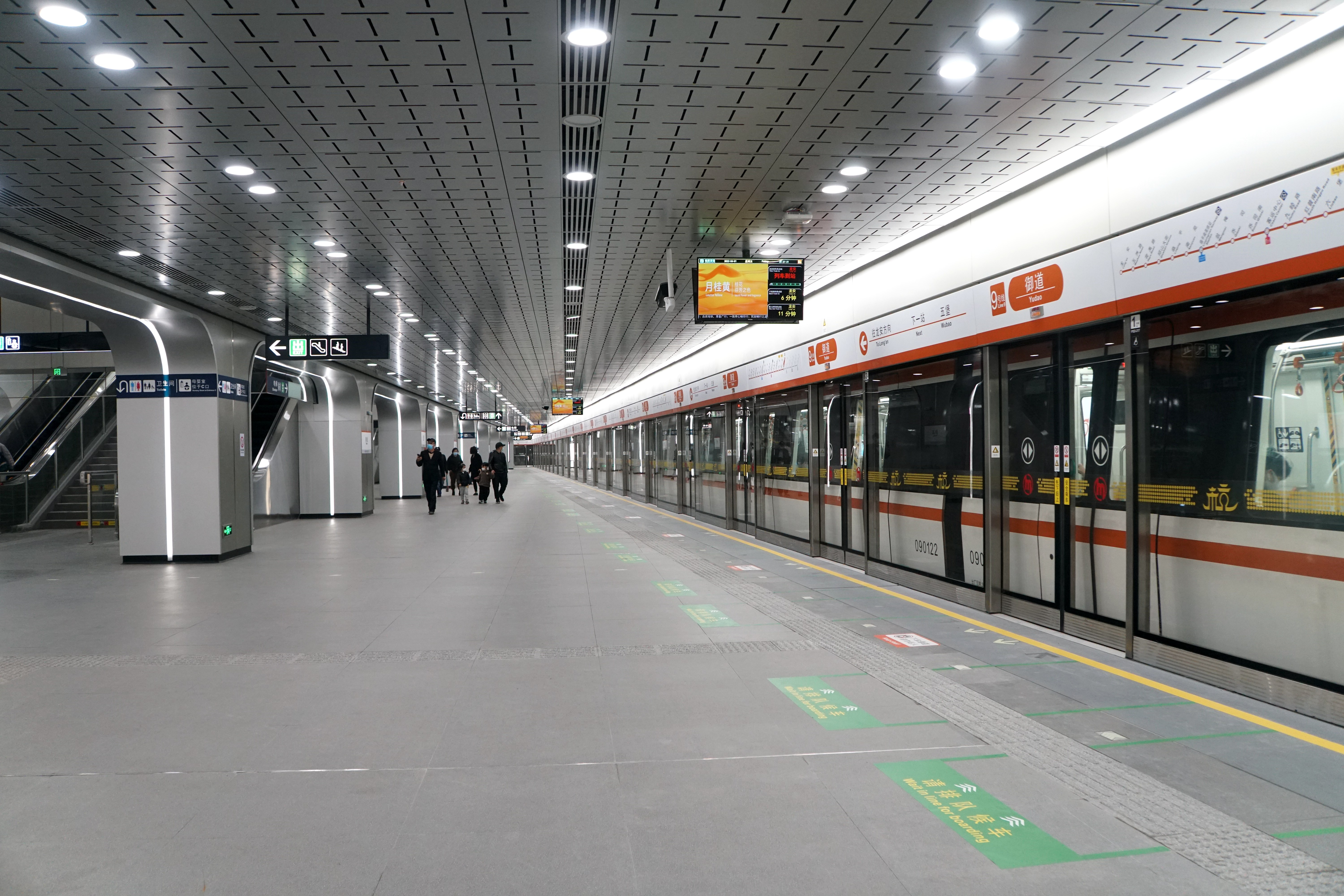
The platform of Line 9 is trapezoidal

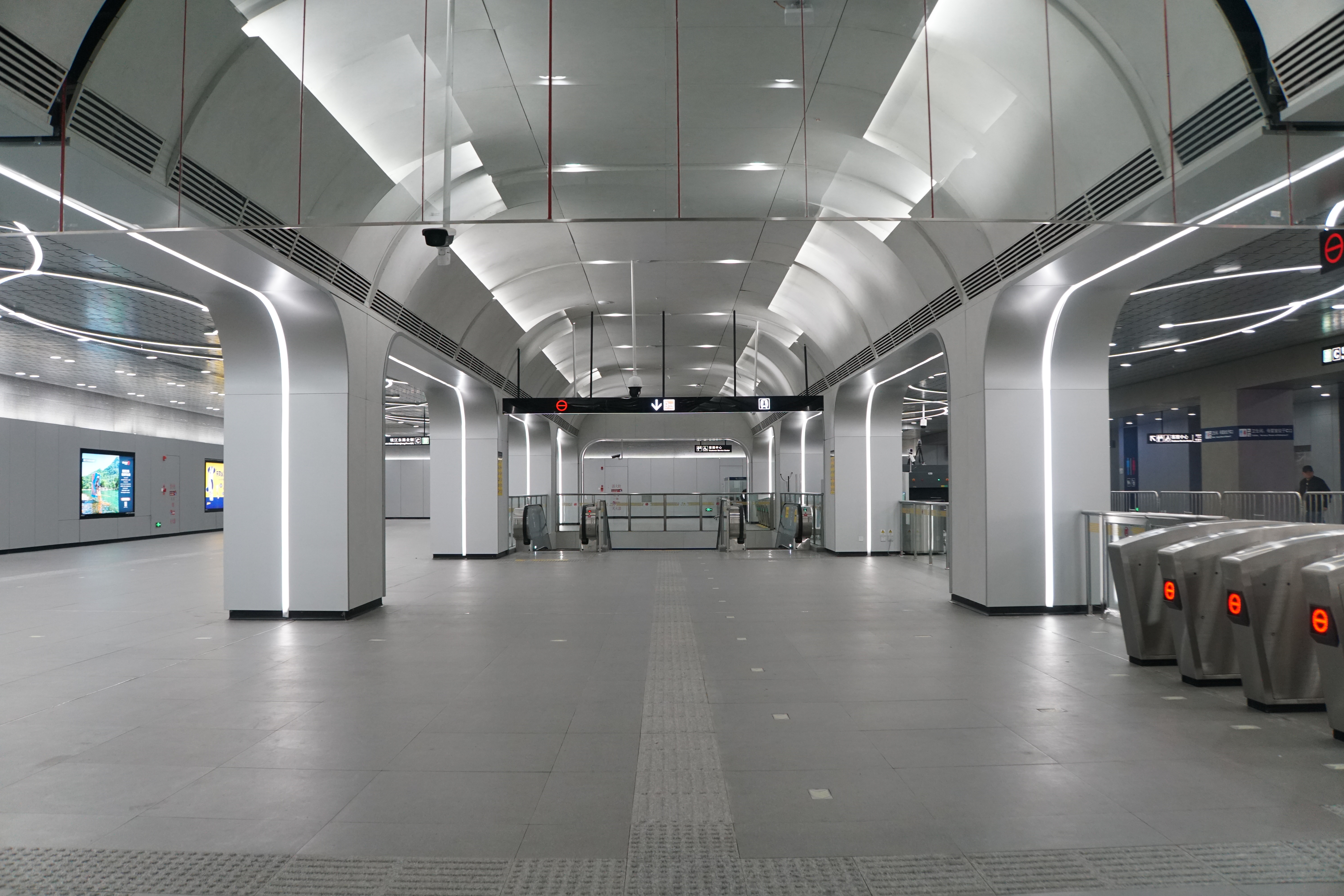
Concourse of Line 9

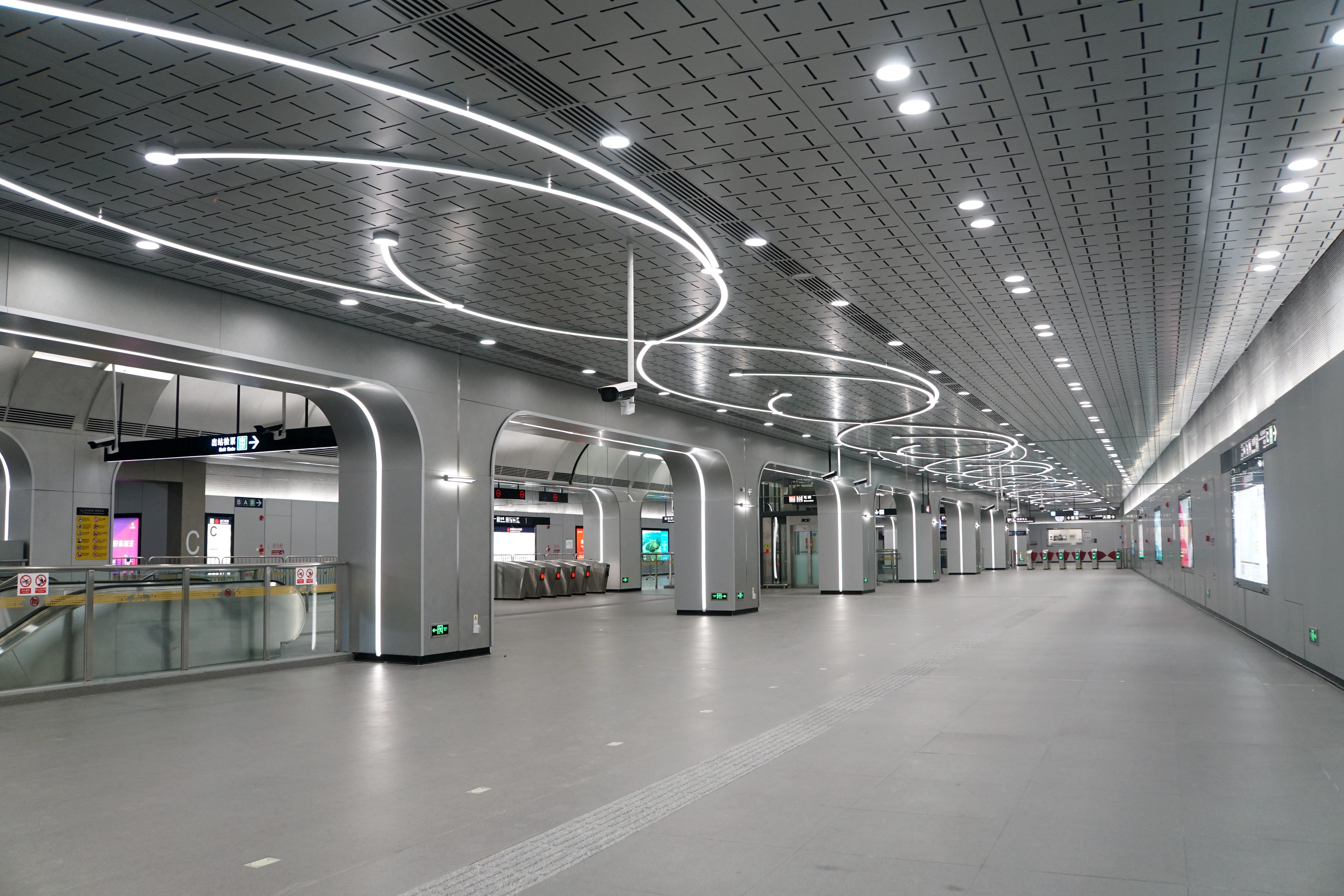
Concourse of Line 9

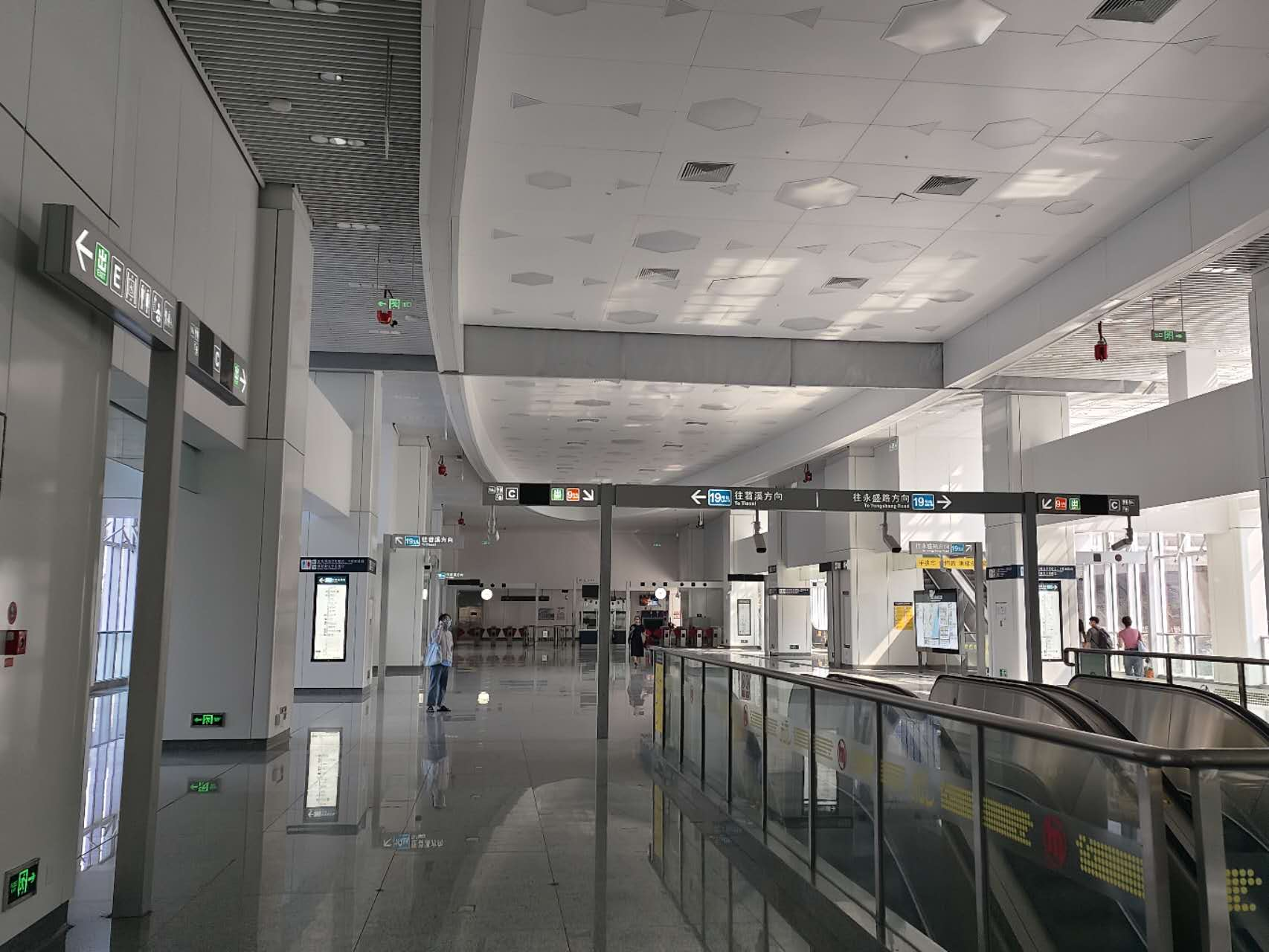
Concourse of Line 19

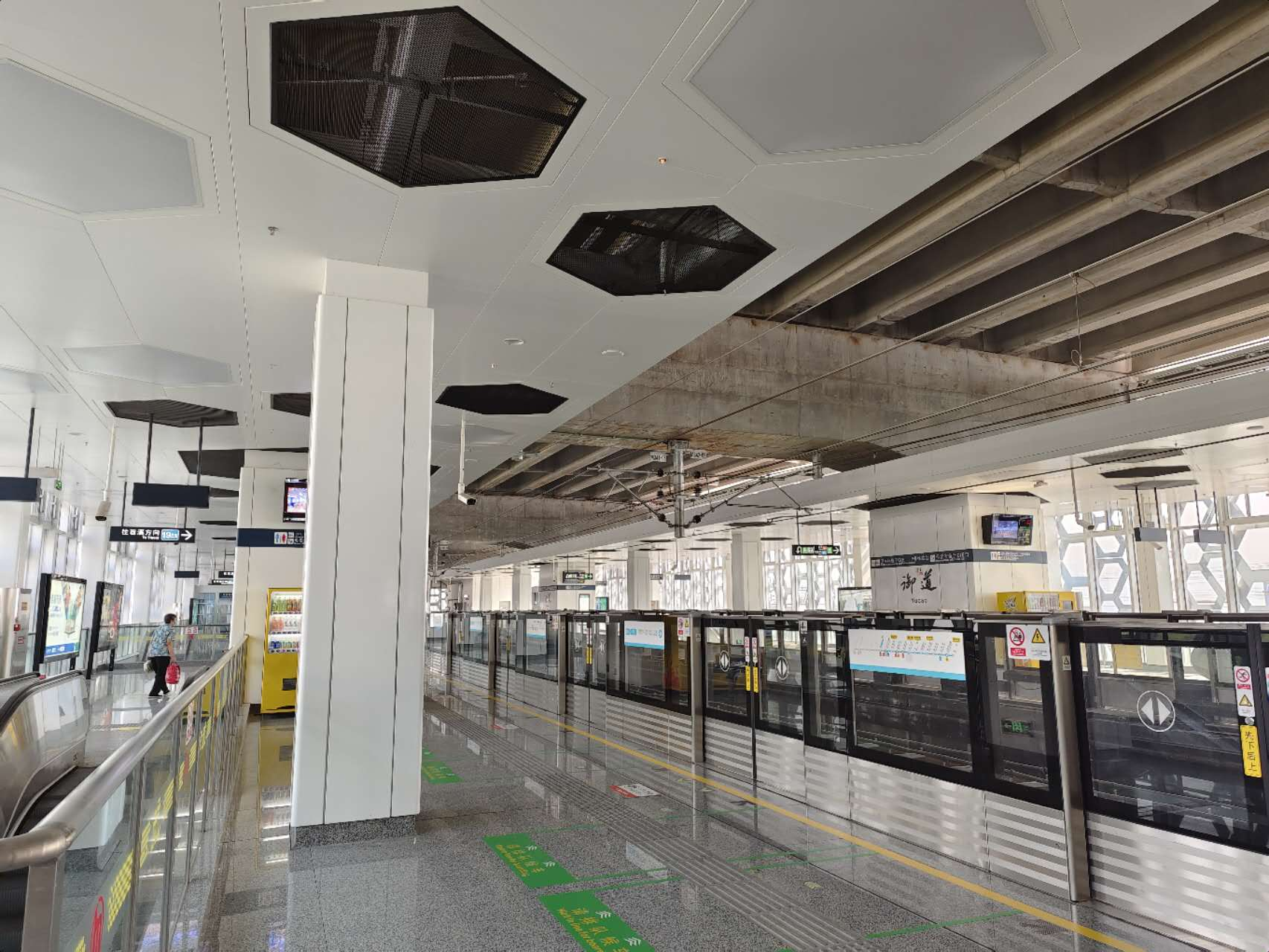
Platform of Line 19
