= South Hongpu Road station =

Metro station in Hangzhou, China

South Hongpu Road 红普南路
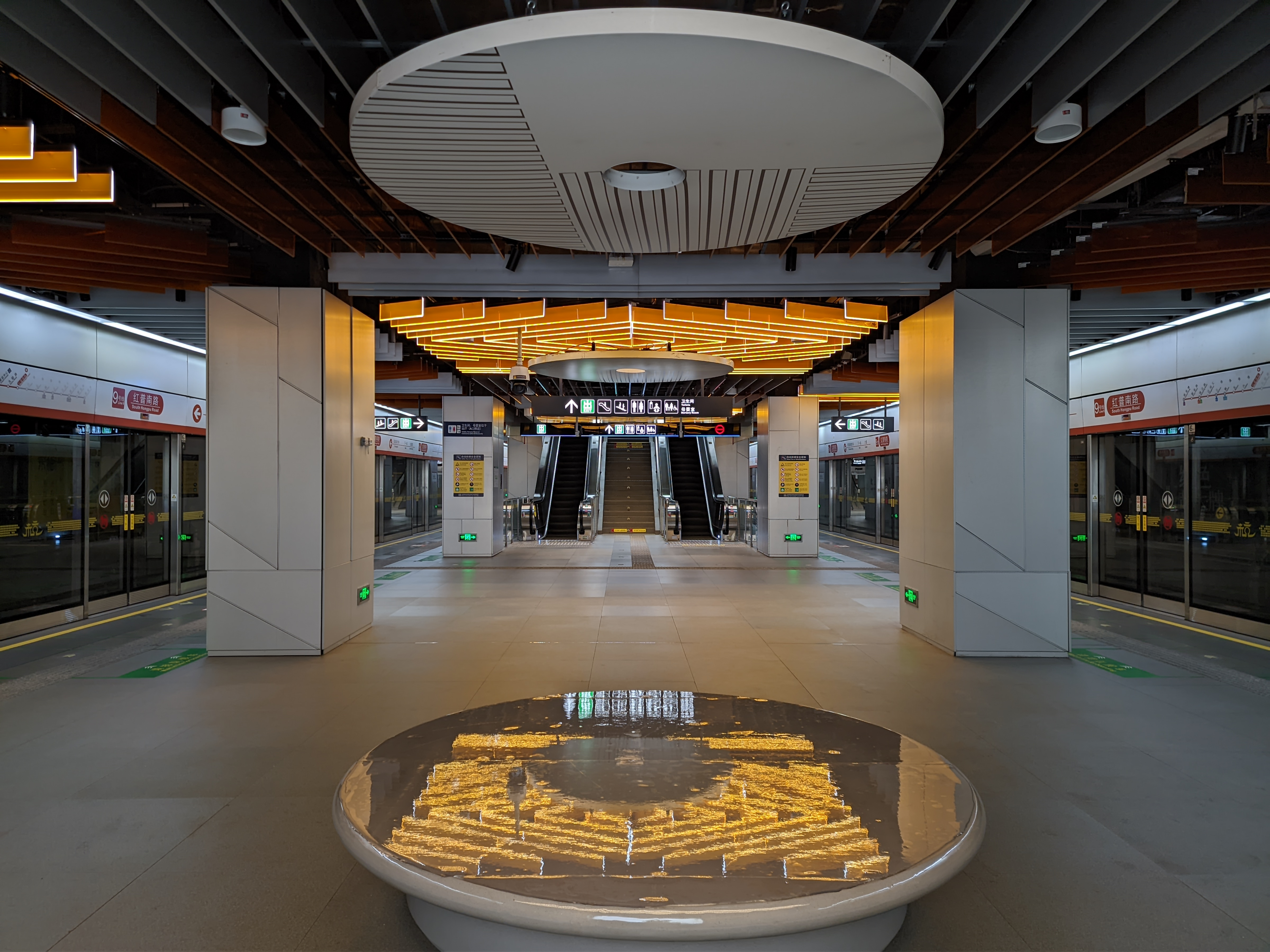
- Platforms

General information
- Location: Qianjiang Road × Hongpu Road; Shangcheng District, Hangzhou, Zhejiang; China
- Coordinates: 30°17′43″N 120°15′31″E
- System: Hangzhou metro station
- Operator: Hangzhou Metro Corporation
- Line: Line 9
- Platforms: 2 (1 island platform)

Construction
- Structure type: Underground
- Accessible: Yes

History
- Opened: 1 April 2022

Services
Preceding station	Hangzhou Metro	Following station
Liubao towards Guanyintang	Line 9	Jiumu Road towards Long'an
Location

South Hongpu Road (simplified Chinese: 红普南路; traditional Chinese: 紅普南路) is a metro station of Line 9 of the Hangzhou Metro in China. It is located in Shangcheng District of Hangzhou. The station was opened on 1 April 2022.

The station is actually located on the former site of Qibao old town (Chinese: 七堡老街), but the name "Qibao" was already taken by Qibao station on Line 1.

== Station layout ==
South Hongpu Road has two levels: a concourse, and an island platform with two tracks for line 9.

== Design ==
South Hongpu Road Station builds on the local atmosphere of the original Qibao old town, utilizing the metro, canal, and ancient seawall ruins to create a pedestrian leisure district. The varying forms of the arcade roof, made from acrylic and aluminum panels, complement the different functional spaces to be developed in the future.

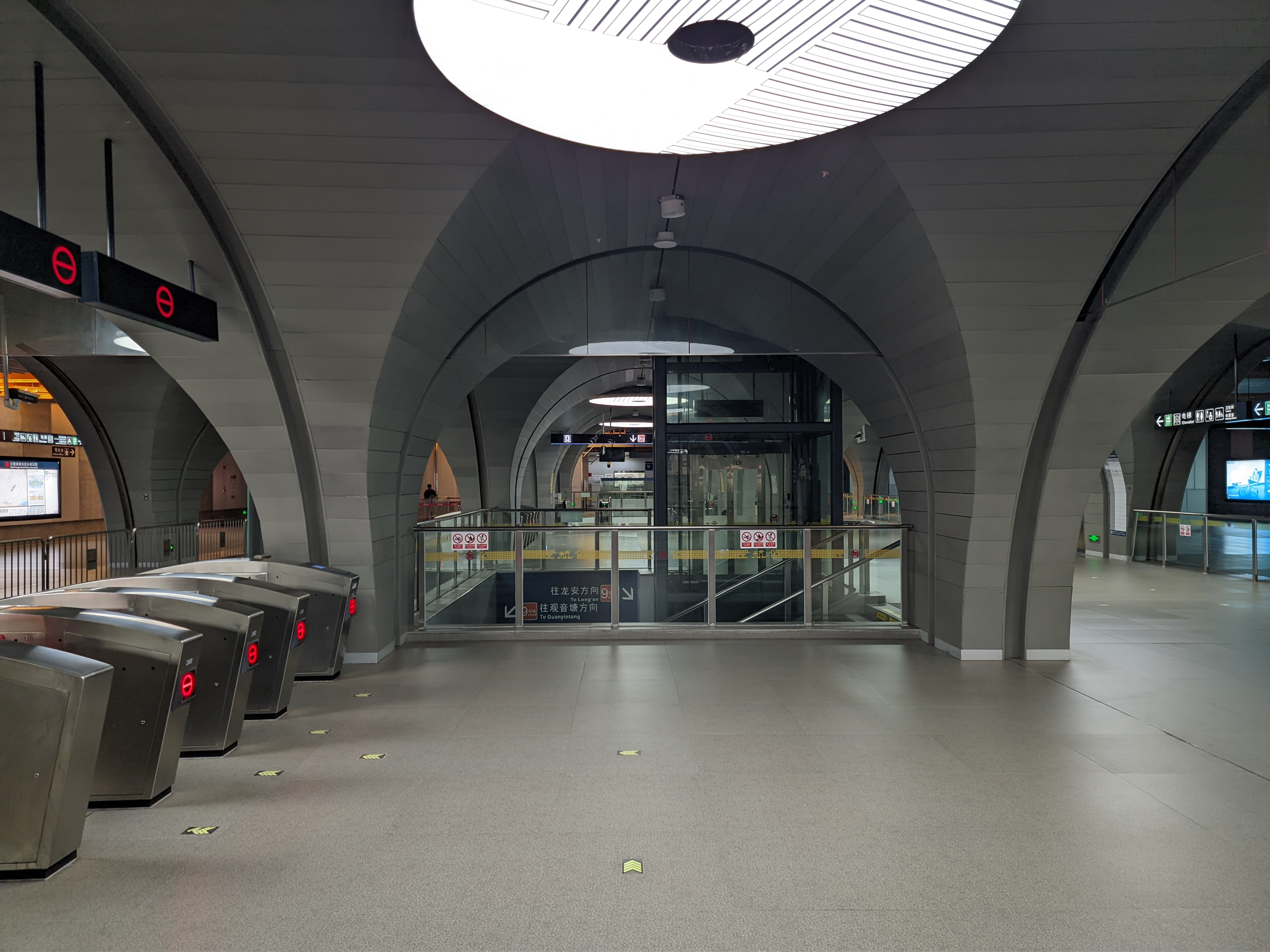
Concourse

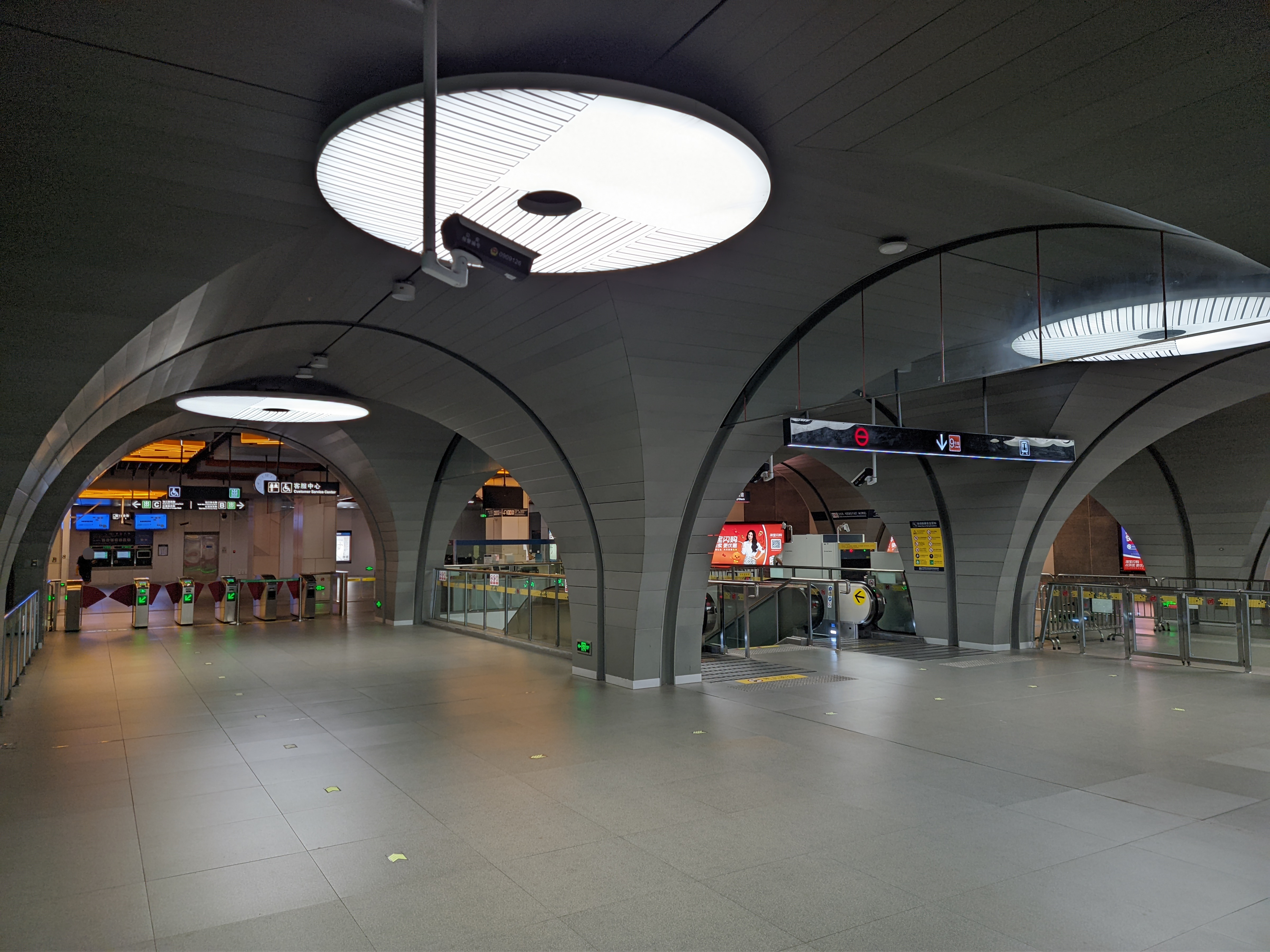
Concourse

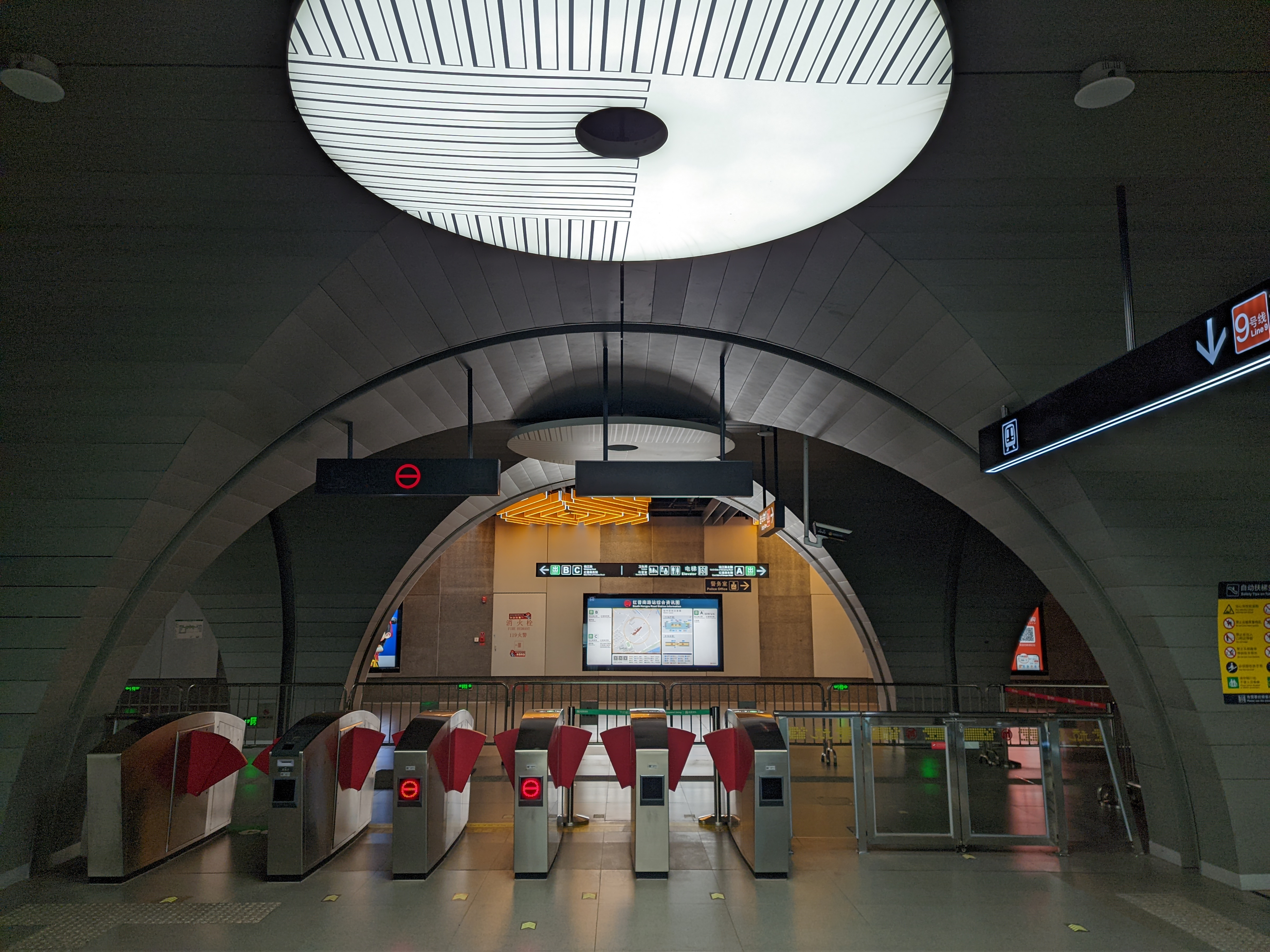
Ceiling decoration

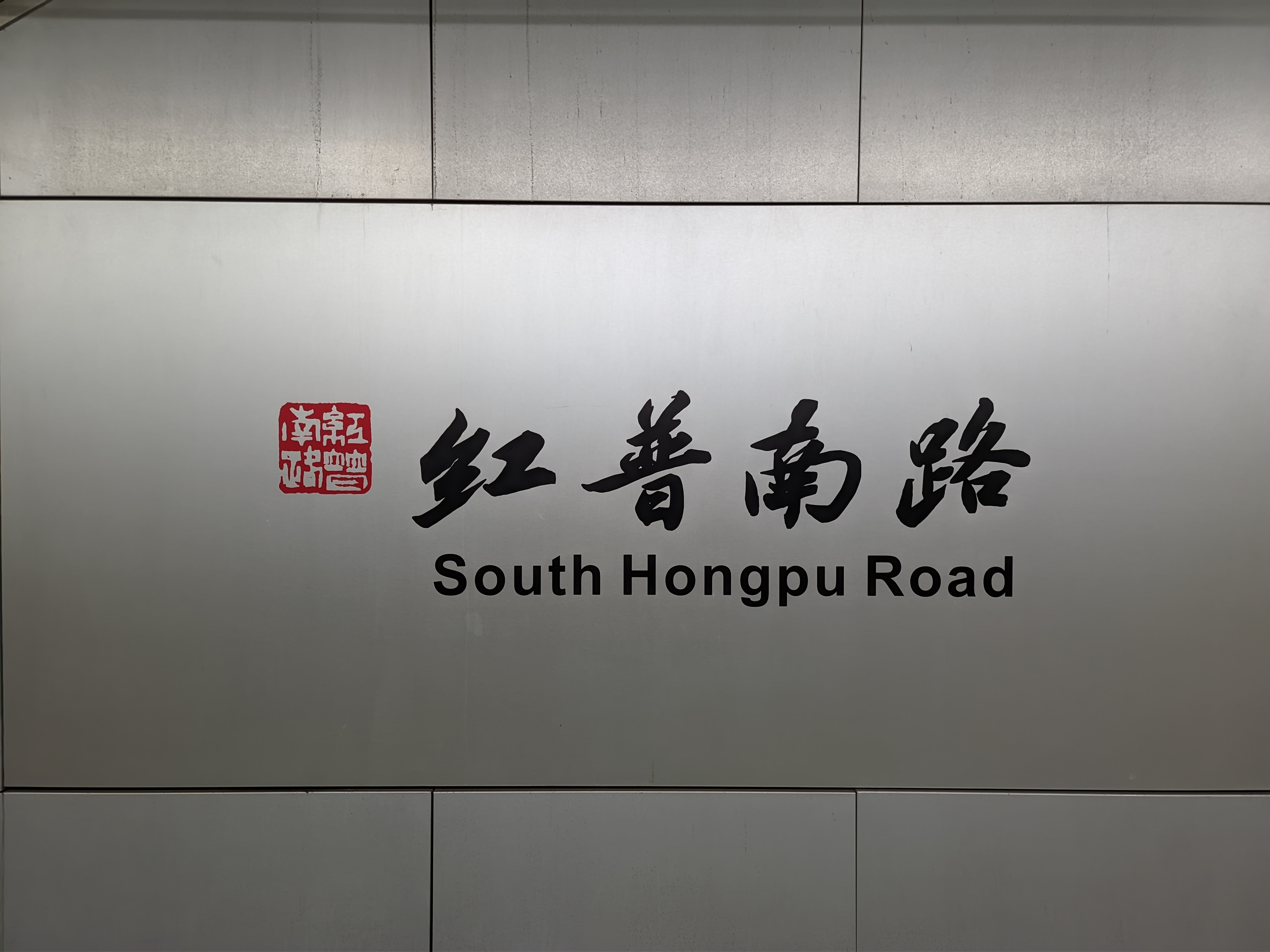
Station name in Chinese calligraphy

== Entrances/exits ==
- A: north side of Qianjiang Road, east side of Hongpu Road
- B: north side of Qianjiang Road, west side of Hongpu Road
- C: south side of Qianjiang Road, west side of Hongpu Road
