= South Qiaosi station =

Hangzhou Metro station

Coordinates: 30°19′47″N 120°17′11″E

South Qiaosi 乔司南
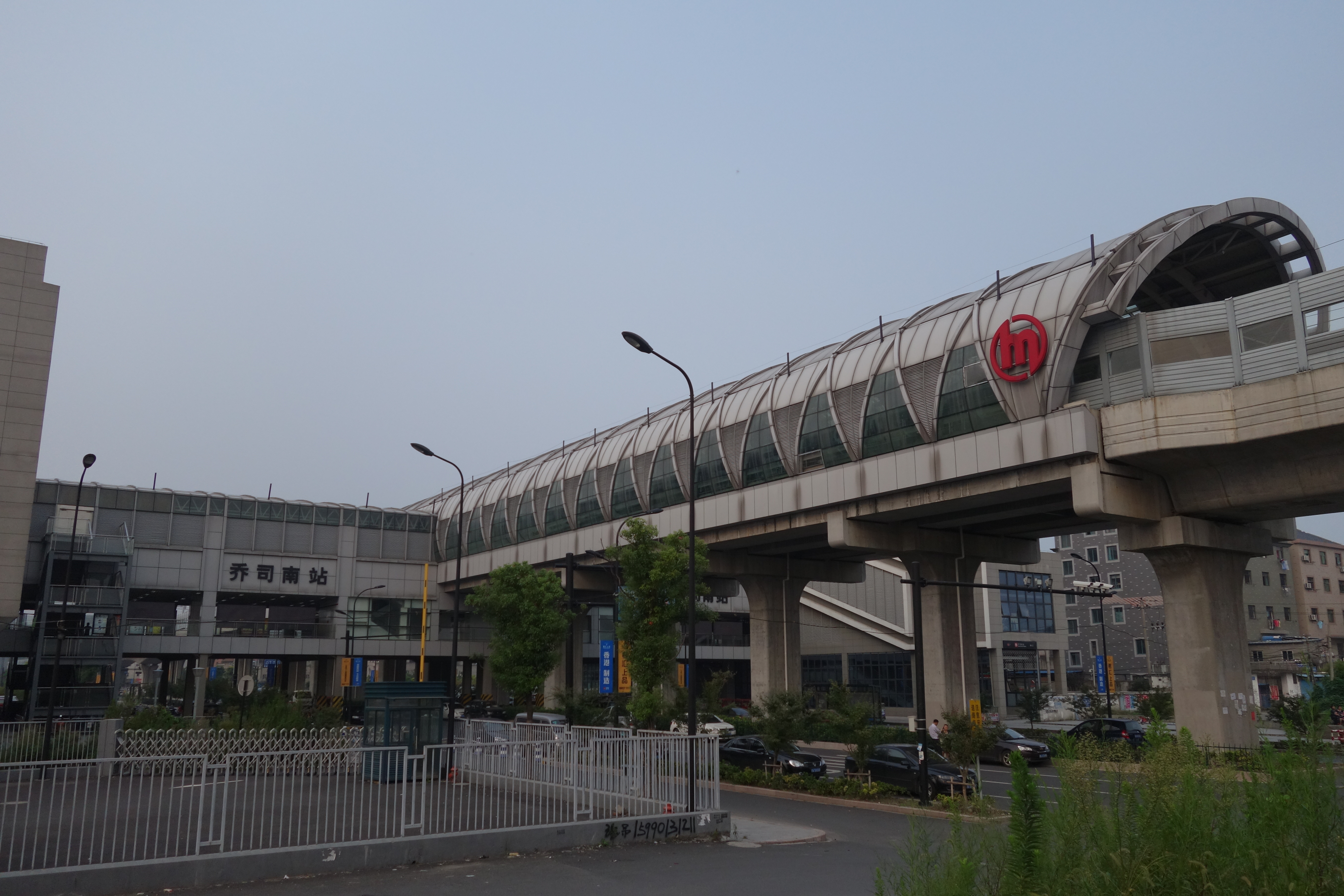

General information
- Location: Linping District, Hangzhou, Zhejiang; China
- Operated by: Hangzhou Metro Corporation
- Line: Line 9

Services
Preceding station	Hangzhou Metro	Following station
Coach Center towards Guanyintang	Line 9	Qiaosi towards Long'an
Location

South Qiaosi (Chinese: 乔司南) is a station on Line 9 of the Hangzhou Metro in China. It was opened in November 2012. It is located in the Linping District of Hangzhou.
