= Liubao station =

Metro station in Hangzhou, China

Liubao 六堡
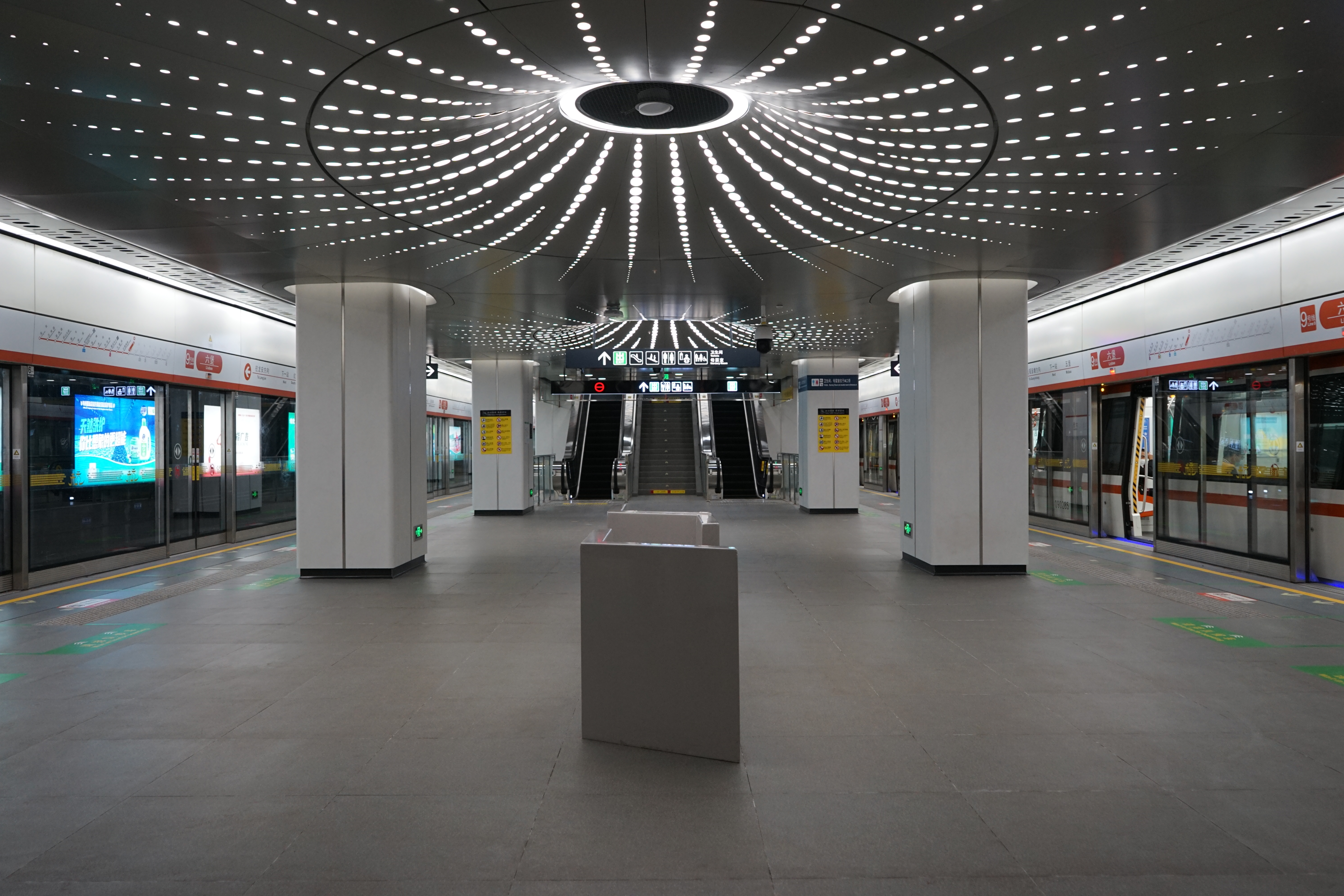
- Platform

General information
- Location: Qianjiang Road (钱江路); Shangcheng District, Hangzhou, Zhejiang; China
- Coordinates: 30°17′19″N 120°14′47″E
- Operated by: Hangzhou Metro Corporation
- Line: Line 9
- Platforms: 2 (1 island platform)

Construction
- Structure type: Underground
- Accessible: Yes

History
- Opened: 14 December 2022

Services
Preceding station	Hangzhou Metro	Following station
Wubao towards Guanyintang	Line 9	South Hongpu Road towards Long'an
Location

Liubao (Chinese: 六堡) is a metro station of Line 9 of the Hangzhou Metro in China. It is located in Shangcheng District of Hangzhou. The station was opened on 14 December 2022.

== Station layout ==
G	Ground level	Exits
B1	Concourse	Tickets, Customer Service Center
B2		← Line 9 towards Guanyintang (Wubao)
B2	Island platform, doors open on the left
B2		Line 9 towards Long'an (South Hongpu Road) →

=== Entrances/exits ===
- A: north side of Qianjiang Road, Sanguantang Road (三官塘路)
- B: north side of Qianjiang Road, Liubao Road (六堡路)
- C: opening soon

== Design ==
Liubao Station is positioned as a smart service platform, serving as the community service center for the entire area, and also as a future hub for experiencing smart living. The station's design draws inspiration from the most fundamental computer language, 0 and 1, using the assembly and combination of these elements to represent the future of a new digital urban ecosystem.

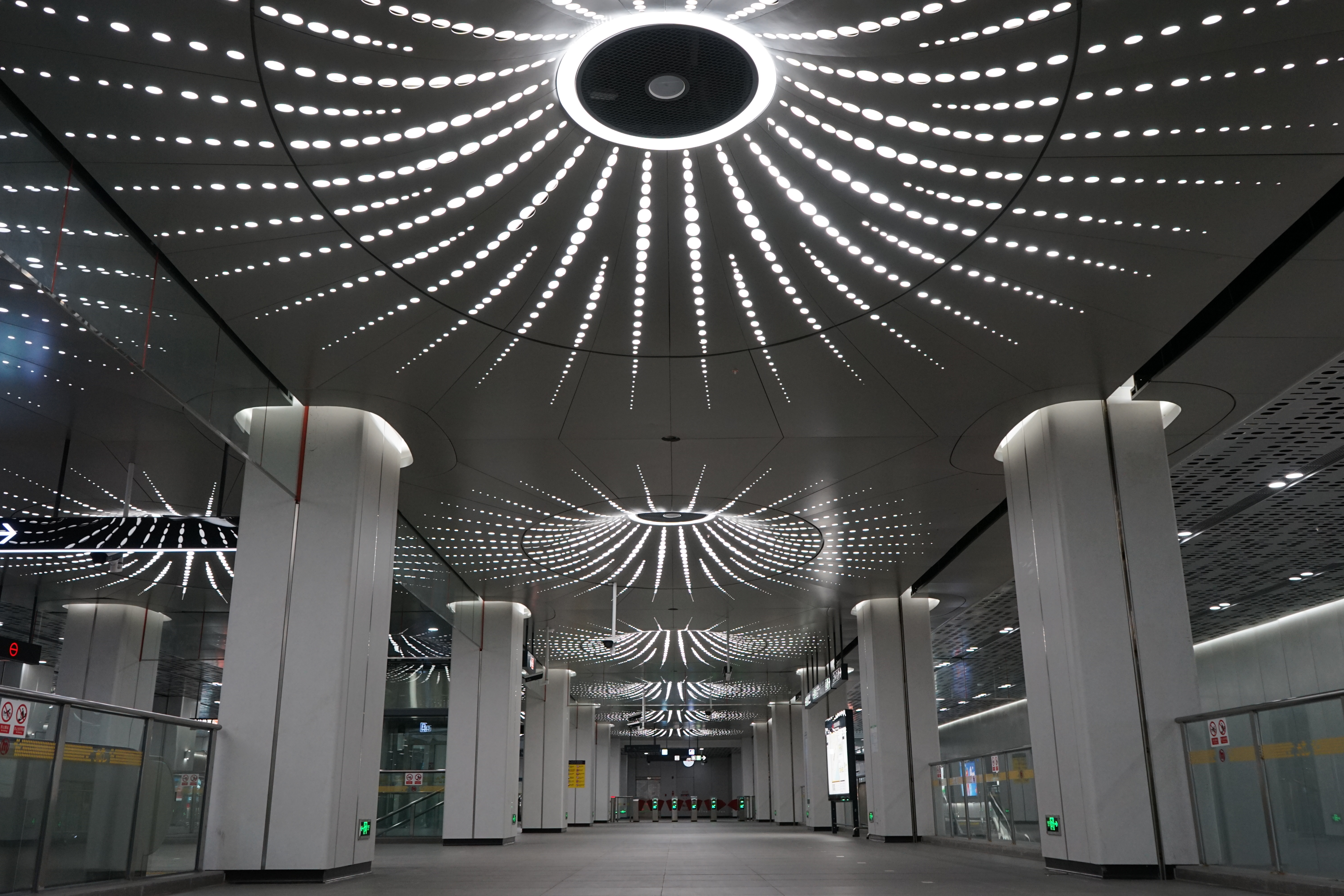
Ceiling of concourse

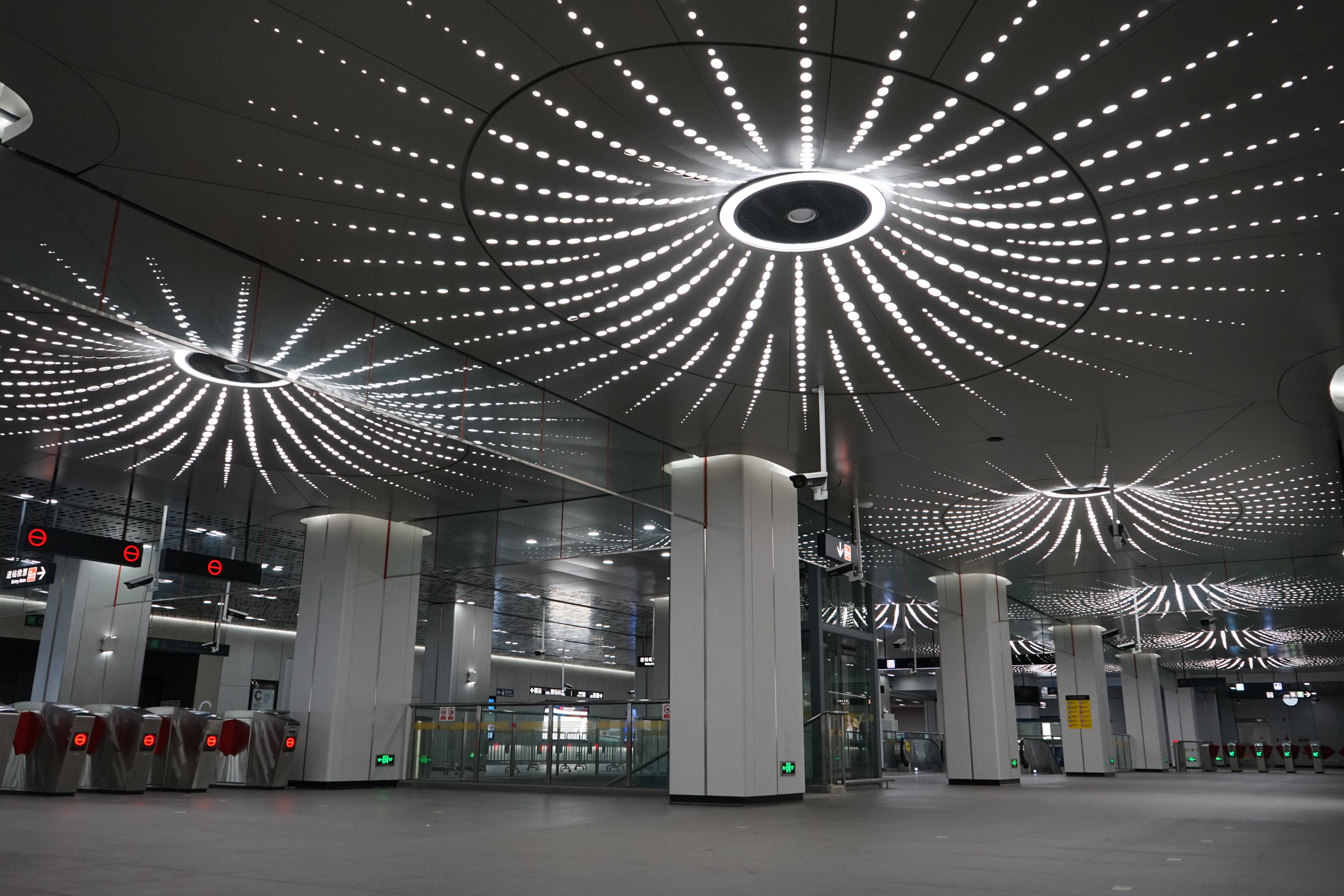
Concourse

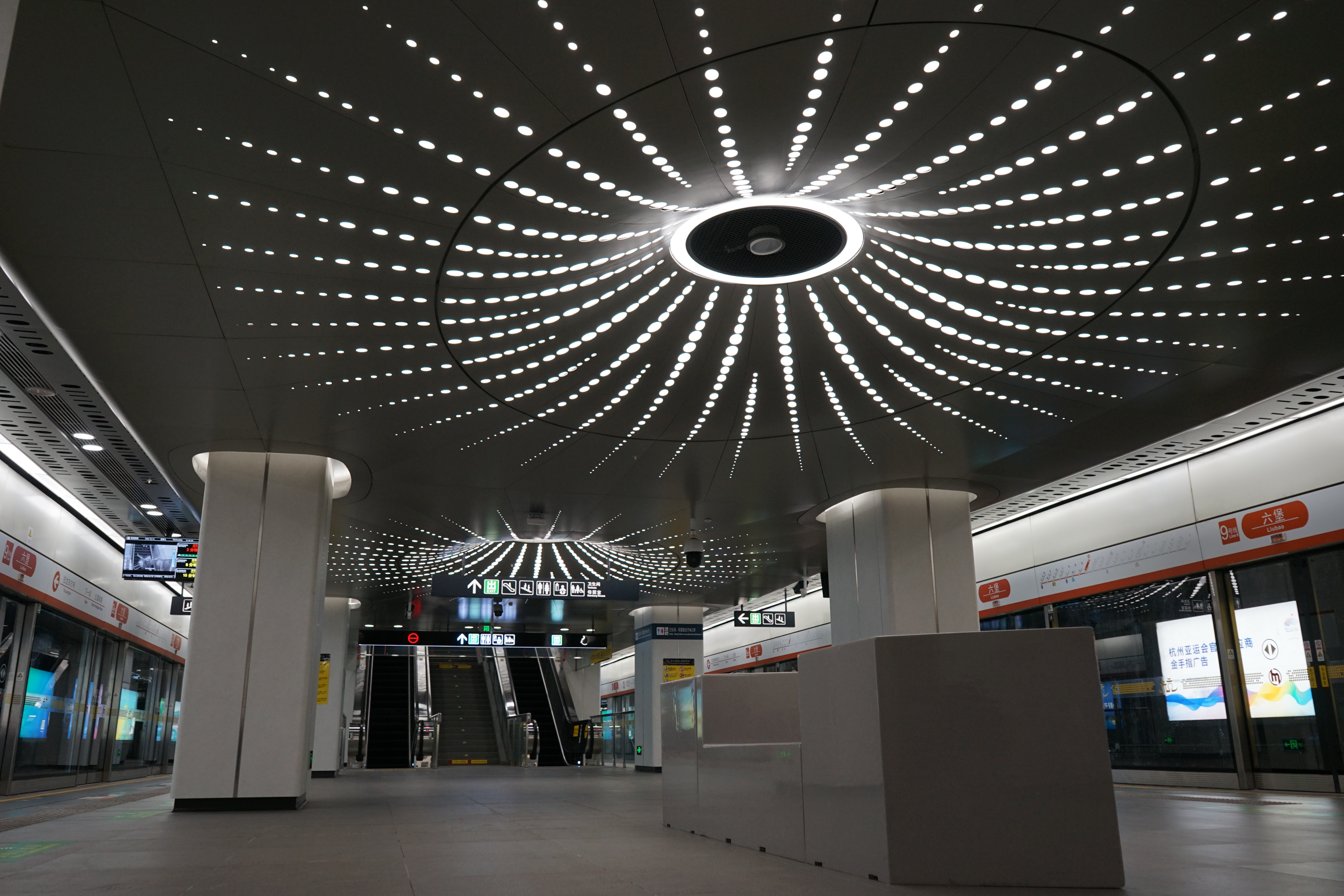
Platform

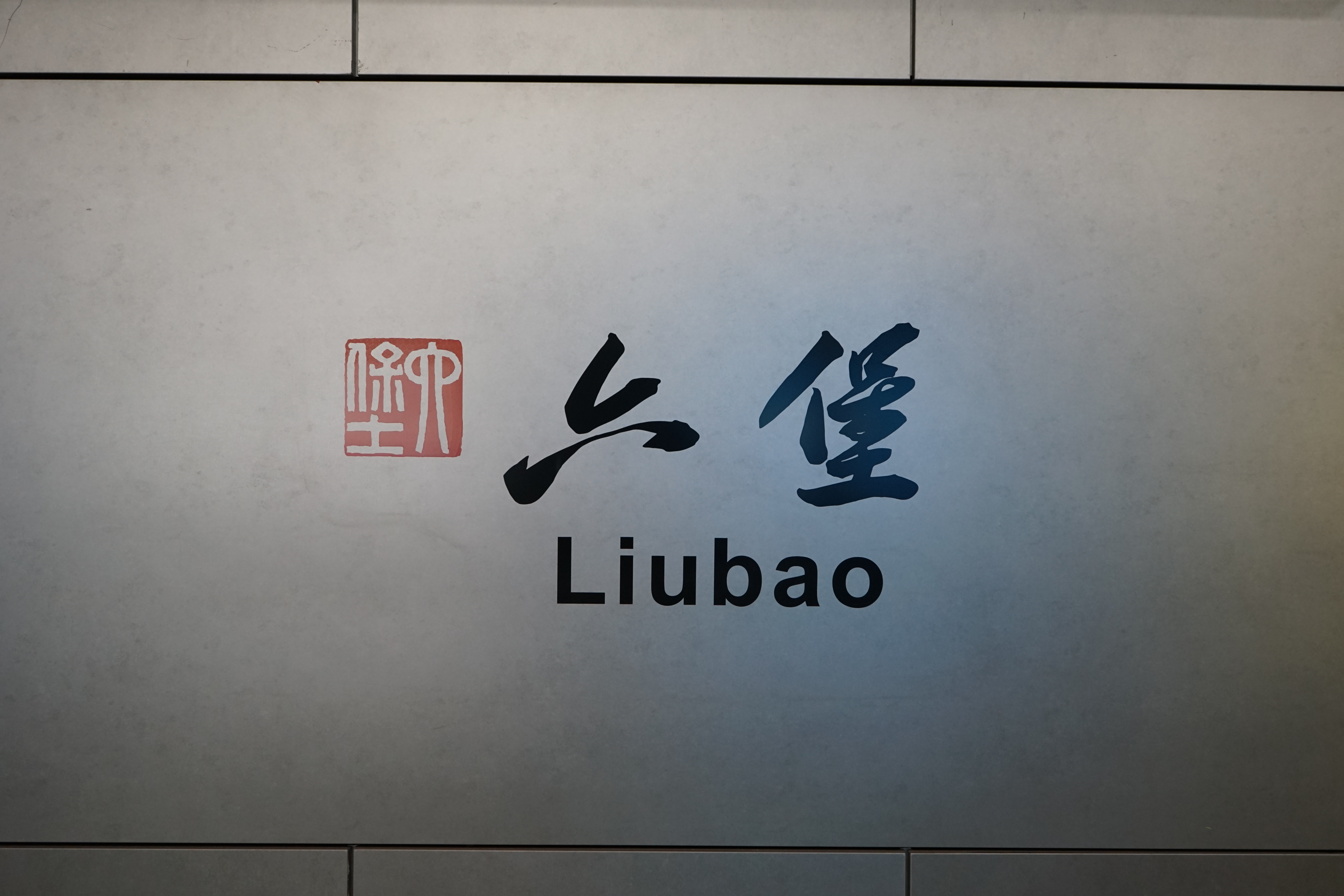
Name board
