= Wubao station =

Metro station in Hangzhou, China

Wubao 五堡
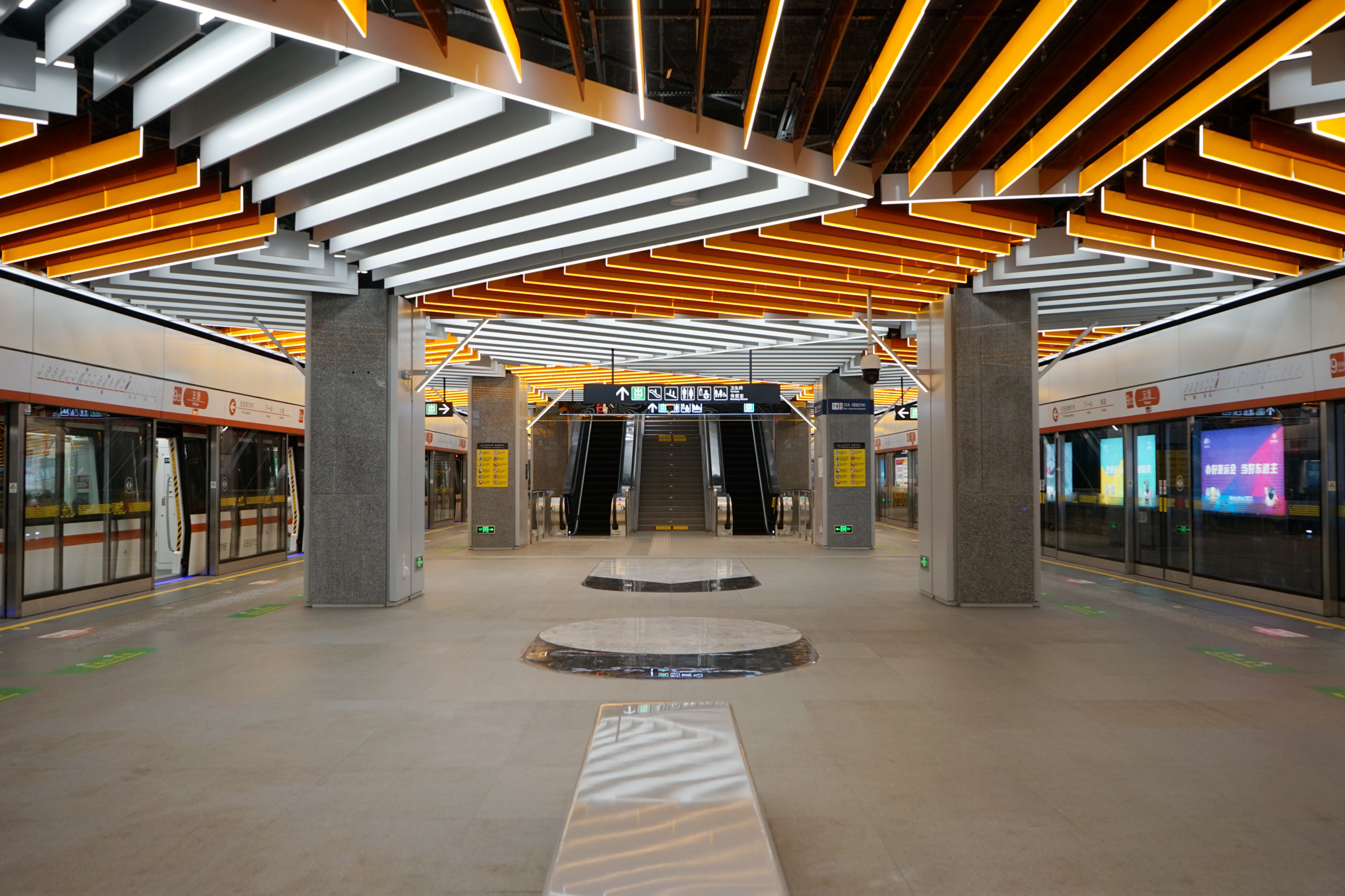
- Platform

General information
- Location: Qianjiang Road (钱江路); Shangcheng District, Hangzhou, Zhejiang; China
- Coordinates: 30°16′58″N 120°14′15″E
- Operated by: Hangzhou Metro Corporation
- Line: Line 9
- Platforms: 2 (1 island platform)

History
- Opened: 14 December 2022

Services
Preceding station	Hangzhou Metro	Following station
Yudao towards Guanyintang	Line 9	Liubao towards Long'an
Location

Wubao (Chinese: 五堡) is a metro station of Line 9 of the Hangzhou Metro in China. It is located in Shangcheng District of Hangzhou. The station was opened on 14 December 2022.

== Station layout ==
G	Ground level	Exits
B1	Concourse	Tickets, Customer Service Center
B2		← Line 9 towards Guanyintang (Yudao)
B2	Island platform, doors open on the left
B2		Line 9 towards Long'an (Liubao) →

=== Entrances/exits ===
- A: north side of Qianjiang Road, Tongxie Road (S) (同协南路)
- B: opening soon

== Design ==
Wubao Station is positioned as an international exchange center, providing a platform for various global interactions. The design of the station's central section features a prism-focused motif on the ceiling, while the floor is composed of a mosaic of colorful stones, symbolizing the convergence of the city's diverse elements.

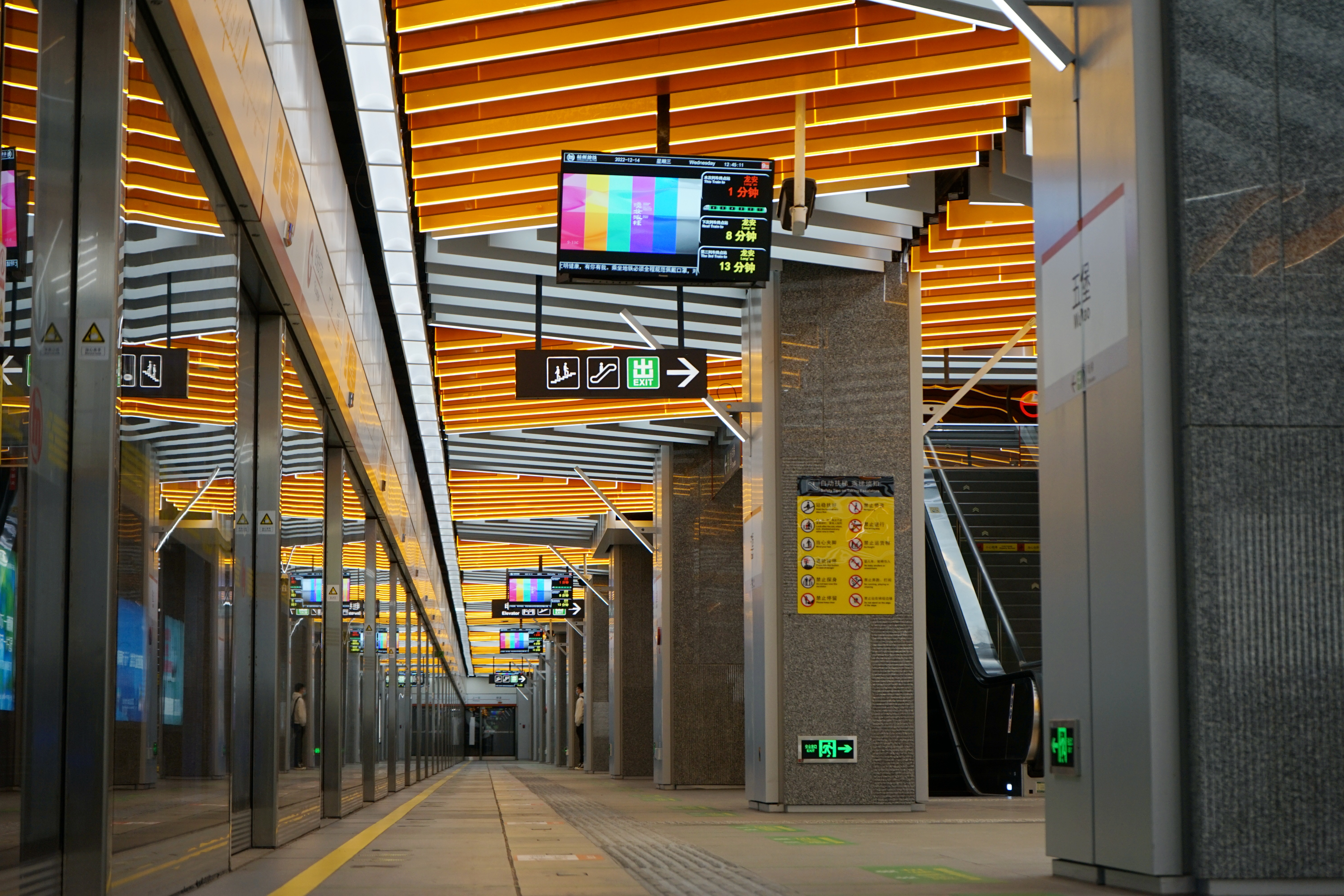
Platform towards Long'an

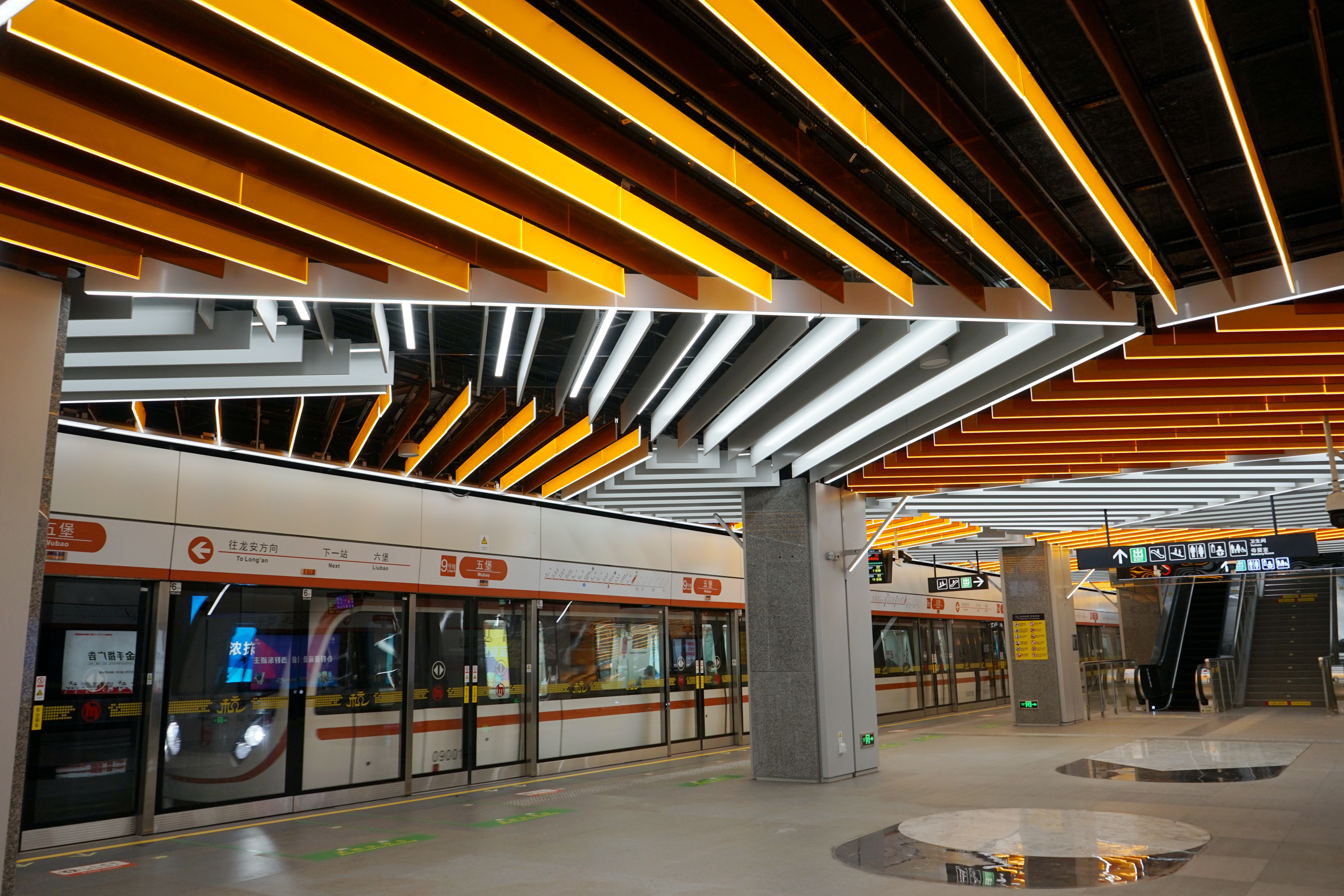
a train is approaching

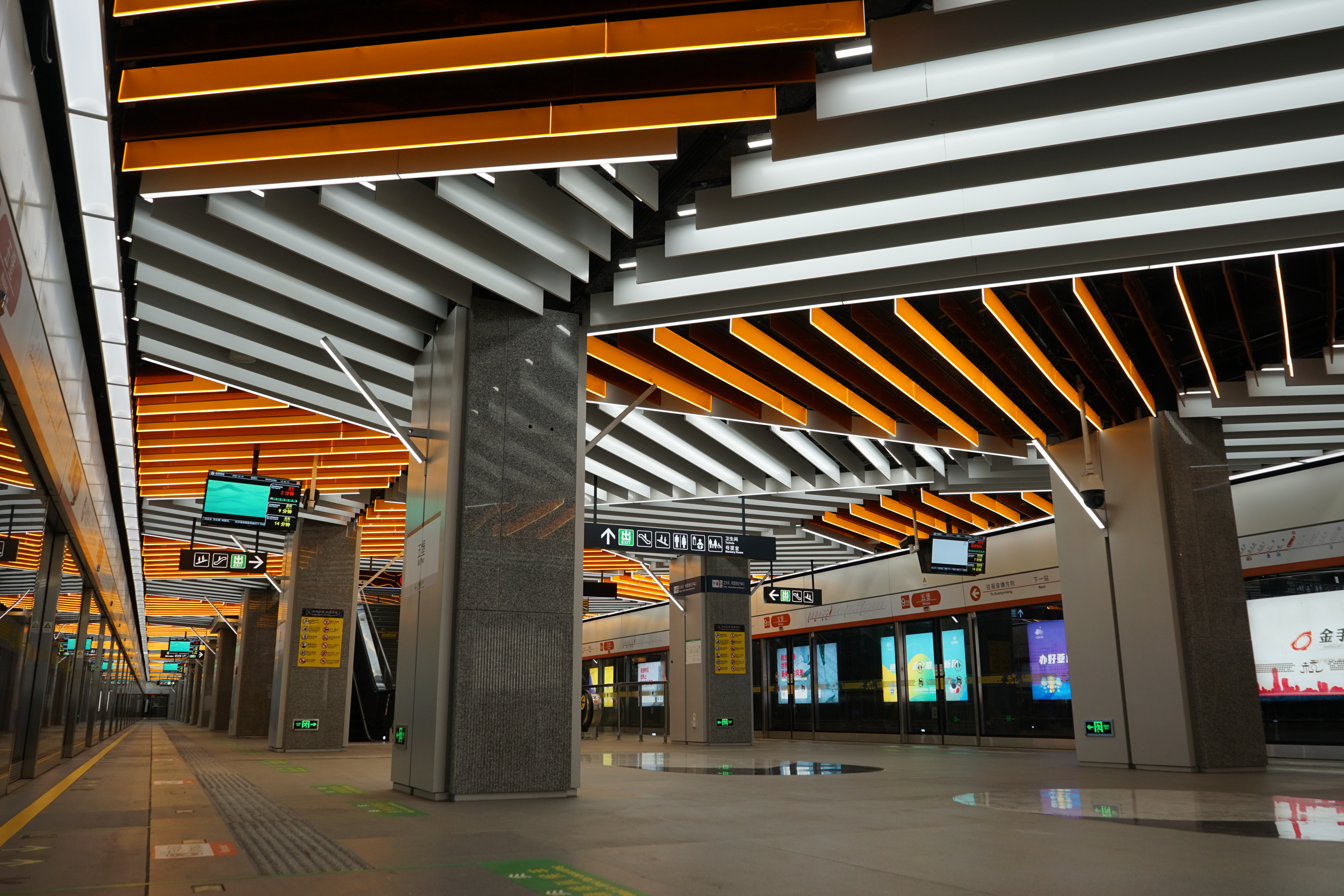
Platform

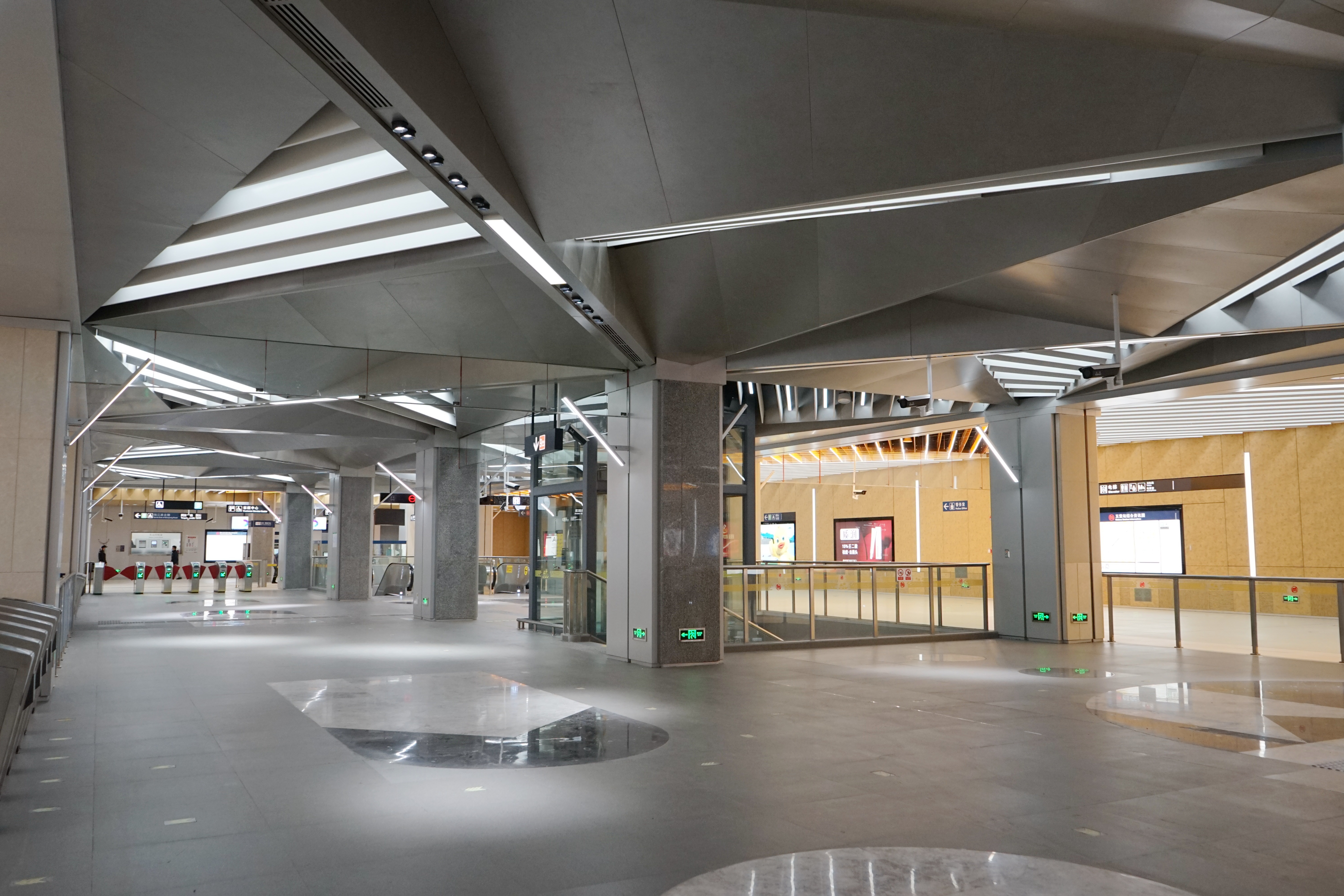
Concourse of Paid Area

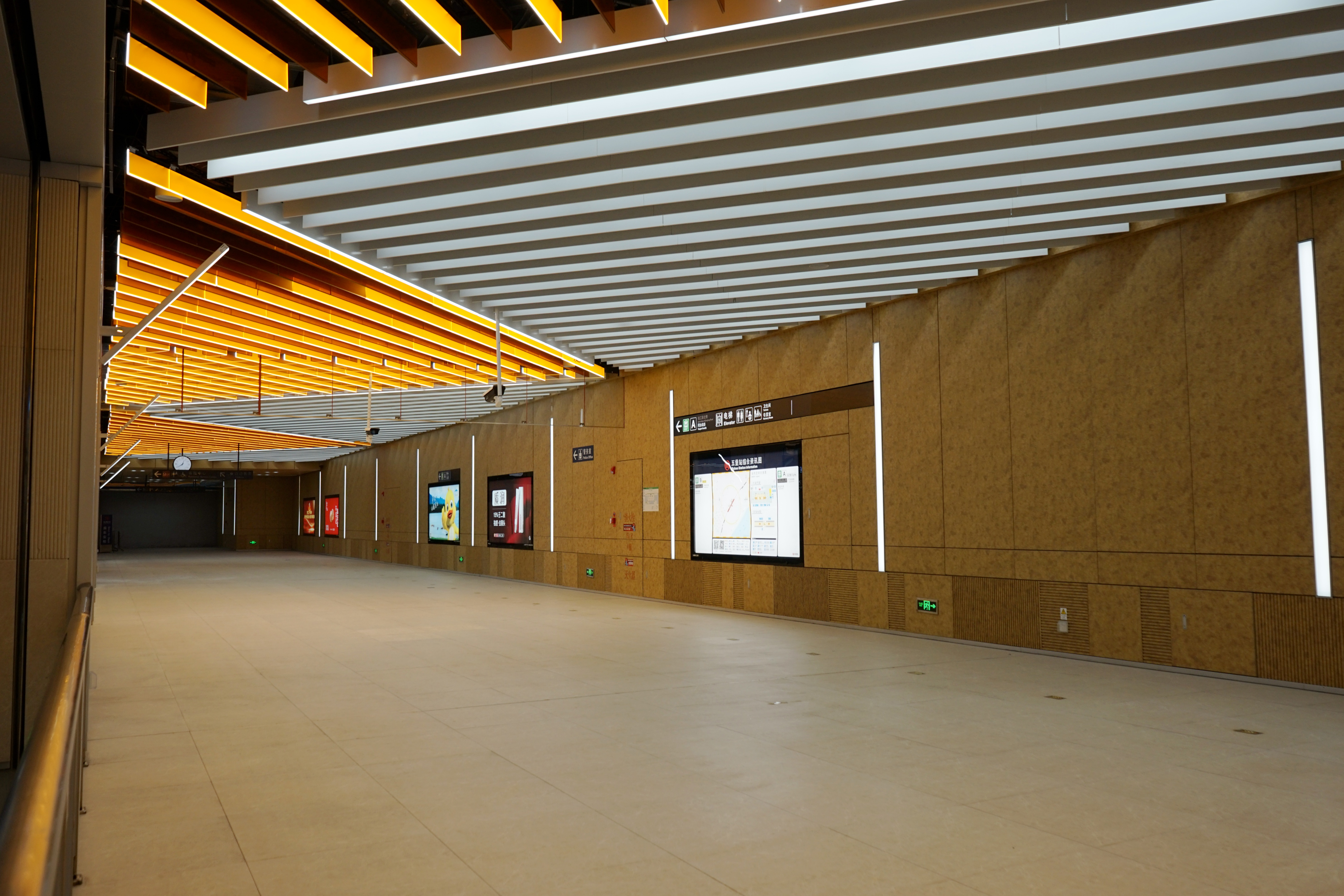
Concourse of Non-Paid Area

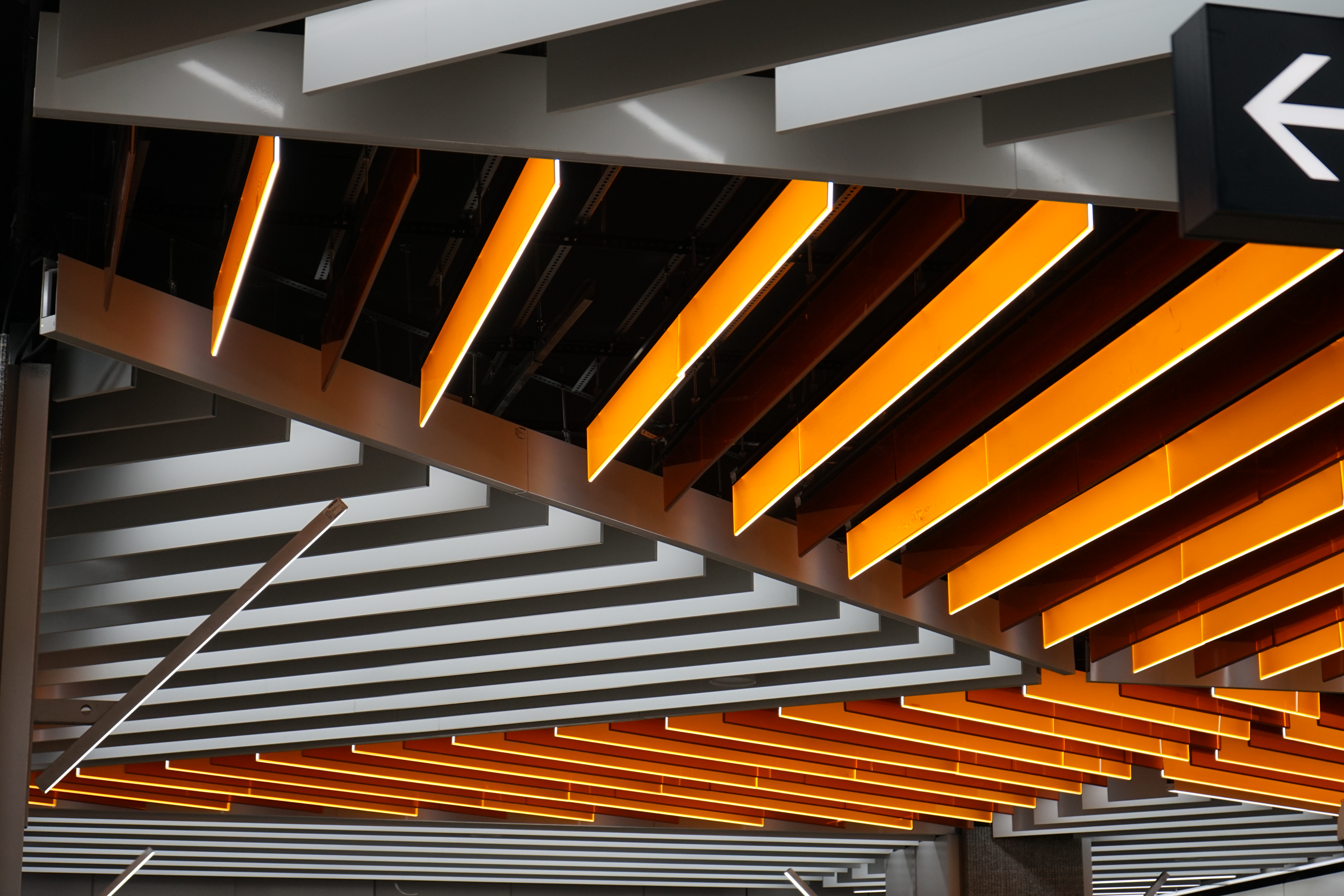
Ceiling

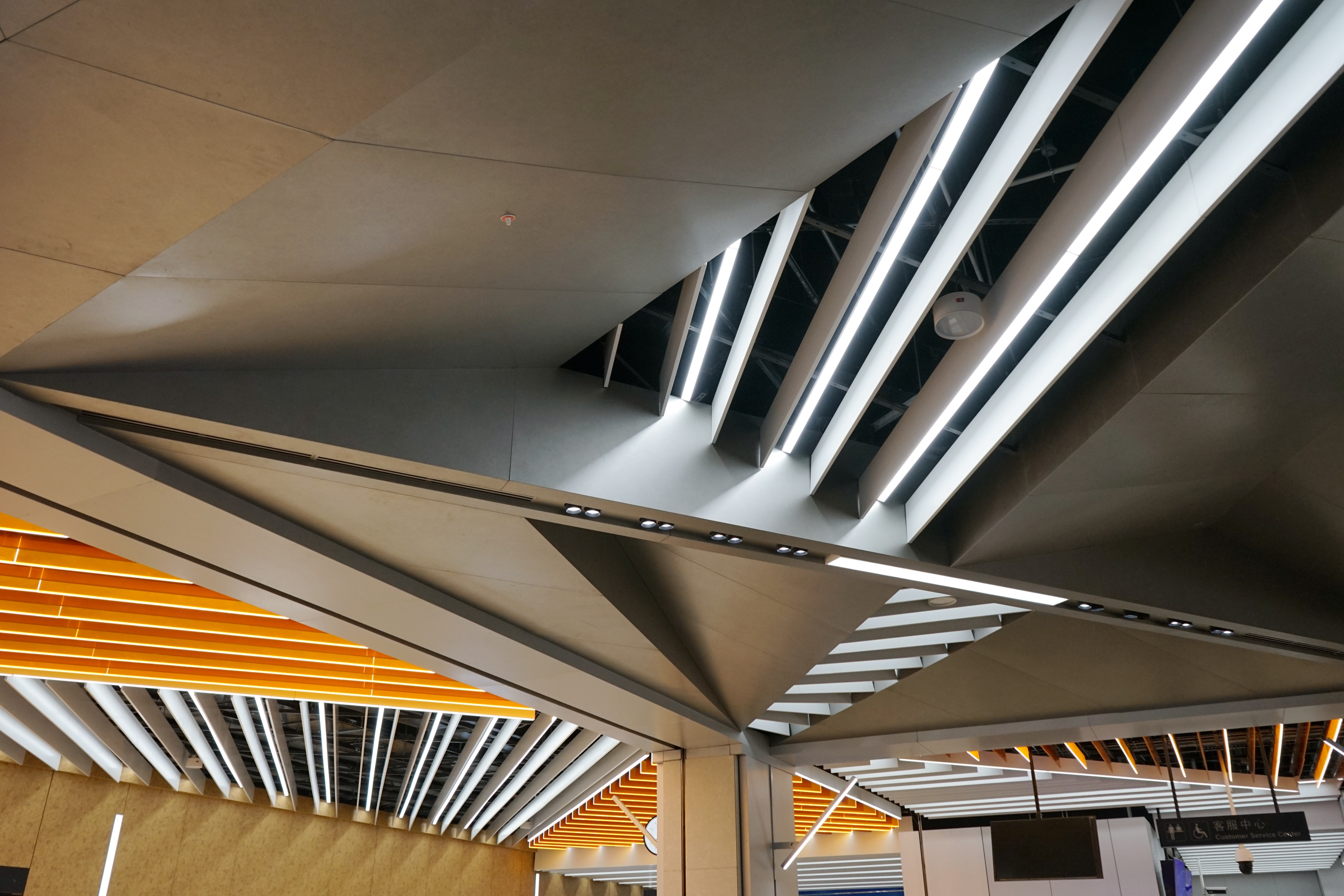
Ceiling

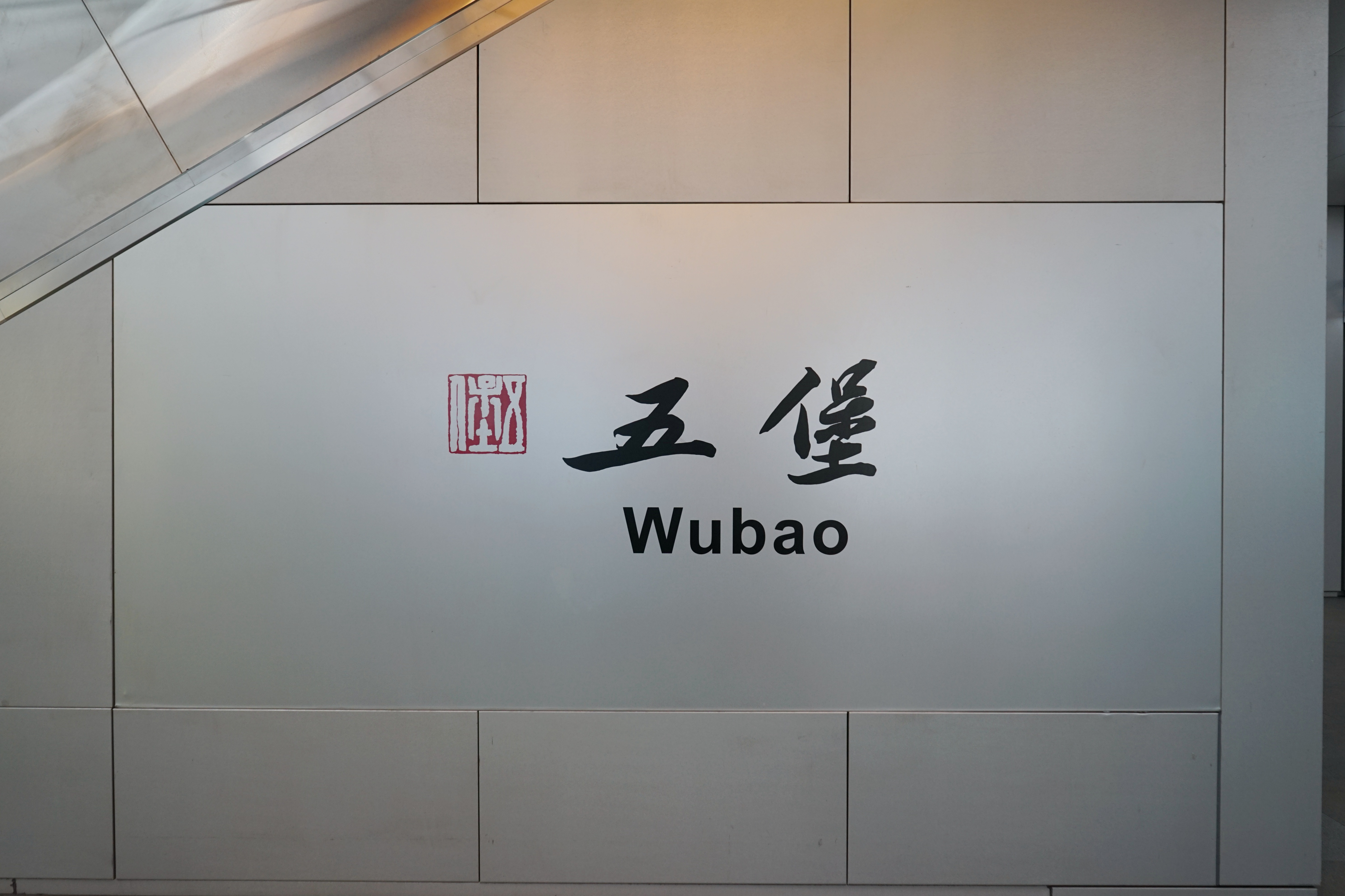
Name board
