= Sanbao station =

Metro station in Hangzhou, China

Sanbao 三堡
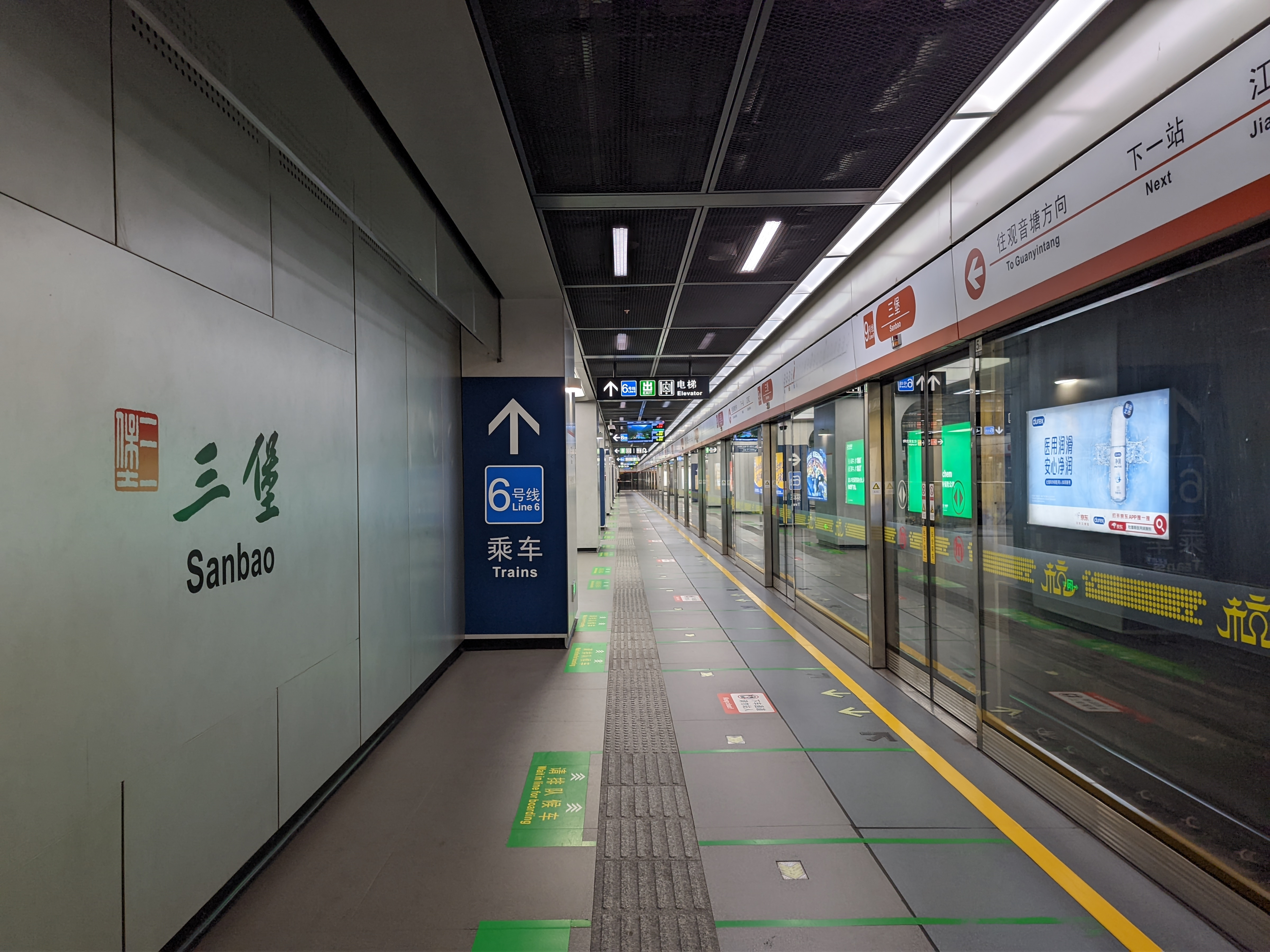
- Line 9 platform

General information
- Location: Qianjiang Road (钱江路) × Yunhe Road (E) (运河东路); Shangcheng District, Hangzhou, Zhejiang; China
- Coordinates: 30°16′09″N 120°13′24″E
- Operated by: Hangzhou Metro Corporation
- Lines: Line 6 Line 9
- Platforms: 4 (2 island platform)

Construction
- Structure type: Underground
- Accessible: Yes

History
- Opened: 6 November 2021 (Line 6); 1 April 2022 (Line 9)

Services
Preceding station	Hangzhou Metro	Following station
Asian Games Village towards West Guihua Road or Shuangpu	Line 6	Tanhua'an Road towards Goujulong
Jianghehui towards Guanyintang	Line 9	Yudao towards Long'an
Location

Sanbao (Chinese: 三堡) is a metro station of Line 6 and Line 9 of the Hangzhou Metro in China. It is located in Shangcheng District of Hangzhou. The Line 6 part of the station was opened on 6 November 2021. The Line 9 part was opened on 1 April 2022.

== Station layout ==
Sanbao has four levels: basement 1 is a concourse, basements 3 and 4 are the platform levels for lines 9 and 6. Each of these consists of an island platform with two tracks.

=== Entrances/exits ===
- A: north side of Qianjiang Road, Duhui Alley (都会巷)
- B1: north side of Qianjiang Road, Yulin Road (御临路)
- B2: north side of Qianjiang Road, Yunhe Road (E)
- D: opening soon
- E: opening soon
- F: Yuntang Street (运塘街), Duhui Alley

== Design ==
Sanbao Station is located near the intersection of the Grand Canal and Qiantang River, highlighting the close relationship between urban development and these waterways, forming a cityscape intertwined with the rivers. The station primarily uses lighting ambiance and a miniature representation of the city's framework to reflect the harmonious coexistence of "you in me, me in you," symbolizing the era's vision of mutual symbiosis.

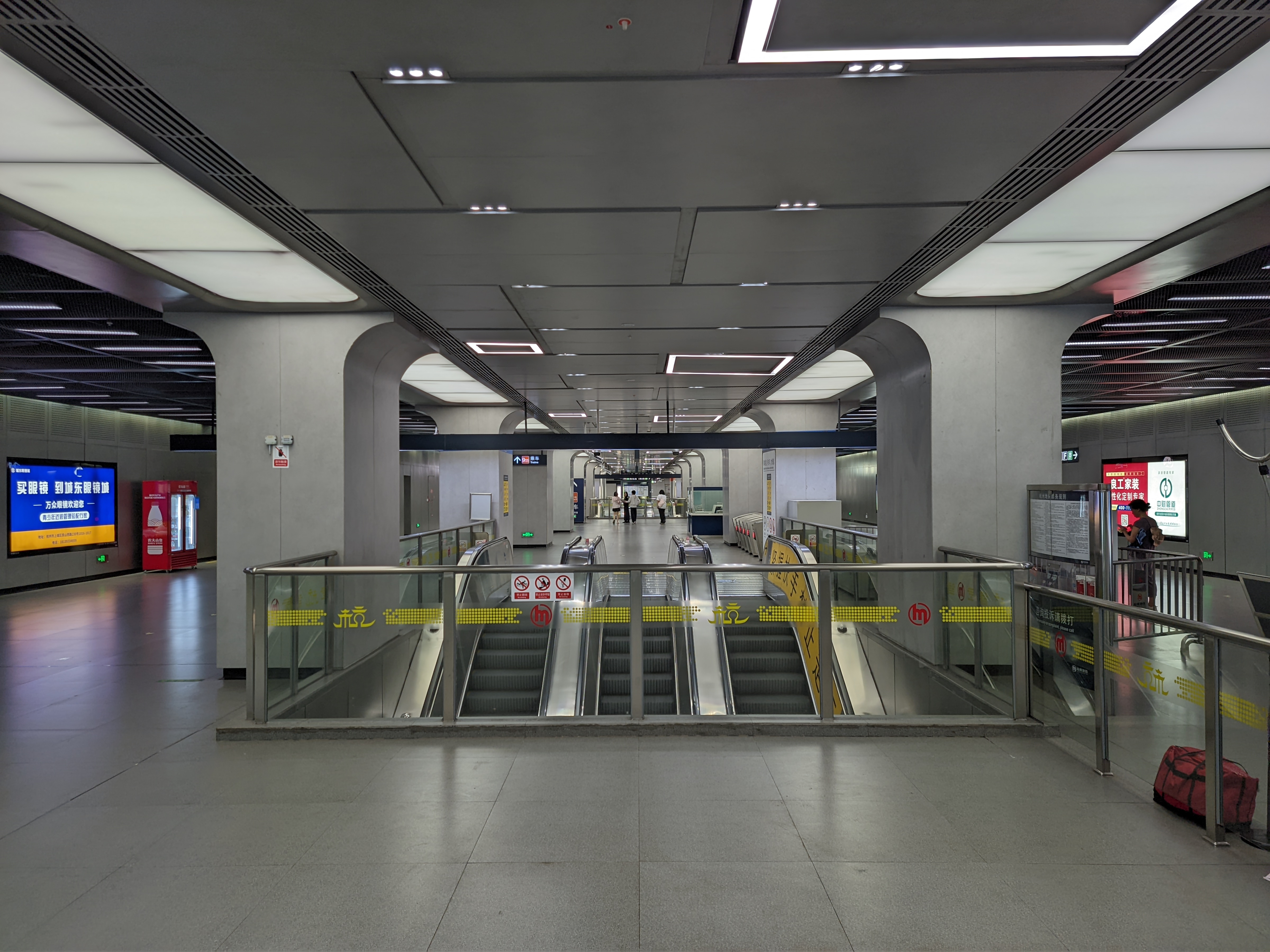
Line 6 concourse

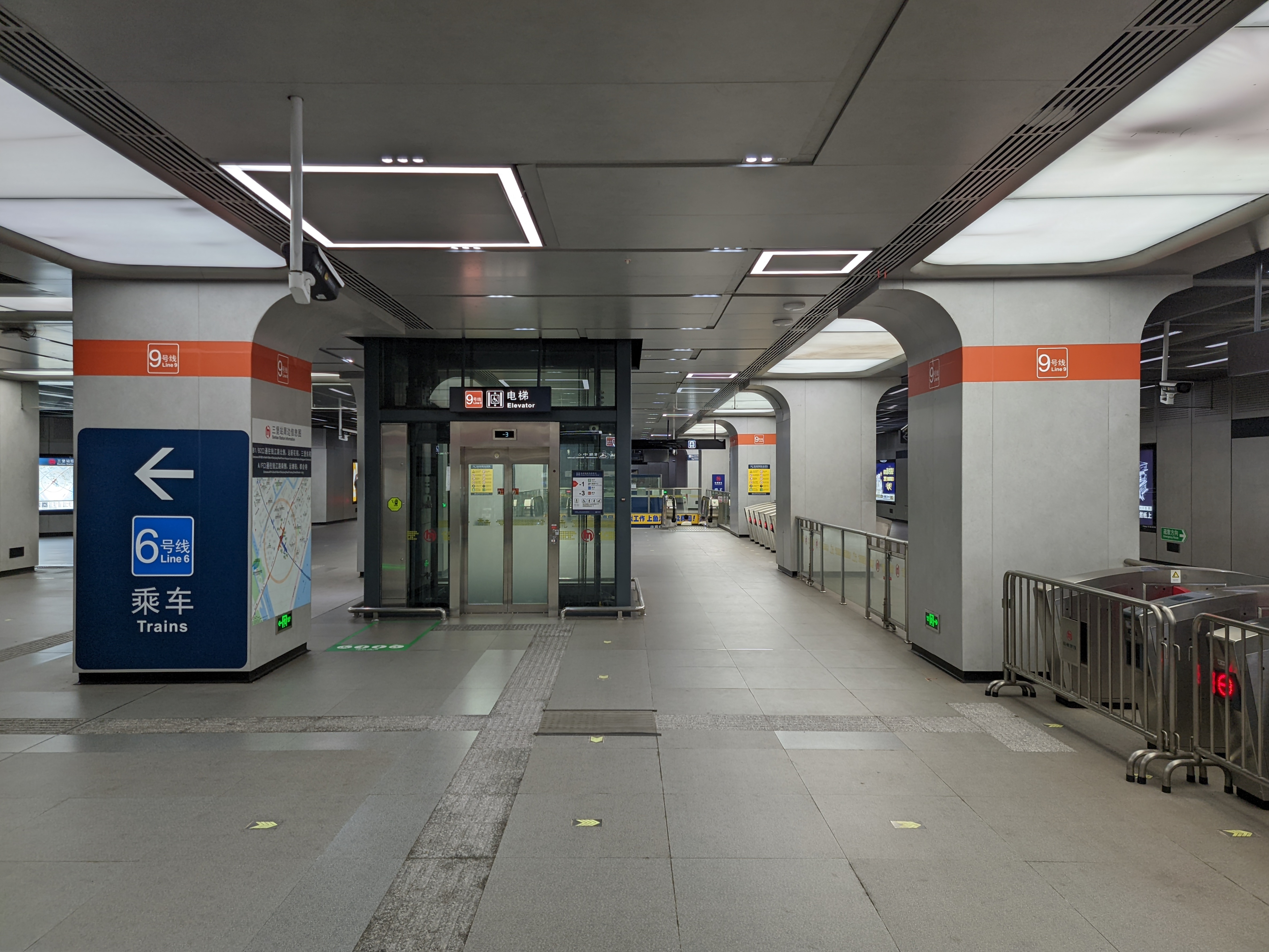
Line 9 concourse

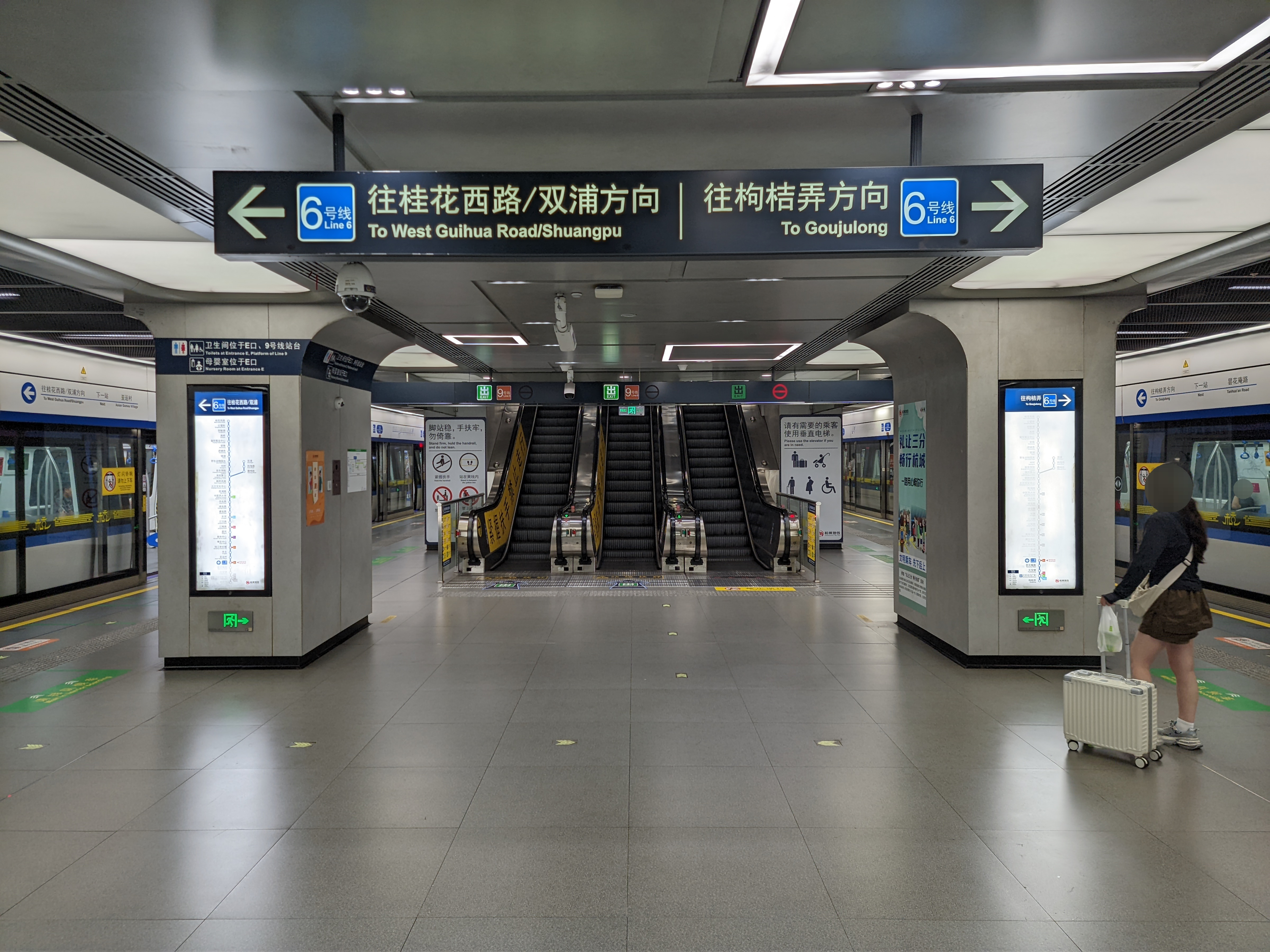
Line 6 platforms

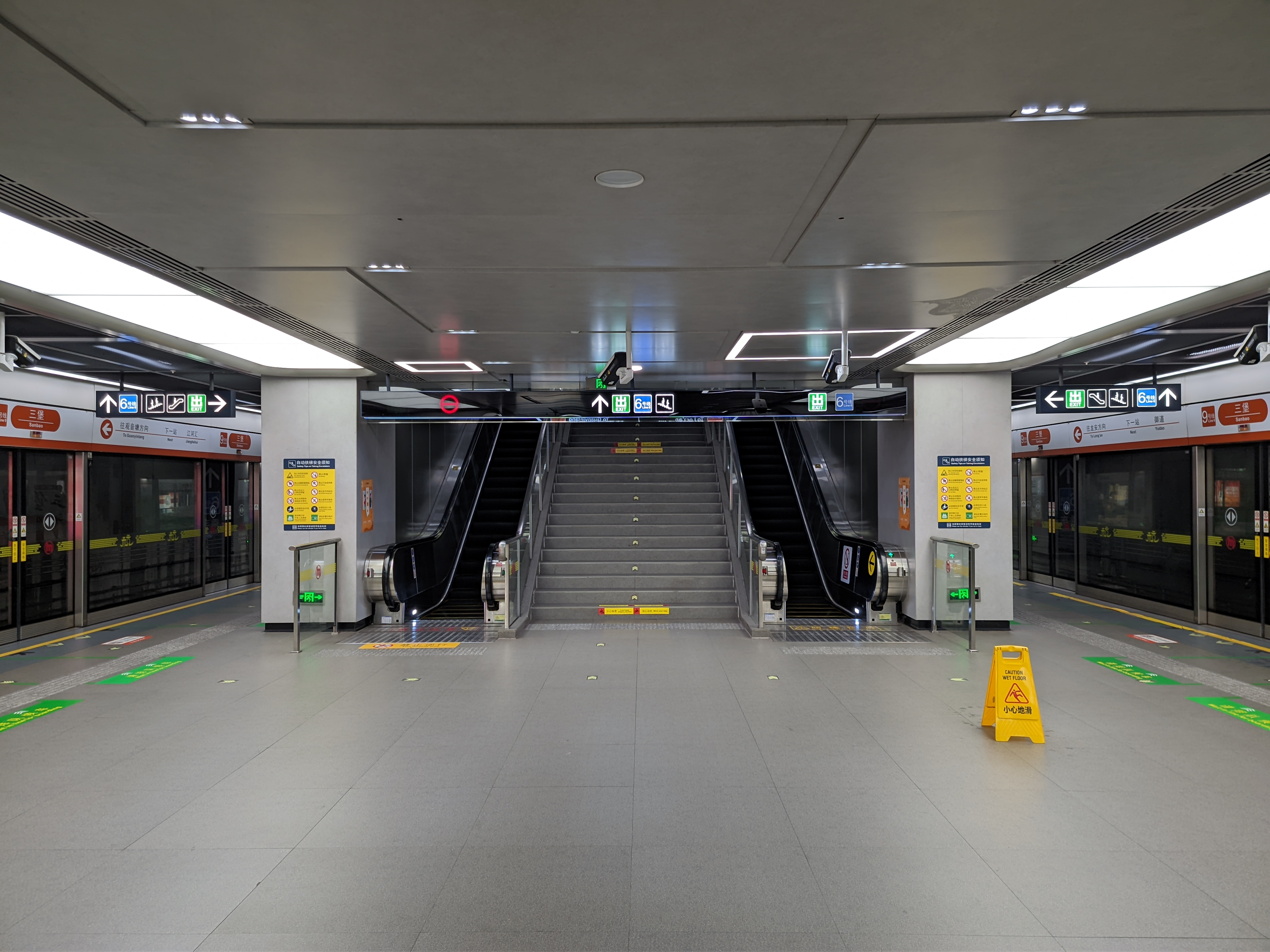
Line 9 platforms
