= Wuzhou Road station =

Metro station in Hangzhou, China

Wuzhou Road 五洲路
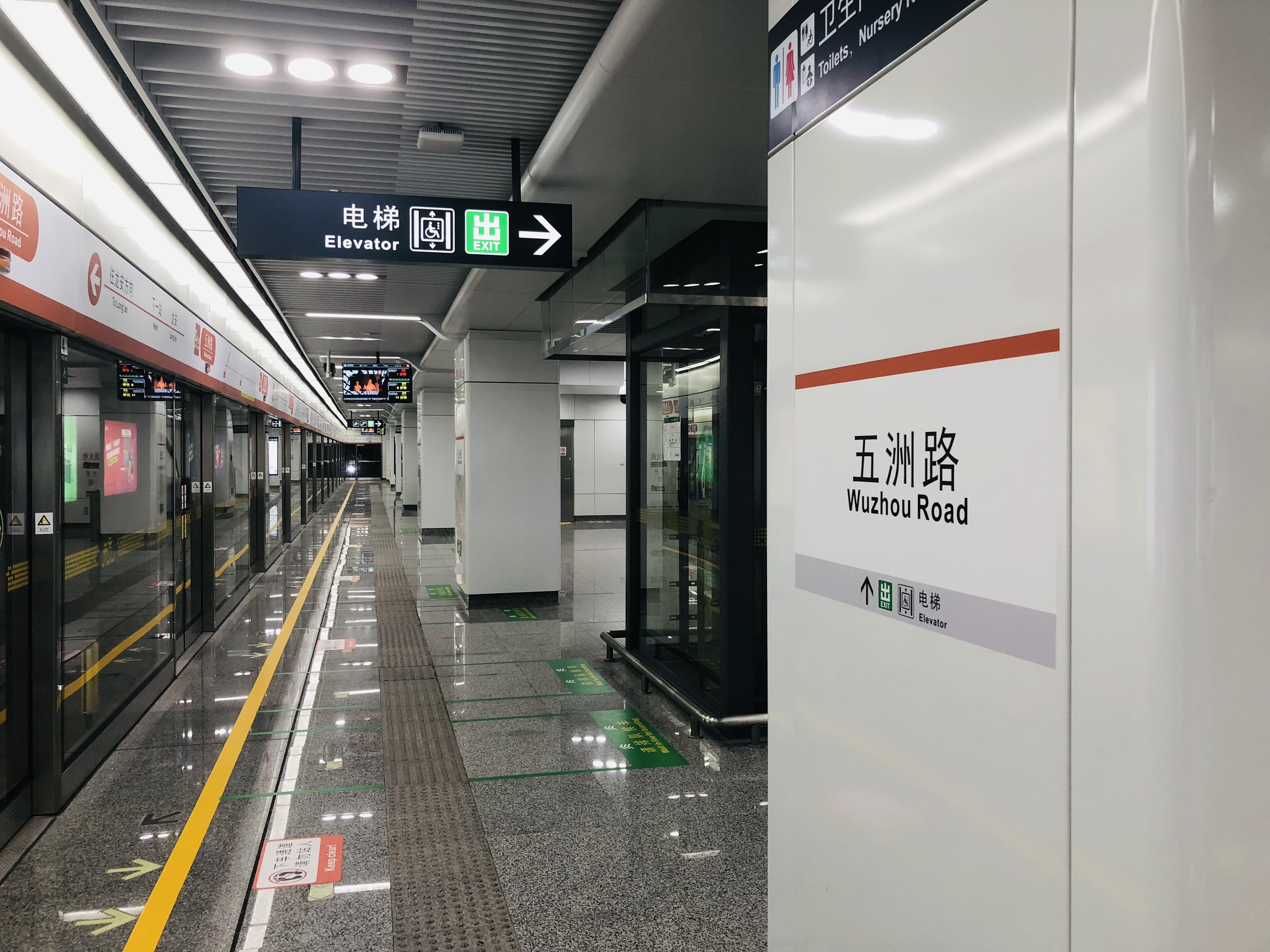

General information
- Location: Linping District, Hangzhou, Zhejiang; China
- Coordinates: 30°26′50″N 120°16′28″E
- Operated by: Hangzhou Metro Corporation
- Line: Line 9
- Platforms: 2 (1 island platform)

History
- Opened: 17 September 2021

Services
Preceding station	Hangzhou Metro	Following station
Heyu Road towards Guanyintang	Line 9	Long'an Terminus
Location

Wuzhou Road (Chinese: 五洲路) is a metro station of Line 9 of the Hangzhou Metro in China. It is located in Linping District of Hangzhou. The station was opened on 17 September 2021.
