= Line 9 (Hangzhou Metro) =

Metro line of the Hangzhou Metro system in China

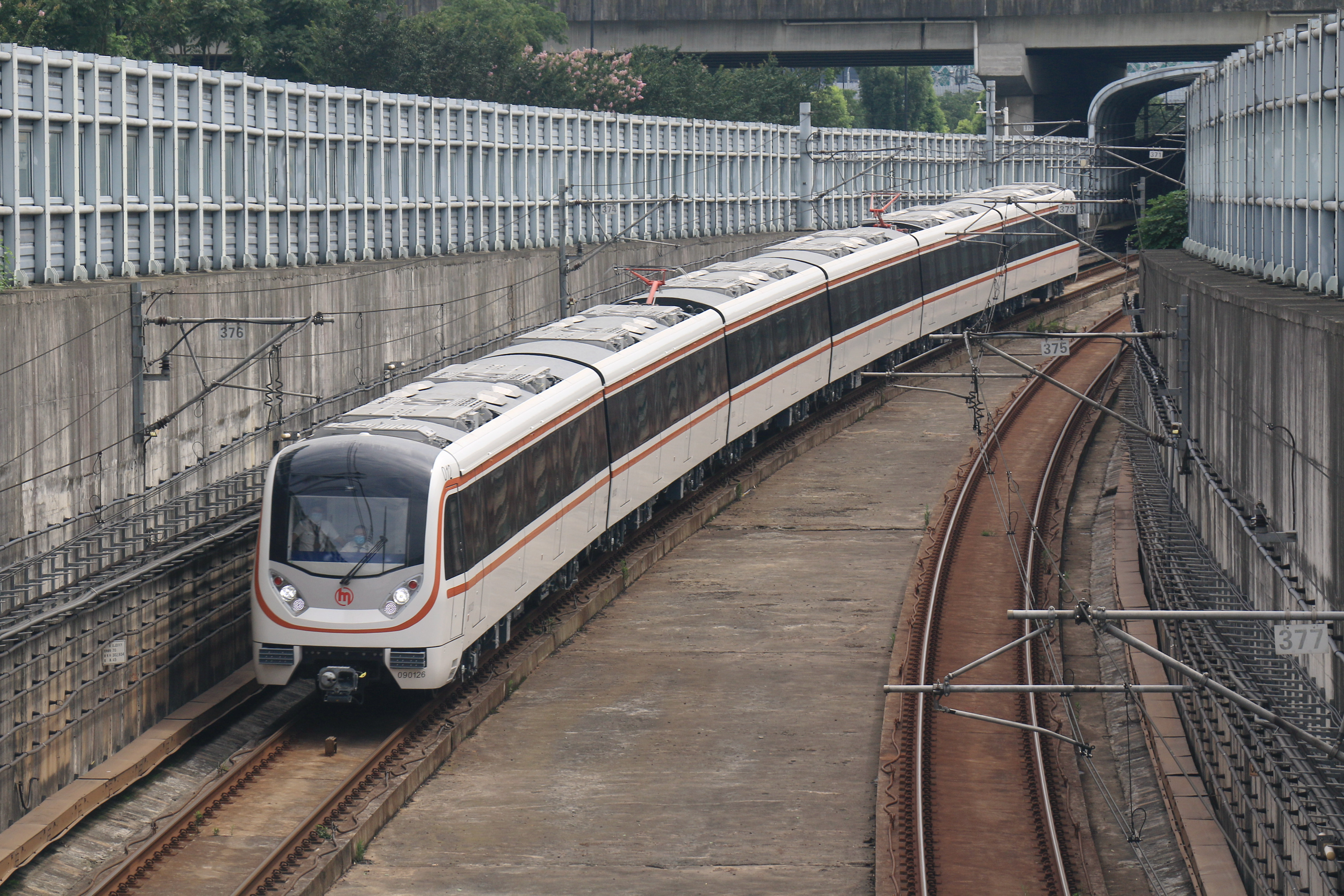
- Line 9 train

Overview
- Status: Operational
- Owner: City of Hangzhou
- Locale: Hangzhou, Zhejiang, China
- Termini: Guanyintang; Long'an
- Stations: 21

Service
- Type: Rapid transit
- System: Hangzhou Metro
- Services: 1
- Operator: Hangzhou Metro Corporation
- Depot(s): Changda Road Depot; Sibao Stabling Yard
- Rolling stock: PM145

History
- Opened: 10 July 2021; 5 years ago

Technical
- Line length: 29.45 km (18.30 mi)
- Num of tracks: 2
- Character: Underground and Elevated
- Track gauge: 1,435 mm (4 ft 8 1/2 in)
- Electrification: Overhead, 1500 V DC
- Operating speed: 80 km/h (50 mph)

Line 9 drawn to scale.

Line 9 of the Hangzhou Metro (simplified Chinese: 杭州地铁九号线; traditional Chinese: 杭州地鐵九號線; pinyin: Hángzhōu Dìtiě Jiǔhào Xiàn) is a metro line in Hangzhou. The line is 29.45 km (18.30 mi) long and runs in a north–south direction between Guanyintang and Long'an. The line is colored brown on system maps.

== Opening timeline ==
Segment	Commencement	Length	Station(s)	Name
Coach Center — Linping	24 November 2012; 13 years ago (Note: as part of Line 1); 10 July 2021; 5 years ago (Note: Line 9 commencement)	12.5 km (7.8 mi)	7	Central section of Phase 1
Linping — Long'an	17 September 2021; 5 years ago	6.2 km (3.9 mi)	4	North section of Phase 1
Guanyintang — Coach Center (except Liubao and Wubao)	1 April 2022; 4 years ago	12 km (7.5 mi)	10	South section of Phase 1
Liubao and Wubao	14 December 2022; 3 years ago		2	Infill stations

== Stations ==
Legend

- Operational
- Testing, opening in Dec 2026

Section	Station name		Connections	Distance km		Location
Section	English	Chinese	Connections	Distance km		Location
Phase II	Tangqi	塘栖				Linping
Phase II	Gangbei Road	港北路				Linping
Phase II	Xingsheng Road	兴盛路				Linping
Phase II	Quanzhang	泉漳				Linping
Phase II	Kangtai Road	康泰路				Linping
Phase II	Xingyuan Road	兴元路				Linping
Phase II	Kangxin Road	康信路				Linping
North	Long'an	龙安		0	0	Linping
North	Wuzhou Road	五洲路				Linping
North	Heyu Road	荷禹路				Linping
North	Qiushan Avenue	邱山大街				Linping
Central	Linping	临平				Linping
Central	Nanyuan	南苑				Linping
Central	Linpingnan Railway Station	临平南高铁站	Hanghai; EVH			Linping
Central	Wengmei	翁梅				Linping
Central	Qiaosi	乔司				Linping
Central	South Qiaosi	乔司南				Linping
Central	Coach Center	客运中心	1			Shangcheng
South	Jiumu Road	九睦路				Shangcheng
South	South Hongpu Road	红普南路				Shangcheng
South	Liubao	六堡				Shangcheng
South	Wubao	五堡				Shangcheng
South	Yudao	御道	19			Shangcheng
South	Sanbao	三堡	6			Shangcheng
South	Jianghehui	江河汇				Shangcheng
South	Qianjiang Road	钱江路	2 4			Shangcheng
South	Xinye Road	新业路				Shangcheng
South	Guanyintang	观音塘	7			Shangcheng

== Rolling stock ==
Stock	Class	Year built	Builder	Number built	Numbers	Formation	Depots	Line assigned	Notes
PM145	B	2020-2022	CRRC Nanjing Puzhen	186 (31 sets)	09 001 - 09 031 (090011-090316)	Tc+Mp+M+M+Mp+Tc	Changda Road Depot; Sibao Yard	9	

== See also ==
- Hangzhou Metro
