= Long'an station =

Metro station in Hangzhou, China

Long'an 龙安
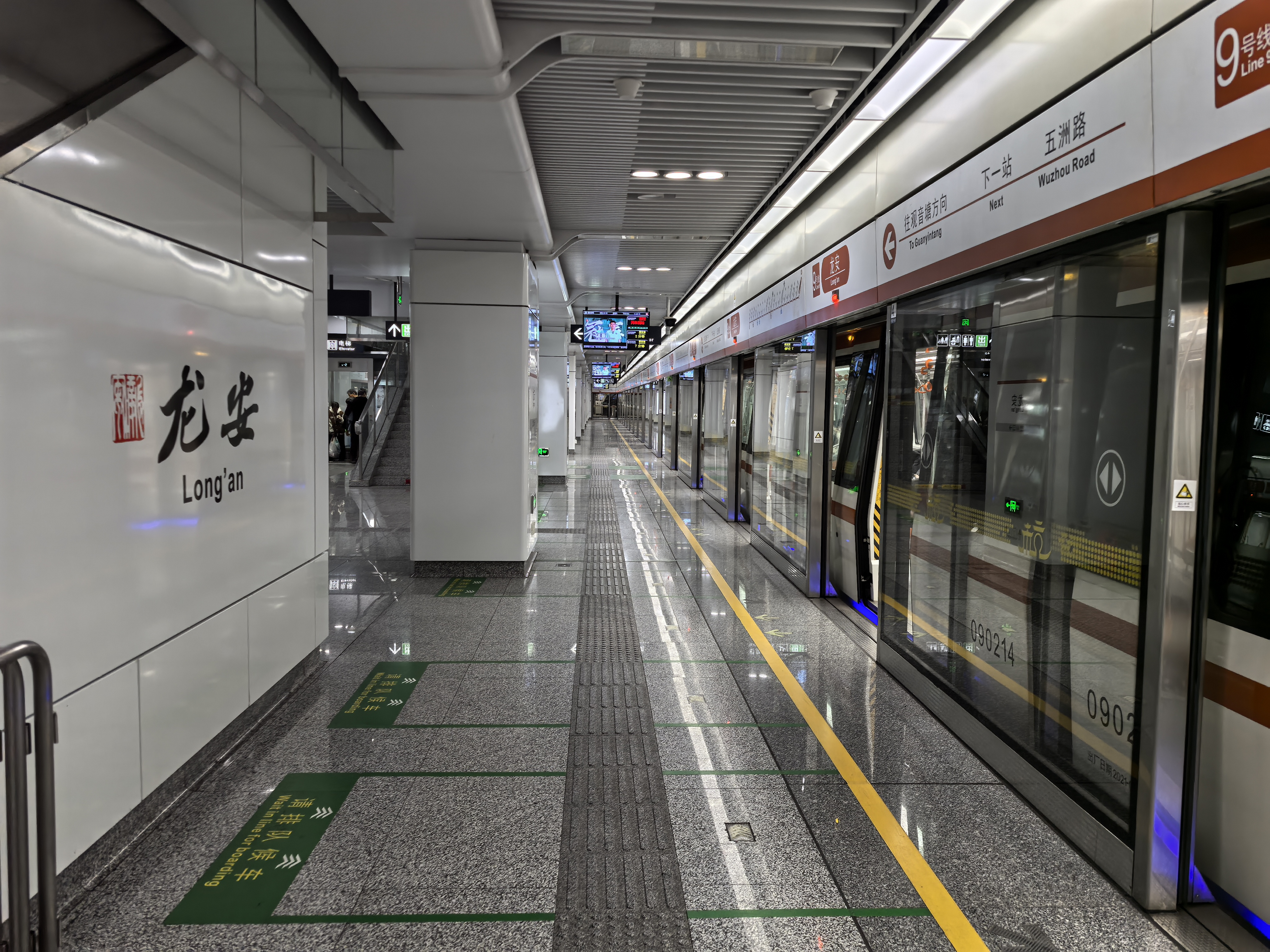

General information
- Location: Linping District, Hangzhou, Zhejiang; China
- Coordinates: 30.4578°N 120.2690°E
- Operated by: Hangzhou Metro Corporation
- Line: Line 9
- Platforms: 2 (1 island platform)

History
- Opened: 17 September 2021

Services
Preceding station	Hangzhou Metro	Following station
Wuzhou Road towards Guanyintang	Line 9	Terminus
Location

Long'an (Chinese: 龙安) is a metro station of Line 9 of the Hangzhou Metro in China. It is located in Linping District of Hangzhou. The station was opened on 17 September 2021.
