= Guanyintang station =

Metro station in Hangzhou, China

Guanyintang 观音塘
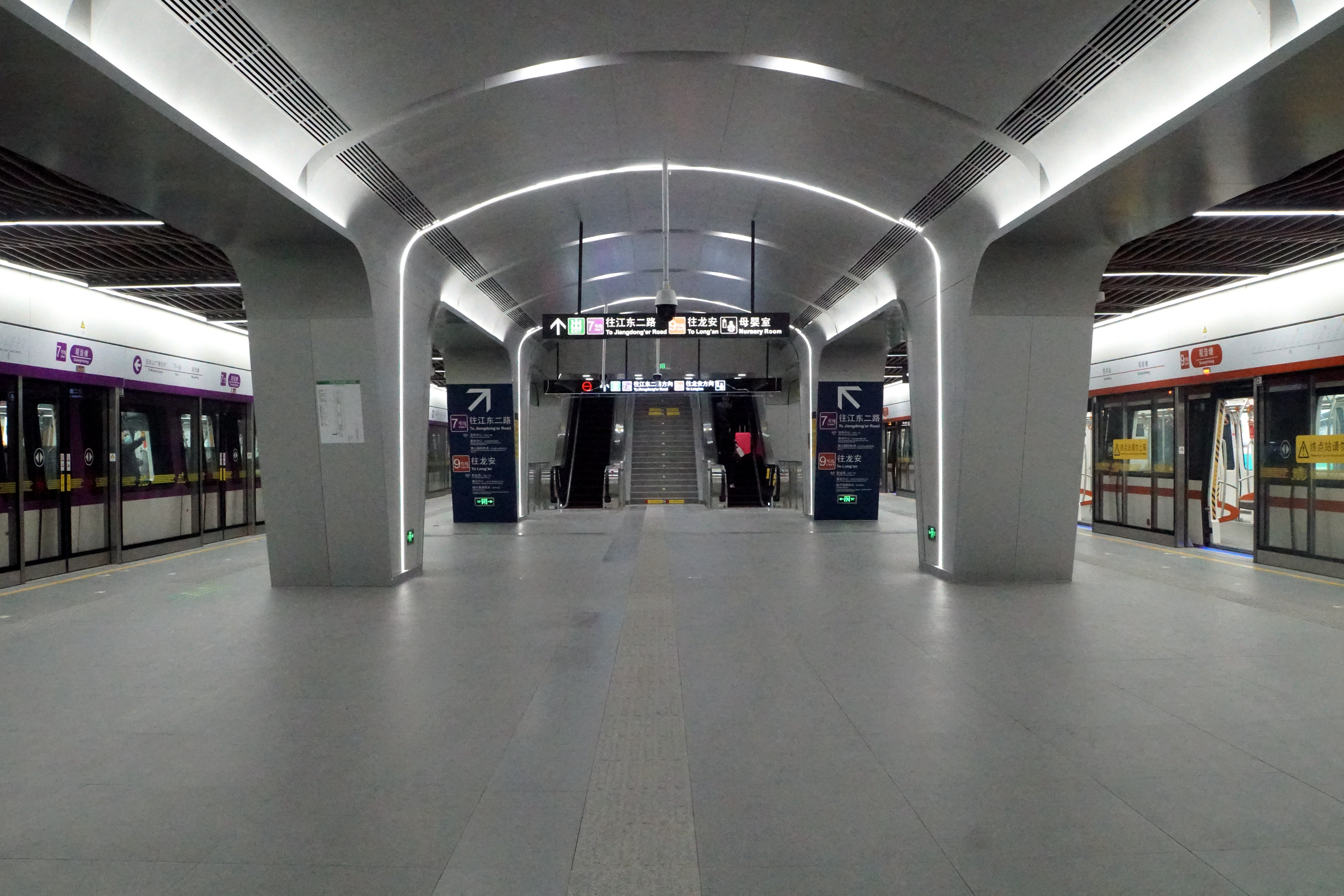
- Platform for Line 7 towards Wushan Square and Line 9 terminus

General information
- Location: Shangcheng District, Hangzhou, Zhejiang; China
- Coordinates: 30.2495°N 120.1969°E
- Operated by: Hangzhou Metro Corporation
- Lines: Line 7 Line 9
- Platforms: 4 (2 island platforms)

History
- Opened: 1 April 2022

Services
Preceding station	Hangzhou Metro	Following station
Moyetang towards Wushan Square	Line 7	Citizen Center towards Jiangdong'er Road
Terminus	Line 9	Xinye Road towards Long'an
Location

Guanyintang (Chinese: 观音塘) is a metro station of Line 7 and Line 9 of the Hangzhou Metro in China. It is located in Shangcheng District of Hangzhou. The station was opened on 1 April 2022.

== Design ==
The station's interior design incorporates the concept of "latitude and longitude" interwoven, using these weaving elements as a symbolic link to the city's emotions. This design weaves a unique memory of the city within the space.

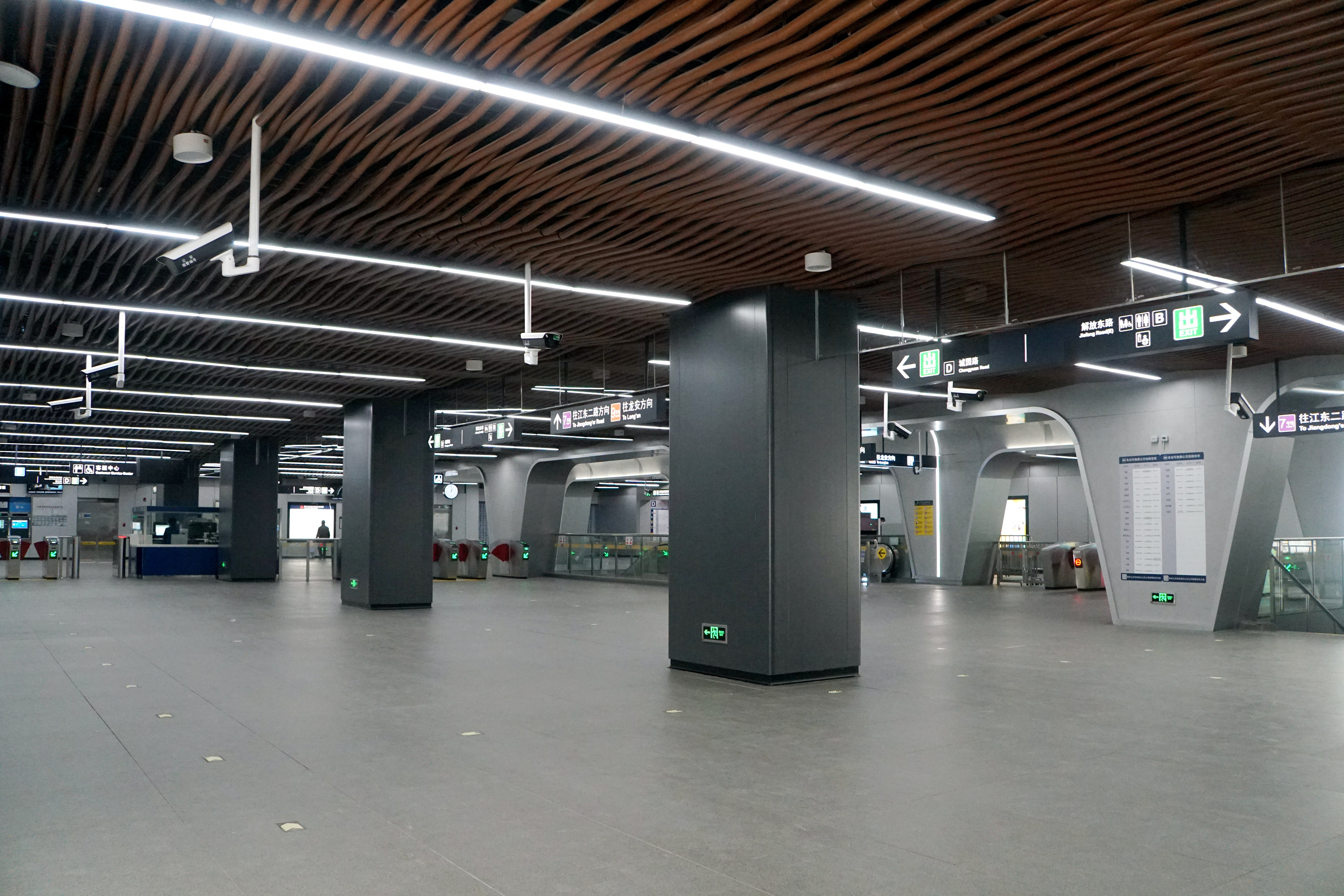
Concourse
