= Fuxing Road station =

Fuxing Road station may refer to:

- Fuxing Road station (Hangzhou Metro), a station on the Hangzhou Metro in Zhejiang
- Fuxing Road station (Wuhan Metro), a station on the Wuhan Metro in Hubei
- Fuxinglu station, a station on line 6 of the Tianjin Metro
