= Jiumu Road station =

Metro station in Hangzhou, China

Jiumu Road 九睦路
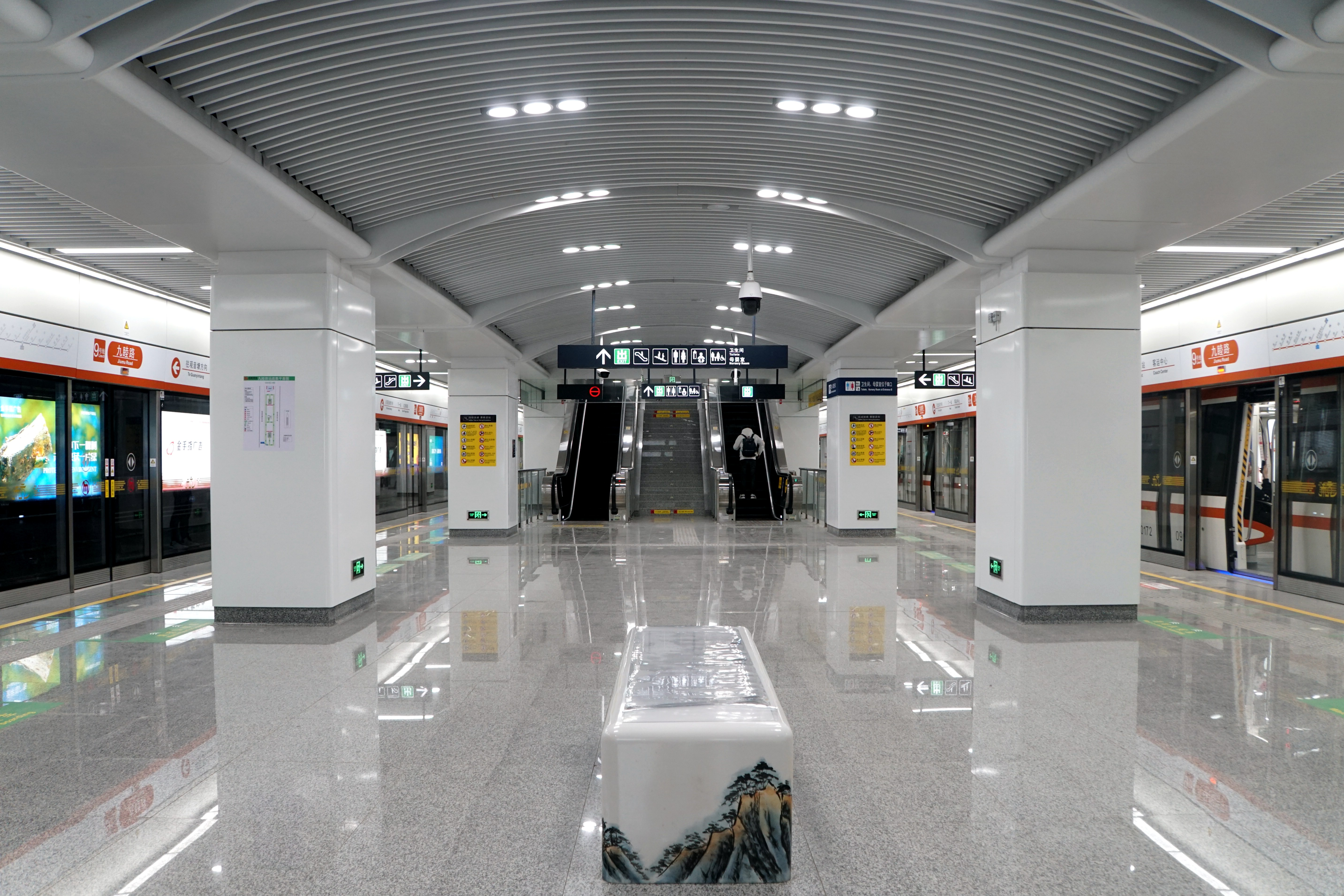
- Platforms

General information
- Location: Jiumu Road; Shangcheng District, Hangzhou, Zhejiang; China
- Coordinates: 30°18′23″N 120°15′59″E
- System: Hangzhou metro station
- Operator: Hangzhou Metro Corporation
- Line: Line 9
- Platforms: 2 (1 island platform)

Construction
- Structure type: Underground
- Accessible: Yes

History
- Opened: 1 April 2022

Services
Preceding station	Hangzhou Metro	Following station
South Hongpu Road towards Guanyintang	Line 9	Coach Center towards Long'an
Location

Jiumu Road (Chinese: 九睦路) is a metro station of Line 9 of the Hangzhou Metro in China. It is located in Shangcheng District of Hangzhou. The station was opened on 1 April 2022.

== Station layout ==
Jiumu Road has two levels: a concourse, and an island platform with two tracks for line 9.

== Entrances/exits ==
- A: Donghuayuan Community
- B: west side of Jiumu Road, Xiasha Road
- C: Yinbao Street
