= Liubu Bridge =

Liubu Bridge 六部桥
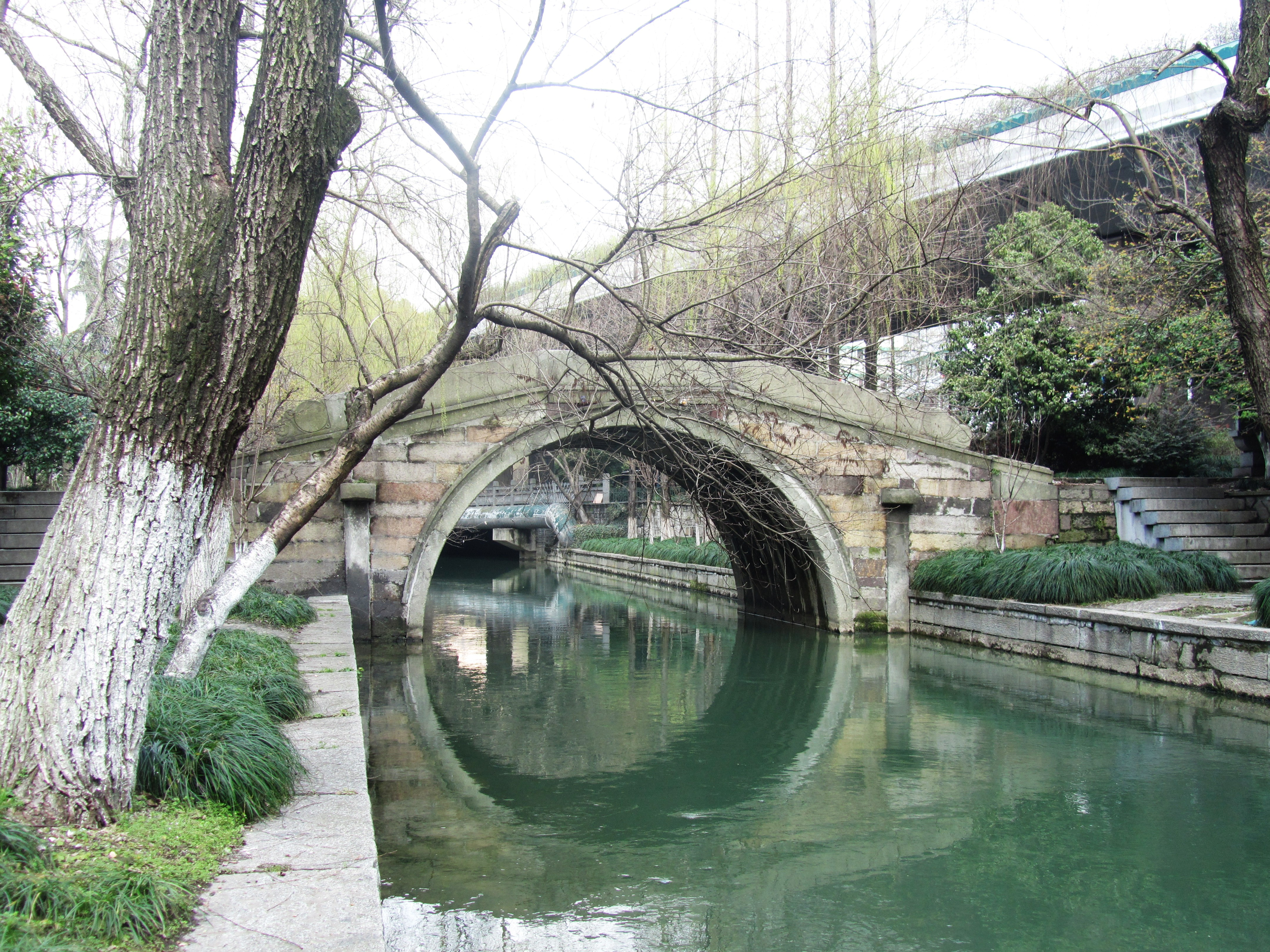
- Liubu Bridge in March 2014
- Coordinates: 30°14′00″N 120°10′37″E
- Carries: Pedestrians
- Crosses: Zhong River
- Locale: Ziyang Subdistrict, Shangcheng District of Hangzhou, Zhejiang, China

Characteristics
- Design: Arch bridge
- Material: Stone
- Total length: 15 metres (49 ft)
- Width: 5 metres (16 ft)

History
- Rebuilt: 1984

The Liubu Bridge (simplified Chinese: 六部桥; traditional Chinese: 六部橋; pinyin: Liùbù Qiáo) is a historic stone arch bridge over the Zhong River in Ziyang Subdistrict, Shangcheng District of Hangzhou, Zhejiang, China. The bridge is 15 metres (49 ft) long and 5 metres (16 ft) wide.

== Etymology ==
Liubu Bridge is named after the fact that its west was facing the twenty-four court offices of the Six Ministries, and its east was Duting Posthouse, so it was also called Duting Posthouse Bridge (都亭驿桥) during the Southern Song dynasty.

== History ==
The original temple dates back to the Southern Song dynasty (1127–1279). It historically known as Tonghui Bridge (通惠桥) in the Yuan dynasty (1271–1368), Jinyun Bridge (锦云桥) in the Ming dynasty (1368–1644), and reverted to its former name of Liubu Bridge in the Qing dynasty (1644–1911). The current bridge was rebuilt in 1984. In July 2000, it has been designated as a municipal-level cultural heritage site by the Government of Hangzhou.

== Gallery ==
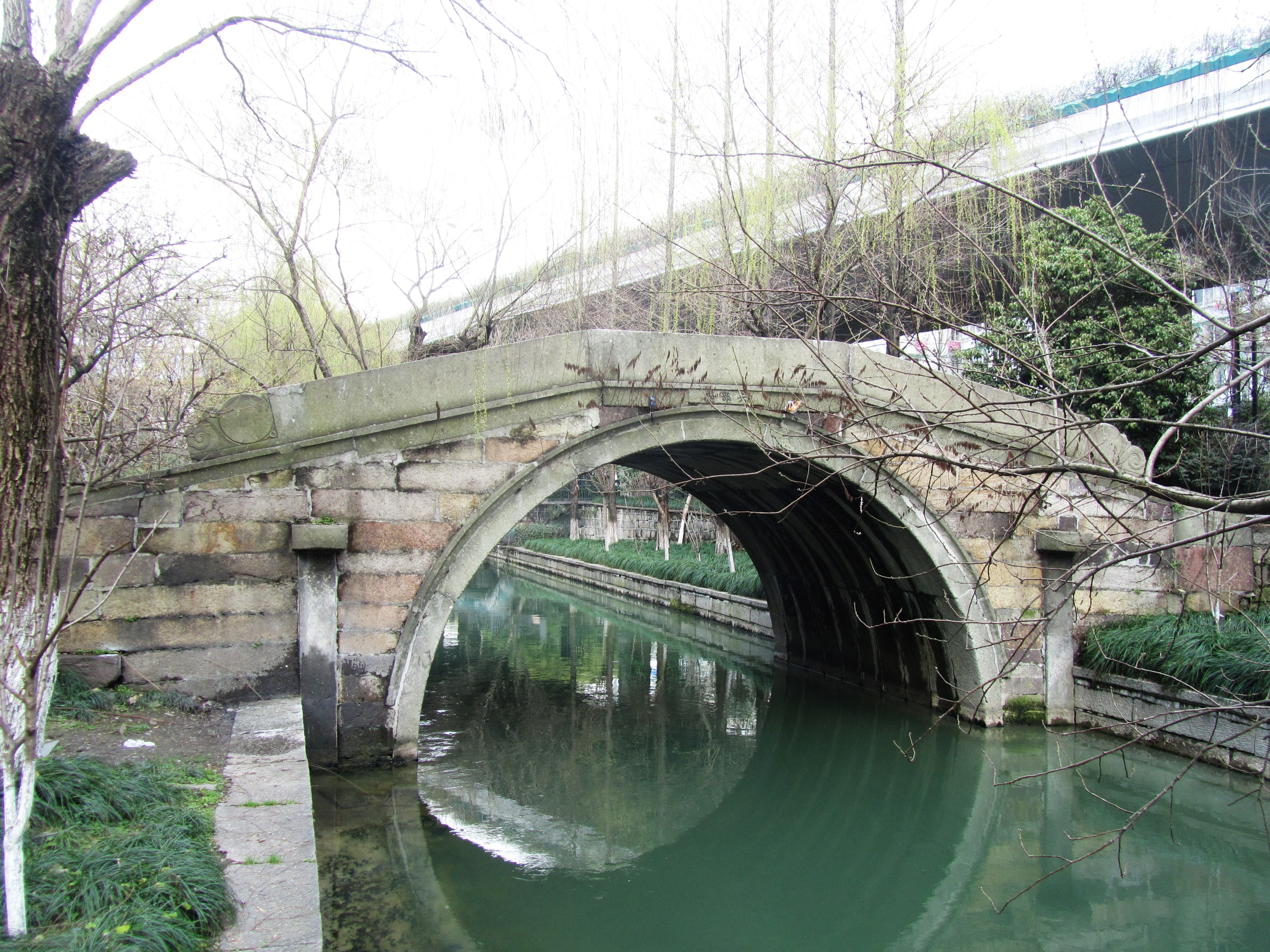
Liubu Bridge in March 2014

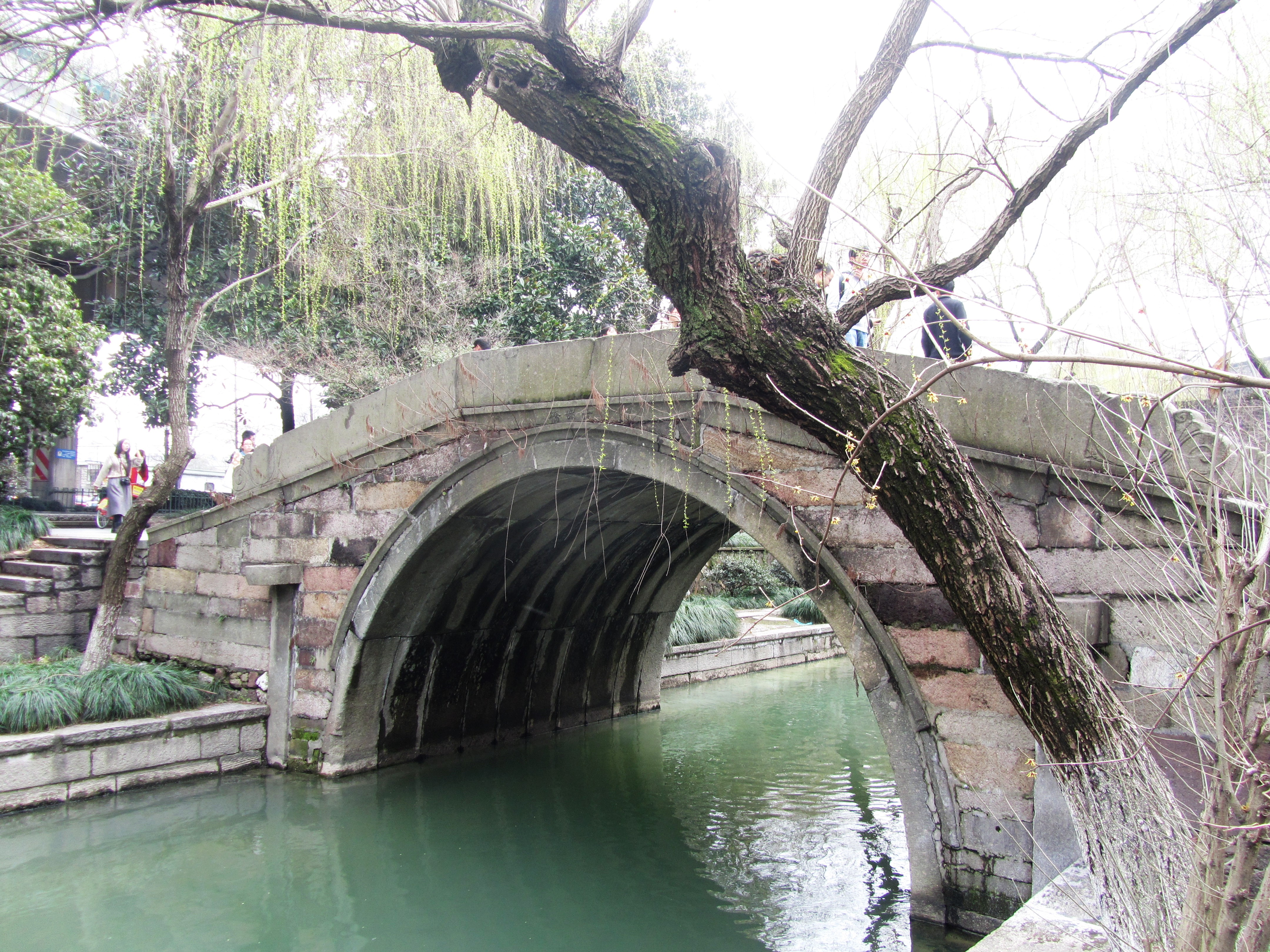
Liubu Bridge in March 2014

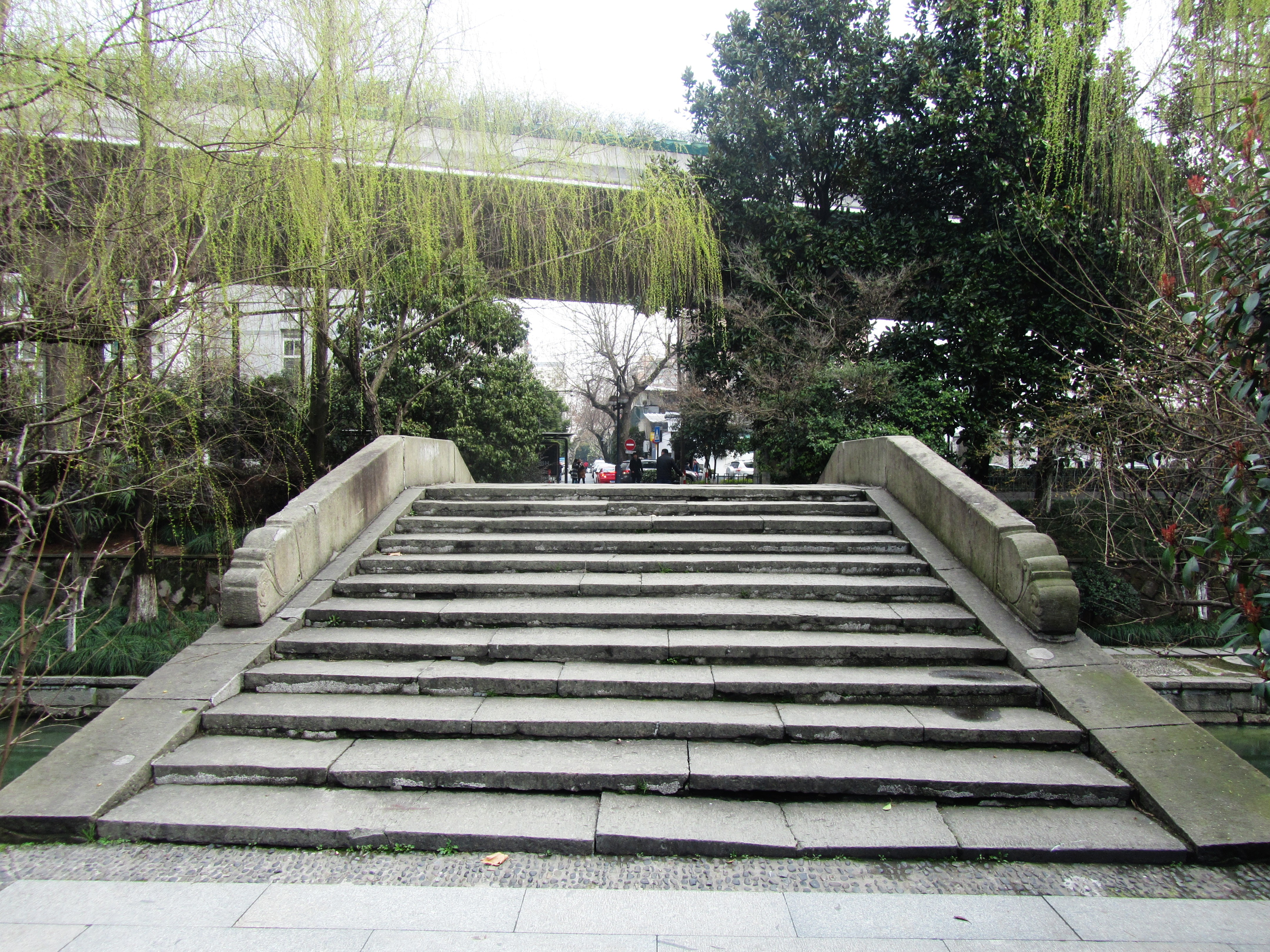
Liubu Bridge in March 2014

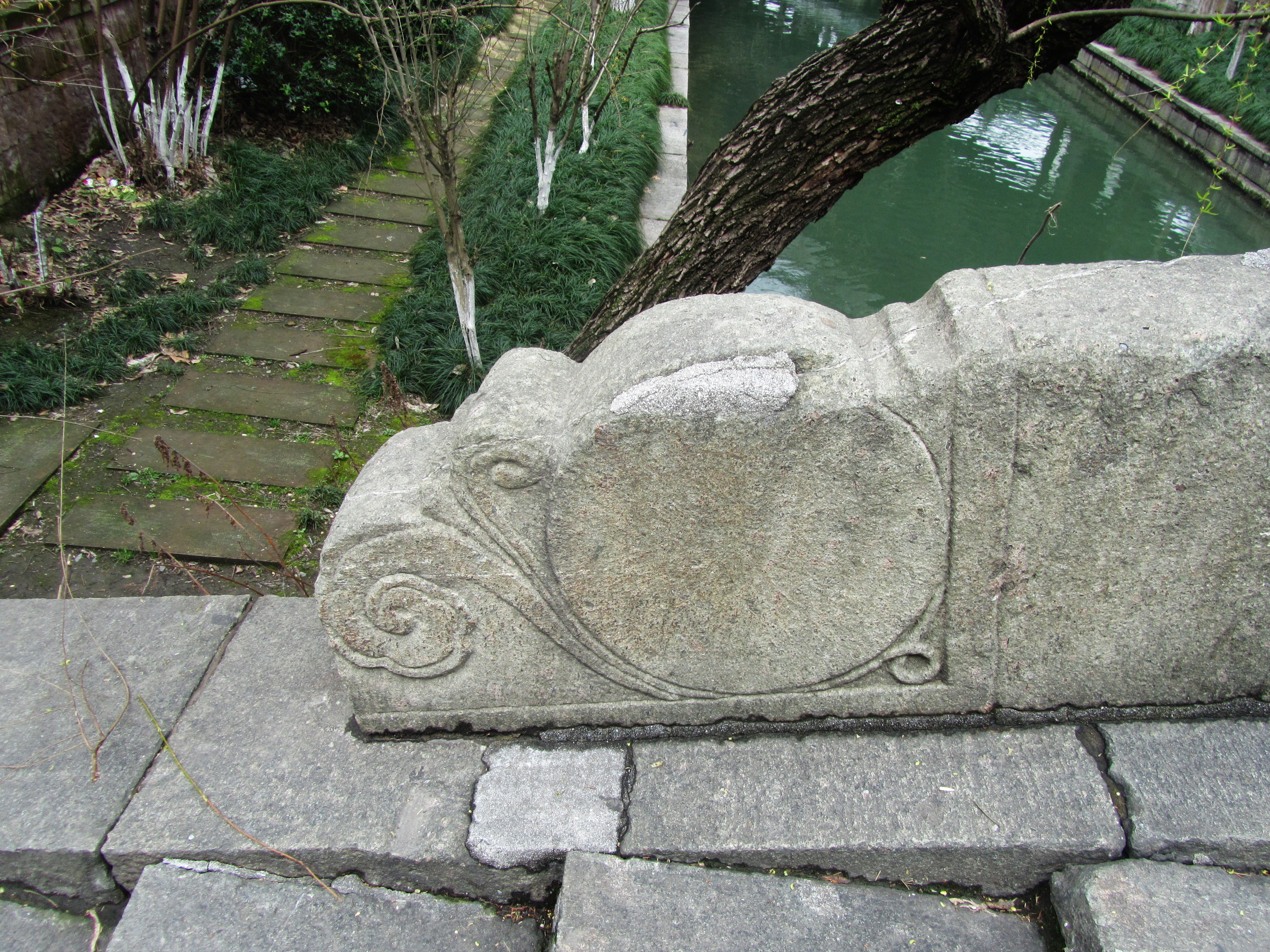
Drum-shaped bearing stone

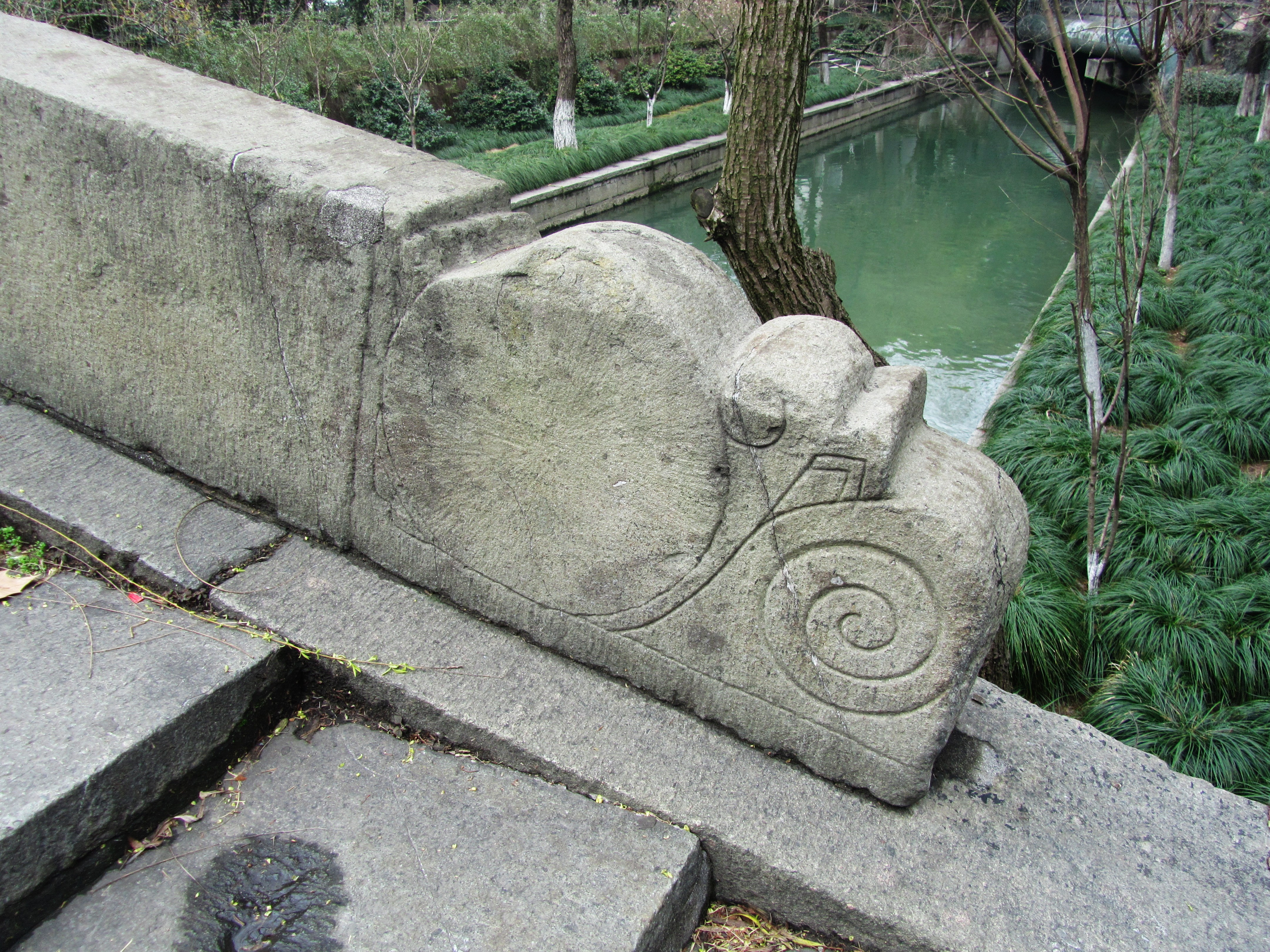
Drum-shaped bearing stone

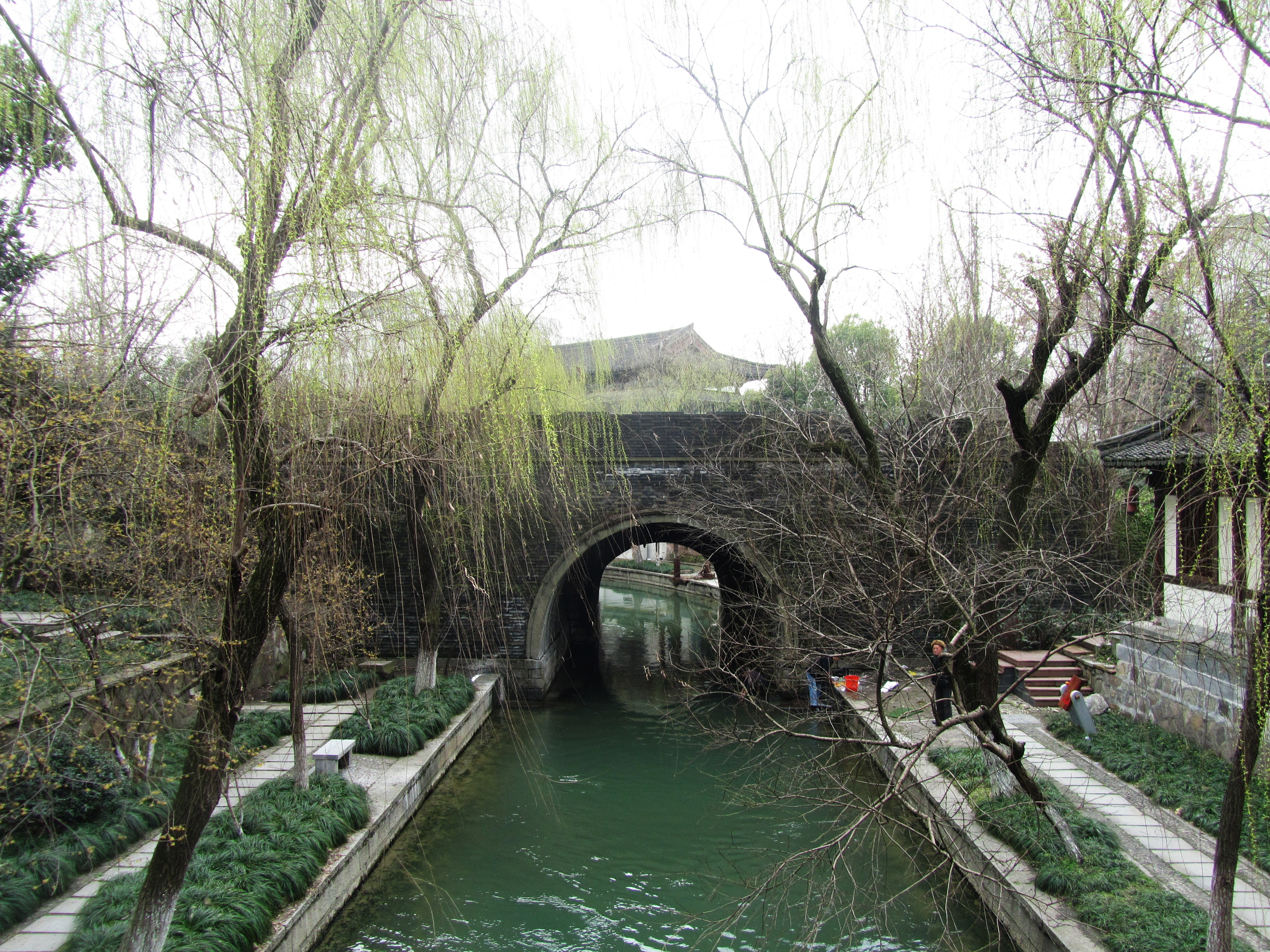
