= Xinfeng station =

Metro station in Hangzhou, China

Xinfeng 新风
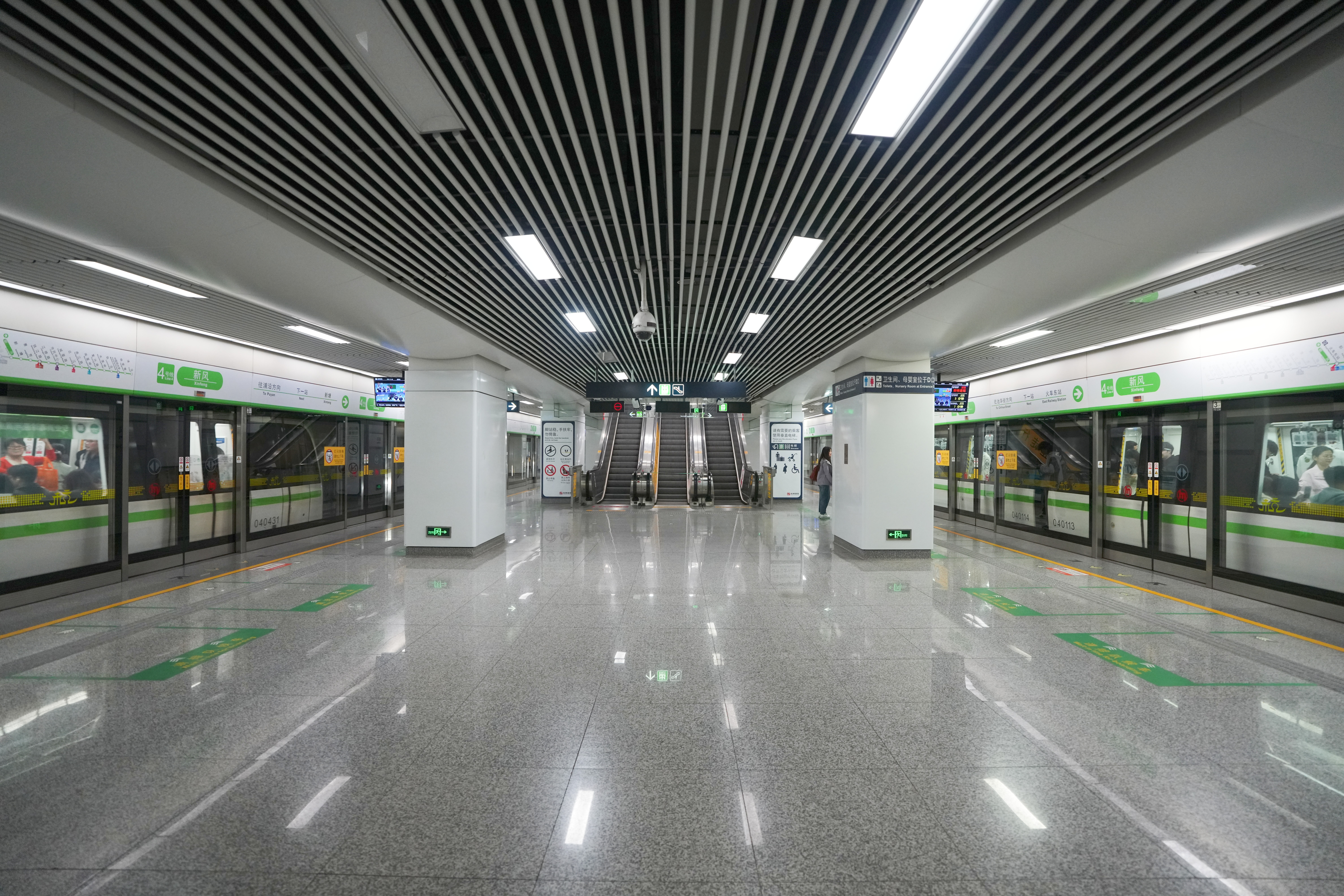
- Platforms

General information
- Location: Huanzhan Road (S); Shangcheng District, Hangzhou, Zhejiang; China
- Coordinates: 30°17′22″N 120°12′12″E
- System: Hangzhou metro station
- Operator: Hangzhou Metro Corporation
- Line: Line 4
- Platforms: 2 (1 island platform)

Construction
- Structure type: Underground
- Accessible: Yes

History
- Opened: February 2, 2015

Services
Preceding station	Hangzhou Metro	Following station
Xintang towards Puyan	Line 4	East Railway Station towards Chihua Street
Location

Xinfeng (simplified Chinese: 新风; traditional Chinese: 新風) is a metro station on Line 4 of the Hangzhou Metro in China. It is located in the Shangcheng District of Hangzhou.

== Station layout ==
Xinfeng has four levels: basement 1 is a concourse, and basement 4 is an island platform with two tracks for Line 4. Before East Railway Station (East Square) station of Line 6 opened, it was the only station has four floors and also the deepest station in Hangzhou Metro.

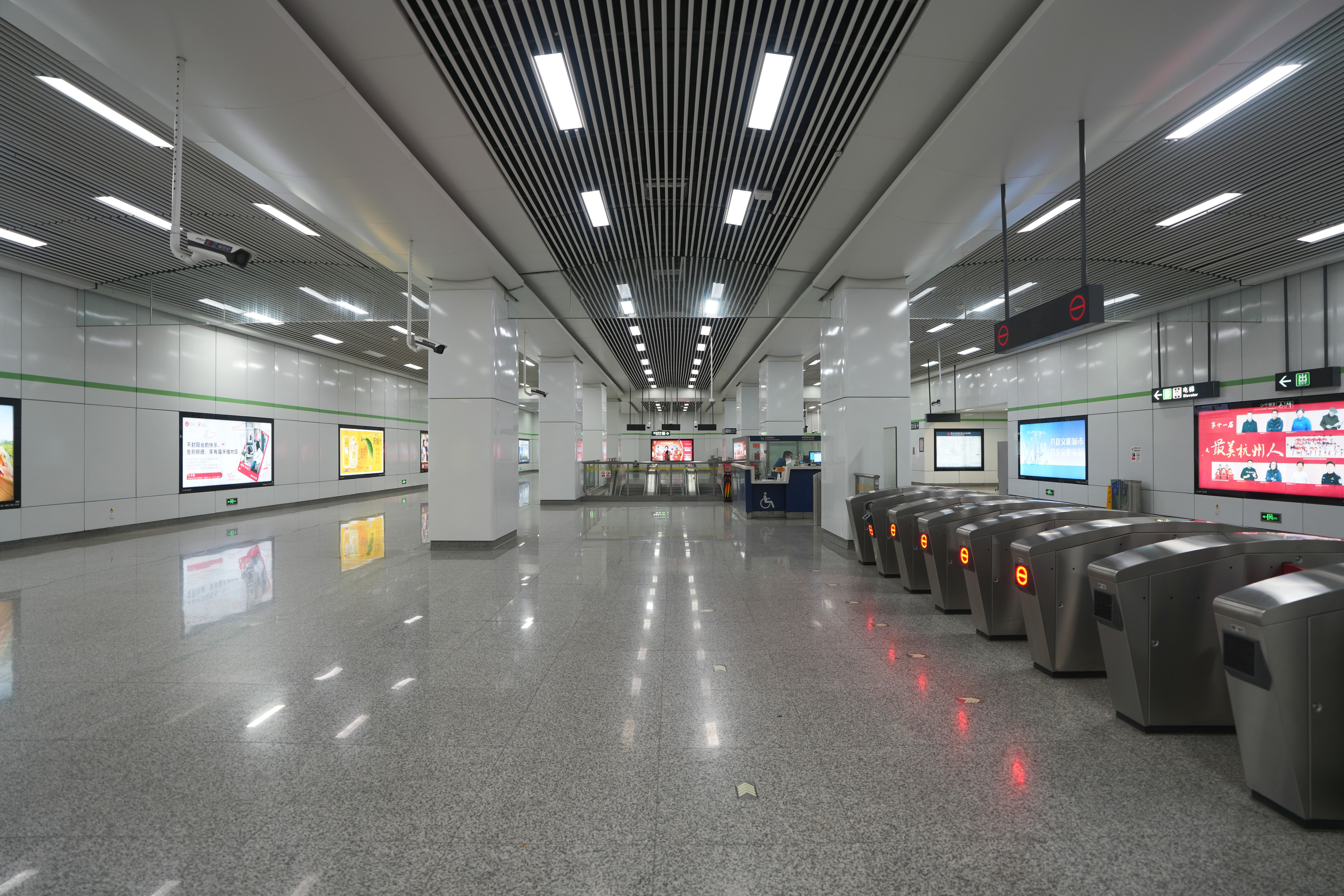
Concourse

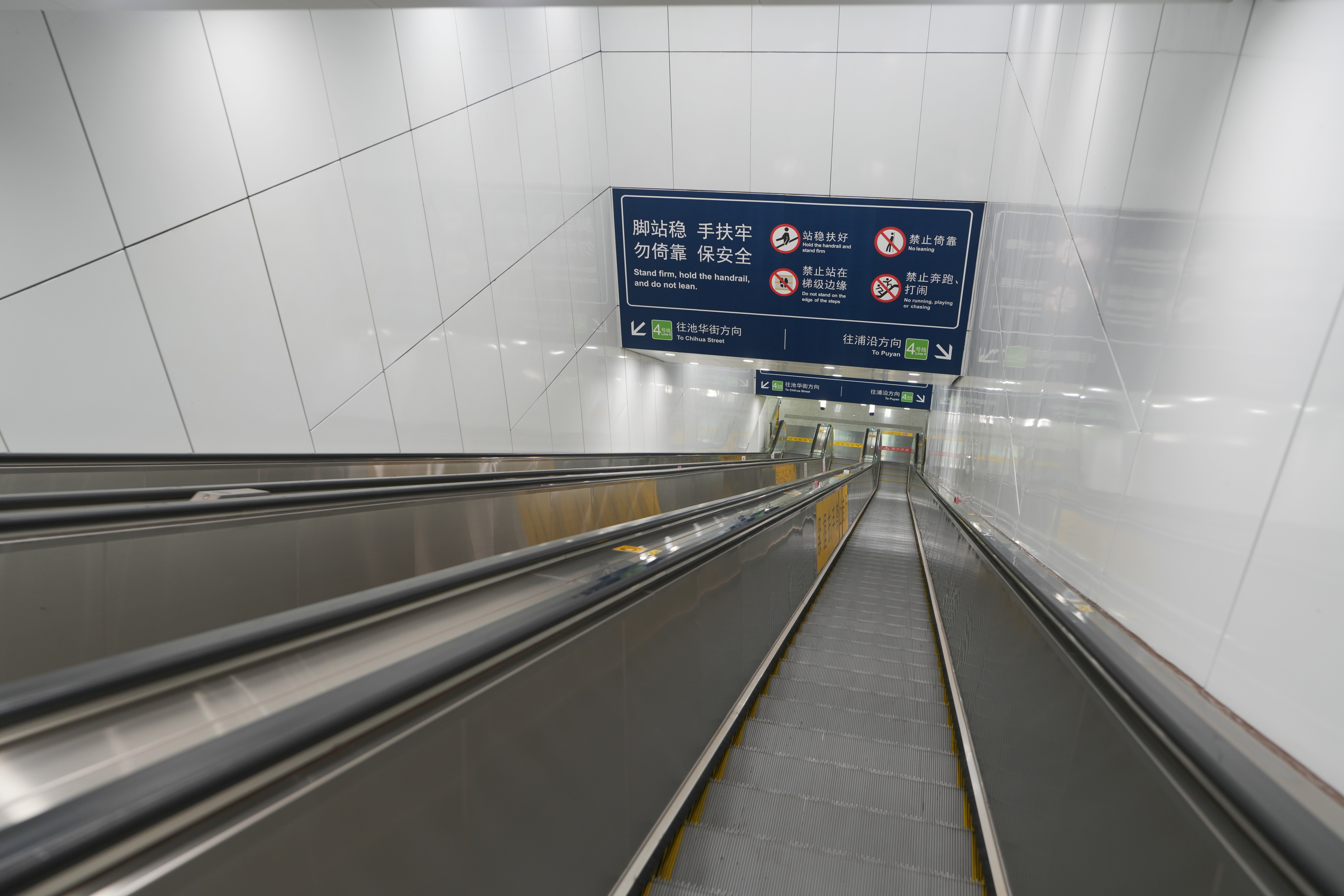
Escalators connect concourse and platform

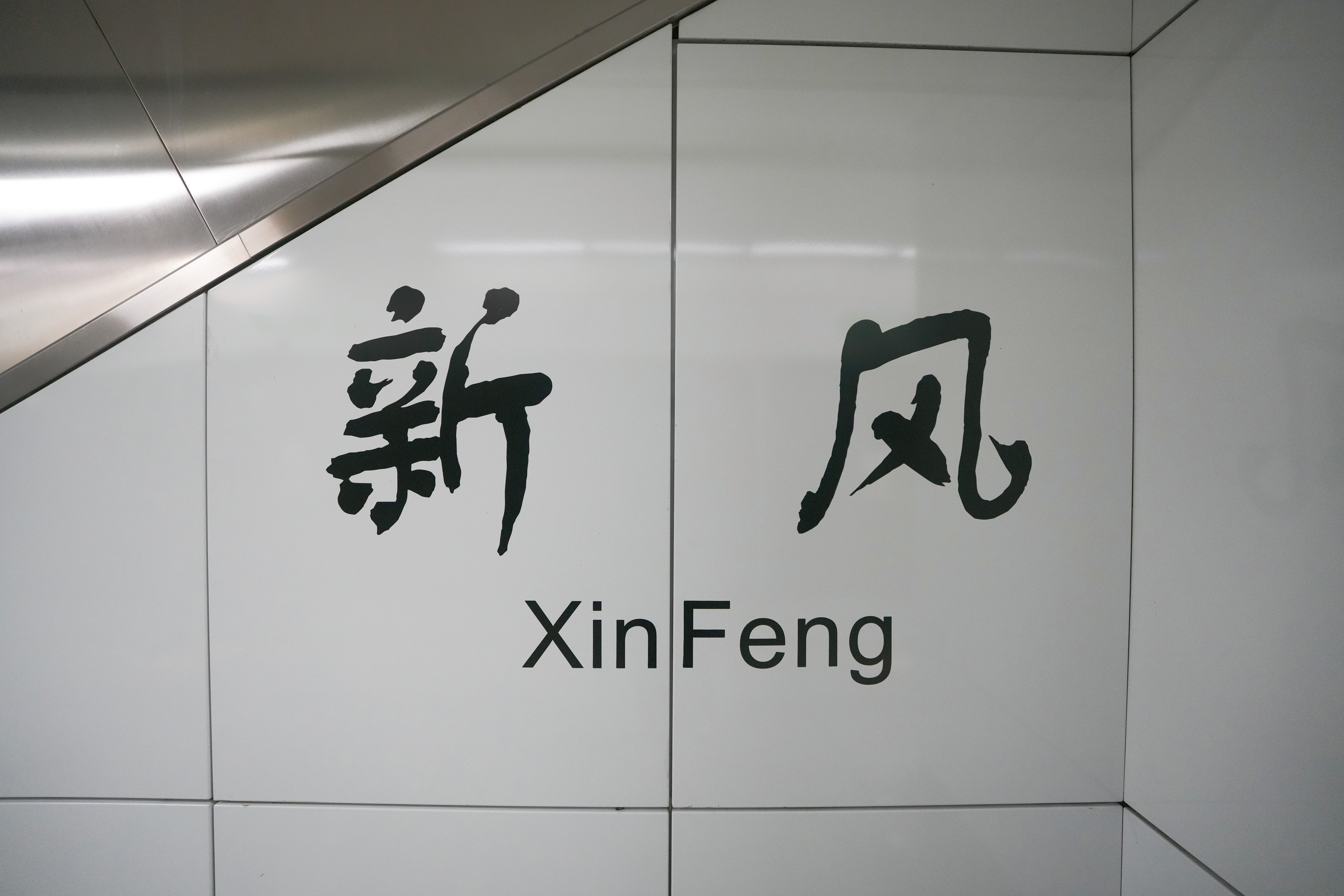
Station name in Chinese calligraphy

== Entrances/exits ==
Only one entrance is accessible now.

- C: Huanzhan Road (S), Tiancheng Road
