= Nanxingqiao station =

Metro station in China

Nanxingqiao 南星桥
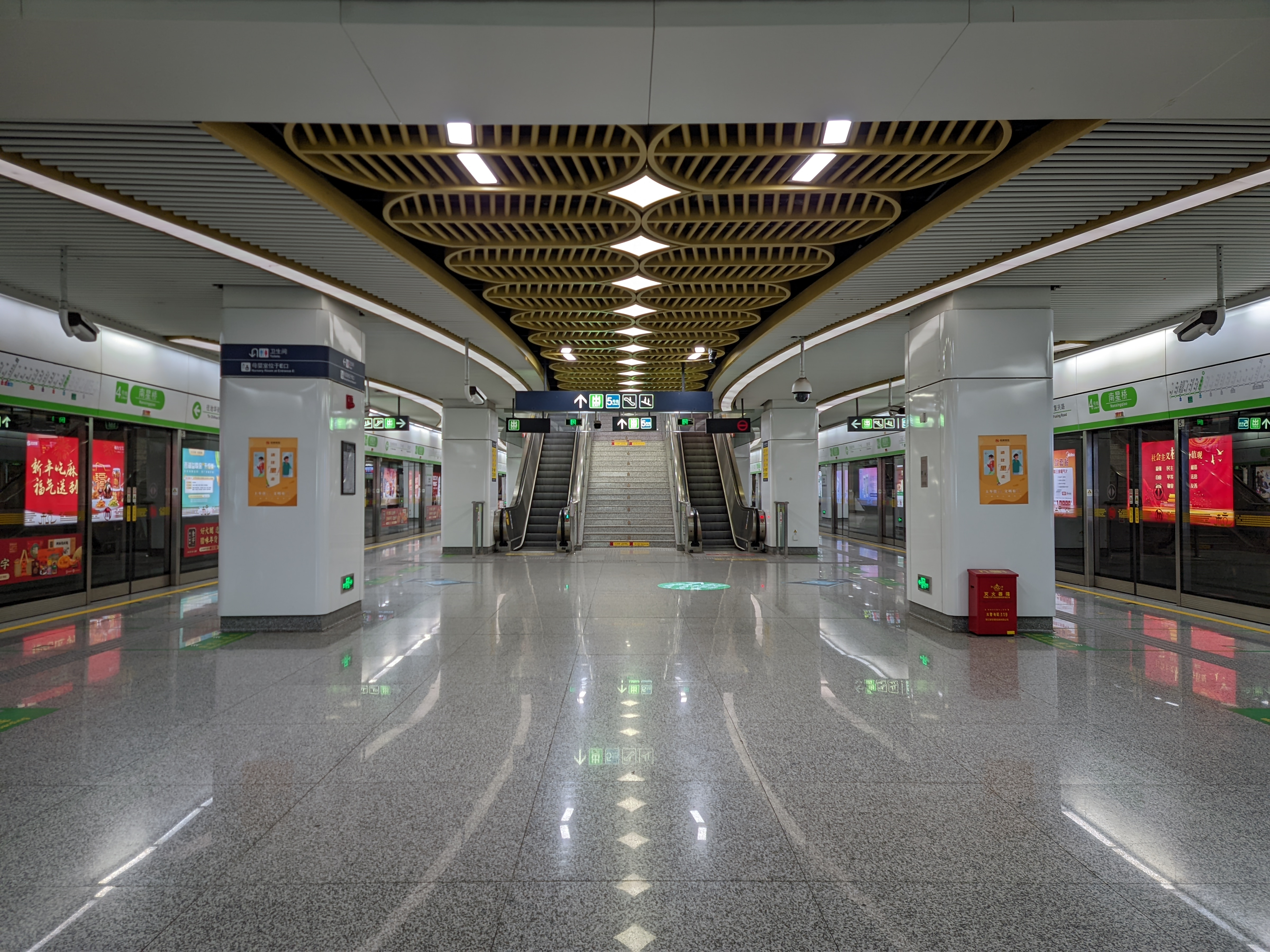
- Platform of Line 4

General information
- Location: Qianjiang Road × Feiyunjiang Road; Shangcheng District, Hangzhou, Zhejiang; China
- Coordinates: 30.2197°N 120.1728°E
- Operated by: Hangzhou Metro Corporation (Line 4); Hangzhou MTR Line 5 Corporation Limited (Line 5)
- Line(s): Line 4 Line 5
- Platforms: 4 (2 island platforms)

History
- Opened: January 9, 2018 (Line 4); April 23, 2020 (Line 5)

Services
| Preceding station | Hangzhou Metro | Following station |
|---|---|---|
| Fuxing Road towards Puyan | Line 4 | Yongjiang Road towards Chihua Street |
| Houchaomen towards East Nanhu | Line 5 | Changhe towards Guniangqiao |

Nanxingqiao (Chinese: 南星桥) is a metro station on Line 4 and Line 5 of the Hangzhou Metro in China. It is located in the Shangcheng District of Hangzhou.

== Station layout ==
Nanxingqiao has three levels: a concourse, and separate levels for lines 4 and 5. Each of these consists of an island platform with two tracks.

== Entrances/exits ==
- A: north side of Qianjiang Road, Yaojiang Road
- B: north side of Qianjiang Road, Feiyunjiang Road
- C: south side of Qianjiang Road, Feiyunjiang Road
- D: south side of Qianjiang Road, Feiyunjiang Road
- E: south side of Qianjiang Road, Yaojiang Road

== Gallery ==
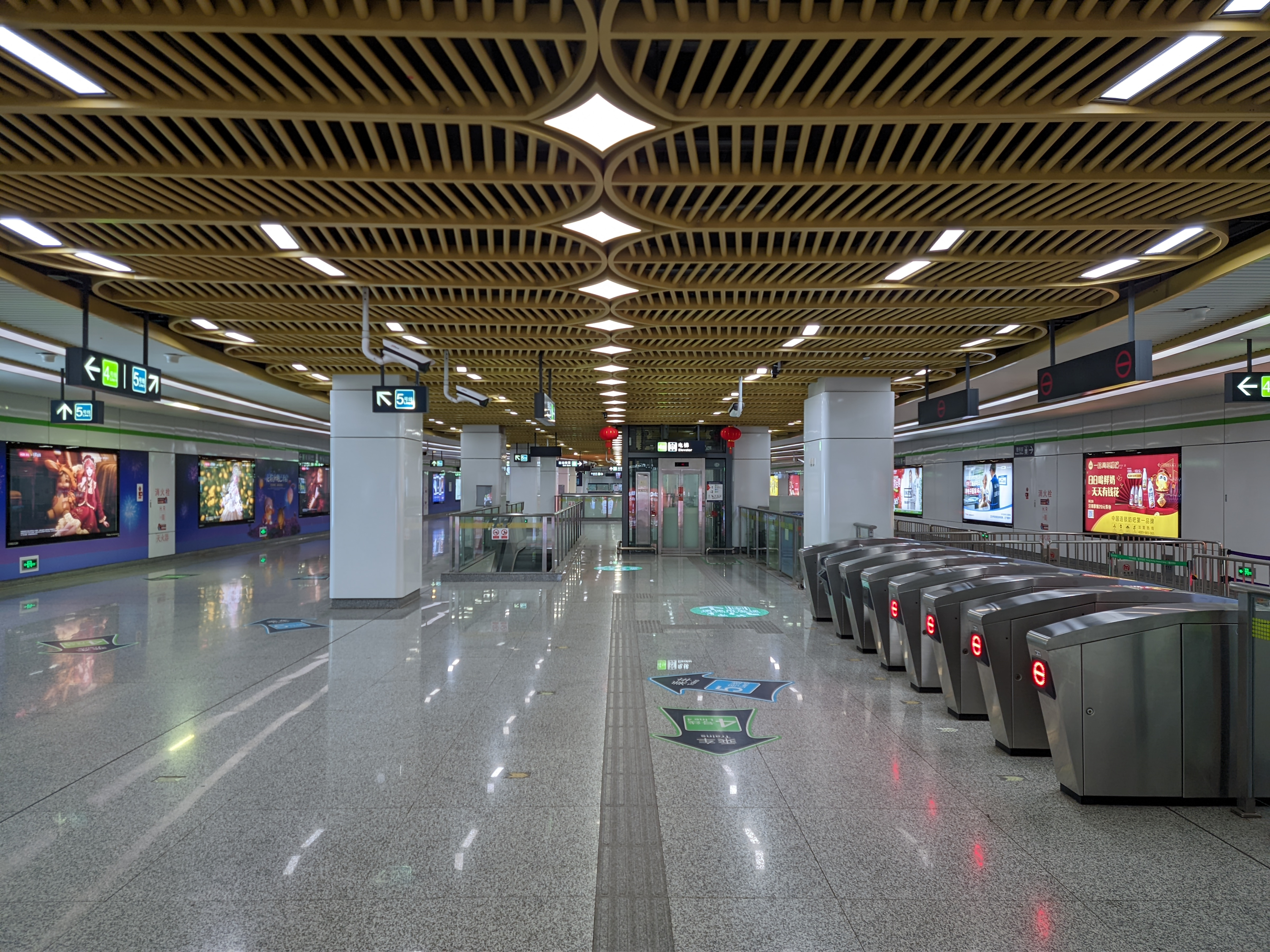
Concourse

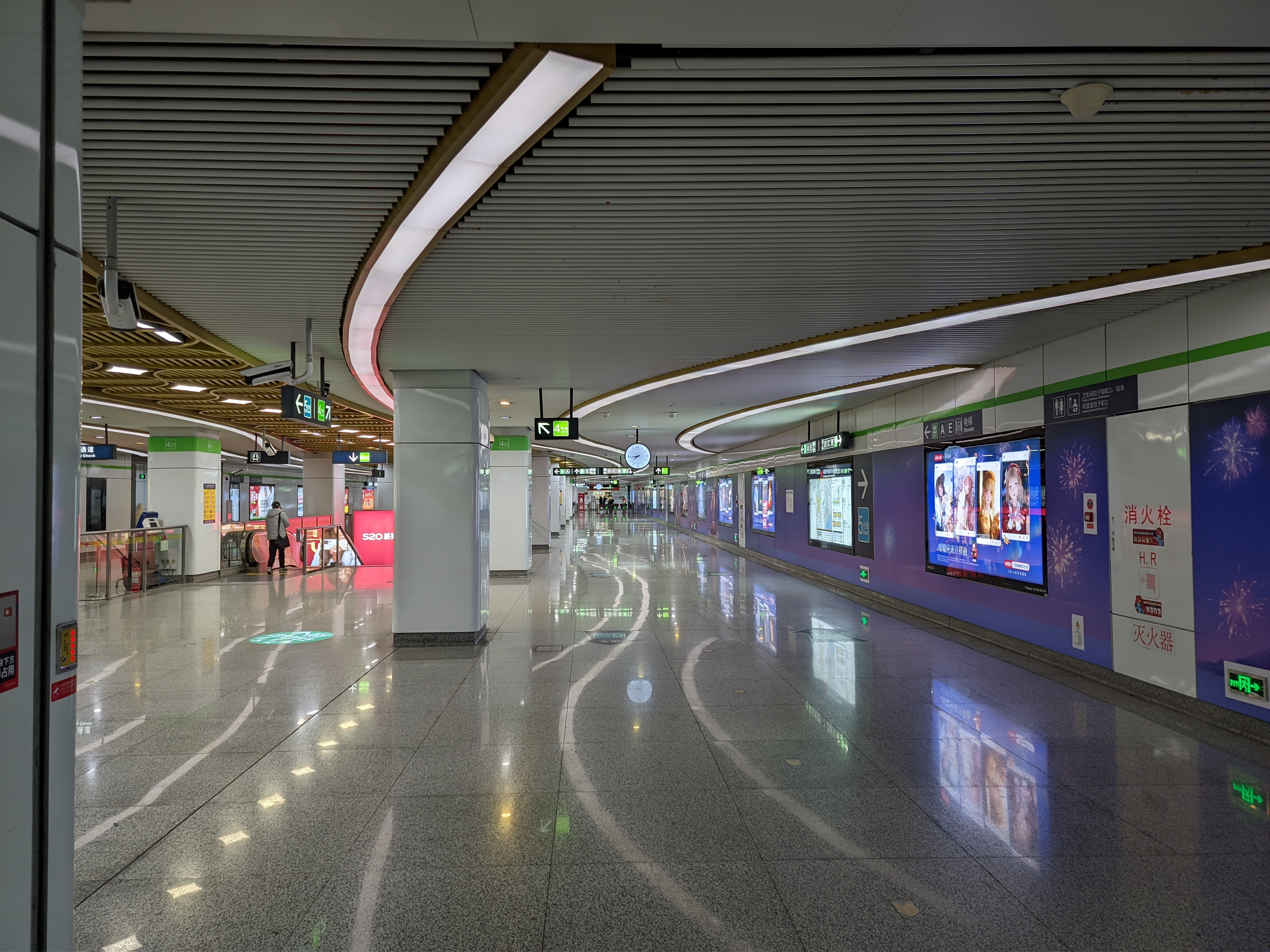
Concourse

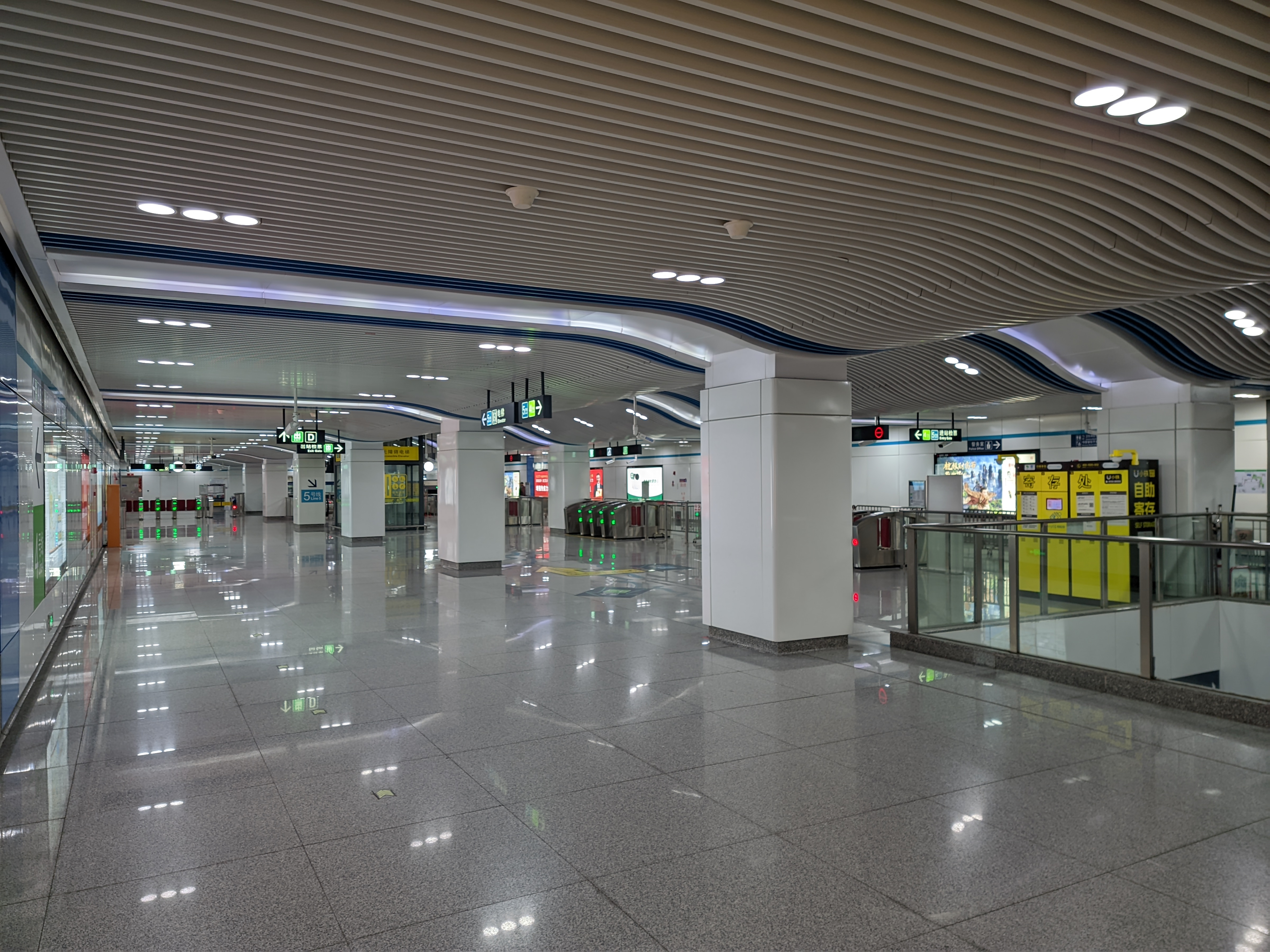
Concourse

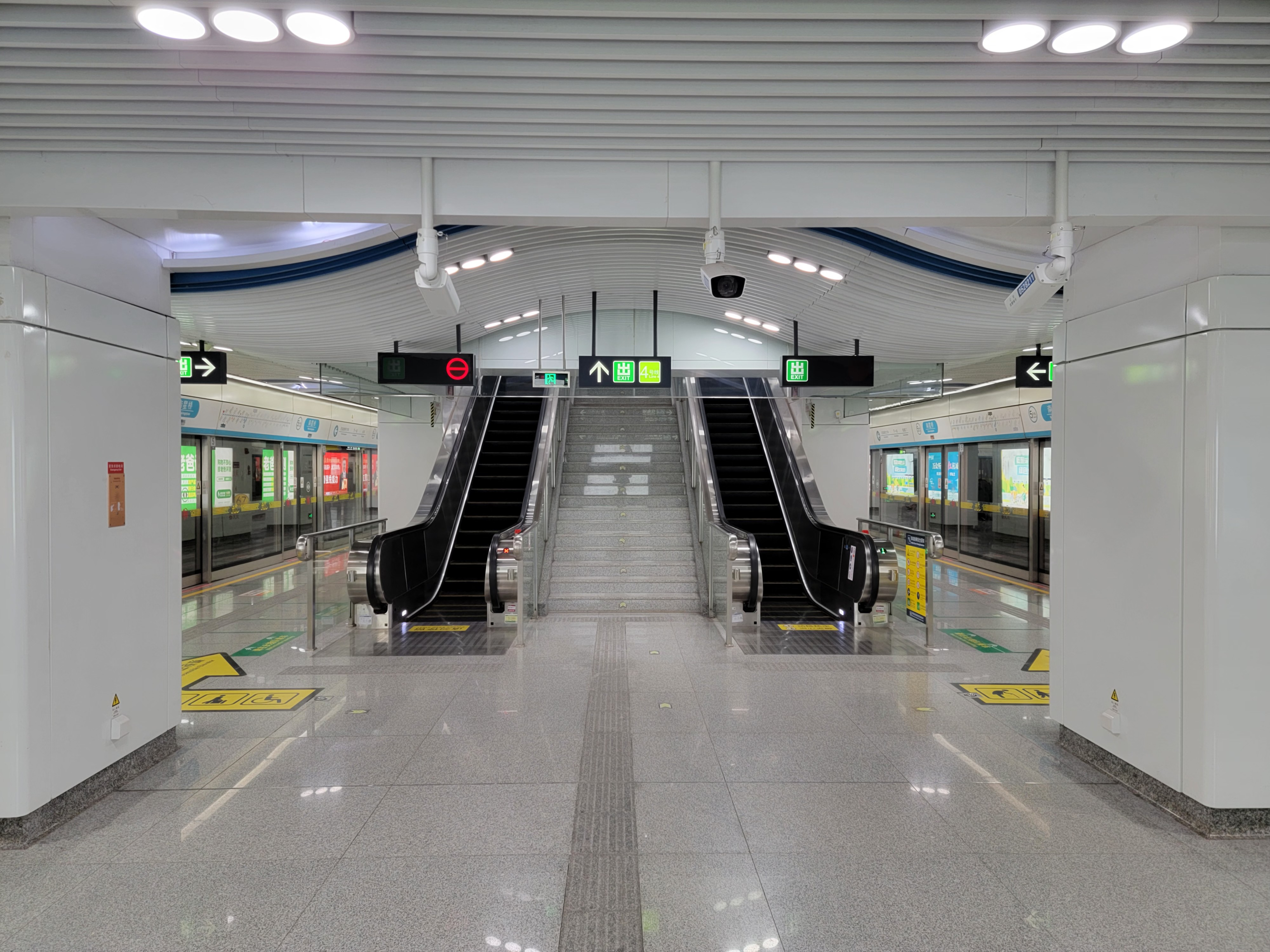
Line 5 platform
