= Ziyang Subdistrict, Hangzhou =

Ziyang Subdistrict 紫阳街道
- Subdistrict
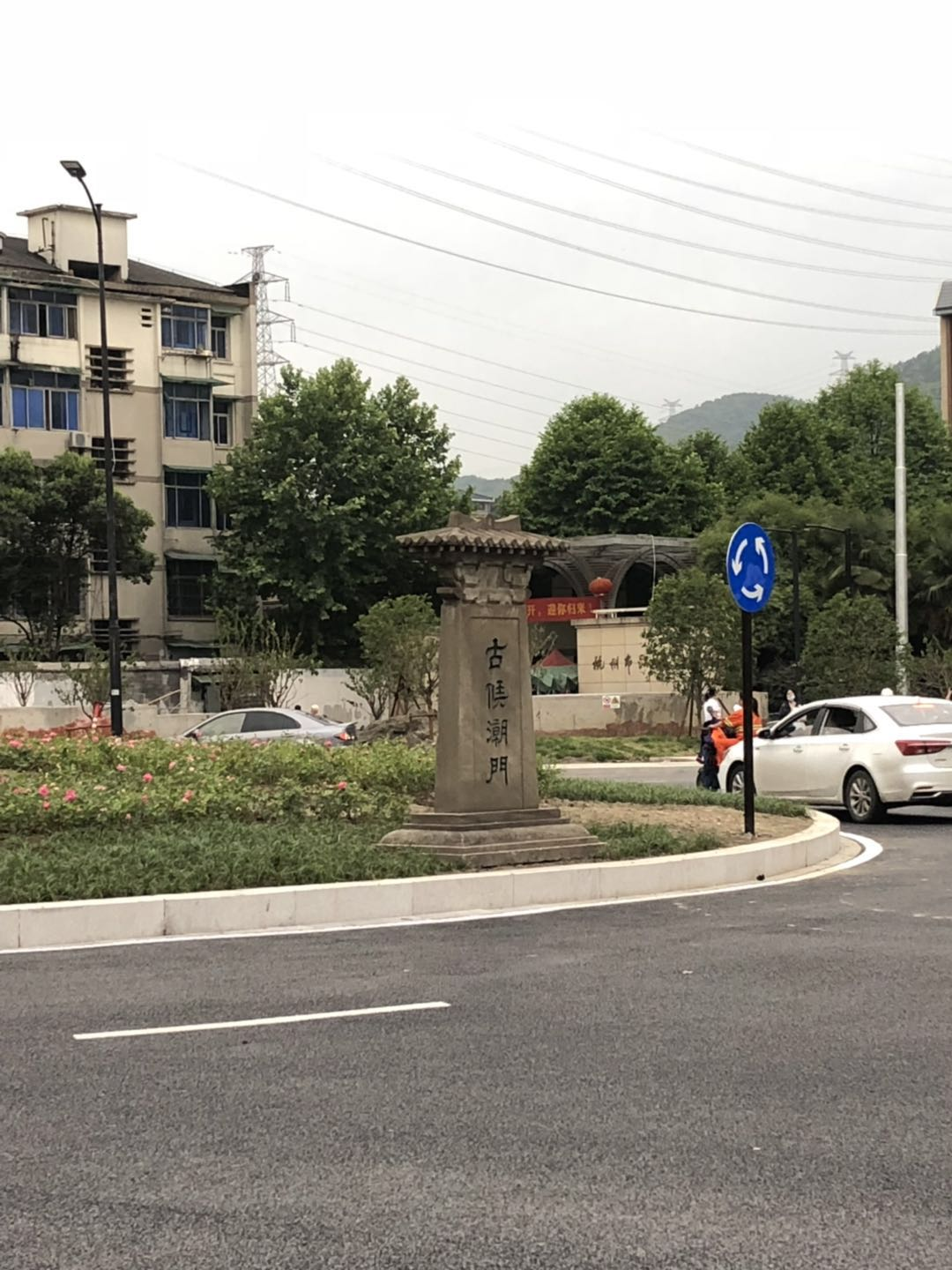
- Ancient Houchao Gate

- Location in Zhejiang
- Coordinates: 30°14′04″N 120°09′56″E
- Country: People's Republic of China
- Province: Zhejiang
- Prefecture-level city: Hangzhou
- District: Shangcheng District

Area
  - Total: 4.49 km^{2} (1.73 sq mi)

Population (2017)
  - Total: 74,900
  - Density: 16,700/km^{2} (43,200/sq mi)
- Time zone: UTC+08:00 (China Standard)
- Postal code: 310008
- Area code: 0571

Ziyang Subdistrict (simplified Chinese: 紫阳街道; traditional Chinese: 紫陽街道; pinyin: Zǐyáng Jiēdào) is a subdistrict in Shangcheng District of Hangzhou, Zhejiang, China. As of the 2017 census it had a population of 74,900 and an area of 4.49-square-kilometre (1.73 sq mi).

== Etymology ==
Ziyang Subdistrict is named after Ziyang Mountain, a branch range of Wu Mountain.

== Administrative division ==
As of 2020, the subdistrict is divided into twelve communities:

- Shiwukui Lane Community (十五奎巷社区)
- North Luomaying Community (北落马营社区)
- Rosy Clouds Ridge Community (彩霞岭社区)
- Houchao Gate Community (候潮门社区)
- Royal Ancestral Temple Community (太庙社区)
- Muchang Lane Community (木场巷社区)
- Xingong Community (新工社区)
- phoenix Community (凤凰社区)
- Sea Tide Community (海潮社区)
- Shangyangshijie Community (上羊市街社区)
- Spring River Community (春江社区)
- Yongjiang Community (甬江社区)

== Tourist attractions ==
Liubu Bridge is a historic stone arch bridge in the subdistrict.
