= Shouyi Road station =

Metro station in Wuhan, China

Shouyi Road 首义路 metro
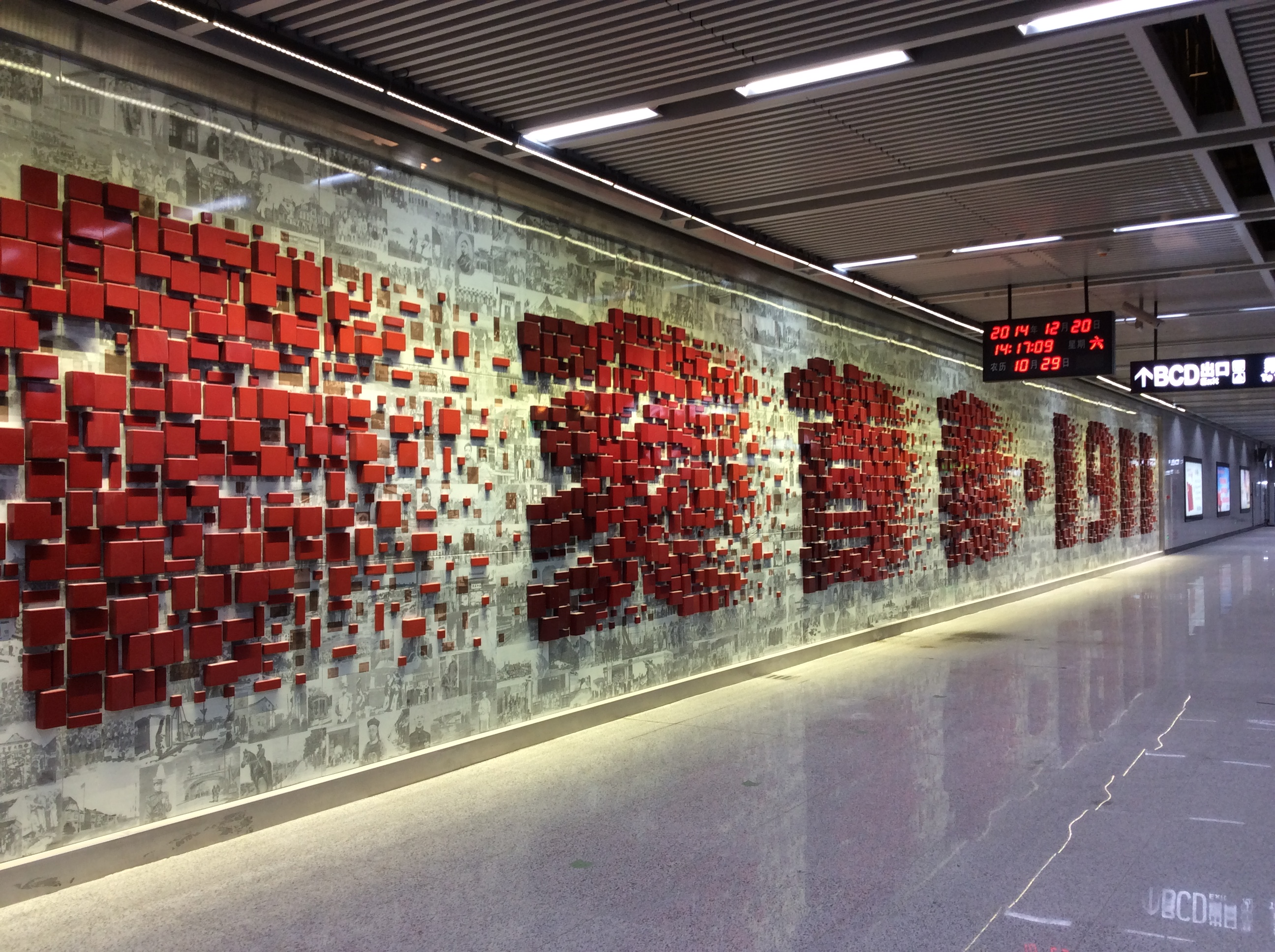
- Cultural Wall of Shouyi Road Station

General information
- Location: Wuchang District, Wuhan, Hubei; China
- Operator: Wuhan Metro Co., Ltd
- Line: Line 4
- Platforms: 2 (1 island platform, 1 side platform)

Construction
- Structure type: Underground

History
- Opened: December 28, 2014

Services
Preceding station	Wuhan Metro	Following station
Fuxing Road towards Bailin	Line 4	Wuchang Railway Station towards Wuhan Railway Station
Location

Shouyi Road Station (Chinese: 首义路站) is a station of Line 4 of Wuhan Metro. It entered revenue service on December 28, 2014. It is located in Wuchang District.

== Station layout ==
G	Entrances and Exits	Exits A-E
B1	Concourse	Faregates, Station Agent
B2	Westbound	← Line 4 towards Bailin (Fuxing Road)
B2	Island platform, doors will open on the left
B2		Vehicle Storage Siding
B2	Eastbound	Line 4 towards Wuhan Railway Station (Wuchang Railway Station) →
B2	Side platform, doors will open on the right

== Around the station ==
- Qiyi Street Mosque

== Gallery ==
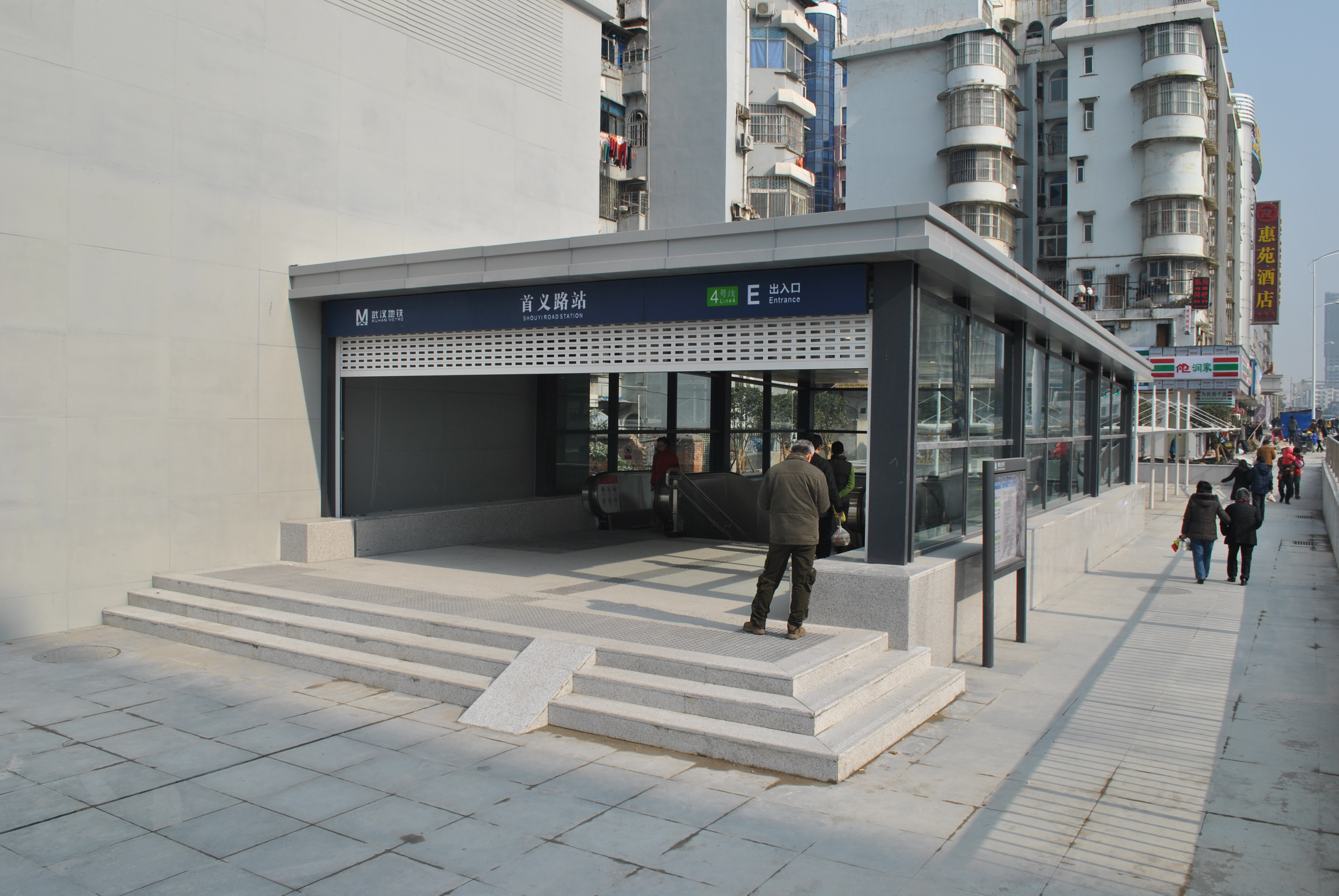
Entrance E

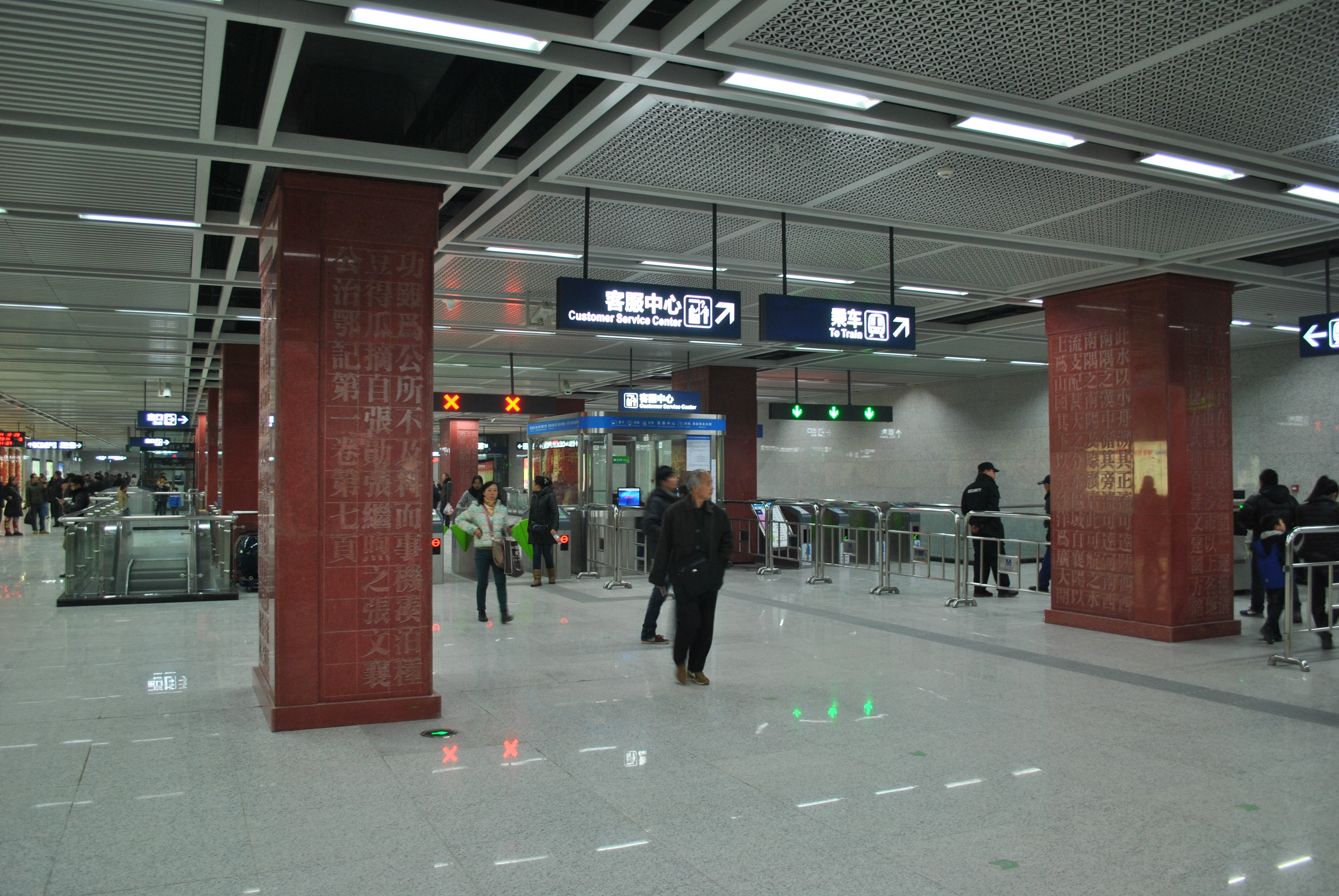
Concourse

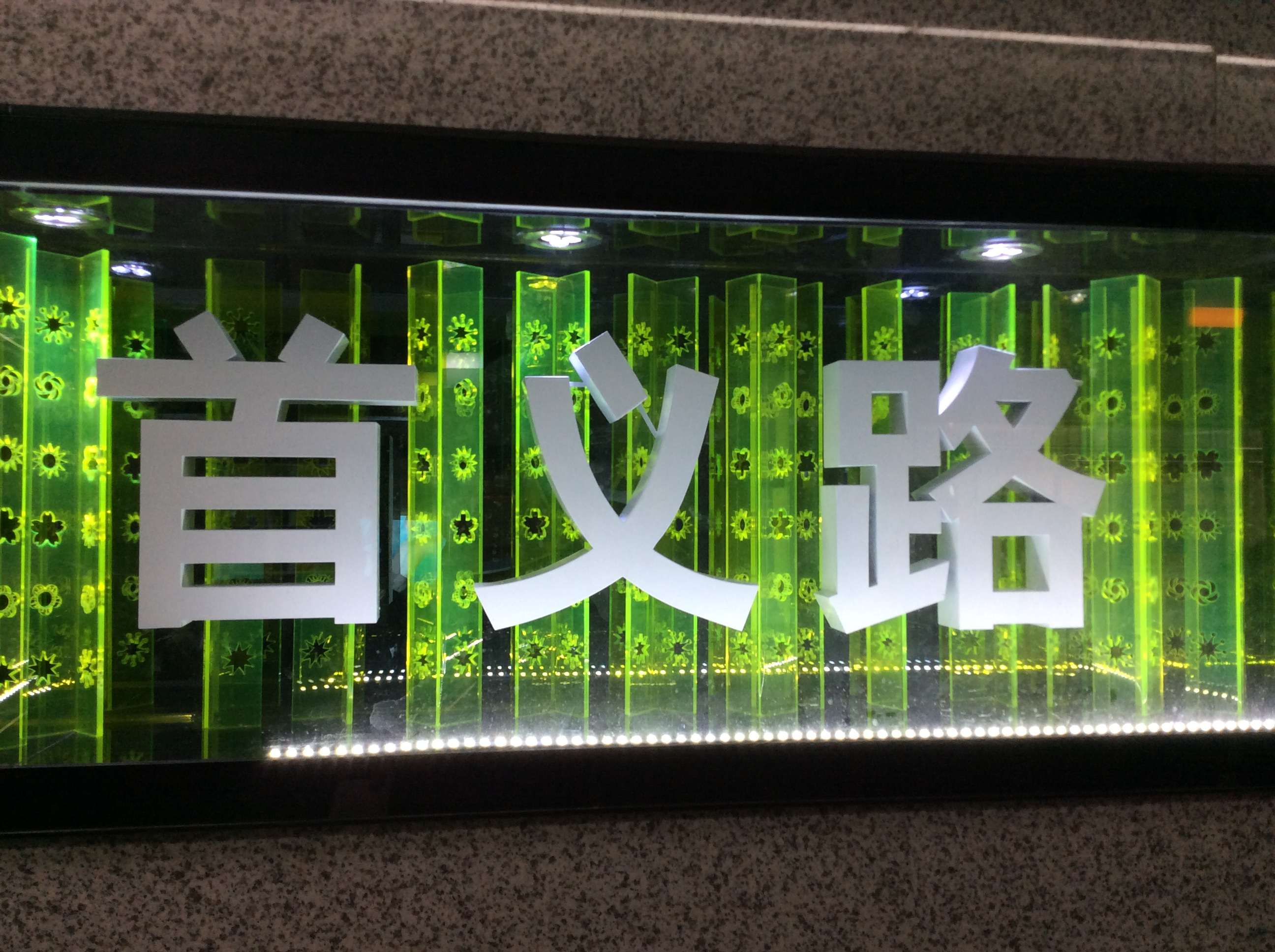
3D Station Name

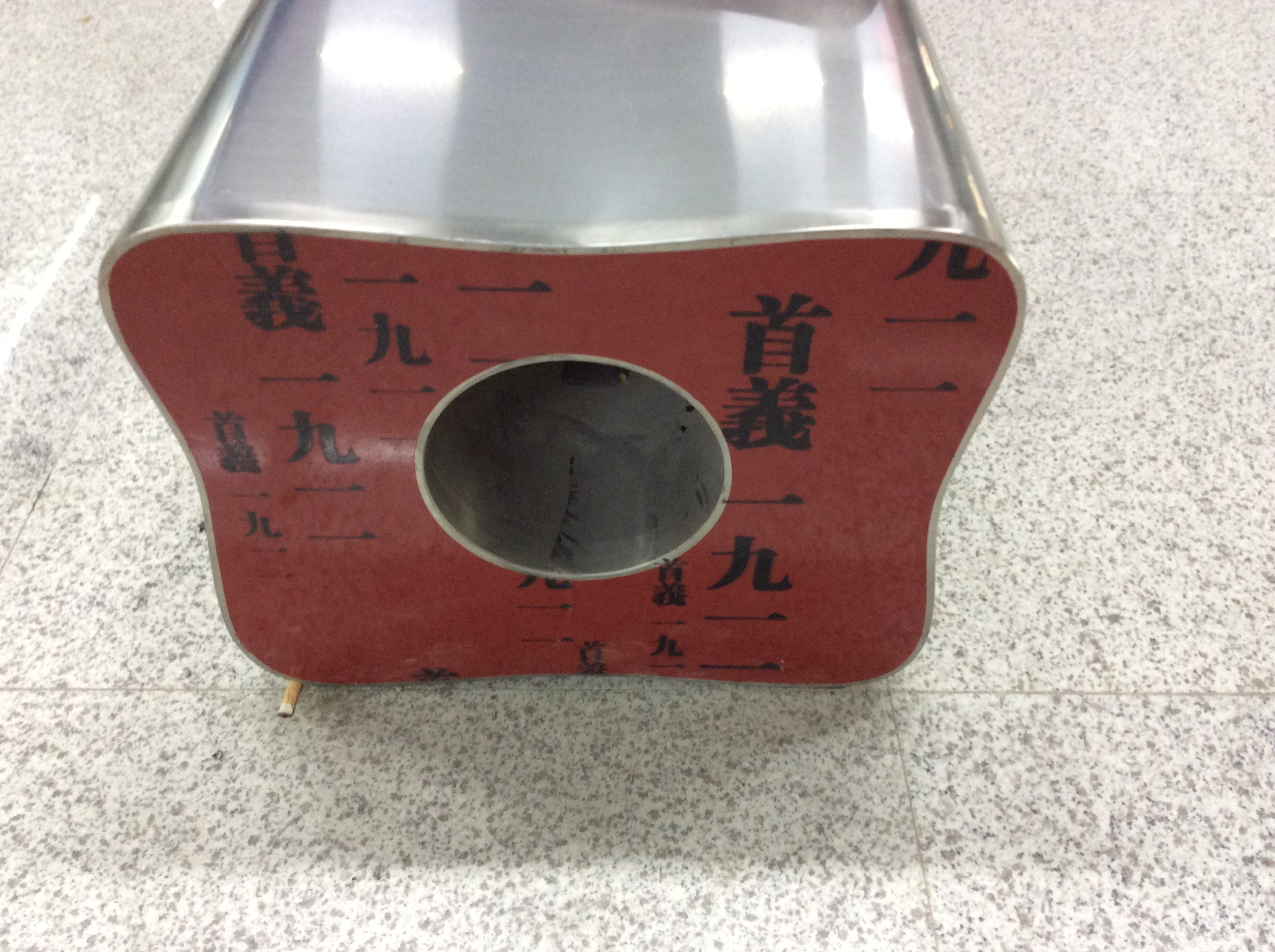
Chair
