= Fuxing Road station (Hangzhou Metro) =

Metro station in China

Coordinates: 30.2127°N 120.1591°E

Fuxing Road 复兴路
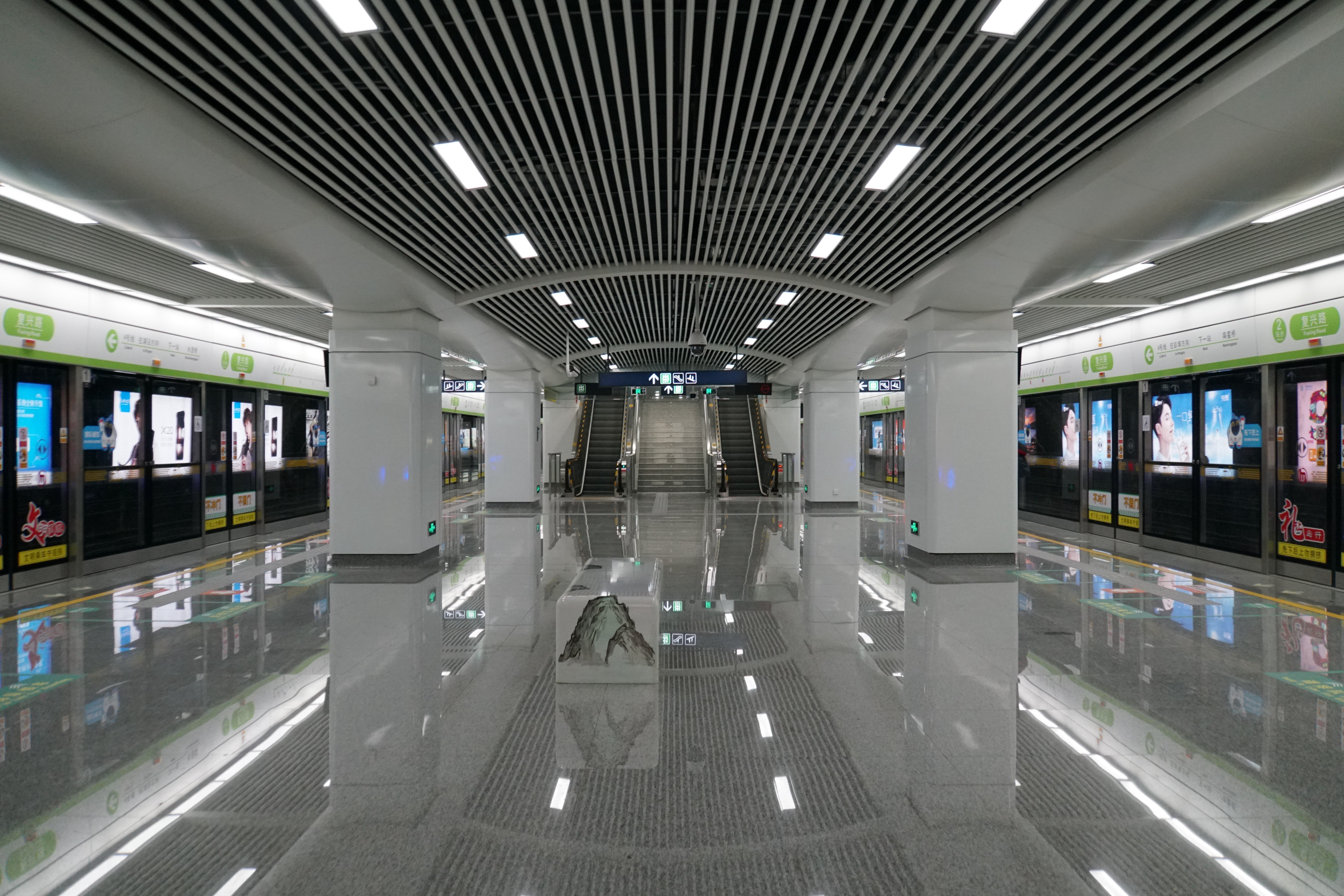

General information
- Location: Shangcheng District, Hangzhou, Zhejiang; China
- Operated by: Hangzhou Metro Corporation
- Line(s): Line 4
- Platforms: 2 (1 island platform)

History
- Opened: January 9, 2018

Services
Preceding station	Hangzhou Metro	Following station
Shuicheng Bridge towards Puyan	Line 4	Nanxingqiao towards Chihua Street

Fuxing Road (Chinese: 复兴路) is a metro station on Line 4 of the Hangzhou Metro in China. It is located in the Shangcheng District of Hangzhou.
