= Lanjiang Road station =

Metro station in Wuhan, China

Coordinates: 30.5459°N 114.2629°E

Lanjiang Road 拦江路
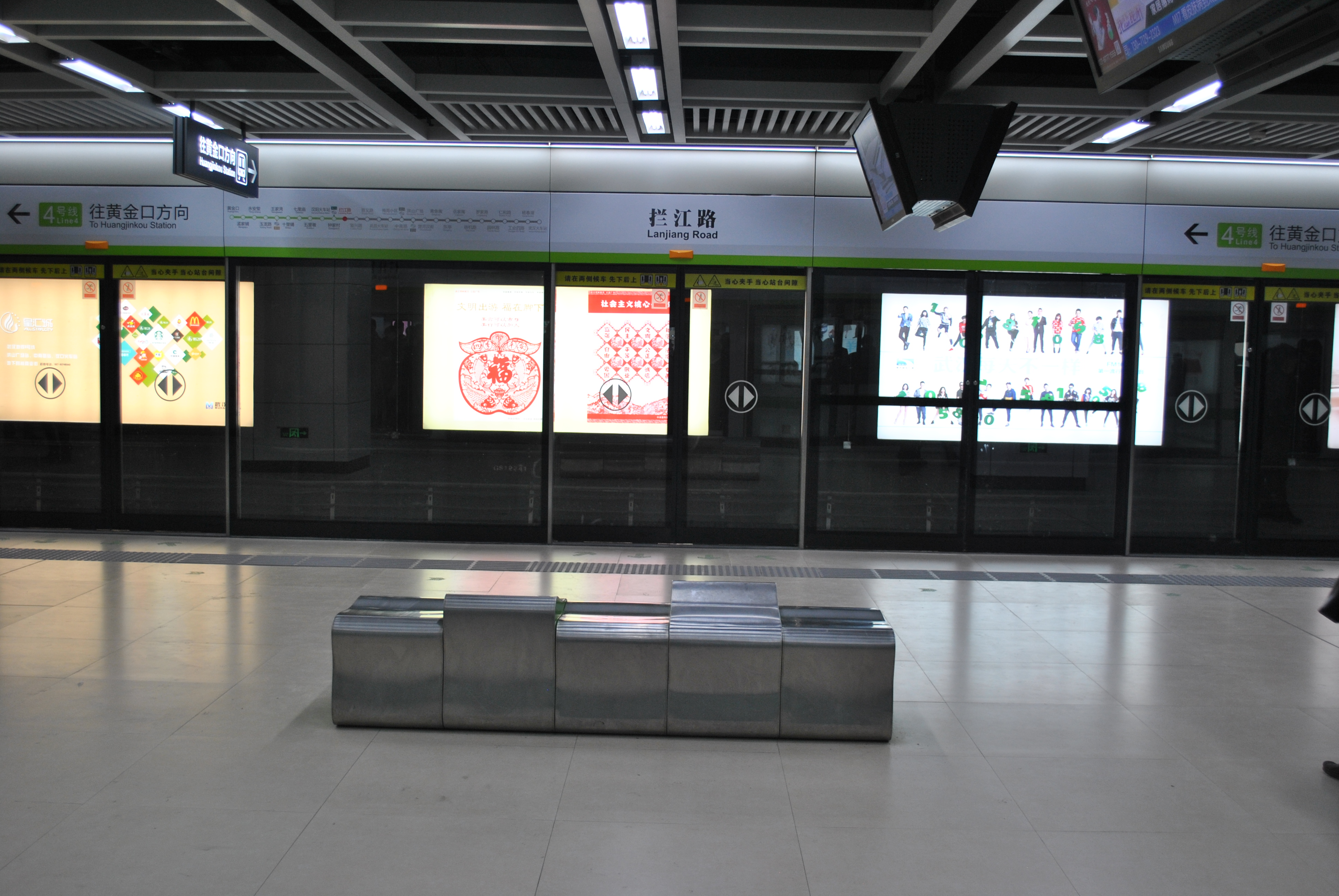

General information
- Location: Hanyang District, Wuhan, Hubei; China
- Operated by: Wuhan Metro Co., Ltd
- Line: Line 4
- Platforms: 2 (1 island platform)

Construction
- Structure type: Underground

History
- Opened: December 28, 2014

Services
Preceding station	Wuhan Metro	Following station
Zhongjiacun towards Bailin	Line 4	Fuxing Road towards Wuhan Railway Station
Location

Lanjiang Road Station (Chinese: 拦江路站) is a station of Line 4 of Wuhan Metro. It entered revenue service on December 28, 2014. It is located in Hanyang District.

== Station layout ==
G	Entrances and Exits
B1	Concourse	Faregates, Station Agent
B2	Westbound	← Line 4 towards Bailin (Zhongjiacun)
B2	Island platform, doors will open on the left
B2	Eastbound	Line 4 towards Wuhan Railway Station (Fuxing Road) →
