= Qiyi Street Mosque =

Mosque in Wuhan, Hubei, China

- 起义街清真寺
- Location of the mosque in Hubei

Religion
- Affiliation: Sunni Islam
- Ecclesiastical or organizational status: Mosque
- Status: Active

Location
- Location: 67 Qiyi Street, Wuchang, Wuhan, Hubei
- Country: China
- Interactive map of Qiyi Street Mosque
- Coordinates: 30°31′30″N 114°18′24″E

Architecture
- Type: Mosque

Specifications
- Capacity: 500 worshippers
- Site area: 2,300 m^{2} (25,000 sq ft)

The Qiyi Street Mosque (simplified Chinese: 起义街清真寺; traditional Chinese: 起義街清真寺; pinyin: Qǐyì Jiē Qīngzhēnsì) is a mosque in Wuchang District, Wuhan, in the Hubei province of China.

== Overview ==
The mosque complex covers 2,300 square metres (25,000 sq ft) and has a capacity of 500 worshippers.

The mosque is accessible within walking distance south of Shouyi Road station of Wuhan Metro.

== See also ==
Qiyi Street Mosque
- Traditional Chinese: 起義街清真寺
- Simplified Chinese: 起义街清真寺
Transcriptions
Standard Mandarin
- Hanyu Pinyin: Qǐyì Jiē Qīngzhēnsì

- Islam in China
- List of mosques in China
