= Haichao Temple =

Building in Hangzhou

- 海潮寺
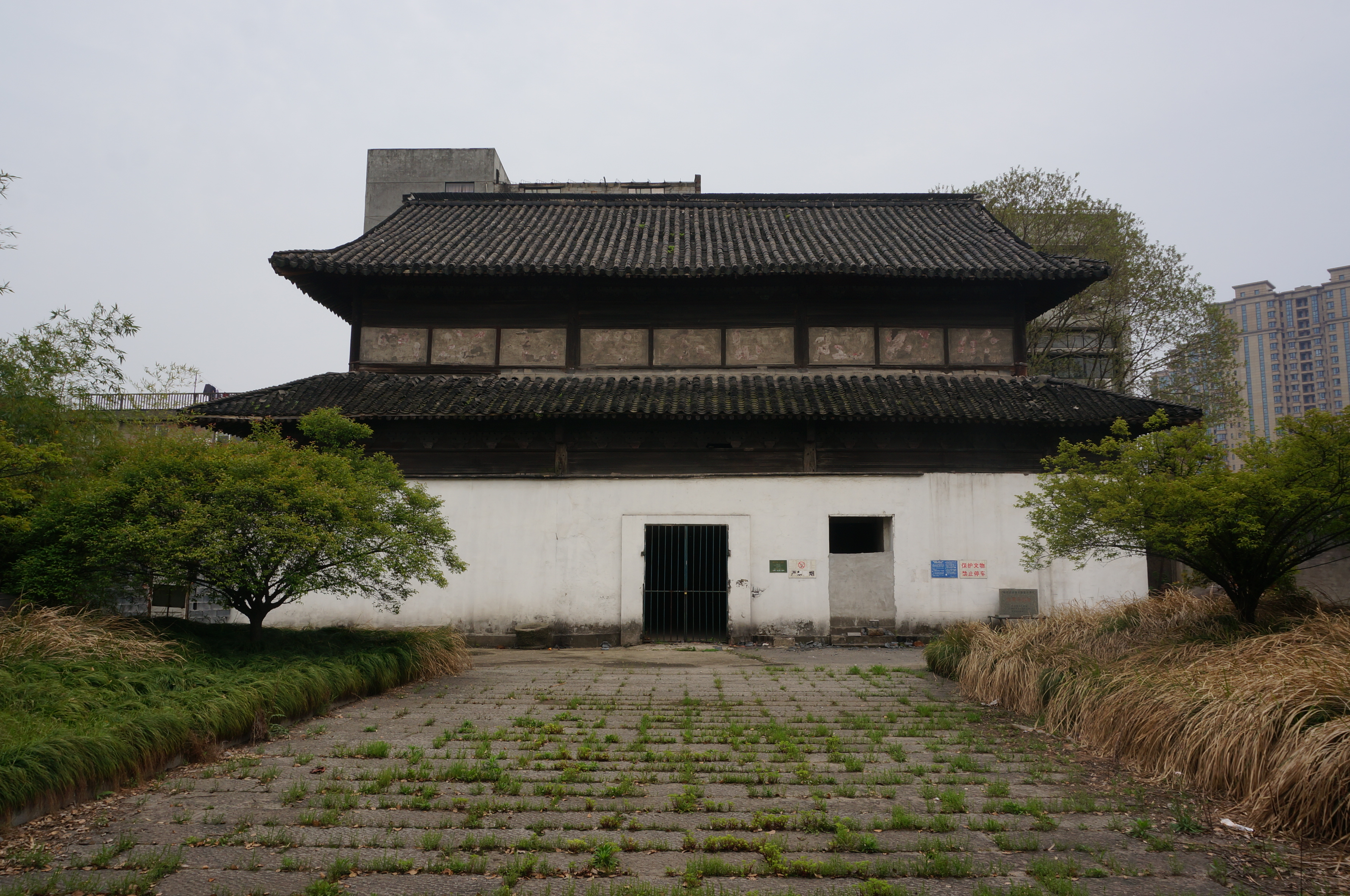
- The Hall of Four Heavenly Kings.

- Location within Zhejiang

Religion
- Affiliation: Buddhism
- Sect: Chan Buddhism

Location
- Location: Shangcheng District, Hangzhou, Zhejiang
- Country: China
- Interactive map of Haichao Temple
- Coordinates: 30°14′14″N 120°11′22″E

Architecture
- Style: Chinese architecture
- Established: Wanli period (1573–1620)

Haichao Temple (Chinese: 海潮寺; pinyin: Hǎicháo Sì) is a Buddhist temple located in Shangcheng District of Hangzhou, Zhejiang. Alongside Lingyin Temple, Jing Temple and Zhaoqing Temple, it was one of the Four Buddhist Temples in Hangzhou.

== History ==
Haichao Temple was originally built in the Wanli period (1573–1620) of the Ming dynasty (1368–1644). Haichao Temple was gradually fell into ruin when the Manchu invasion in the mid-17th century. The Bell Tower and Guanyin Hall were added to the temple in 1829, during the reign of Daoguang Emperor in the Qing dynasty (1644–1911). Haichao Temple was badly damaged in the Taiping Rebellion in 1861. It was renovated and refurbished in 1864. In 1881, abbot Puzhao (普照) built the Buddhist Texts Library for collecting a set of Chinese Buddhist canon, which was granted by Guangxu Emperor.

After the Second Sino-Japanese War broke out, it was used as the First Provisional Assistant Hospital of Zhejiang Province. In 1958, it became a rubber plant, which was officially called Zhongce Rubber Co., Ltd. (中策橡胶有限公司) in 1992. In 2016, the Hangzhou government planned to rebuild the temple on its original site.

In July 2000, it was inscribed as a municipal level cultural relic conservation unit by the Hangzhou government.

== Architecture ==
The temple formerly had many halls and rooms and now only the Hall of Four Heavenly Kings survived. The Hall of Four Heavenly Kings was built in 1890, during the ruling of Guangxu Emperor in late Qing dynasty (1644–1911).
