= Fuxing Road station (Wuhan Metro) =

Metro station in Wuhan, China

Fuxing Road 复兴路
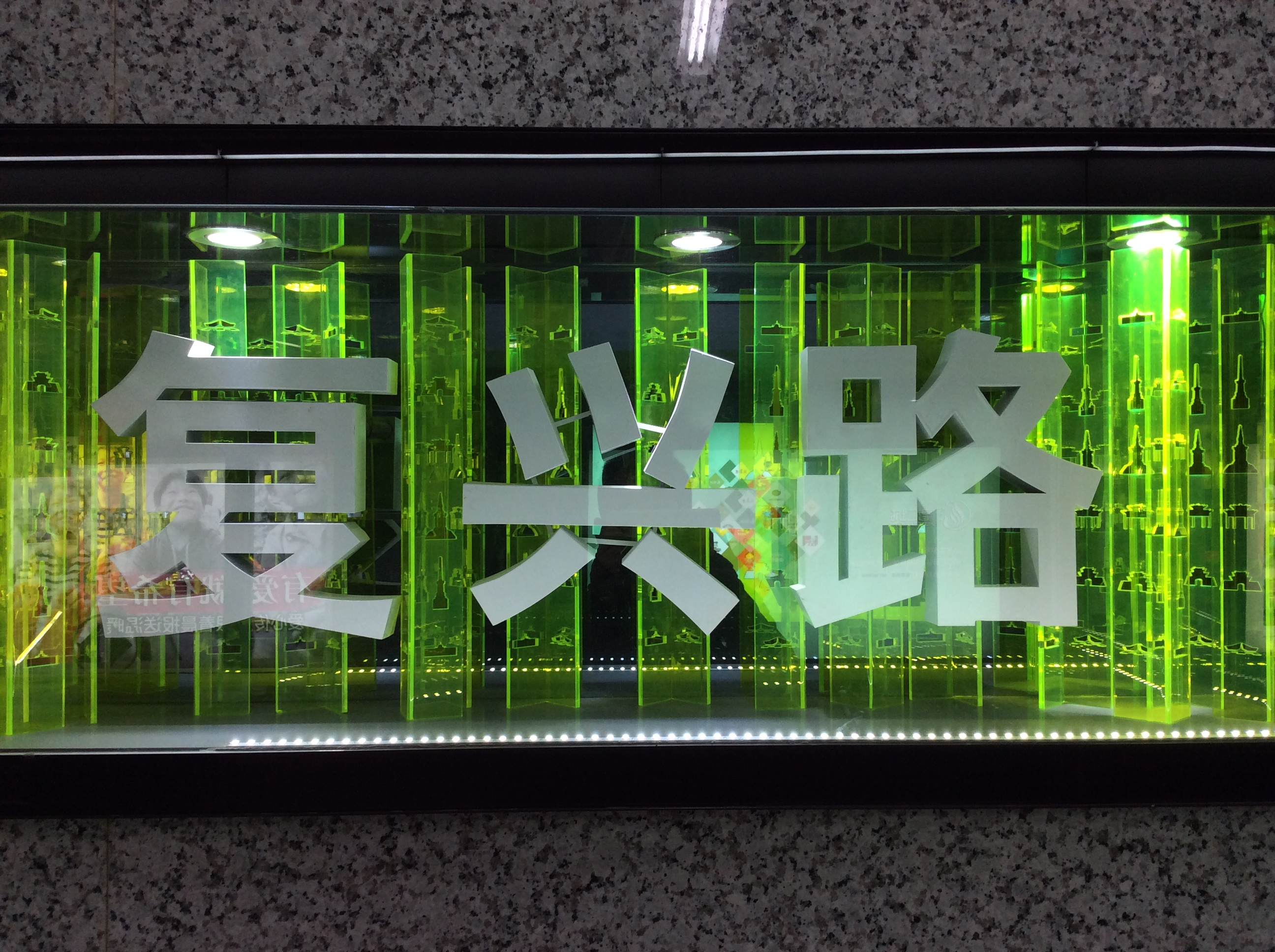

General information
- Location: Wuchang District, Wuhan, Hubei; China
- Coordinates: 30°32′12″N 114°17′45″E
- Operated by: Wuhan Metro Co., Ltd
- Lines: Line 4; Line 5
- Platforms: 4 (2 island platforms)

Construction
- Structure type: Underground

History
- Opened: December 28, 2014 (Line 4); December 26, 2021 (Line 5)

Services
Preceding station	Wuhan Metro	Following station
Lanjiang Road towards Bailin	Line 4	Shouyi Road towards Wuhan Railway Station
Pengliuyang towards East Square of Wuhan Railway Station	Line 5	Bapu Street towards Hongxia
Location

Fuxing Road Station (Chinese: 复兴路站) is a transfer station of Line 4 and Line 5 of the Wuhan Metro. It entered revenue service on December 28, 2014. It is located in Wuchang District.

== Station layout ==
G	Entrances and Exits	Exits A-D
B1	Concourse	Faregates, Station Agent
B2	Westbound	← Line 4 towards Bailin (Lanjiang Road)
B2	Island platform, doors will open on the left
B2	Eastbound	Line 4 towards Wuhan Railway Station (Shouyi Road) →

== Gallery ==
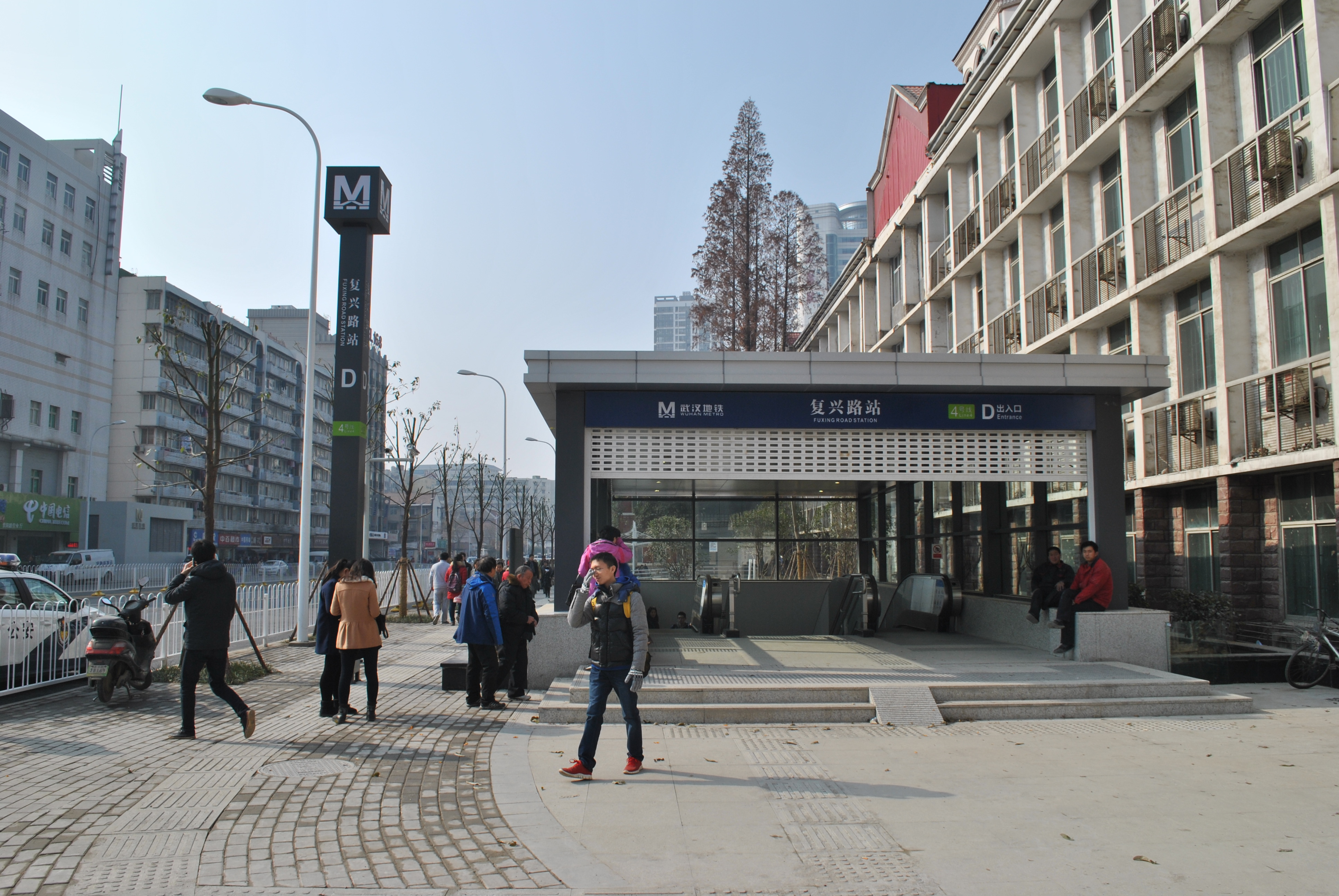
Entrance D

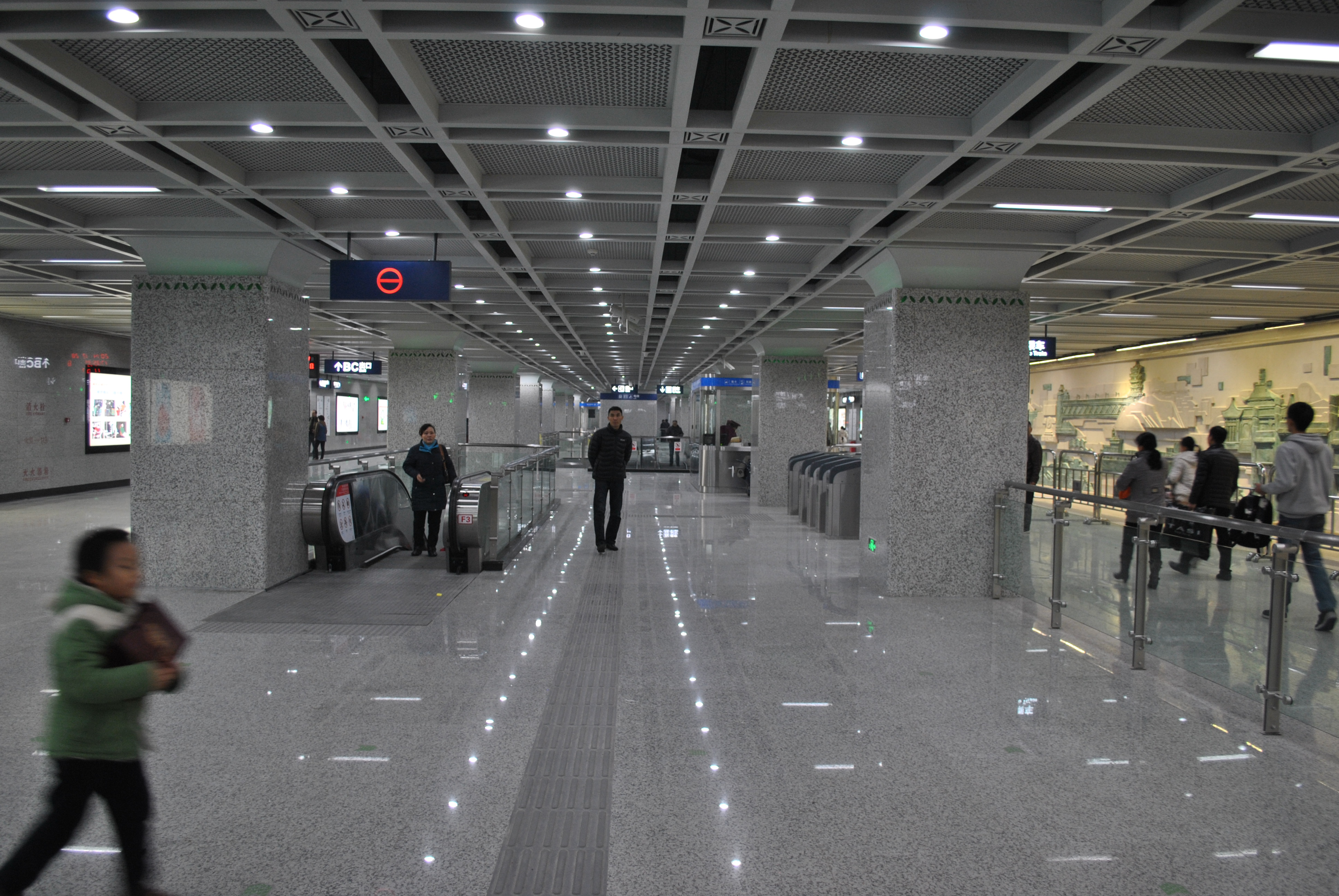
Concourse

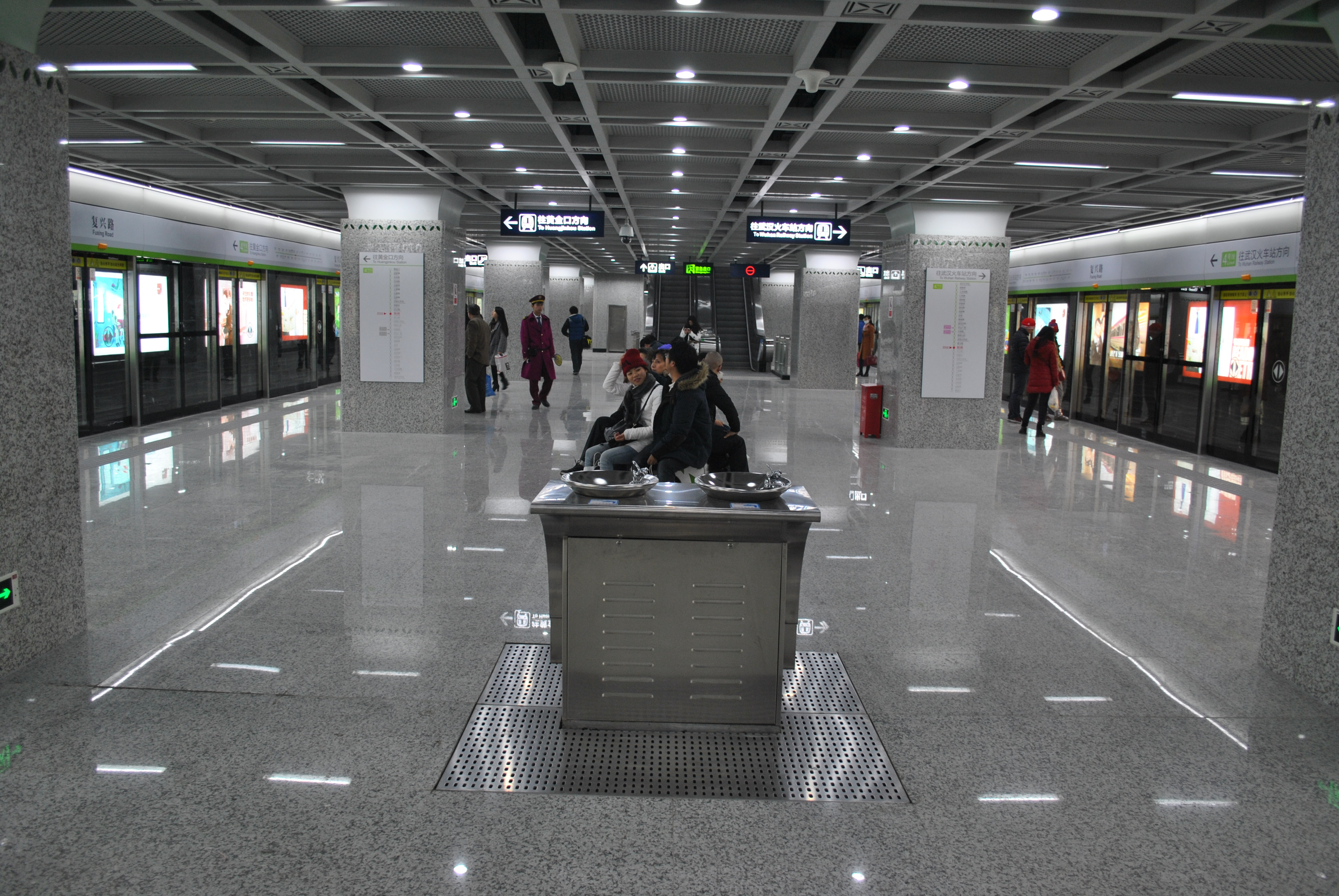
Platform

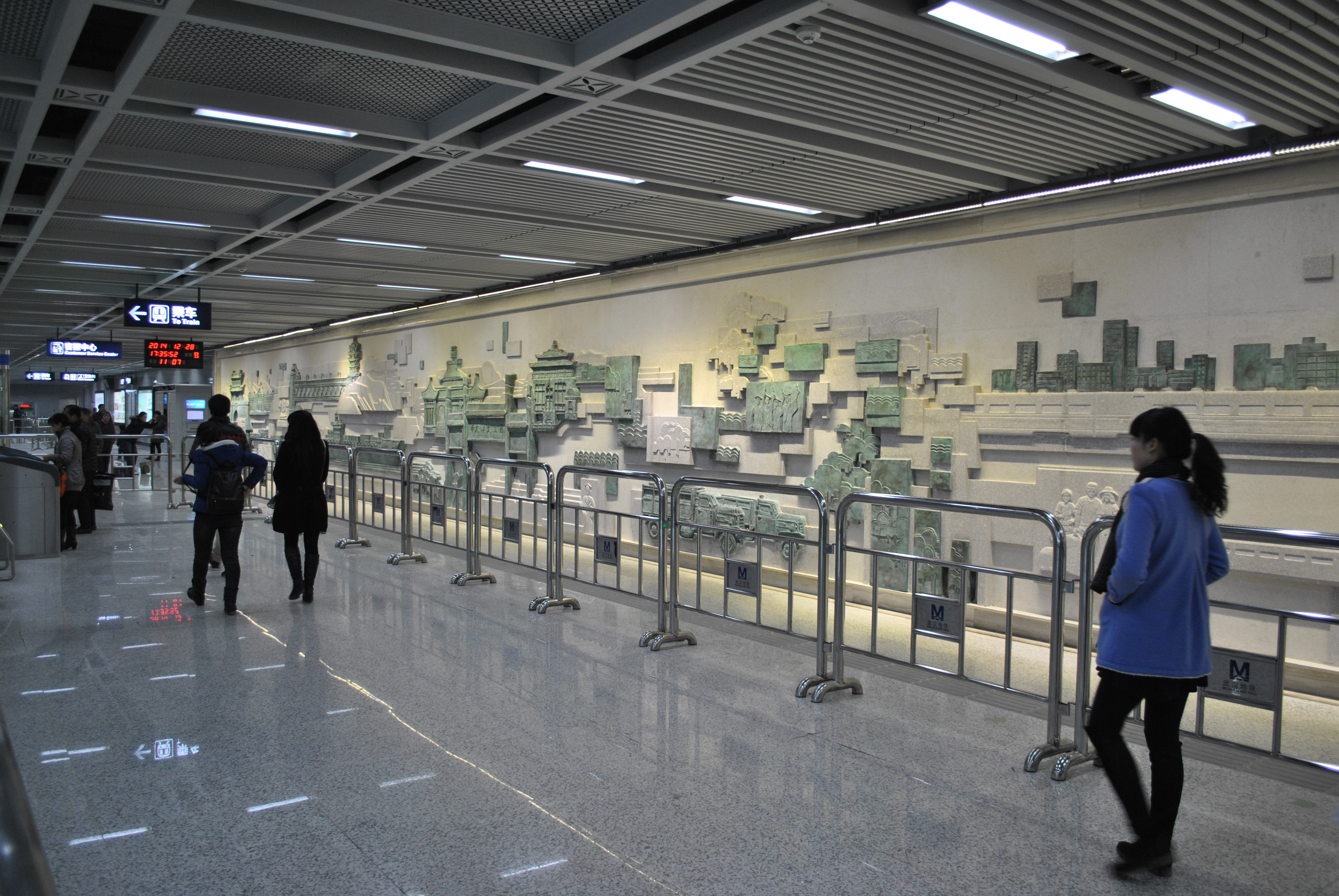
Wall
