= Shangcheng, Hangzhou =

Shangcheng 上城区
- District
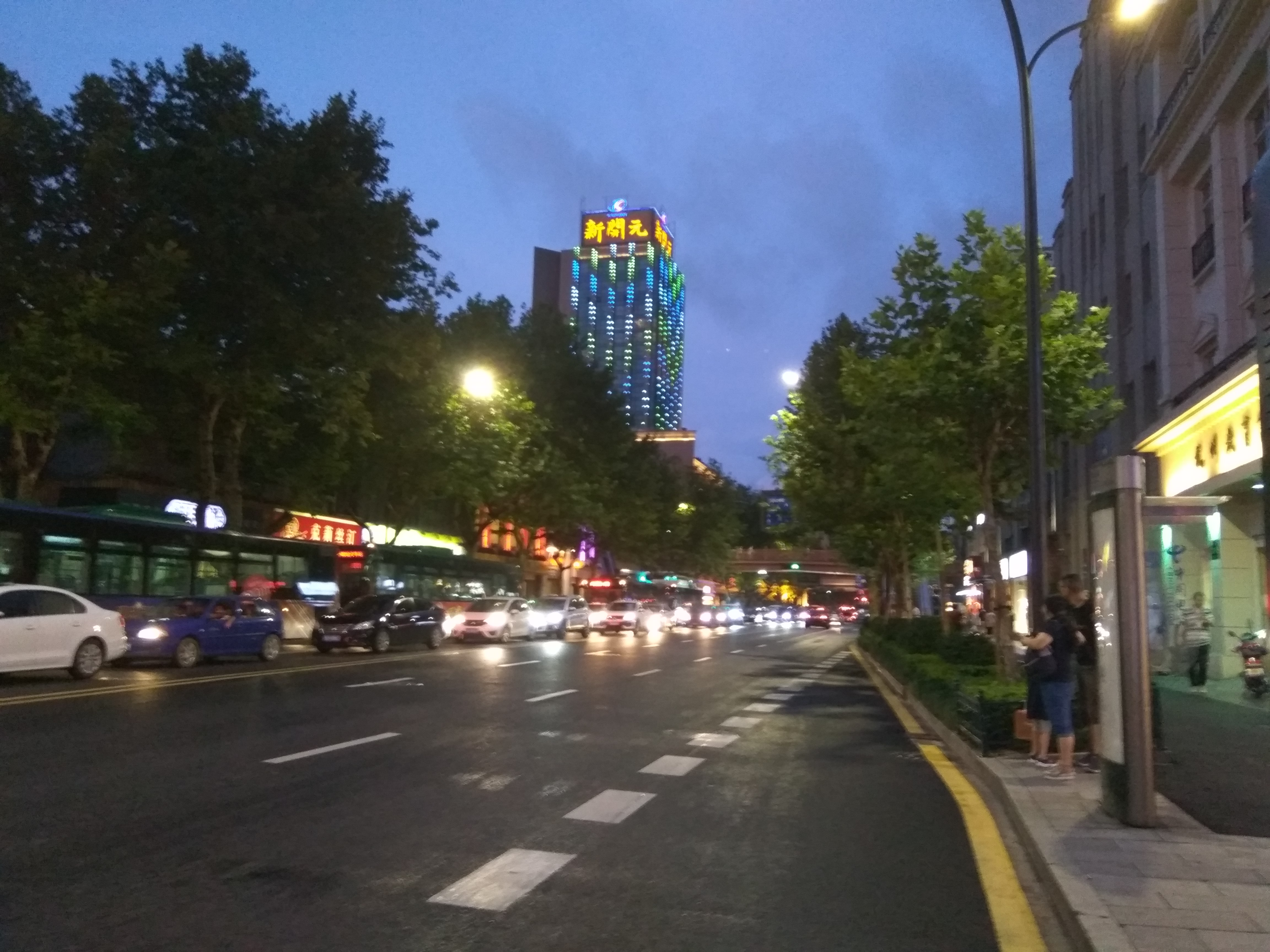
- Jiefang Road in Shangcheng

- Subdistricts of Shangcheng

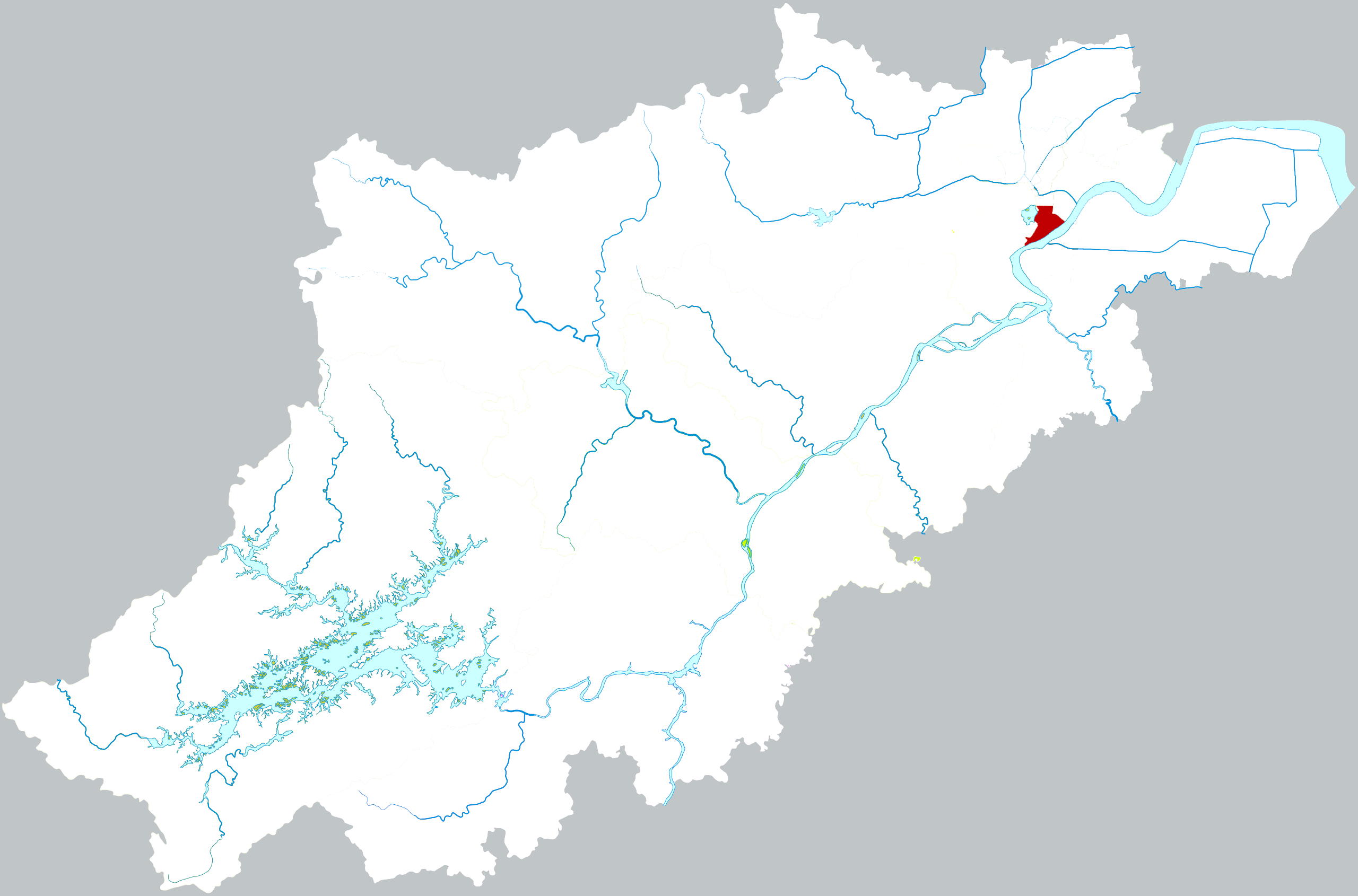
- Location of Shangcheng District within Hangzhou

- Location in Zhejiang
- Coordinates: 30°15′12″N 120°10′31″E
- Country: People's Republic of China
- Province: Zhejiang
- Sub-provincial city: Hangzhou

Area
  - Total: 119.68 km^{2} (46.21 sq mi)

Population (2022)
  - Total: 1,335,000
  - Density: 11,150/km^{2} (28,890/sq mi)
- Time zone: UTC+8 (China Standard)
- Postal code: 310001, 310002, 310003, 310008, 310009, 310016

Shangcheng, Hangzhou
- Simplified Chinese: 上城区
- Traditional Chinese: 上城區
- Literal meaning: "Upper" or "Former City"
Transcriptions
Standard Mandarin
- Hanyu Pinyin: Shàngchéng Qū

Shangcheng District (上城区) is an urban district of Hangzhou, Zhejiang, China.

== History ==
The district lies beside Hangzhou's famous West Lake and includes the territory of the former imperial Chinese cities of Qiantang and Lin'an, the imperial capital of the Song dynasty from 1138 to 1276. Hangzhou's four imperial academies were located here. They were the Wansong Academy (万松书院, now a park), the Ziyang Academy (紫阳书院, now Ziyang Primary School), the Qiushi Academy (求是书院, now Zhejiang University), and the Zongwen Academy (宗文书院, now Zhangzhou No.10 High School).

=== Present ===
The district government is located on 3 Huimin Rd. The district hosts the headquarters of military region in the province and is also known for its prison where political prisoners such as Zhu Yufu are incarcerated. Some prominent schools are located nearby, including the China Academy of Art, Hangzhou Second High School, and Hangzhou Fourth High School.

== Administrative divisions ==
Subdistricts:

- Qingpo Subdistrict (清波街道), Hubin Subdistrict (湖滨街道), Xiaoying Subdistrict (小营街道), Nanxing Subdistrict (南星街道), Ziyang Subdistrict (紫阳街道), Wangjiang Subdistrict (望江街道)

== Honors ==
Honorary Title	Grant Institution	Grant Time
National Harmonious Community Construction Demonstration City	Ministry of Civil Affairs	January 2013
National "Swimming Town"	State Sports General Administration	April 2001
National Science and Technology Progress Demonstration City (District, County)	Ministry of Science and Technology	March 2004
2011 Zhejiang Province to create an advanced unit of work in the county (city, district)	Zhejiang Provincial Committee	August 2012
Double model city(Chinese: 双拥模范城区)	Zhejiang Provincial Party Committee, Zhejiang Government, Military Region	July 2014
Zhejiang Province Sports County (City, District)	Zhejiang Government	December 2011

== Religion ==
The local people believe in Buddhism, Taoism, Catholicism and Protestantism. Haichao Temple is one of the most famous Buddhist temples in the area.
