= Heyu Road station =

Metro station in Hangzhou, China

Heyu Road 荷禹路
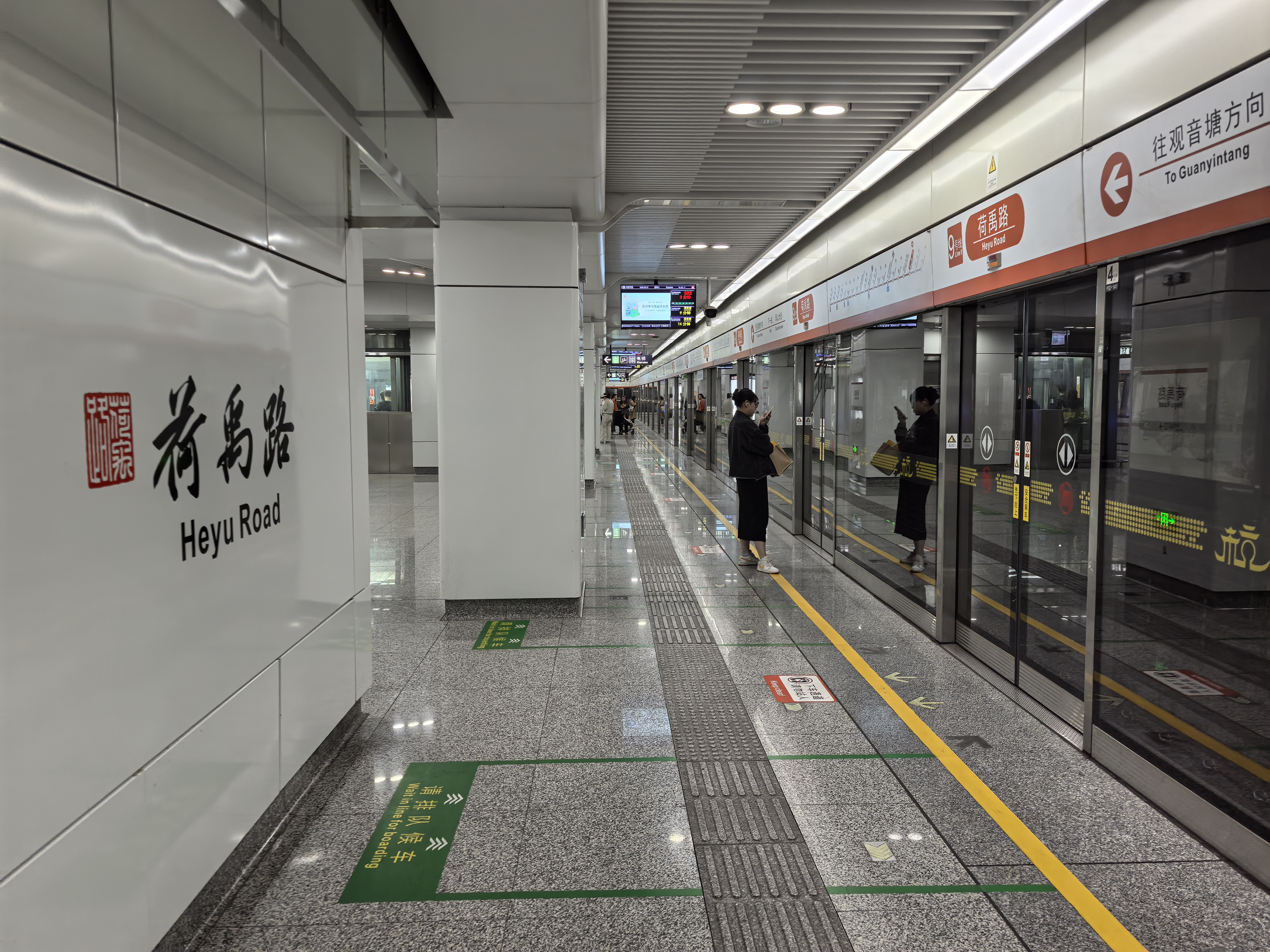

General information
- Location: Linping District, Hangzhou, Zhejiang; China
- Operated by: Hangzhou Metro Corporation
- Line: Line 9
- Platforms: 2 (1 island platform)

History
- Opened: 17 September 2021

Services
| Preceding station | Hangzhou Metro | Following station |
|---|---|---|
| Qiushan Avenue towards Guanyintang | Line 9 | Wuzhou Road towards Long'an |
Location

Heyu Road (Chinese: 荷禹路) is a metro station of Line 9 of the Hangzhou Metro in China. It is located in Linping District of Hangzhou. The station was opened on 17 September 2021.
