= Qiushan Avenue station =

Metro station in Hangzhou, China

Qiushan Avenue 邱山大街
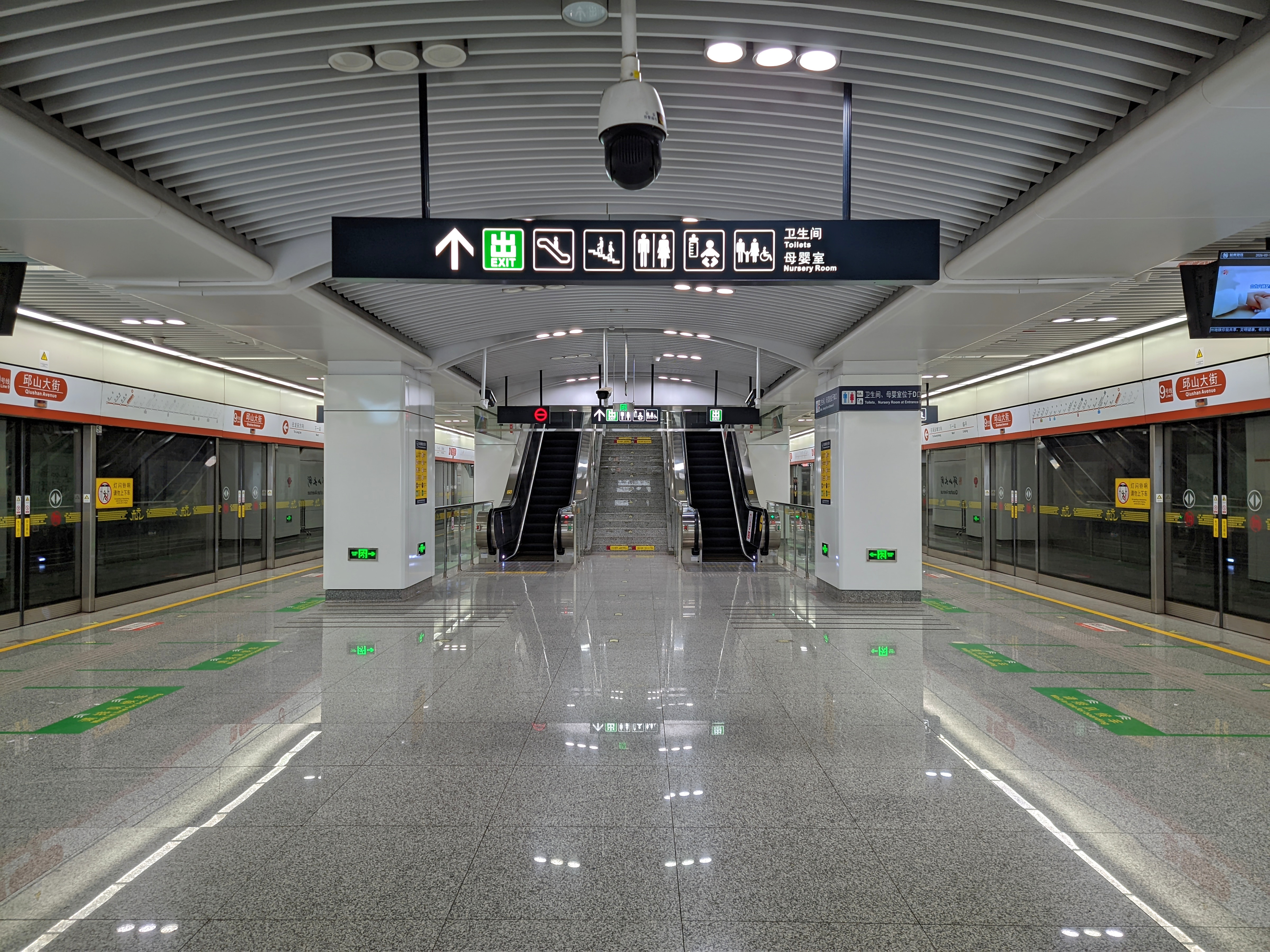
- Platforms

Chinese name
- Chinese: 邱山大街站
Transcriptions
Standard Mandarin
- Hanyu Pinyin: Qiūshān Dàjiē Zhàn

General information
- Location: Yingbin Road (迎宾路) × Qiushan Avenue; Linping District, Hangzhou, Zhejiang; China
- Coordinates: 30°25′22″N 120°17′27″E
- System: Hangzhou Metro
- Operator: Hangzhou Metro Corporation
- Line: Line 9
- Platforms: 2 (1 island platform)
- Tracks: 2

Construction
- Structure type: Underground
- Accessible: Yes

History
- Opened: 17 September 2021

Services
Preceding station	Hangzhou Metro	Following station
Linping towards Guanyintang	Line 9	Heyu Road towards Long'an
Location

Qiushan Avenue (Chinese: 邱山大街) is a metro station of Line 9 of the Hangzhou Metro in China. It is located in Linping District of Hangzhou. The station was opened on 17 September 2021.

== Station layout ==
Qiushan Avenue has three floors: basement 2 is a concourse, and basement 3 is an island platform with two tracks for line 9.

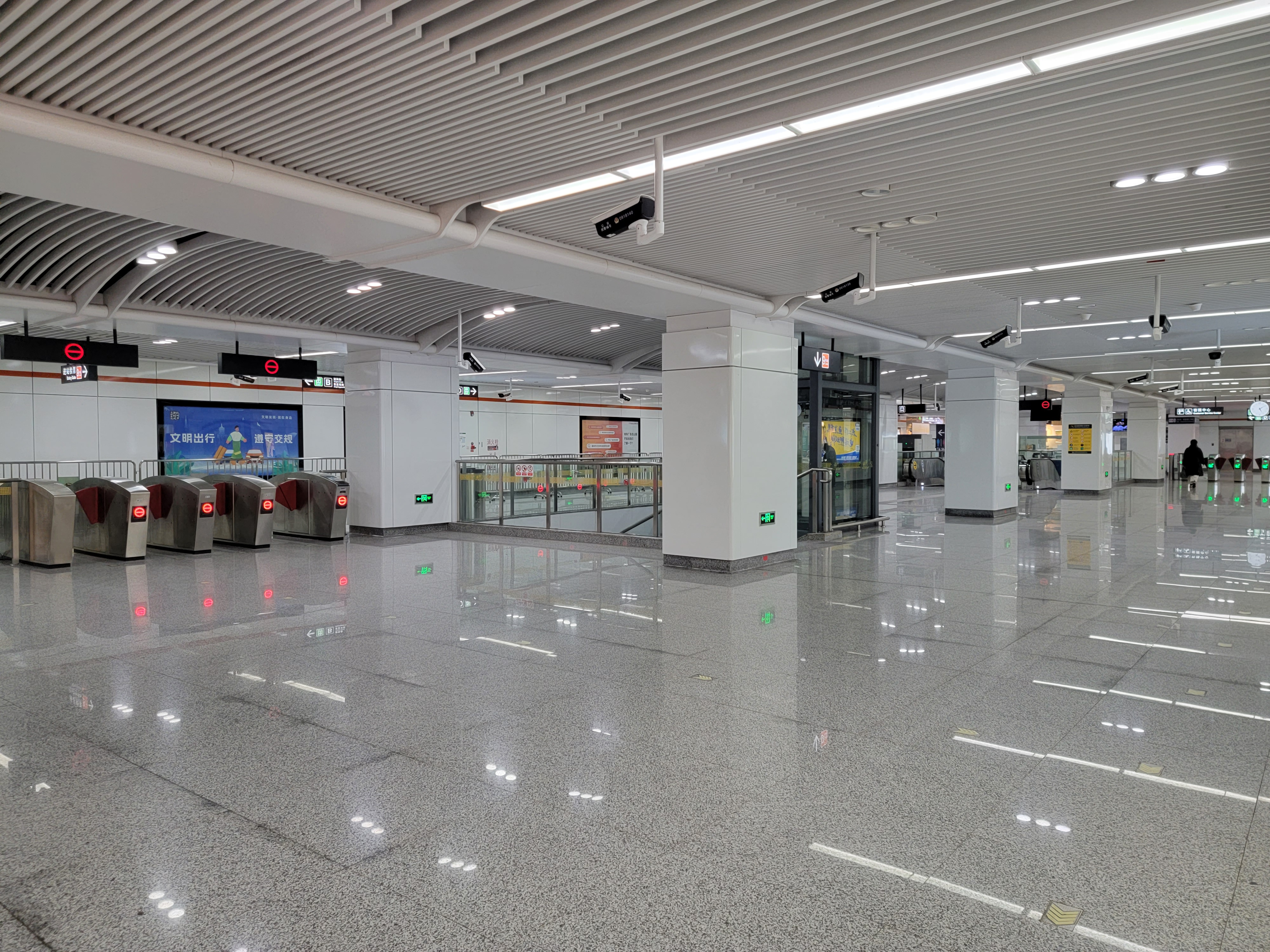
Concourse

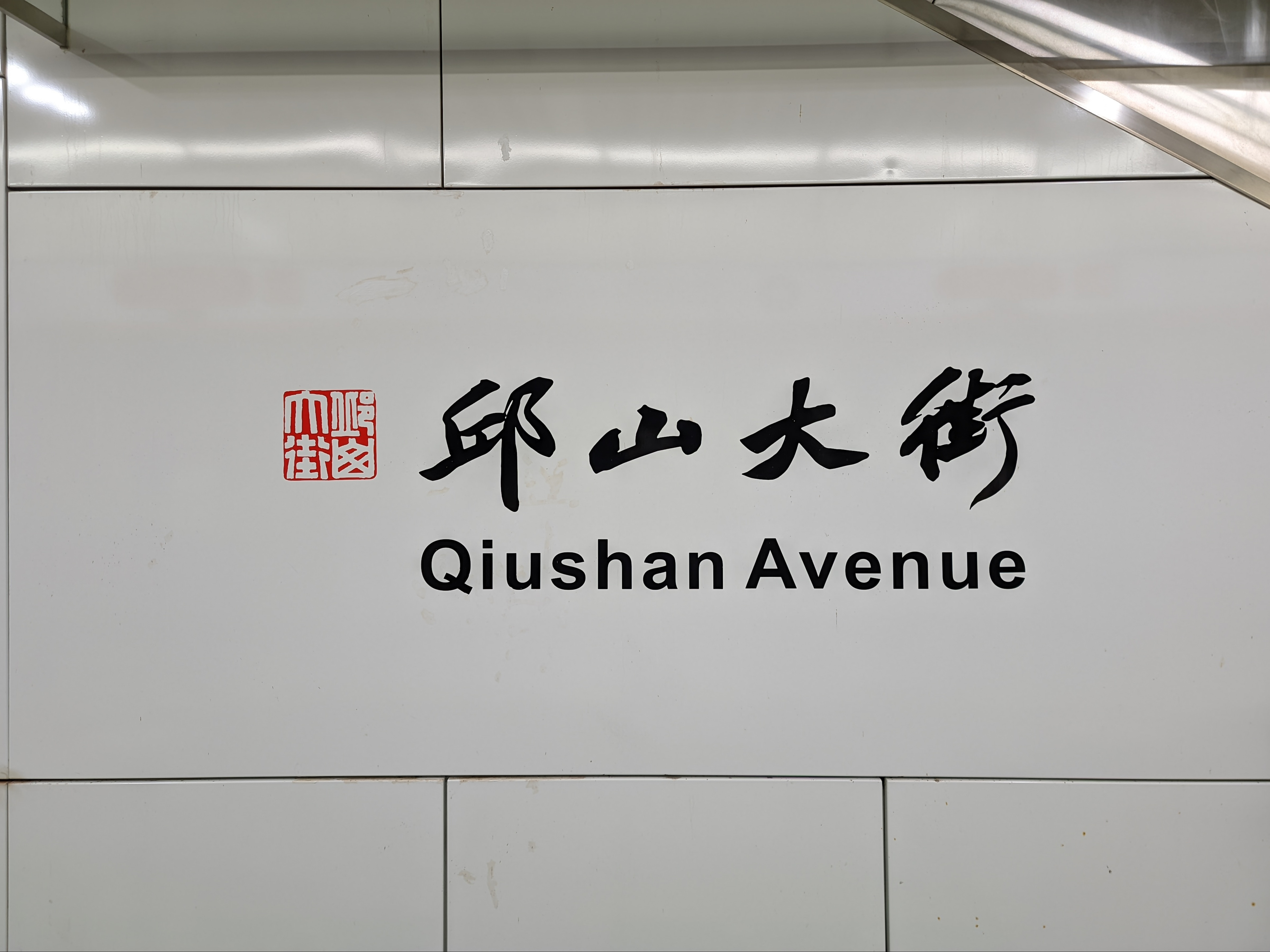
Billboard

== Entrances/exits ==
- B: Yingbin Road, Jingxingguan Road (景星观路)
- D: Yingbin Road, Qiushan Avenue
