= Qiaosi station =

Hangzhou Metro station

Coordinates: 30°20′57″N 120°16′51″E

Qiaosi 乔司
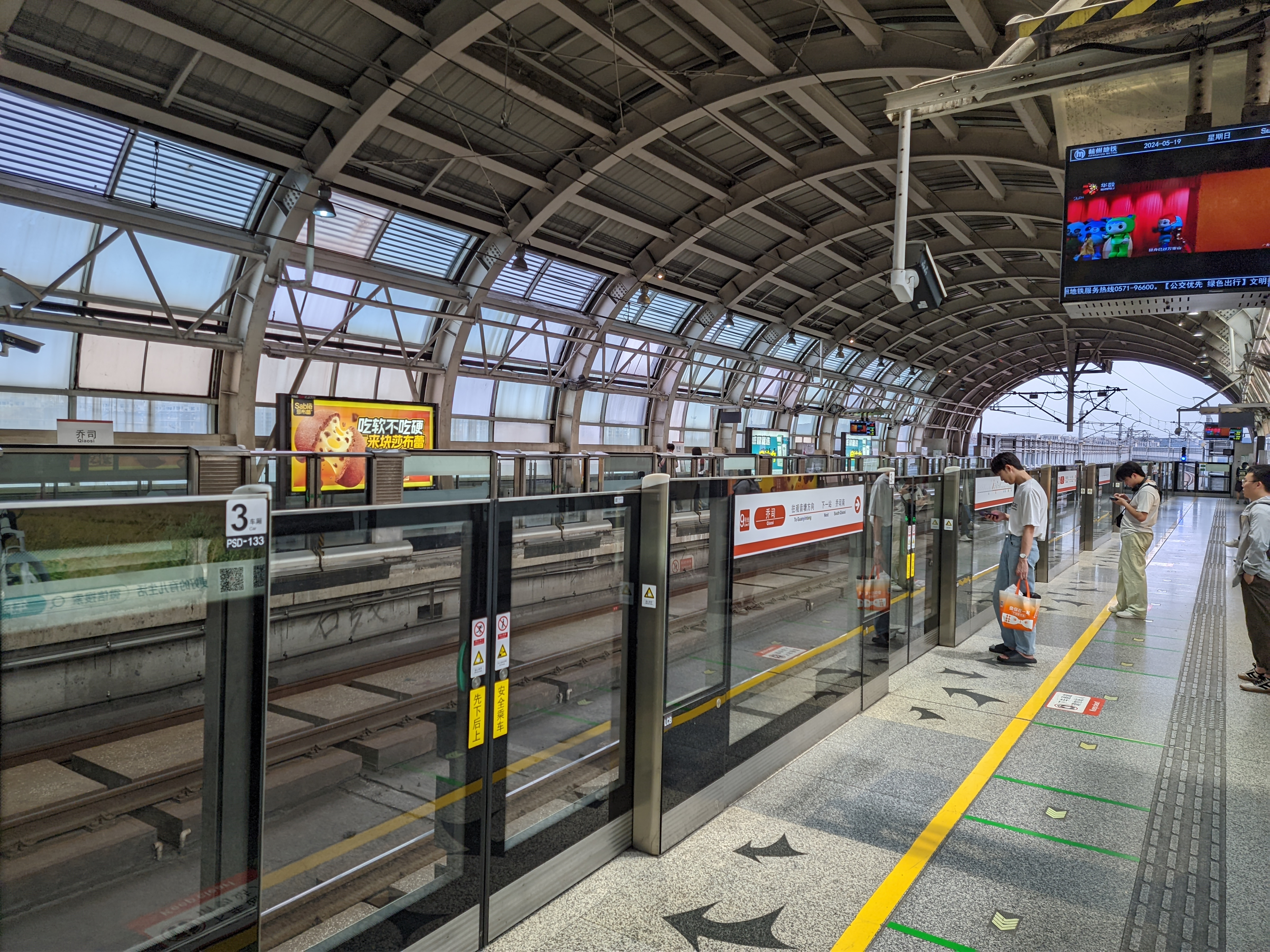
- Platform

General information
- Location: Linping District, Hangzhou, Zhejiang; China
- Operated by: Hangzhou Metro Corporation
- Line: Line 9

Services
Preceding station	Hangzhou Metro	Following station
South Qiaosi towards Guanyintang	Line 9	Wengmei towards Long'an
Location

Qiaosi (Chinese: 乔司) is a station on Line 9 of the Hangzhou Metro in China. It was opened in November 2012. It is located in the Linping District of Hangzhou.
