= Wengmei station =

Metro station in Hangzhou, China

Coordinates: 30°22′02″N 120°17′26″E

Wengmei 翁梅
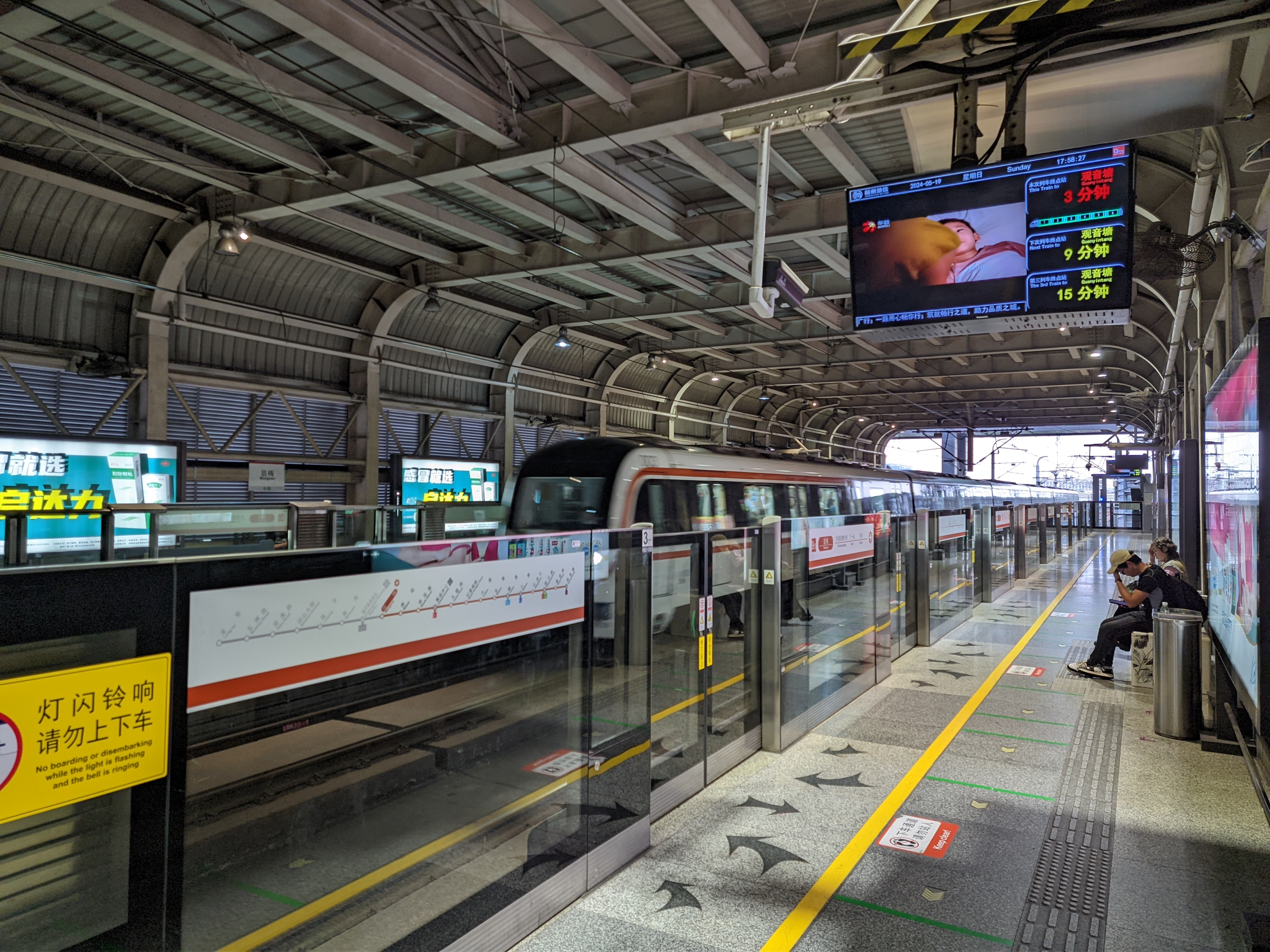
- Platform

General information
- Location: Linping District, Hangzhou, Zhejiang; China
- Operated by: Hangzhou Metro Corporation
- Line: Line 9

Services
Preceding station	Hangzhou Metro	Following station
Qiaosi towards Guanyintang	Line 9	Linpingnan Railway Station towards Long'an
Location

Wengmei (Chinese: 翁梅) is a station on Line 9 of the Hangzhou Metro in China. It was opened in November 2012. It is located in the Linping District of Hangzhou.
