= Nanyuan station (Hangzhou Metro) =

Metro station in Hangzhou, China

Nanyuan 南苑
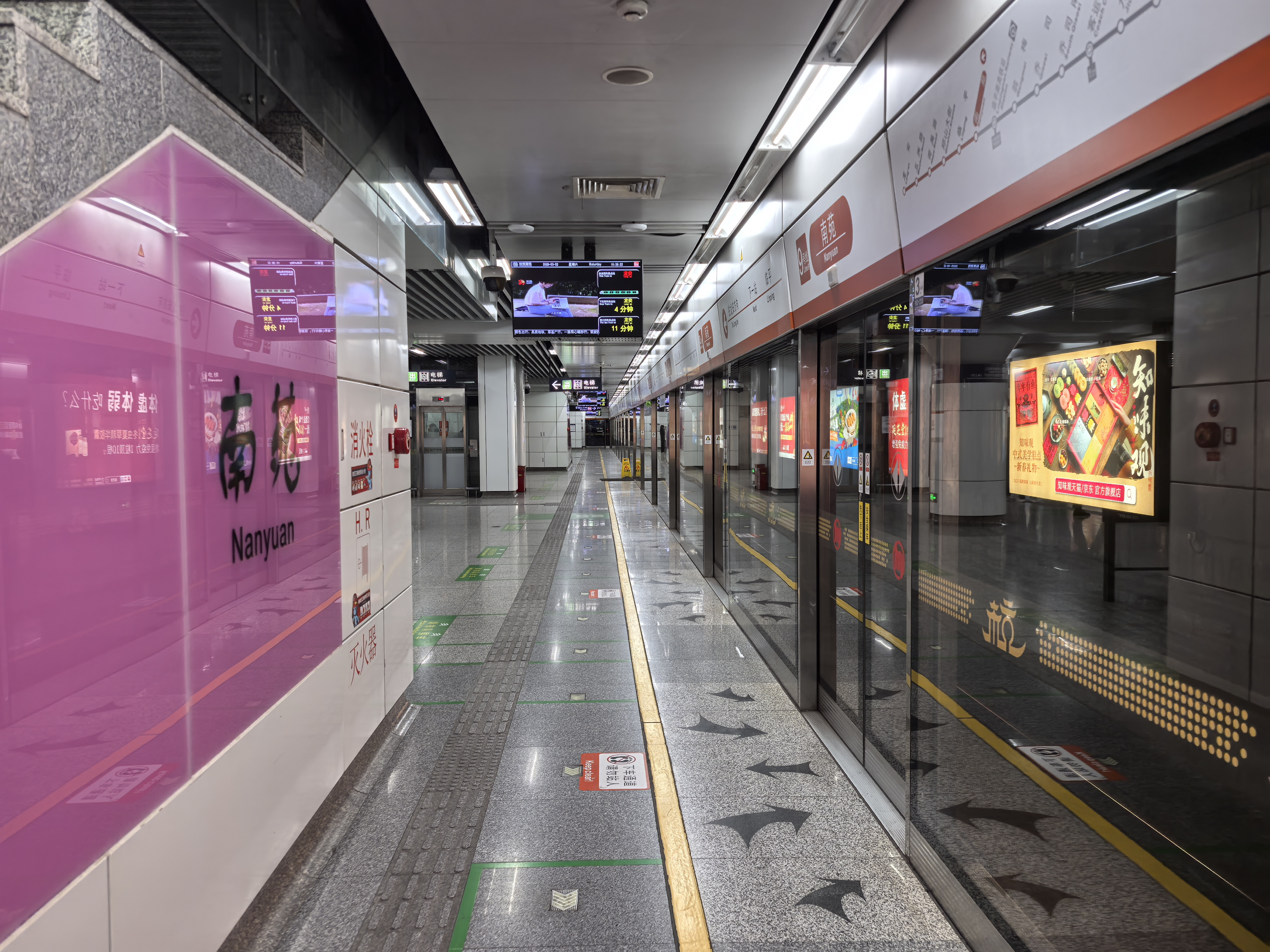
- Platform

General information
- Location: Yingbin Road (迎宾路) × Lindong Road (临东路) & Tingcheng Road (汀城路); Linping District, Hangzhou, Zhejiang; China
- Coordinates: 30°23′50″N 120°17′52″E
- Operated by: Hangzhou Metro Corporation
- Line: Line 9
- Platforms: 2 (1 island platform)

Construction
- Structure type: Underground
- Accessible: Yes

History
- Opened: 24 November 2012

Services
Preceding station	Hangzhou Metro	Following station
Linpingnan Railway Station towards Guanyintang	Line 9	Linping towards Long'an
Location

Nanyuan (Chinese: 南苑) is a station on Line 9 of the Hangzhou Metro in China. It is located in the Linping District of Hangzhou. It was opened in 24 November 2012 as a station of the branch of Line 1. On 10 July 2021, the branch line was separated from Line 1 and it became a station of Line 9.

== Station layout ==
Nanyuan has two levels: a concourse, and an island platform with two tracks for line 9.

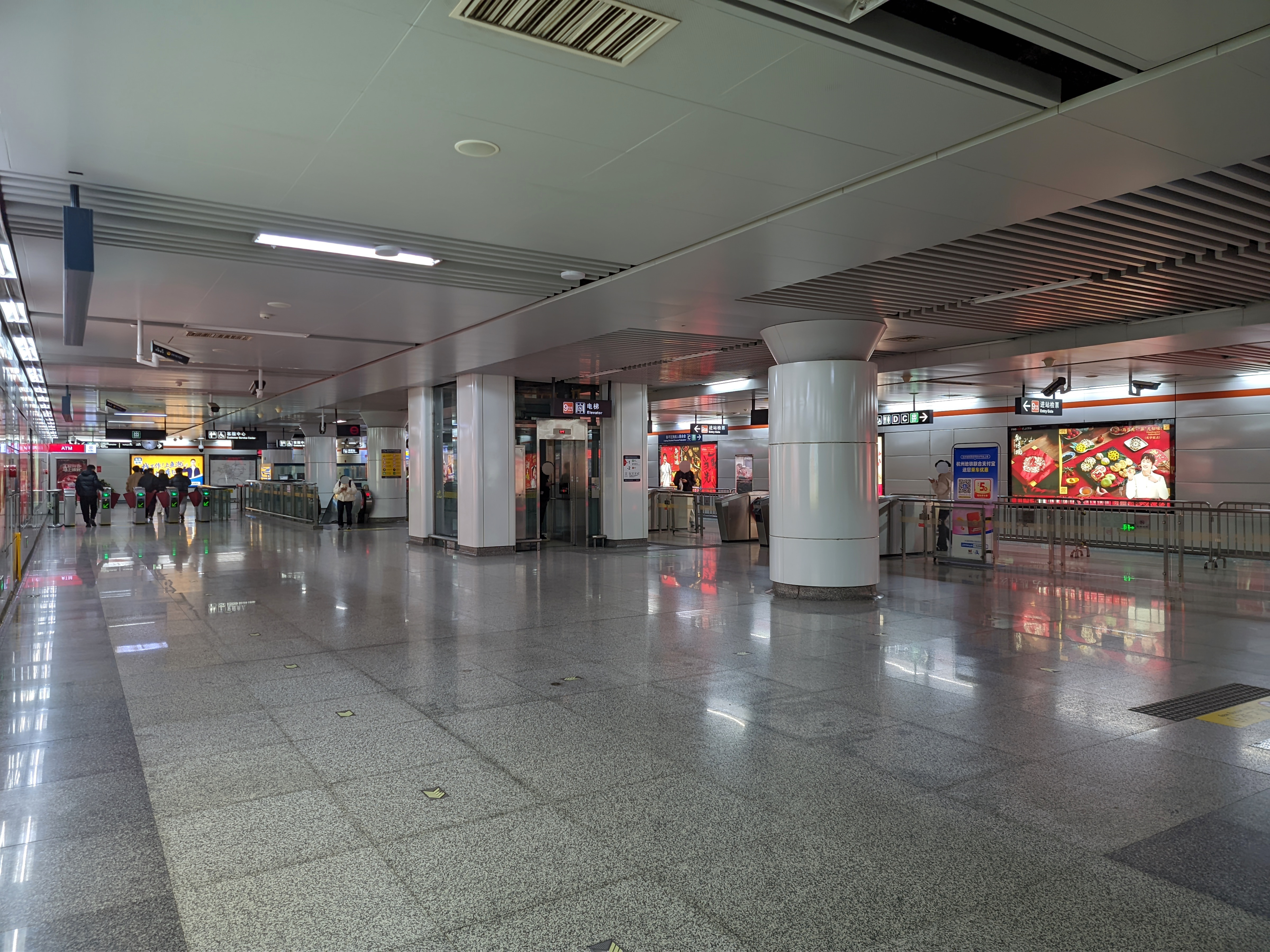
Concourse

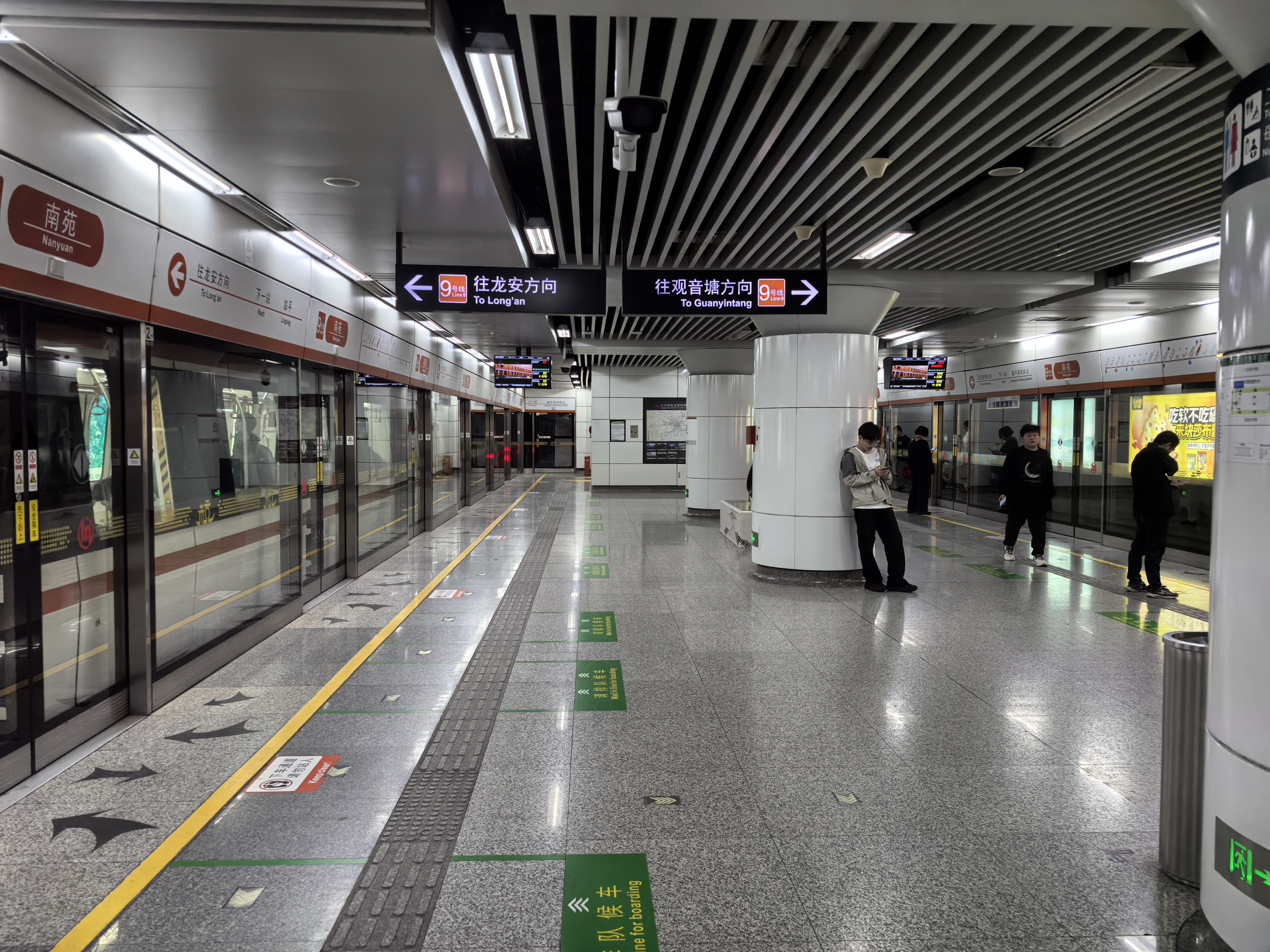
Platforms

== Entrances/exits ==
- A: First People's Hospital of Linping District
- B: Tingcheng Road
- C: Linping Disabled Persons' Federation
- D: Yingbin Road
