= Tangxi, Hangzhou =

Tangxi 塘栖
- Town
- 塘栖镇
- Interactive map of Tangxi
- Coordinates: 30°47′N 120°18′E
- Country: People's Republic of China
- Province: Zhejiang
- Sub-provincial city: Hangzhou
- District: Linping

Population
  - Total: 90 000
- Time zone: UTC+8 (China Standard)
- Postal code: 311106
- Area code: 0571

Tangxi, Hangzhou
- Chinese: 塘栖
Transcriptions
Standard Mandarin
- Hanyu Pinyin: Tángxī / Tángqī

Tangxi, often referred to as Tangqi, is a town located in Linping District of Hangzhou, Zhejiang province, China, 10 kilometers away from the city center of Hangzhou. Located in the northwest of Linping District, east of Canal Street, Linping Street, south, southwest of Chongxian Street, west of Renhe Street, north of Huzhou Deqing County Leidian Town, Xin'an Town, Yuyue town adjacent, it is 13 kilometers away from Yuhang city. Tangxi was established a thousand years ago and has a total area is 79 square kilometers. It is famous for its loquats and Prunus mume in the neighboring area of Chaoshan Mountain.

== Administrative division ==
In April 2006, Hotel Dai Village was transformed into a community.

By the end of 2011, Tangqi Town had jurisdiction over 7 communities and 27 village committees: Leyuan, Guangji Road, Nanyuan, Xihe, Donghe, Shuibei, Hotel Dai, Xiyuan, Tangqi, Dinghe, Dingshan River, Chaoding, Chaoshan, Chaijiawu, Taishan, Hongpan, Hexi Dai, Tangjiadai, Tangjiadai, Mojia Bridge, Xihe, Tangbei, Shaojiaba, Sanwen, Gangbei, Zhanghe, Zhujiajiao, Longdock, Tushan Dam, Lijiaqiao, Gu Lin, Quanzhang, Yao Jiadai, A total of 34 mass self-governing organizations; It consists of 407 resident groups and 498 village groups.

As of June 2020, Tangqi Town has jurisdiction over 14 communities and 21 administrative villages: Xixiaohe Community, Dongxiaohe Community, Guangji Road Community, Nanyuan Community, Leyuan Community, Shuibei Community, Guadai Community, Huacheng Community, Zhujiajiao Community, Lianhua Community, Wangmei Community, Pipawan Community, Longchuanwu Community, Kangda Community, Mojiaqiao Village, Hexidai Village, Tangjiadai Village, Sanwen Village, Dinghe Village, Quanzhang Village, Xijiedhe Village, Lijiaqiao Village, Chaijiawu Village, Yao Jiadai Village, Shaojiaba village, Chaoshan Village, Taishan Village, Dingshanhe Village, Tangbei Village, Chaoding village, Sanxing Village, Xihe Village, Hongpan Village, Tangqi Village, Xiyuan Village, town people's government in Leyuan community Renmin Road No. 300.

== History ==
Tangxi was first built in the Northern Song dynasty (960–1127). It used to be a small fishing village. During the Yuan dynasty, Zhang Shicheng broadened the Grand Canal, and local fishermen gradually settled down on both sides. In the Ming dynasty, the Tongji Bridge (通济桥) connected both sides, and the town was enlarged. During the Ming and Qing dynasties, Tangxi ranked the first of top ten famous towns in the Jiangnan region. Originally, Tangxi twas under the administration of Renhe County.

During the Republican era, Tangxi became part of the newly established Hang County. Before 1949, Tangxi consisted of northern and southern towns, with the southern town belonging to Hang County and the northern town belonging to Deqing County. In May 1950, Tangxi ended the separation.

Currently, Tangxi is a town in Linping District of Hangzhou.

== Historical sites ==
=== Guangji Bridge ===
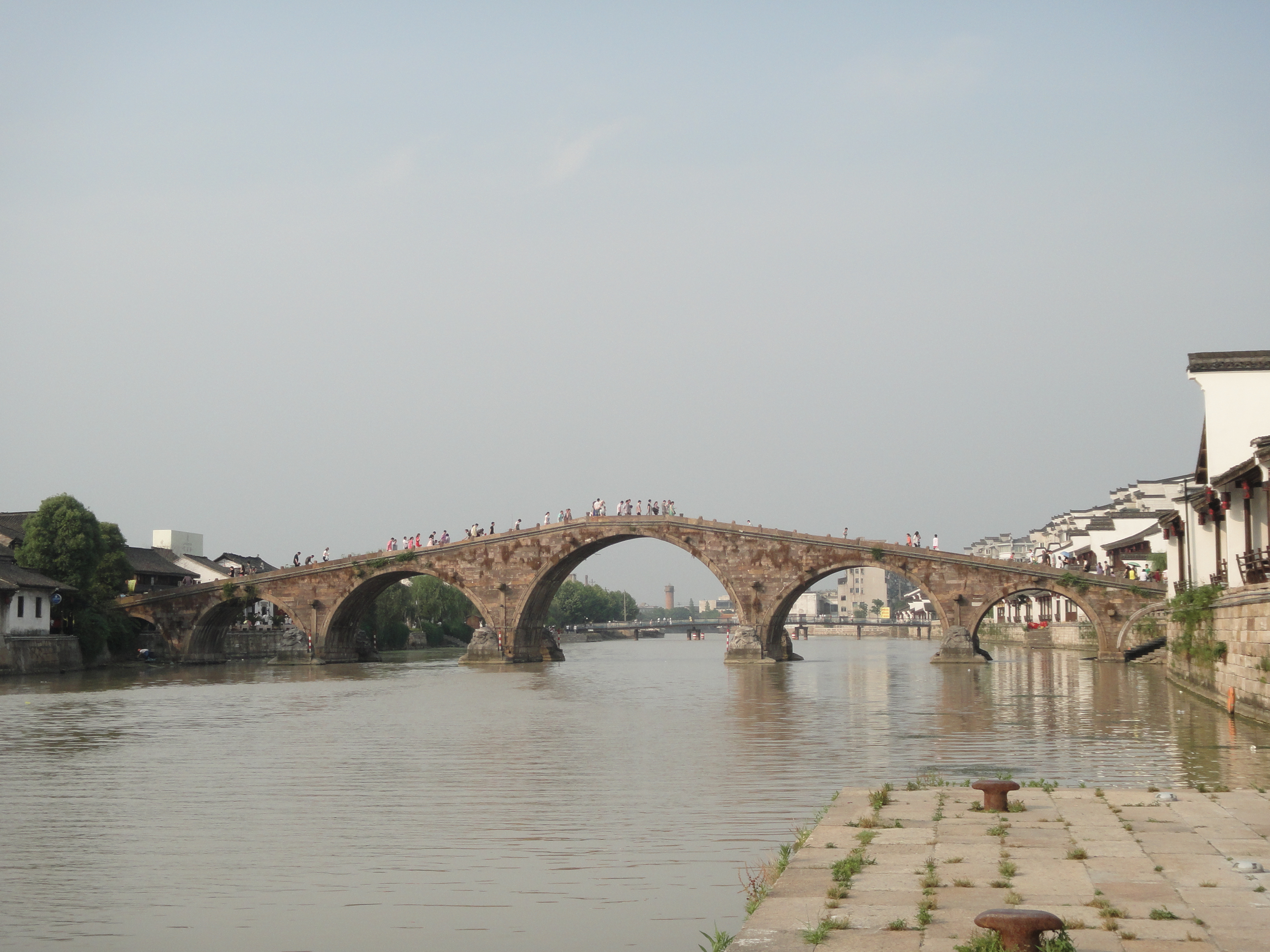
Guangji Bridge, built 1,100 years ago.

Guangji Bridge was built in 1494. At 78.7 meters long, 5.2 meters wide, and 13.86 meters high, it was the only 7-arch stone bridge on the Grand Canal. It is rumoured that the Guangji Bridge was built in the Tang dynasty and expanded in the Ming dynasty. There are 80 steps on each side of the bridge.

=== Qianlong Stele ===
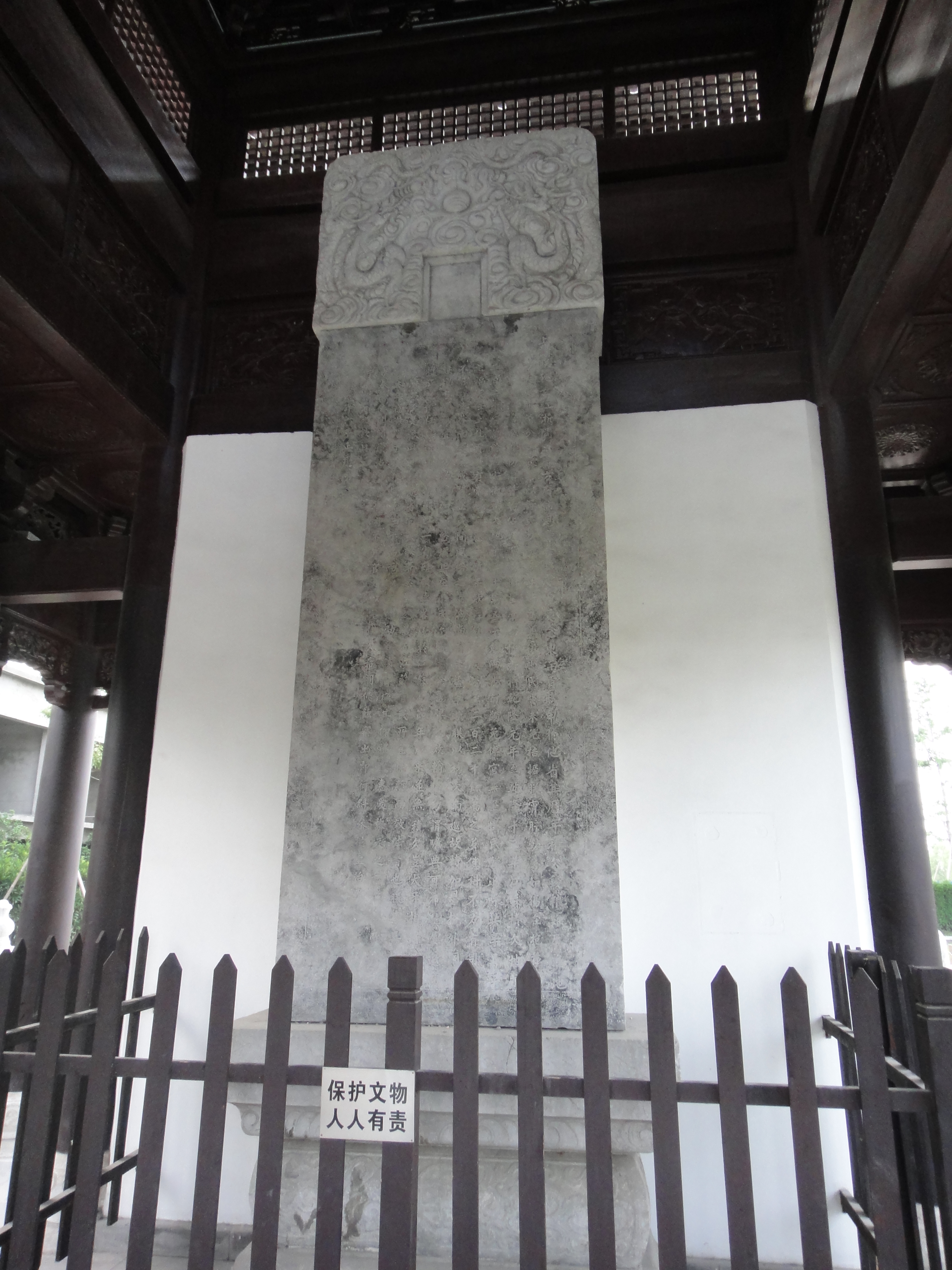
The Qianlong Stele, placed by the Qianlong Emperor in 1751.

The Qianlong Stele was originally located in the branch of Hangzhou Water Conservancy Office in the early Republican era. The office site was destroyed but the stele was reserved because it was embedded into the wall of house of Lu Jinjiang, who was the first executive officer of the Chongyu silk production factory.

The height of the Qianlong Stele is 5.45 meters. The header part is 1 meter high, 1.5 meters wide with the relief of "Two dragons playing a pearl" on it. The main body part is 3.35 meters high, 1.4 meters wide and 0.5 meters thick. The uncovering bottom part is 1.1 meters high 1.8 meters wide, and 0.8 meters thick. The stele was engraved with 429 Chinese characters as the main text and 10 Chinese characters as the signature of the Qianlong Emperor. The written characters served as the regular script. The stele is decorated by carvings of cloerds and dragons.

The main content of the stele describes the Qianlong Emperor rewarding Zhejiang for paying a grain tax during a period of natural disaster when he inspected southern China in 1751. The emperor specially permitted Zhejiang province to reduce the land tax and poll tax by 30 million taels of silver and built the stele to inform the people.

The Qianlong Stele was recognized as a cultural relic under Hangzhou in 2004. The stele and the site of the branch of Hangzhou Water Conservancy Office were then recognized as a cultural relic of Zhejiang province in 2011.

=== Plum Blossoms in Chaoshan Mountain ===
Chaoshan Mountain is one of the top three places to view plum blossoms in Jiangnan. The plum blossoms are said to have the distinguishing features of "old, wide and rare".

'Old' refers to the fact that Chaoshan Mountain has two of China's five types of ancient plum blossoms: the Tang and Song plum tree.

The Tang Plum Tree is located in front of the fragrance pavilion. It is said to be the incarnation of a fairy named Jiangmei and to be over a thousand years old.

The Song Plum Tree is located in front of the hall of Great Brightness. The body of the original plum tree withered to a large extent, but did continue to bloom for a number of years. However, it has since died.

'Wide' refers to how Chaoshan Mountain had a wide swath of plum blossoms which extended for miles. Nowadays, there are still thousands of plum-blossom trees, and a variety of breeds, including scarlet, pink, red, and green. Some sources allege that "Plum fragrance can be felt within 10 miles" and that "Chaoshan plum blossoms are second to none".

The Chaoshan plum-blossoms are regarded as 'rare' because they have six petals, rather than five.

== Cuisine ==
Cì máo ròuyuán (刺毛肉圆) is considered one of the most famous foods from Tangxi. It consists of meatballs and glutinous rice. It is said that this dish was invented by a local chief when the Qianlong Emperor once travelled down south from Beijing via the Grand Canal.

Xìshā yáng wěi (细沙羊尾) is a dessert consisting of fried dough with red bean paste inside. It is named after its shape, which looks similar to a sheep's tail (yáng wěi 羊尾).

== Tradition ==
It is believed that eating a Lìxià Dog (立夏狗) made of 80% glutinous rice and 20% rice vermicelli during Lixia could protect children from chronic summer fever.

== History and culture ==
=== Origin of geographical names ===
Tangqi town is named Tangqi because of the negative pond.

=== Intangible cultural heritage ===
Tangqi Town has sericulture silk weaving skills were included in the world intangible cultural heritage list, Qingshui silk wool making skills were included in the national intangible cultural heritage list, Tangqi cocoon circle, wooden boat making skills were included in the provincial intangible cultural heritage list.

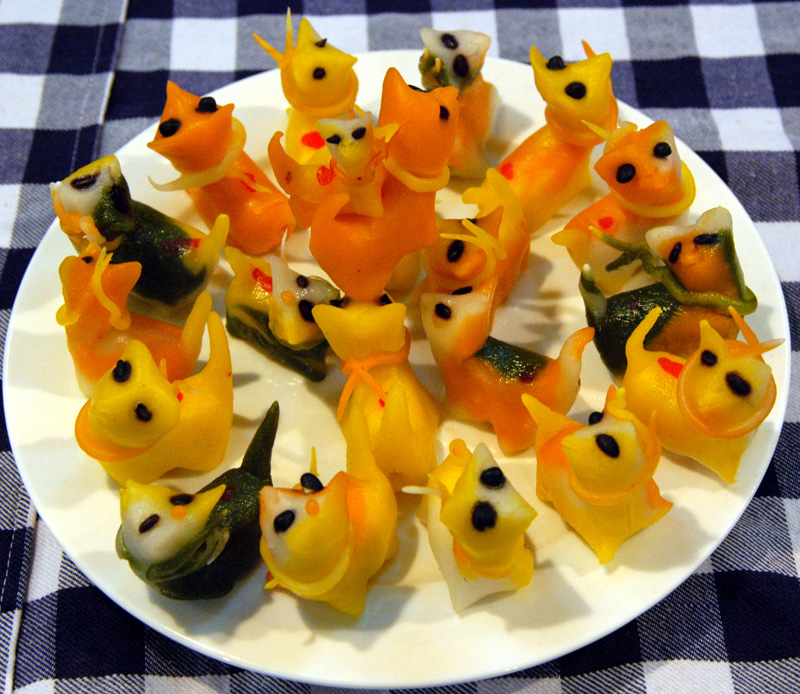
Lixia Dog

== Notable residents ==
- Wu Changshuo (1844–1927)
  - Wu was said to be very fond of the plum blossoms on Chaoshan Mountain.
- Feng Zikai

== Honorary title ==
In October 2018, Tangqi Town was selected as "2018 National Comprehensive Strength Thousand Strong Town".
