= Linping station =

Metro station in Hangzhou, China

Linping 临平
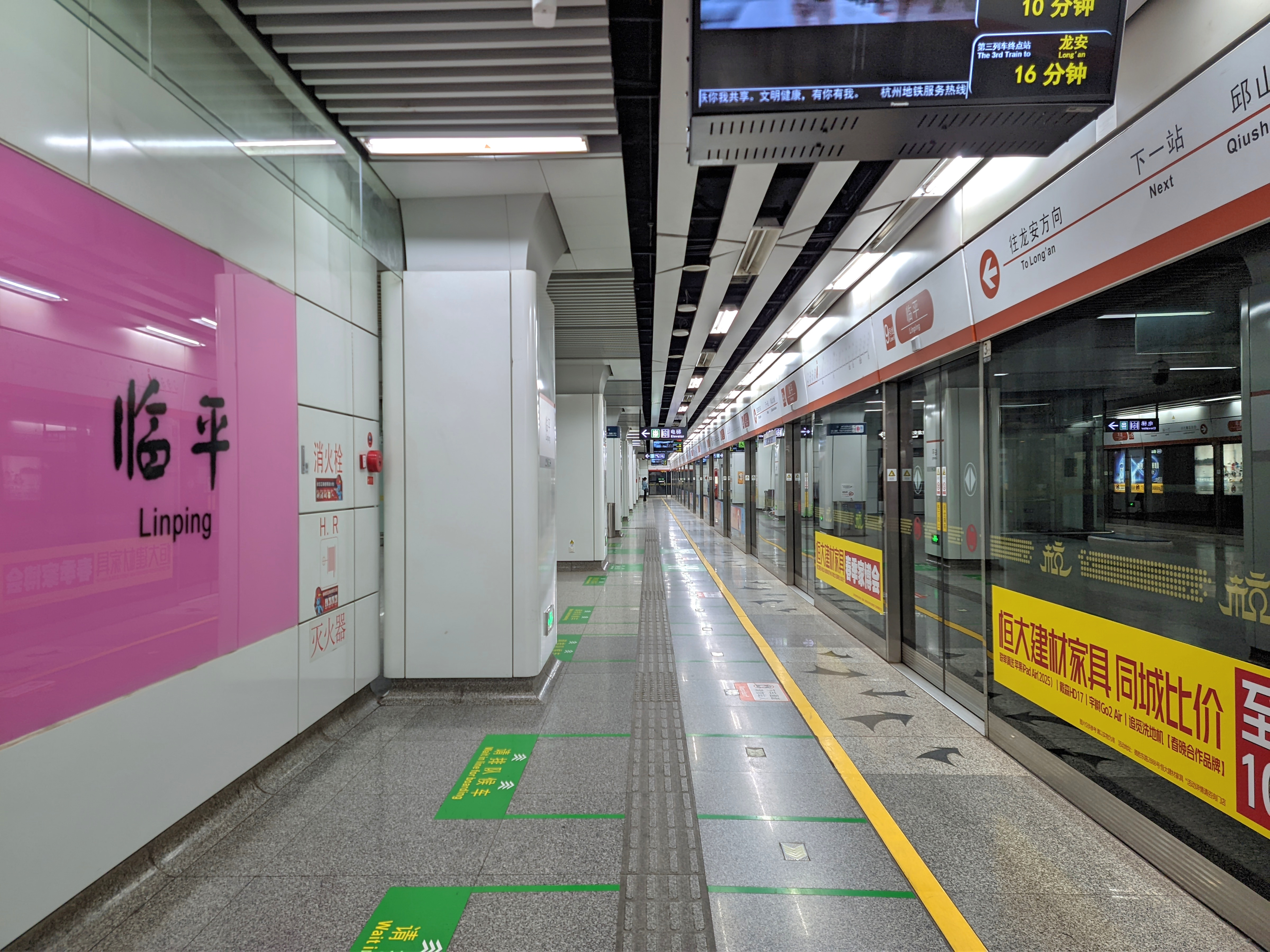
- Platform

Chinese name
- Simplified Chinese: 临平站
- Traditional Chinese: 臨平站
Transcriptions
Standard Mandarin
- Hanyu Pinyin: Línpíng Zhàn

General information
- Location: Yingbin Road (迎宾路) × Shiji Avenue (世纪大道); Linping District, Hangzhou, Zhejiang; China
- Coordinates: 30°24′30″N 120°17′58″E
- System: Hangzhou Metro
- Operator: Hangzhou Metro Corporation
- Lines: Line 3 (U/C); Line 9
- Platforms: 2 (1 island platform)
- Tracks: 2

Construction
- Structure type: Underground
- Accessible: Yes

History
- Opened: 24 November 2012

Services
Preceding station	Hangzhou Metro	Following station
Nanyuan towards Guanyintang	Line 9	Qiushan Avenue towards Long'an
Location

Linping (Chinese: 临平) is a station on Line 9 of the Hangzhou Metro in China. It was opened in November 2012. It is located in the Linping District of Hangzhou. It was opened on 24 November 2012 as a station of the branch of Line 1. On 10 July 2021, the branch line was separated from Line 1 and it became a station of Line 9.

== Station layout ==
Linping has two levels: a concourse, and an island platform with two tracks for line 9.

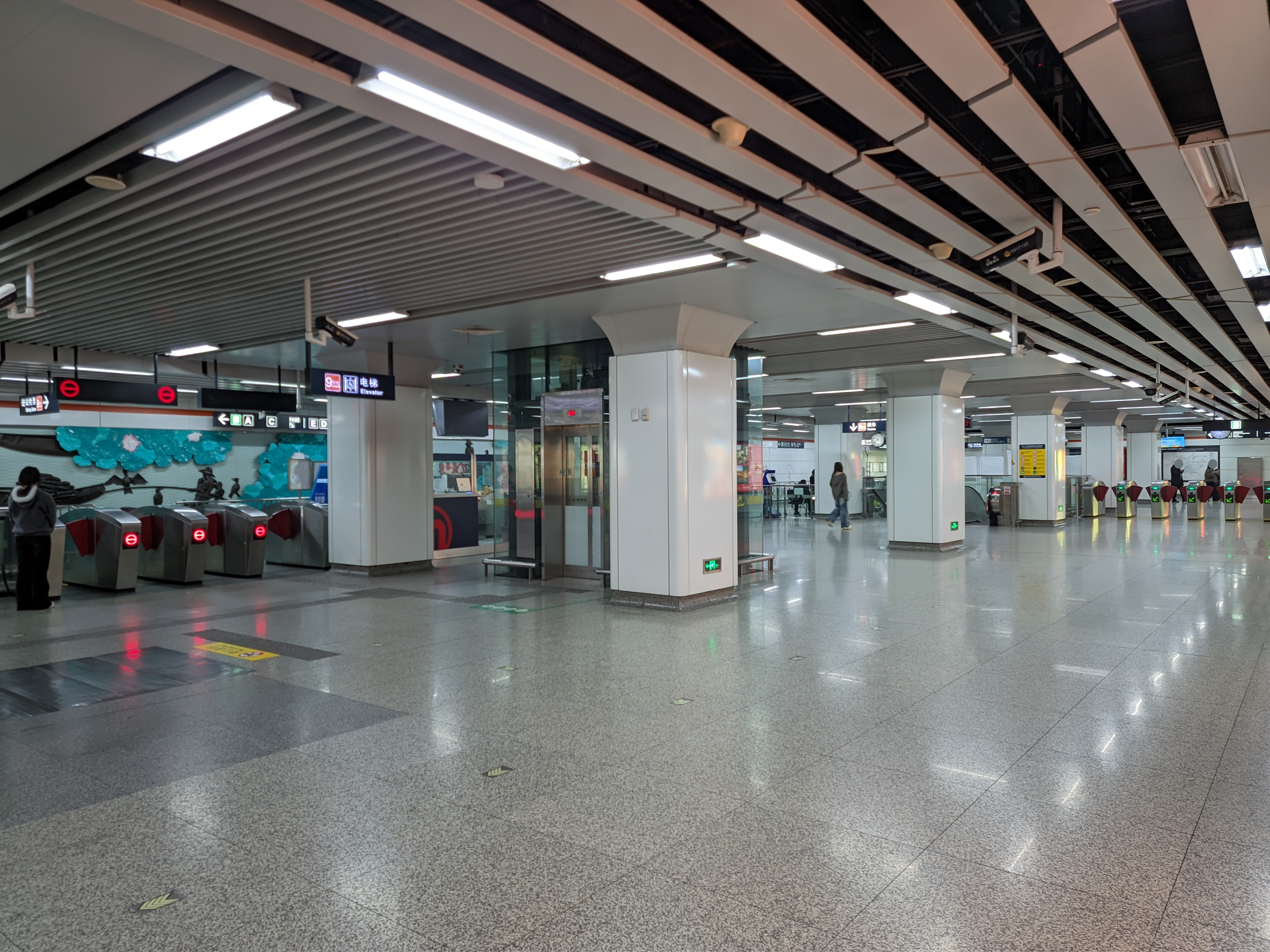
Concourse

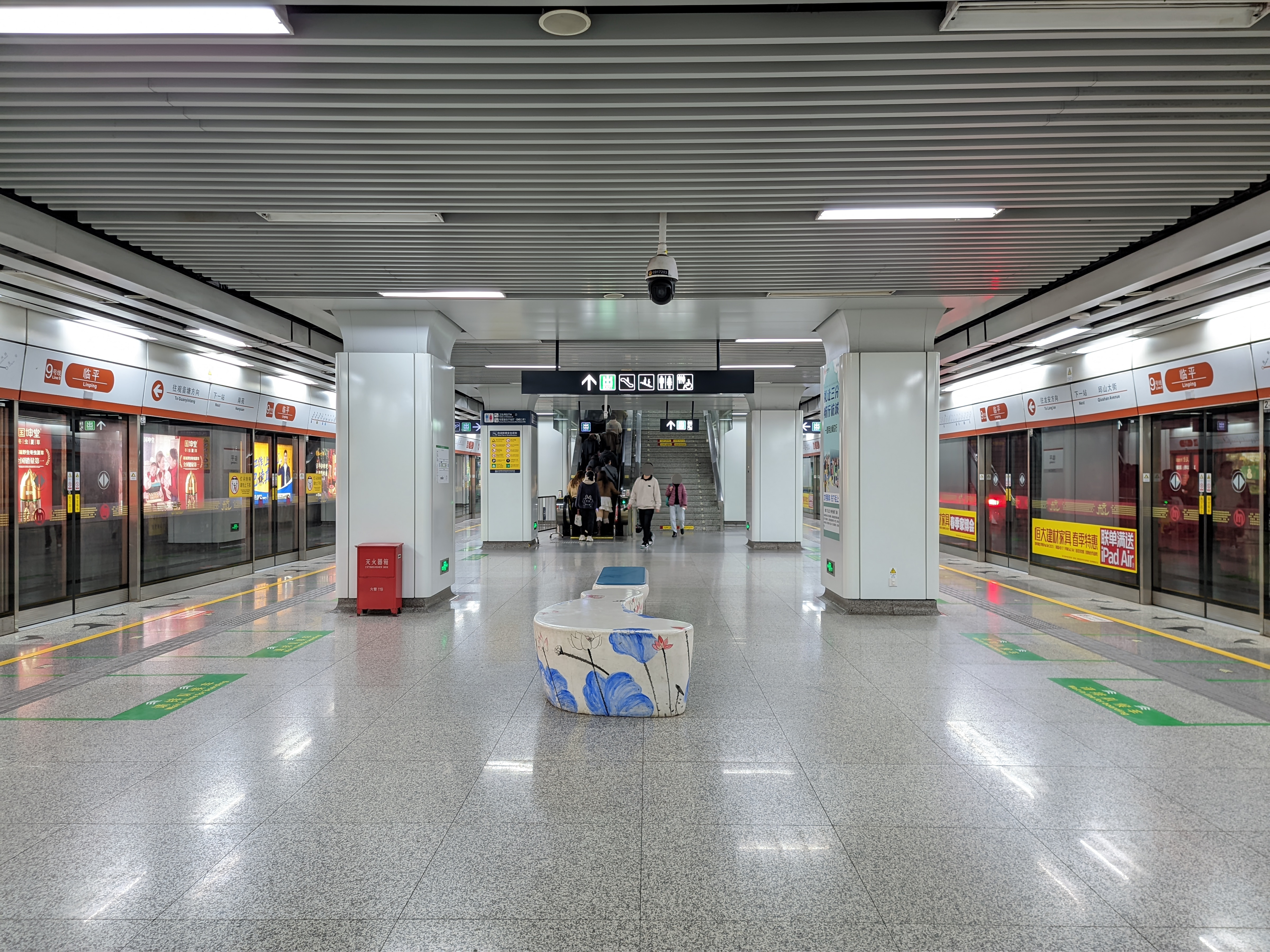
Platforms

== Entrances/exits ==
- A: Yingbin Road
- C: Linping Yin Tai City
- D: Yingbin Road
- E: Wanyue Street
