= Wintersweet =

Wintersweet or winter sweet is a common name for several plants and may refer to:

- Acokanthera oblongifolia, a plant of southern Africa
- Acokanthera oppositifolia, a shrub of central and southern Africa
- Chimonanthus praecox, a shrub of China
- Origanum dictamnus, a plant of Crete
- Origanum vulgare subsp. vulgare, a subspecies of oregano
