= Wu Changshuo =

Qing Dynasty painter (1844–1927)

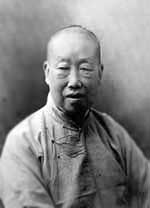
- Traditional Chinese: 吳昌碩
- Simplified Chinese: 吴昌硕
- Hanyu Pinyin: Wú Chāngshí

Wu Changshuo (Chinese: 吳昌碩; pinyin: Wú Chāngshuò, September 12, 1844 – November 29, 1927, also romanised as Wu Changshi, Chinese: 吳昌石; pinyin: Wú Chāngshí), born Wu Junqing (Chinese: 吳俊卿; pinyin: Wú Jùnqīng), was a Chinese calligrapher, painter, and seal artist of the late Qing Period. Born in Anji County, Zhejiang Province, he is best known for his achievements in painting, calligraphy, and seal carving. Wu Changshuo excelled at painting flowers—particularly plum blossoms, peonies, and pomegranates. His works are characterized by the use of bold, vivid colors and powerful brushstrokes, which together define his distinctive personal style.

== Life ==
Wu was born into a scholarly family in Huzhou, Zhejiang. In his youth, he experienced social upheaval, which shaped his early life. Later, he gradually immersed himself in the study of calligraphy, painting, and seal carving, developing his own artistic style through persistent practice.In his twenties, Wu moved to Jiangsu Province and settled down in Suzhou. Prior to the collapse of the Great Qing, he served as an imperial official in Liaoning.

Initially, he devoted himself to poetry and calligraphy with a strong interest in early scripts. He also led the Xiling Seal Art Society, an academic organisation for Hangzhou-based seal artists. Wu started painting in his thirties. Only later did he consider himself a painter associated with the "Shanghai School." As a painter, he was noted for helping to rejuvenate the art of painting flowers and birds. He considered carving seals and doing paintings to be integrated to each other.

His work garnered him fame and he was highly regarded in Japan.

After his death, he was interred under the Chaoshan.

Artistic Career

Wu Changshuo worked as a painter, calligrapher, and seal carver. He first developed his skills in calligraphy and seal carving before becoming more involved in painting. His study of ancient Chinese inscriptions influenced his work in all three areas. He was especially known for painting flowers and plants, often using bold colours and strong brushstrokes. He also combined traditional calligraphy techniques with painting, creating works that reflected his knowledge of ancient Chinese art. In 1913, he became the first president of the Xiling Seal Art Society, an important organisation for the study and practice of Chinese seal carving.

Artistic Style

Wu Changshuo's artistic style combined traditional Chinese techniques with his own approach to brushwork and composition. His study of ancient inscriptions and seal carving influenced the lines in his calligraphy and paintings. Rather than focusing on realistic details, he often used strong brushstrokes, bold colours, and simplified compositions to express the character of his subjects. His paintings of flowers and plants show how he used these techniques to create lively images. Another important feature of his work was the connection between painting, calligraphy, and seal carving. Instead of treating them as separate forms of art, he used skills from each area to develop a consistent personal style.

Influence and Legacy

Wu Changshuo became an important figure in modern Chinese art because he helped carry traditional artistic practices into the twentieth century. His work combined the study of ancient inscriptions with painting and calligraphy, showing how older techniques could be used in new ways. He was associated with the Shanghai School and influenced artists who came after him. His work also attracted attention in Japan, where his paintings, calligraphy, and seal carving gained admirers. Today, his works are held in museum collections and continue to be studied as examples of the relationship between traditional Chinese art and modern artistic development.

== Gallery of Wu Changshi's artworks ==
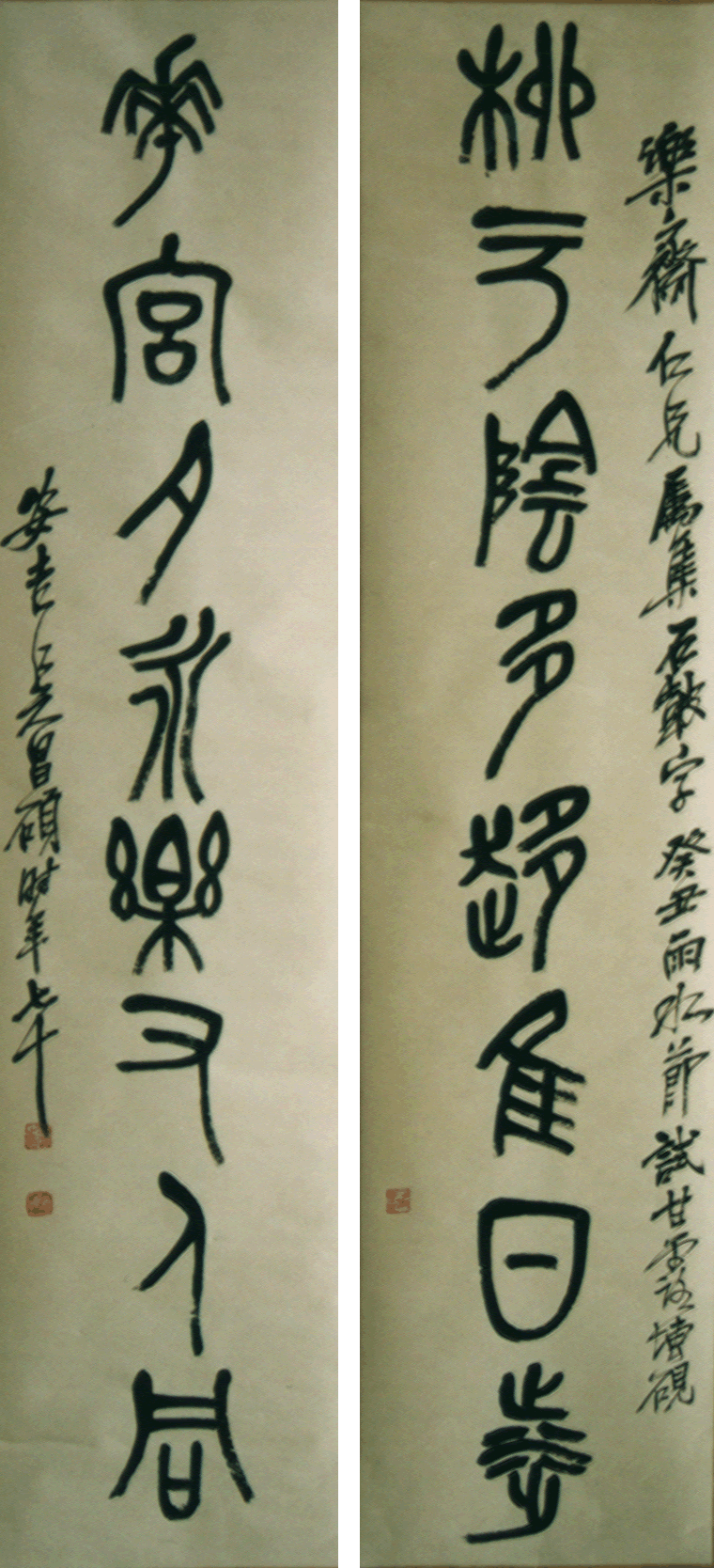
Couplet

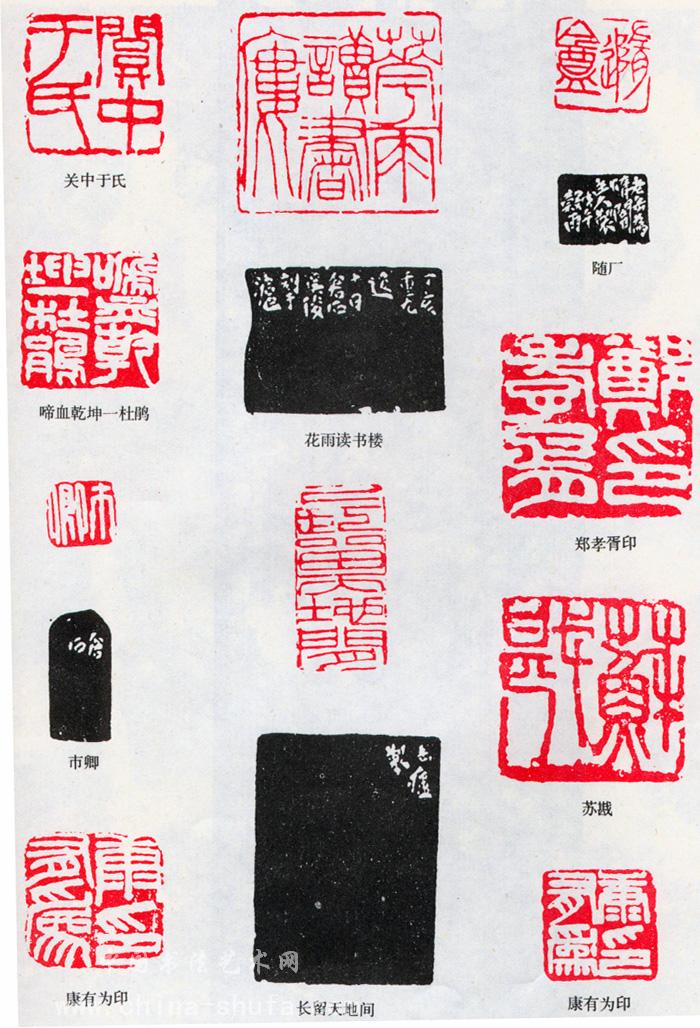
Seal Carving

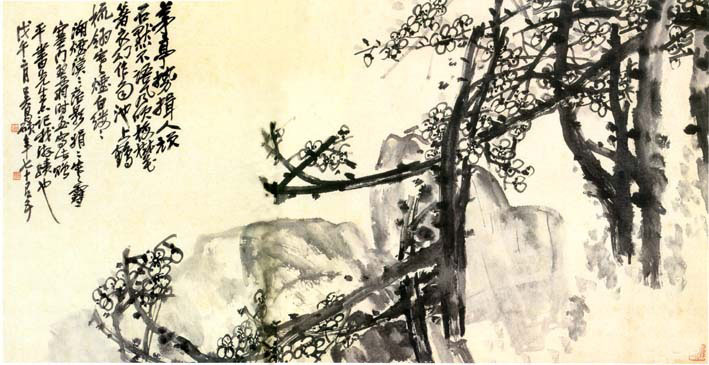
Ink and Water Plum Blossom

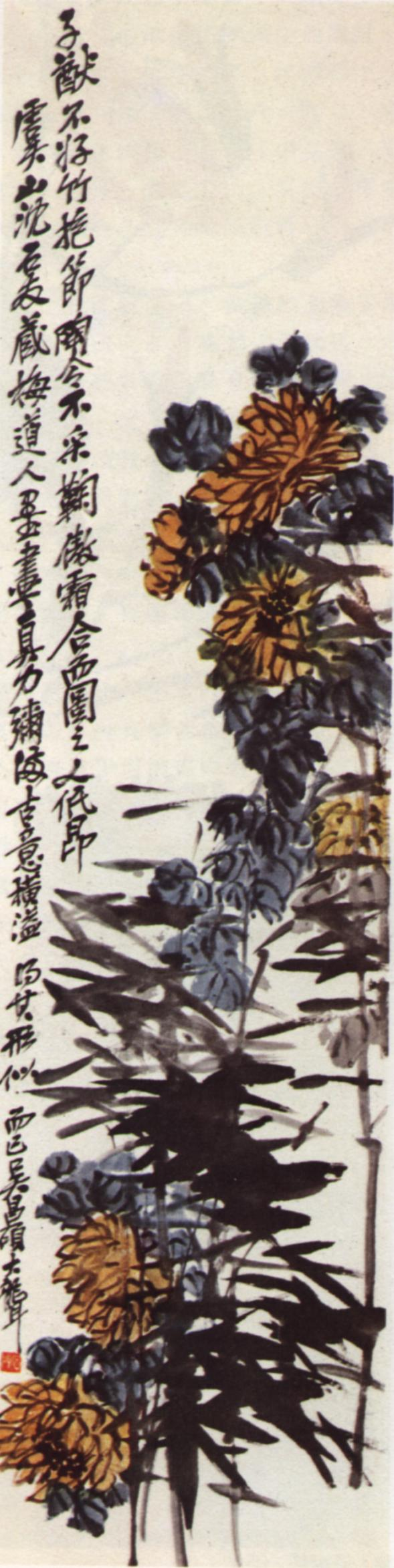
Chrysanthemum Flowers and Bamboo

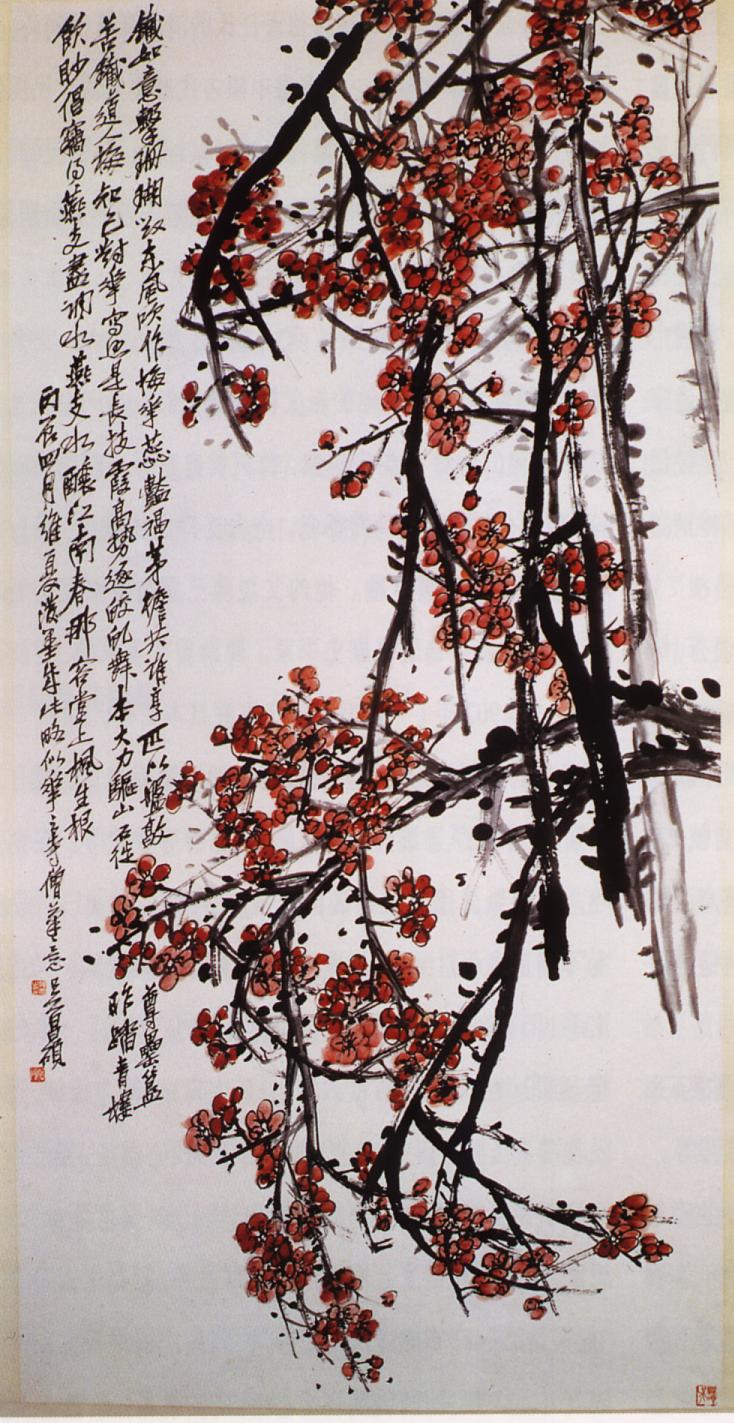
Plum Blossom

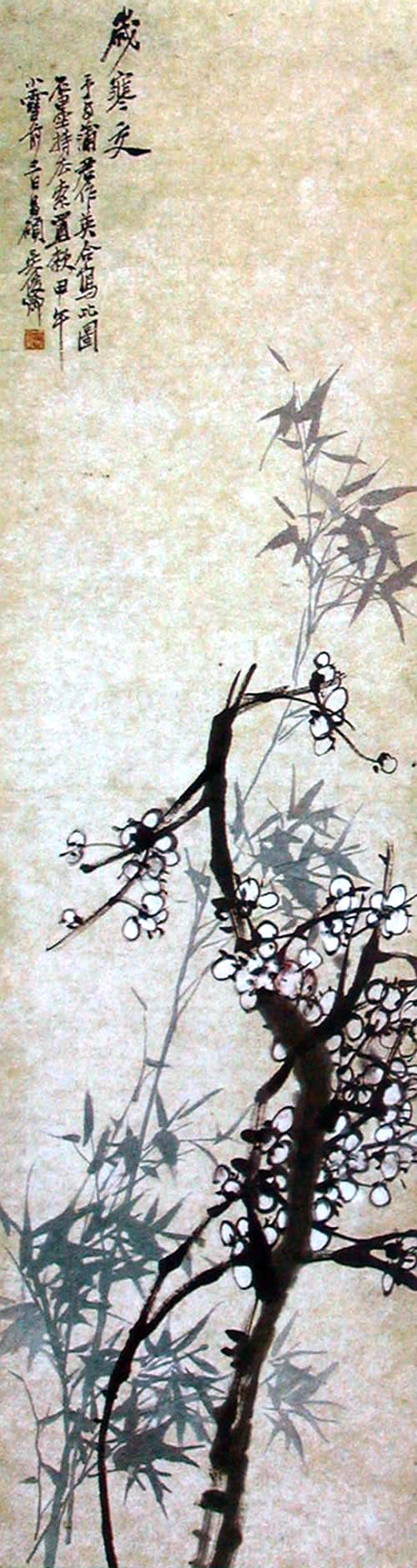
Two Durable Plants in Winter: Plum Flowers and Bamboo

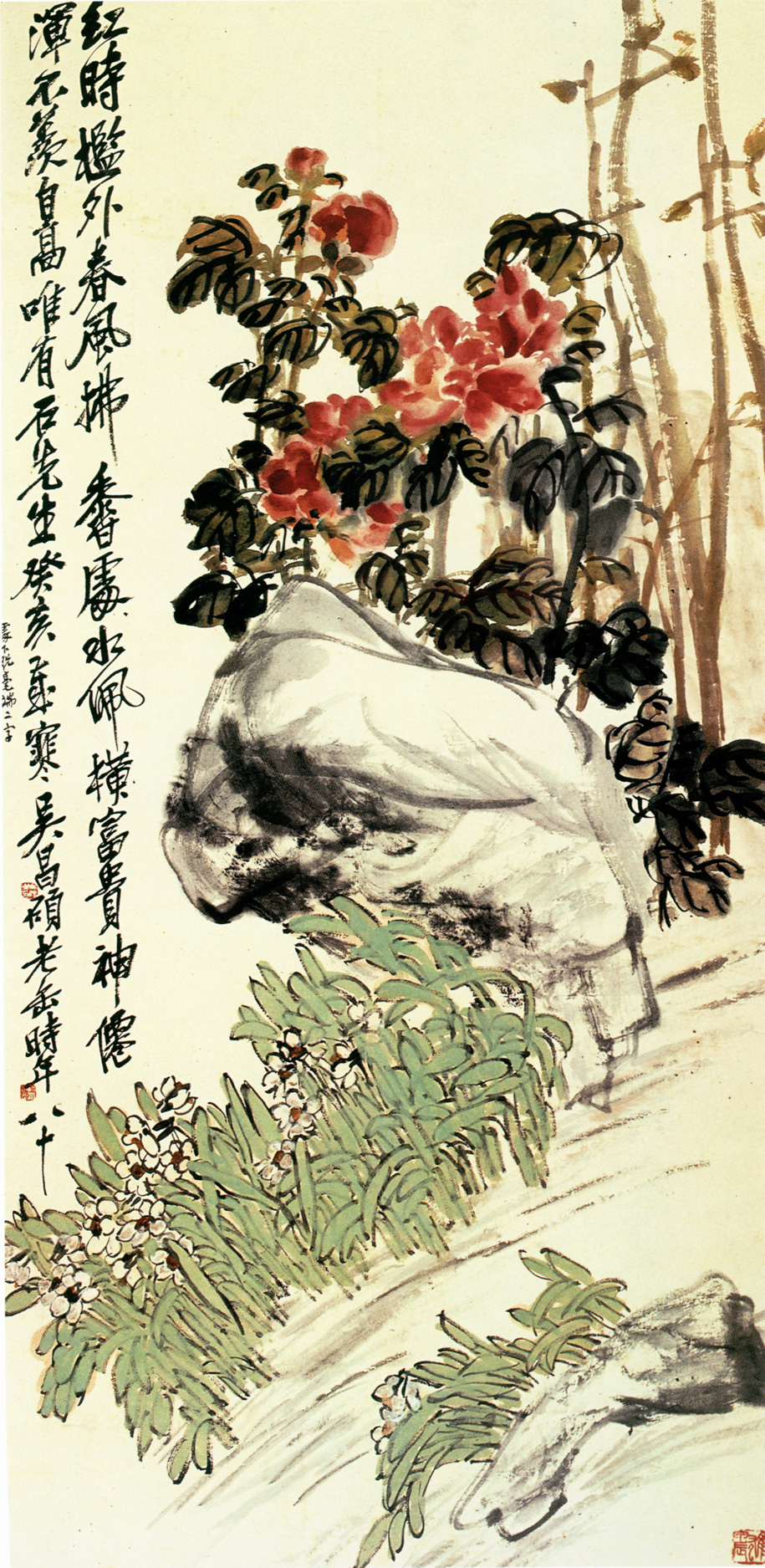
Peonies and Daffodils

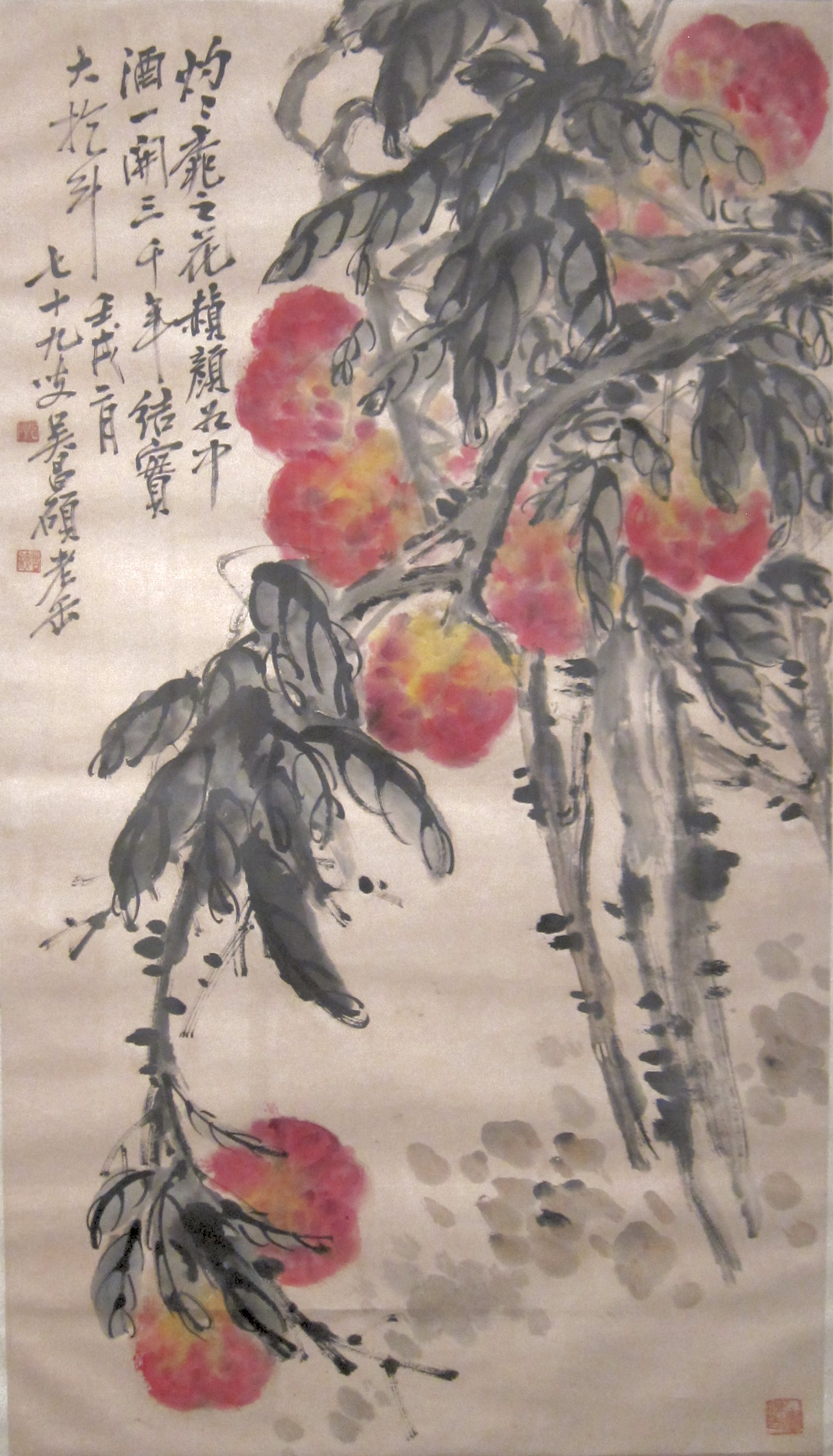
Peaches

== Sources ==
- Chinese Paintings in the Ashmolean Museum Oxford(162) Oxford ISBN 1-85444-132-9
- Chinese culture site
- Examples of his work at the Museum of Fine Arts Boston
