= Linping, Hangzhou =

Linping 临平区
- District
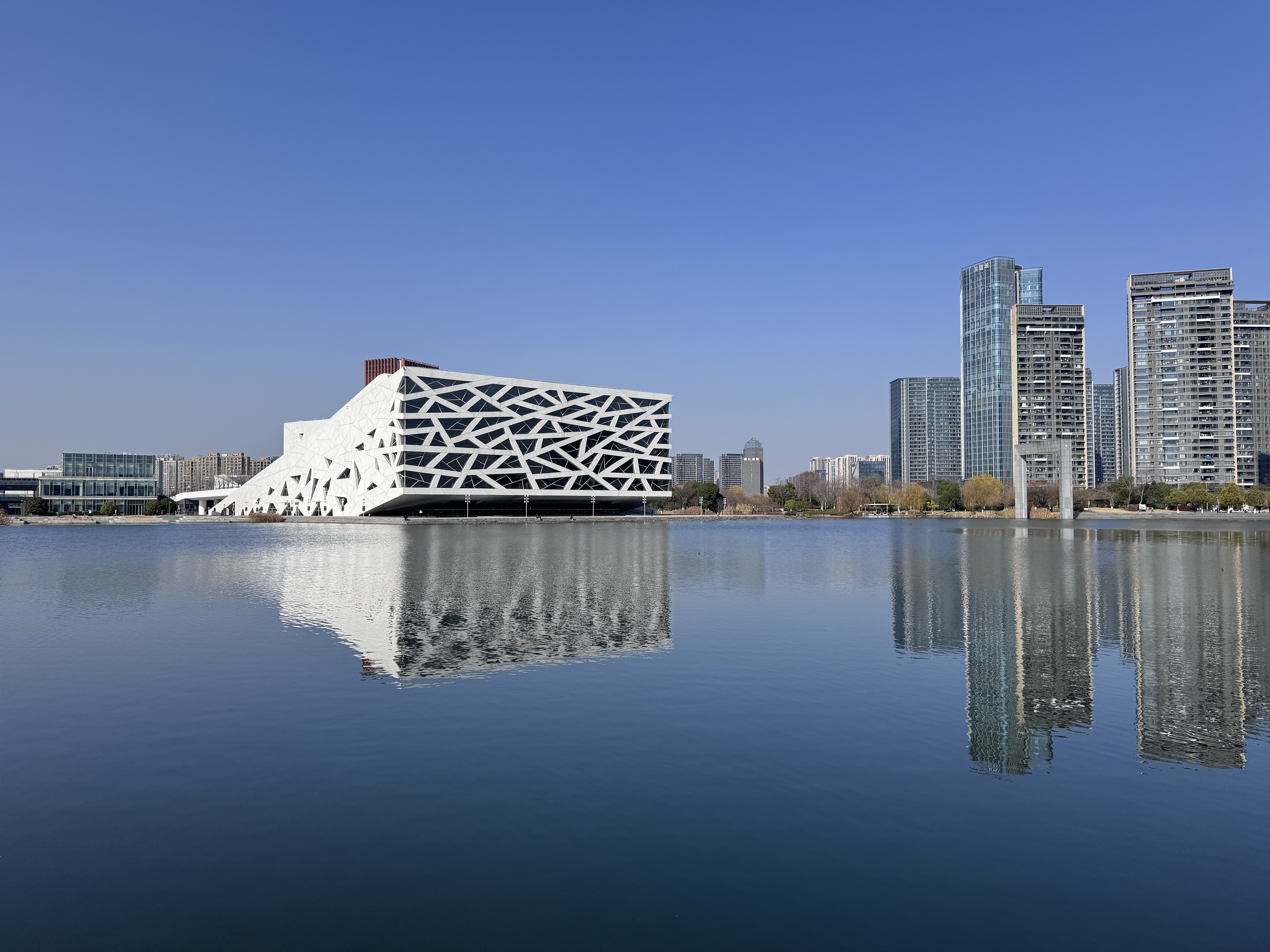
- Linping Grand Theater

- Administrative map of Linping District

- Location in Zhejiang
- Country: People's Republic of China
- Province: Zhejiang
- Sub-provincial city: Hangzhou

Area
  - Total: 286 km^{2} (110 sq mi)

Population (2024)
  - Total: 1,142,000
  - Density: 3,990/km^{2} (10,300/sq mi)
- Time zone: UTC+8 (China Standard)
- Postal code: 311100
- Area code: 0571
- Website: www.linping.gov.cn/col/col1229554621/index.html

Linping, Hangzhou
- Simplified Chinese: 临平区
- Traditional Chinese: 臨平區
Transcriptions
Standard Mandarin
- Hanyu Pinyin: Línpíng Qū
Wu
- Romanization: lin bin chi

Linping is a suburban district of Hangzhou, Zhejiang, China. It officially become a district on April 9, 2021.

Linping District has a total area of 280 Square kilometers as of April 2021. Linping has a very facilitative transportation system and has a significant local position, since it is the eastern gate of Hangzhou and the main military position. There are 23 towns or cities connecting with Linping using buses every day. The river in Linping named Shangtang river is through the western of Hangzhou, eastern of Haining and convergent into Qiantang River, Hefeng harbor and the Grand Canal.

== Administration ==
Linping District is divided into: Linping Subdistrict (临平街道), Donghu Subdistrict (东湖街道), Nanyuan Subdistrict (南苑街道), Xingqiao Subdistrict (星桥街道), Yunhe Subdistrict (运河街道), Qiaosi Subdistrict (乔司街道), Chongxian Subdistrict (崇贤街道), and Tangxi Town (塘栖镇).

== Economy ==
In 1985, Linping had 125 factories about silk, knit, clothing, food, bread making, machine, mechanical engineering, medicine, architecture and electron. The promoting rate of Linping was boosting with high speed and at the end of 1985, Linping had 36 industries, 2,105 workers, 1017 million RMB annual value of production, 360 stores and 298 individual household.

Now, Linping has No.3 financial income in Zhejiang Province. In 2009, GDP in Linping was reaching 532.46 hundred million and had 100.07 hundred million total financial income. After these years development, Linping attracted a number of the country's 500 strong industry to build industry.

As the urban renewal area, the structure of the tertiary industry becomes more and more completely, the consumption market is become more prosperous, the professional market boosts with a hasty rhythm and the traveling economy is strong in new. The Yuhang economic and technological development zone located at the northern direction of Linping and became the National economic and technological development zone in Sept. 29, 2012.

== Fundamental facilitate ==
Linping has the cultural and athletic facilities of Cultural Central, Library, Cinema, Opera Central, TV Station, Radio Station, Youth Centre, Elderly cadres activity room, Swimming Center and athletic Field.

Linping has two state-run middle schools—No.3 Middle School, No.1 Middle School; Two privately run middle schools—Shulan Middle School, Xingda Middle School; Five state-run primary schools—Shiyan Primary School, Xinda Primary School, Shulan Primary School, No.1 Primary School, No.2 Primary School.

Linping has organized medical and healthy services, including Yuhang No.1 Hospital, Yuhang No.5 Hospital, Yuhang Manternal and child health care Hospital, Yuhang Local health defensive Station and Center for disease control.

In recent years, the main urban area of Linping is progressing with the high speed, and there are several super-market entered into Linping, such as Walmart and In-time.

== Linping New Town ==
Linping New Town is in the southern part of Linping, including Linping station on Hangzhou Metro, Central commercial areas and Big Dongan Community. In order to build up Linping as a modern new town, the founders used “compact city, easeful city, literate city, intelligent city and leisure city” as the elementary idea.

Linping station of Hangzhou Metro shortens the time from Linping to other areas in Hangzhou, thus conducing many people getting entertainments, taking leisure time, and setting home in Linping. In addition, the central commercial areas will become the financial trade market, businesses office, meeting exhibition and super shopping place. The third one is the Big Donggan Community that regards the People's Square as the center and this center will be decorated by centuries-old culture and fascinating views. This Central Square lets people live in Linping with convenience.

The core idea leads Linping towards prosperity is enhancing the connection between other cities. Therefore, promoting High-speed rail, subway and highway offer people who live in Linping a facilitating means to let people visit some nearby cities, and also attract people who live in other cities settle down in Linping.

Yuhang economic development zone is in the center of the Linping New Town, Qianjiang economic development zone is in the southeast of the Linping New Town and there will have two more industrial estates locate in Linping. A number of buildings nearby the high-speed railway and subways are being set up in Linping. People only need to take eight minutes to the center of Hangzhou and only thirty minutes to Shanghai if they live in Linping.

== Traveling ==
- Linping Mountain is in the north part of Linping and became famous since the Tang dynasty. Linping Mountain has some recreational facilities, some fitness equipments, a zoo and some parks. A tower is on the top of the Linping Mountain and this tower is one of the sign of Linping.
- Chao Mountain, between Linping and Tangxi, is famous for wintersweet. Chao Mountain plum is ancient, peculiar and wild. Standing in Yunhai Tower which is on the top of the Chao Mountain, visitors can see the whole mountain is decorated by various kinds of wintersweet with different colors. Chao Mountain has a temple named Gushabaoci Temple which is used to honor a famous artist -- Wu Changshuo. Chao Mountain has an amount of rare stones and Yandong is the most well-known one.
- New field Cultural Creativity Park is changing from an old silk factoryay and become a sign of the Hangzhou Cultural Creativity Park. It combines two themes which are entertainments and industrial agglomeration. The first road in the park named Linping water street which mainly illustrates the cultural characters of Yangtze river) and the local tradition of Linping. The second road in the park is the central commercial street. There are many restaurants, small grocery stores, galleries, clothing stores and coffee shops on the two sides of the streets
- Shangtang River, a branch and the old mainstream of the Grand Canal in Hangzhou. It starts from Linping and goes across Tianducheng Resort, and today is an important section of the Grand Canal, a new world cultural heritage site in 2014. It connects Tianducheng Resort, which is famous as a large residential community characterized of the replica of Paris symbolic buildings, and the Dingqiao Town, a part of Jianggan district.

== Transport ==
=== Metro ===
- Line 3 (Hangzhou Metro): Huangheshan station, Xingqiao station
- Line 9 (Hangzhou Metro): 10 stations

=== High-speed rail ===
- Linping South railway station
